= County of Pallars Jussà =

Coordinates: 42.2481°N 0.9617°E

Coat of arms of the Counts of Pallars.

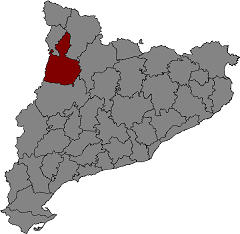
Location of the County of Pallars Jussà within Catalonia.

The County of Pallars Jussà (Note: Pallás Jusá is the rarely used Castilian form.) or Lower Pallars was a county in the Hispanic March during the eleventh and twelfth centuries, long after the march had ceased to be effectively administered by the Kings of France. It was a division of the County of Pallars, which had been de facto, and possible de jure, independent since the late ninth century. It roughly corresponded with the modern Catalan comarca of Pallars Jussà.

== Division of Pallars ==
In 1011, Sunyer of Pallars died and by his testament his county was divided between his sons, the eldest, Raymond III, receiving Pallars Jussà and the younger, William II, receiving Pallars Sobirà. Pallars Jussà comprised the valley of Flamicell, the left bank of the Noguera Ribagorzana, and Pobla de Segur. It had a frontier with the Moorish Conca de Tremp and Montsec and its capital was at Segur.

By the year 1000, the economic and social centre of Pallars was located in the Pobla de Segur and Tremp, in Pallars Jussà. It was wealthier than Pallars Sobirà and capable of expansion in the Reconquista against the Muslim territory to its south. Raymond III, however, ignored the opportunities of war with the Moor, rather leaving the such venues open to Arnau Mir de Tost, a baron from the County of Urgell. Raymond IV, son and successor of Raymond III, was also prevented from concentrating on the border by the attacks of his neighbours, his cousin Artau I of Pallars Sobirà, Ermengol III of Urgell, and the noble family of the Vallferrera.

== War with Pallars Sobirà ==
In Pallars Jussà during the eleventh century the comital power was violently reduced by the incessant attacks of the rebellious nobility, supported as they were by Artau of Pallars Sobirà and Ermengold of Urgell, who intended to extend his own border to the Muslim kingdom of Lleida. Because Pallars Jussà was so much richer and populous than the poor and mountainous Pallars Sobirà, the nobles of the latter country designed to eliminate the authority of Raymond IV in the former country. Artau himself was barely a count, more so the war leader of a band of powerful feudatories whose objective was the pillage of the wealthier rural communities of the lower territories of Pallars Jussà and the repeal of their rights of tax exemption and other immunities. The peasants of Pallars Jussà were heavily burdened by arbitrary exactions, forced labour, and military service. The barons had the right to exact toltae, forciae, and usatici, that is, "customary levies."

In the ensuing war, Raymond IV lost most of his fortresses, including his capital, Segur.

With reduction of their count, the nobles of Pallars Jussà took the opportunity to renounce their obligations to him and to secure their position in the castles as private properties. Many of them allied with Artau. It was only with the aid of the Moors, received sometime before Artau's death in 1081, that Raymond IV was able to regain his position and establish a peace in his Pallars Jussà. The peace lasted a long time, for the son of Artau I, Artau II (1081–1124), is recorded as never having fought with his relatives of Pallars Jussà.

== Catalan leadership ==
In 1055, Raymond IV completed a marriage alliance with Arnau Mir by wedding his daughter Valença. Their successors reigned down until 1124 when the last of them, Bernard Raymond, who had fought with Raymond Berengar III of Barcelona against Lleida, died in the Battle of Corbins. Bernard was succeeded by his nephew Arnau Mir, who moved in the orbit of Alfonso the Battler and participated in the negotiations which followed the retirement of Ramiro II of Aragon in 1137. He was a faithful follower of Raymond Berengar IV of Barcelona and Alfonso II of Aragon, who granted him the city of Fraga.

Around 1161, Arnau founded the new city of Vilanova de Pallars (Palau Noguera), which he granted a charter of tax exemption in 1168. Arnau by his will left Pallars Jussà to the suzerainty of the Knights Hospitaller, but his son Raymond V repudiated this. When Raymond's heiress, Valença, died heirless, she was succeeded by Dolça de Só, the daughter of Bernard Raymond. On 27 May 1192, she donated the county to Alfonso and the Crown of Aragon (specifically the Kingdom of Aragon) with the recognition "of many knights and other good men of the land." Pallars Jussà was the last major county to be annexed to the Crown. Urgell remained independent and Pallars Sobirà and Empúries were minor counties in comparison.

In the late eleventh century, a troop of mercenaries called paillers probably hailed from Pallars, though the contemporary chronicler Geoffrey of Vigeois derives the name from palearii (strawmen). The paillers were active in the early wars involving Raymond V of Toulouse and the Albigensians.

== List of counts ==
- Raymond III (Note: The numbering of the counts named Raymond varies between sources. The numbering used here is based on Santiago Sobrequés Vidal, Els barons de Catalunya (Barcelona, 1957), while Armand de Fluvià numbers them Raymond IV, Raymond V and Raymond VI, respectively. See Bisson (1987), p. 75 n3.) (1011–1047)
- Raymond IV (1047–1098)
- Arnold Raymond (1098–1112)
- Peter Raymond (1098–1112)
- Bernard Raymond (1112–1124)
- Arnold Mir (1124–1174)
- Raymond V (1174–1177)
- Valença (1177–1182)
- Dulce de So (1182–1192)

== Sources ==
- Bisson, Thomas N. "The Problem of Feudal Monarchy: Aragon, Catalonia, and France." Speculum, 53:3 (Jul., 1978), pp 460–478.
- Bisson, Thomas N. "Celebration and Persuasion: Reflections on the Cultural Evolution of Medieval Consultation." Legislative Studies Quarterly, 7:2 (May, 1982), pp 181–204.
- Bisson, Thomas N. "The Feudal Domain of Pallars Jussà (c. 1175): A Record of Obligations and Custom." Medievalia, 7 (Oct., 1987), pp 73–84.
- Bisson, Thomas N. "Unheroed Pasts: History and Commemoration in South Frankland before the Albigensian Crusades." Speculum, 65:2 (Apr., 1990), pp 281–308.
- Freedman, Paul. "Military Orders and Peasant Servitude in Catalonia: Twelfth and Thirteenth Centuries." The Hispanic American Historical Review, 65:1 (Feb., 1985), pp 91–110.
- Cheyette, Fredric L. Ermengard of Narbonne and the World of the Troubadours. Ithaca: Cornell University Press, 2001.
