= Oria de Pallars =

Medieval Spanish noblewoman

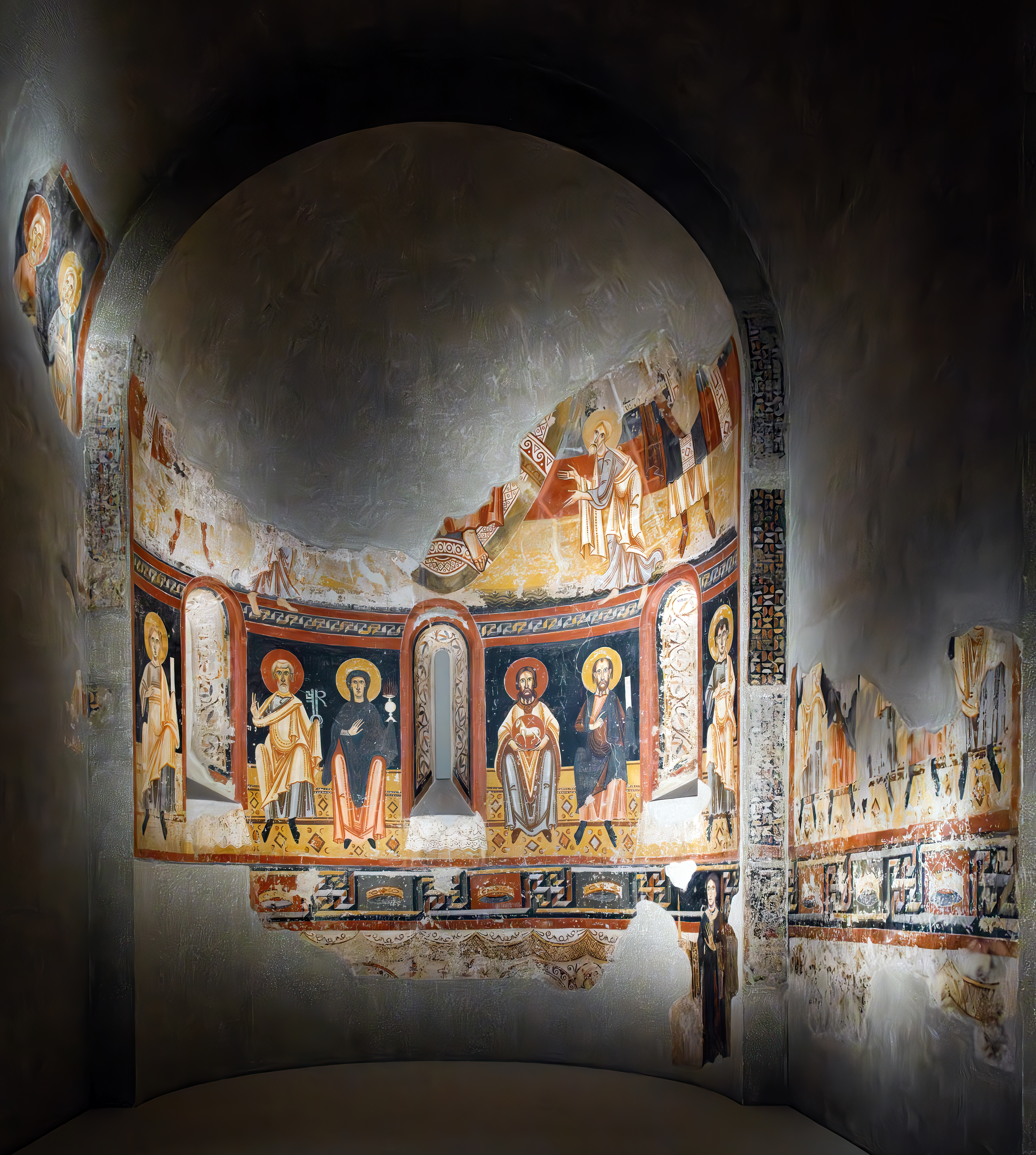
Apse fresco of Sant Pere del Burgal, countess of Pallars lower right register

Oria de Pallars (c.1120 – 1178) (or "Aurea") was a medieval Spanish noblewoman, countess of Pallars Jussà and wife of Arnau Mir del Pallars Jussà (count from 1124–74). Oria was the daughter of Bernat de Entenza and his wife Garsenda. She founded the Cistercian monastery of Santa Maria de la Gloria, in Casbas de Huesca in 1173, with Arnau's support.

Her son, Ramon V (r. 1174–1177), succeeded his father. The succession did cause some conflict within the marriage as Arnau's first will left the county to the Hospitaller Order. In the end, the succession was confirmed instead. Ramon died young, leaving his daughter Valencia under Oria's tutelage. In 1178, Oria entered the monastery of Casbas with her infant granddaughter, Valencia. Oria's final testament survives and reflects her pious endeavors and independence as a widow. The surviving documents of the Monastery of Casbas present the countess as an active donor. She did not restrict her patronage to the monastery she founded, however, extending her wealth to various churches and communities in the county. This dedication has led Ruiz-Domènec and others to identify Oria as the donor figure in the apse fresco of Sant Pere del Burgal.

== Bibliography ==
- Ascaso Sarvisé, Lourdes (1986). El Monasterio Cisterciense de Santa María de Casbas (1173-1350) (PDF) (in Spanish). Zaragoza: Instituto de Estudios Altoaragoneses. ISBN 8439867735.
- Rosell, F. Miquel (1946). Liber Feudorum Maior: cartulario real que se conserva en el Archivo de la Corona de Aragon (in Spanish). Barcelona: Publ. de la Sección de Estudios Medievales. OCLC 162803486.
- Ruiz-Domènec, J.E. (1995). "Oria, Condesa de Pallars: una dama catalana del siglo XII". Medievalia. Revista d'Estudis Medievals (in Spanish). 12: 7–12. Archived from the original on 2017-03-12.
- Ubieto Arteta, Agustín (1966). Documentos de Casbas (in Spanish). Valencia. ISBN 9788470130045. Archived from the original on 2017-03-12.
- Valls Taberner, Ferran (1915–1916). "Els orígens dels comtats de Pallars i Ribagorça". Estudis Universitaris Catalans (in Catalan). IX: 1–101.
