= Pep Coll =

Spanish writer (Josep Coll i Martí, born 1949

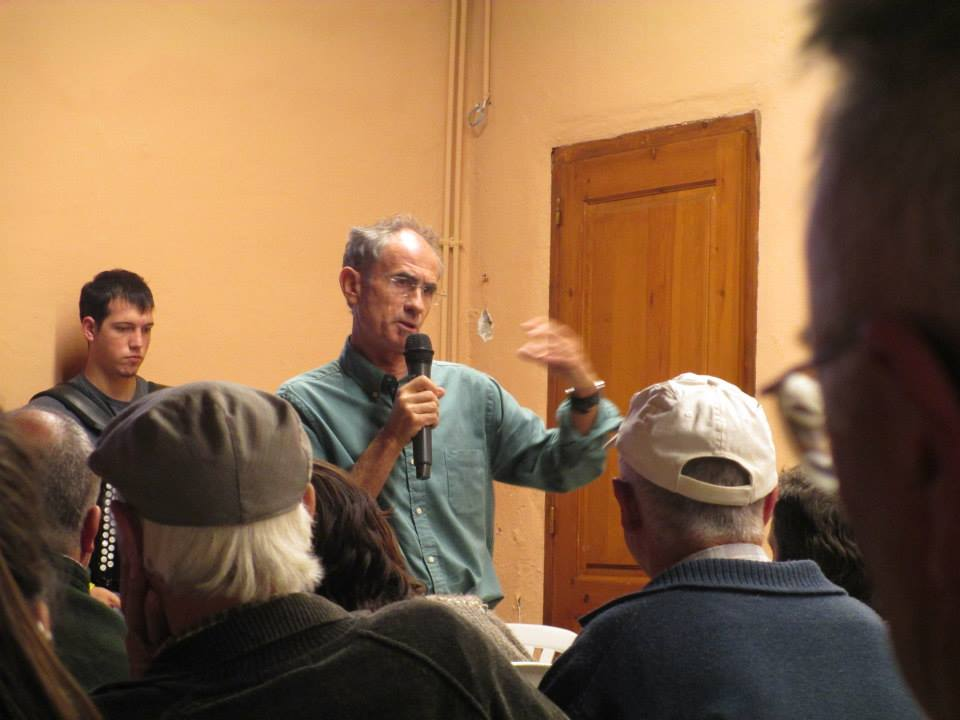
Pep Coll

Josep Coll i Martí (born October 16, 1949 in Pessonada, Conca de Dalt, Pallars Jussà (Catalonia)), better known as Pep Coll, is a Spanish writer. A prolific author, he has cultivated all literary genres, including journalism (having contributed articles to the newspapers Segre and El Periódico and the magazine Descobrir Catalunya). His life and literary world are the Pyrenees, which have become a legendary universe. His works have been translated into several languages, including Spanish and Basque. In addition to his work as a writer, he has been teacher of language and literature.

== Life ==
=== Early life ===
Josep Coll i Martí came from a humble family with scarce resources. He studied humanities at the Seminary of La Seu d'Urgell and continued his studies at the University of Barcelona, where he graduated in arts and humanities.

=== Professional experience ===
His beginnings as a teacher go back to La Pobla de Segur (Pallars Jussà), where he was for five years and where he became interested in the Catalan language. After passing his exams, he decided to forge a new path in the city of Lleida because his previous lived experience as a student in Barcelona was not very comforting. There he worked as a teacher of Catalan Language and Literature at the secondary school IES Màrius Torres from 1980 to 2010.

=== Experience as a writer ===
During those years, he combined teaching with writing professionally, publishing books and also contributing to various periodicals. He is president of the Centre d'Estudis del Pallars, studying the Pallars dialect of Catalan as well as traditional narratives from Pyrenees that he recreates and synthesizes in accordance with the different genres he employs. He has also been awarded several prizes, notably the Catalan Critics Award for his novel Dos taüts negres i dos de blancs (Two black coffins and two white ones).

== Works ==
=== Novels ===
- 1989 La mula vella, Empúries.
- 1995 El Pont de Mahoma, Empúries.
- 1997 El segle de la llum, Empúries.
- 1999 L'abominable crim de l'Alsina Graells, Empúries.
- 2002 Per les valls on es pon el sol, Edicions 62.
- 2004 Els arbres amics, Empúries.
- 2005 El salvatge dels Pirineus, Edicions 62.
- 2008 Les senyoretes de Lourdes, Proa.
- 2010 Nius, Proa.
- 2013 Dos taüts negres i dos de blancs, Proa.

=== Short stories ===
- 1989 Totes les dones es diuen Maria, Tres i Quatre.
- 1990 L'edat de les pedres, Empúries.

=== Collections of folktales ===
- 1986 Quan Judes era fadrí i sa mare festejava, La Magrana.
- 1993 Muntanyes Maleïdes, Empúries.
- 2003 El rei de la Val d'Aran, Empúries.
- 2006 Mentre el món serà món, Empúries.
- 2012 Llegendes d'arreu de Catalunya, La Galera.

=== Young adult and children's books ===
- 1988 El secret de la moixernera, Empúries.
- 1991 Què farem, què direm?, Cruïlla.
- 1991 La bruixa del Pla de Beret, Empúries.
- 1994 Mi Long, el drac de la perla, La Galera.
- 1994 Muntanyes mig-maleïdes, Empúries.
- 1995 Les bruixes del Pla de Negua, La Galera.
- 1996 La fada del mirall, La Galera.
- 1998 El tresor de la nit de Nadal, La Magrana.
- 2005 La corona de Sant Nicolau, Parc Nacional d'Aigüestortes.
- 2008 L'habitació de la meva germana, Empúries.
- 2009 El setè enemic del bosc, Estrella Polar.
- 2010 Retorn a les muntanyes Maleïdes, Estrella Polar.

=== Theatre ===
- 2004 La morisca de Gerri (unpublished work, represented annually at Plaça de Gerri de la Sal the last day of the Local Festival).
- 1997 Miracles de Santa Maria d'Àneu (unpublished work, performed every summer in Esterri d'Àneu with actors of this town).
- 2004 Crònica de Mur (unpublished work, premiered on September 19, 2004 at Castell de Mur, to mark the 1st Diada of Pallars Jussà).

=== Essays and literary criticism ===
- 1991 El parlar del Pallars, Empúries.
- 1996 Viatge al Pirineu fantàstic, Columna.
- 2010 Guia dels indrets mítics i llegendaris del Pallars Sobirà, París Edicions.
- 2012 Guia dels indrets mítics i llegendaris de la Ribagorça Romànica, Cossetània.

== Translated works ==
- Into Aragonese: http://www.escriptors.cat/autors/collp/obra.php?id_publi=13047
- Into Spanish: http://www.escriptors.cat/autors/collp/obra.php?id_publi=4854
- Into Basque: http://www.escriptors.cat/autors/collp/obra.php?id_publi=4858
- Into French: http://www.escriptors.cat/autors/collp/obra.php?id_publi=16274
- Into Italian: http://www.escriptors.cat/autors/collp/obra.php?id_publi=19254
- Into Occitan: http://www.escriptors.cat/autors/collp/obra.php?id_publi=19253

== Awards ==
- 1991 Premi Gran Angular de literatura juvenil by Què farem, què direm?
- 1993 Premi de la Crítica Serra d'Or a la millor novel·la juvenil by Què farem, què direm?
- 1994 Ramon Muntaner by El Pont de Mahoma
- 1996 Octavi Pellissa by El segle de la llum
- 1997 Lola Anglada by El tresor de la Nit de Nadal
- 2005 Sant Joan by El salvatge dels Pirineus
- 2007 Sant Jordi by Les senyoretes de Lourdes
- 2014 Premi Crexells, by Dos taüts negres i dos de blancsref name="Gene"/>
- 2014 Premi de la Crítica Catalana by Dos taüts negres i dos de blancs
- 2014 Premi Setè Cel by Dos taüts negres i dos de blancs
- 2015 Premi Joaquim Amat-Piniella by Dos taüts negres i dos de blancs
