= Casbas =

Casbas may refer to:

- Casbas Monastery
- Casbas de Huesca
- Casbas, Buenos Aires
