= Artau I of Pallars Sobirà =

Count in the eastern Pyrenees

Artau I (Latin: Artallus or Artaldus, Spanish: Artallo or Artaldo) was the Count of Pallars Sobirà from 1049 until his death in or around 1081. (Note: Artaus sometimes referred to himself as "margrave", as in comes et marchio (count and margrave) in a charter of 1059.) His reign was characterised by ceaseless wars and litigations with his more powerful cousin and neighbour Raymond IV of Pallars Jussà.

Artau was the second son of William II of Pallars Sobirà and his wife Stephanie, a daughter of Ermengol I of Urgell and Tetberga, who was related to either the Counts of Provence or Forez. His father died in 1035 and was succeeded by his eldest son, Bernard II. When he died in 1049, Artau became count. Artau married twice. Before September 1050, he married Constance, whose parentage is unknown. On or before 27 January 1058, Artau took, as his second wife, Lucia (Llúcia), daughter of Bernard I of La Marche and thus a sister of Almodis, the wife of Raymond Berengar I of Barcelona. He granted control of two castles to the count of Barcelona and four to his new wife on top of her dowry. (Note: Before 27 January 1058, "Artau I, count of Pallars Sobirà promised Ramón Berenguer I and Almodis, counts of Barcelona, that he would take LLúcia, sister of Almodis, as his wife and would give her six castles and their territories and rights two of which, Senterada and Toralla, would be under the suzerainty of the counts of Barcelona."(translation) Kosto suggests that Lucia was the daughter of Raymond Berengar I.) They had three sons: Artau II, his eldest son and heir; Ot, who became Bishop of Urgell; and William. She and Artau could also have been the parents of daughter named Maria.

In relation to his military operations both defensive and offensive directed against the county of Pallars Jussà, Artau constructed several new castles: Montcortés, Peramea, Bresca, and Baén. In 1064 Artau and Raymond of Pallars Jussà reached their first of several convenientia (agreements). Artau was forced to grant a castle to Raymond as a pledge to hold future negotiations. A second agreement of this sort was reached on 30 May 1067: Artau ceded the monastery of Santa Maria de Lavaix and quitclaimed several villages (villae) to Raymond. Around 1080 a series of convenientia were made between Raymond and either Artau I or Artau II. This time Raymond gave up the right to control (potestas) the castle of Talarn to two of his chief magnates, Pere Ramon I d'Erill and Mir Guirreta II de Bellera, while Artau granted the same of his castle of Salás to two of his men, Guillem Guitard de Vallferrera and Ramon Bernat. Both castles stood not far apart on opposite sides of the Noguera Pallaresa where it defined the border of the two counties. The final settlement and exchange of castles took place in the presence of Sancho Ramírez, King of Aragon. At the same time this Artau, whether father or son, came to an agreement with the king over a prior dispute.

Artau was a patron of the monastery of Santa Maria de Gerri. In a surviving pre-1070 charter dated to 18 June, Artau donated property to Santa Maria. In September 1050 he and Constance made a donation; (Note: This donation was Cuberes.) on 22 June 1059 he and Lucia; and he and Lucia again on 22 April 1068. Two further donations, of 8 July 1081 and 13 April 1082, throw into question the date of Artau's death and the succession of his son; the second donation was witnessed by another Artau, but this may be Artau III. Artau II was using the comital title as early as 1080. (Note: A charter of 8 August names Artallus comes [...] Neilonza comitissa, which is not Artau I)

== Bibliography ==
- Baiges, Ignasi J.; Feliu, Gaspar; Salrach, Josep M. (2010). Els pergamins de l'Arxiu Comptal de Barcelona, de Ramon Berenguer II a Ramon Berenguer IV (PDF) (in Catalan). Vol. I. Coordinators. Barcelona: Fundació Noguera. ISBN 978-84-9779-959-1. Archived from the original (PDF) on 28 December 2013.
- Kosto, Adam J. (2001). Making Agreements in Medieval Catalonia: Power, Order, and the Written Word, 1000–1200. Cambridge: Cambridge University Press. ISBN 9780511496530.
- Puig i Ferreté, I. M., ed. (1991), El Monestir de Santa Maria de Gerri (segles XI-XV) Collecció Diplomática, vol. II, Barcelona: Institut d'Estudis Catalans, ISBN 84-7283-193-0
