= County of Pallars Sobirà =

County in the Hispanic Marches

Coordinates: 42.4119°N 1.1317°E

Banner of arms of the Counts of Pallars.

Coat of arms of the Counts of Pallars.

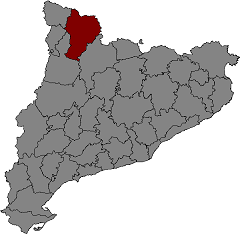
Location of the County of Pallars Sobirà within Catalonia.

The County of Pallars Sobirà or (Pallás) Sobirá, meaning Upper Pallars, was a county in the Hispanic Marches during the eleventh and twelfth centuries, long after the march had ceased to be effectively administered by the Kings of France. It was a division of the County of Pallars, which had been de facto, and possible de jure, independent since the late ninth century. It roughly corresponded with the modern Catalan comarca of Pallars Sobirà.

== Division and war in Pallars ==
In 1011, Sunyer of Pallars died and by his testament his county was divided between his sons, the eldest, Raymond III, receiving Pallars Jussà and the younger, William II, receiving Pallars Sobirà. Pallars Sobirà comprised the original heartland of the county of Pallars: the upper valley of the Noguera Pallaresa.

By the year 1000, the economic and social centre of Pallars was located in Pallars Jussà. It was wealthier than Pallars Sobirà and capable of expansion in the Reconquista against the Muslim territory to its south. During the eleventh century, the comital power in Pallars Jussà was violently reduced by the incessant attacks of Artau I of Pallars Sobirà in alliance with Ermengol III of Urgell. Because Pallars Jussà was so much richer and populous than the poor and mountainous Pallars Sobirà, the nobles of the latter country designed to eliminate the authority of Raymond IV in the former country. Artau himself was barely a count, rather more like the war leader of a band of powerful feudatories whose objective was the pillage of the wealthier rural communities of the lower territories of Pallars Jussà and the repeal of their rights of tax exemption and other immunities. The peasants of Pallars Sobirà were heavily burdened by arbitrary exactions, forced labour, and military service. The barons had the right to exact toltae, forciae, and usatici, that is, "customary levies." In the ensuing war, Raymond IV lost most of his fortresses, including his capital, Segur, to Sobirà. However peace was established between the two countries and Raymond regained his position after Artau's death. Artau's son, Artau II (1081–1124), is recorded as never having fought with his relatives of Pallars Jussà.

== High Middle Ages ==
Pallars Sobirà was isolated high in the Pyrenees and of no importance to affairs in Catalonia on a larger scale. Artau III and Artau IV are barely more than names and neither they nor their successors took part in the succession to the county of Pallars Jussà before it passed to the County of Barcelona in 1192.

By 1199, Pallars Sobirà was inherited by a woman, Guillelma, who sold her county to her husband, Roger of Comminges, and retired to a convent.

In 1295, Ramon Roger I, the fourth Count from the Comminges dynasty, died with children and was succeeded by Sibil·la I, the eldest daughter of his deceased brother Arnau Roger. She married Baron Hug de Mataplana, with domains in Alt Berguedà and Ripollès. With this marriage, the reign of the third dynasty of Pallars began: the Mataplana's.

Between 1298 and 1332, the Counts of Pallars Sobirà of had to repel three attacks by the Viscounts of Couserans, who had the support of the Counts of Foix and the Kings of France.
The last Count of Pallars Sobirà was Hugh Roger III of Pallars Sobirà, who led the army of the Council of the Principality of Catalonia during the Catalan Civil War, and who lost his County to the Crown in 1487 after being defeated in the War and subsequent rebellions.

== List of counts ==
=== House of Pallars ===
- William II (1011–1035)
- Bernard II (1035–1049)
- Artau I (1049–1081)
- Artau II (1081–1124)
- Artau III (1124–1167)
- Artau IV (1167–1180/1182)
- Bernard III (1180/1182–1199)
- Guillemina (1199–1229)

=== House of Comminges (or Couserans) ===
- Roger I (1229–1240)
- Roger II (1240–1256)
- Arnau Roger I (1256–1288)
- Raymond Roger I (1288–1295)
- Sibil·la (1295–1330)

=== House of Mataplana ===
- Arnau Roger II (1330–1343)
- Raymond Roger II (1343–1350)
- Hugh Roger I (1350–1366)
- Arnau Roger III (1366–1369)
- Hugh Roger II (1369–1416)
- Roger Bernard I (1416–1424)
- Bernard Roger I (1424–1442)
- Arnau Roger IV (1442–1451)
- Hugh Roger III (1451–1487)

== Sources ==
- Freedman, Paul. "Military Orders and Peasant Servitude in Catalonia: Twelfth and Thirteenth Centuries." The Hispanic American Historical Review, Vol. 65, No. 1. (Feb., 1985), pp 91–110.
