= Arnau Mir =

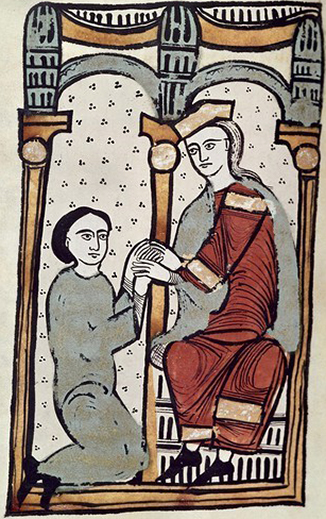
Arnau commending himself to Ermengol II of Urgell for the castle of Àger. From the Liber feudorum maior.

Arnau (or Arnal) Mir (died 1174) was the Count of Pallars Jussà from 1124/6 until his death.

The Memoria renovata, which dates to the reign of Raymond Berengar IV of Barcelona over the Kingdom of Aragon, contains a genealogy of Arnau Mir. The author of the Memoria was dedicated to justifying the independence of the County of Ribagorza from both Aragon and Navarre and probably saw Arnau Mir as the strongest candidate with connexions to the old line of the counts of Ribagorza who could resist the regional hegemonic powers.

In 1140, when William, Archbishop of Arles, acting as Papal legate, arbitrated the disputed boundary between the dioceses of Roda and Urgell, he did so "with the advice" (cum consilio) of Arnau Mir, who also signed the written agreement (convenientia) as a witness. Among the other magnates consulted for advice on this occasion were the Count of Pallars Sobirà, Artau III, and Arnau's vassal Ramon Pere II d'Erill. Arnau held the city of Fraga as a vassal of Alfonso II of Aragon and Ramon Pere held it from Arnau.

There is a surviving document recording the many disputes between Arnau Mir and Ramon Pere, but the record of their settlement (iuditium) is incomplete. There is also a record of the hostages Ramon posted as sureties. Among the crimes of which Arnau accused Ramon were:

- stealing 990 sheep "within the boundaries of Fraga ... from the men of the Count of Pallars and the King"
- capturing Arnau's vassal and "shield bearer", Berenguer de Benevent, and plundering his lands of assets valued at 995 gold florins
- forcing Pere de Bardet, a vassal of Arnau, to become his vassal "under constraint"
- refusing to render "fief service" to Arnau and his son, Raymond V, even though he was a liege vassal
- defaulting on his debts to Arnau's other vassals
- illegally confiscating fiefs worth 990 solidi in Vallebona and Bonausa
- allowing his vassals to plunder the inhabitants of Val Benasc of 994 solidi

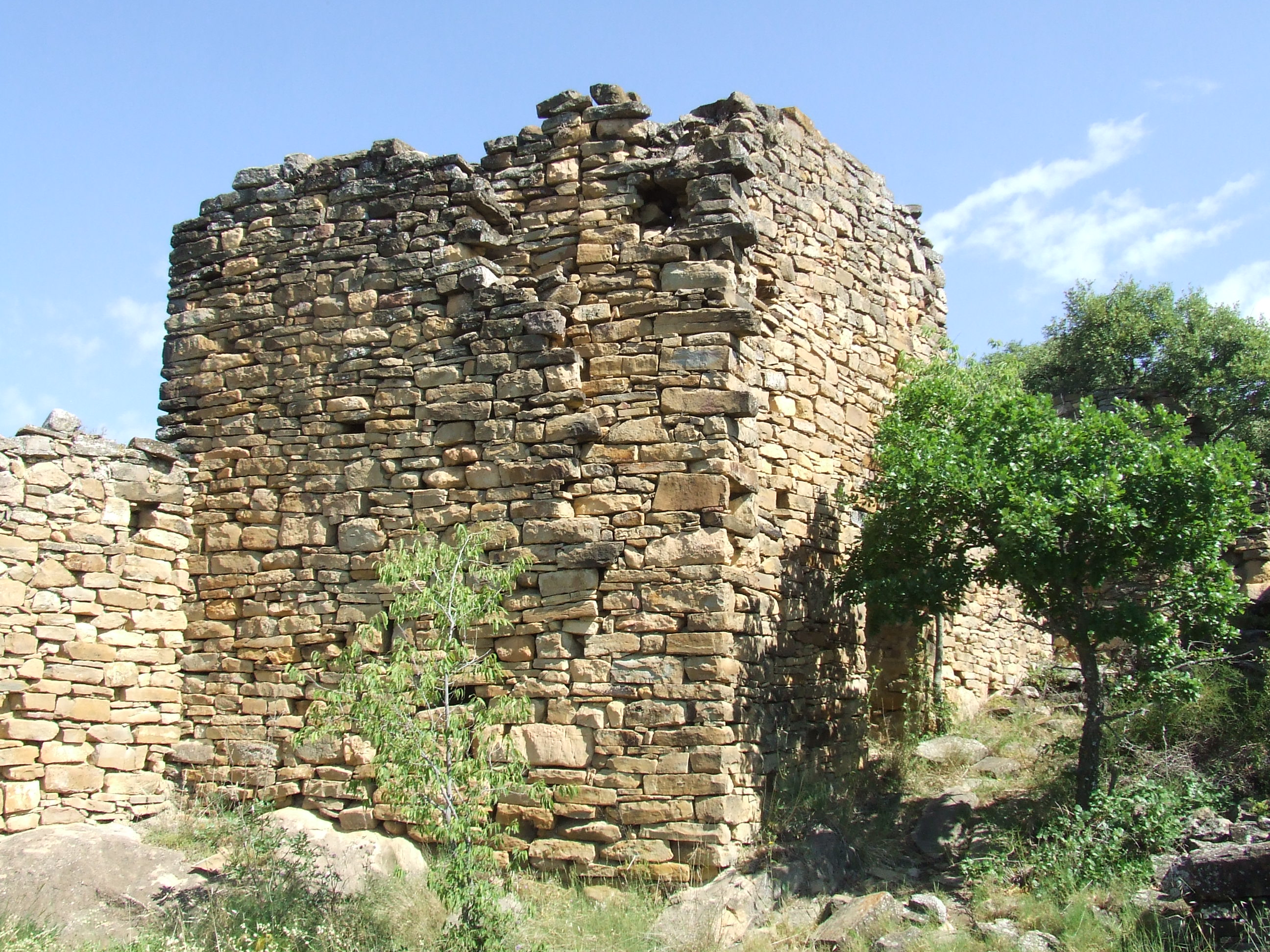
Ruins of the castle of Castelló d'Encús

Berenguer de Benevent had placed himself and his fief under the protection/authority/command of Arnau, so that he might act as a surety for Arnau and for Ramon d'Erill if Arnau required it. Arnau issued a special charter of protection for Berenguer, which Ramon broke. On Ramon's advice Arnau had established a fair at Casteglo (perhaps Castelló d'Encús), but Ramon proceeded to establish a competing fair in his own territory and forbade his own men from attending Arnau's fair. When Arnau was going to confiscate Ramon's fief of Val d'Aran, the latter sent Ramon de Valsegne as a pledge to the count for the 1,000 solidi he owed. The latter Ramon was invested with Aran, but Ramon d'Erill took it from him and the "damage" to Arnau was 990 solidi.

After Arnau was captured in war with Sancho VI of Navarre, he placed his "patrimony and vassals" under Ramon, who pledged to observe with them the same Truce of God he observed with his own vassals, Arnau pledged to respect Ramon's vassals the same way. During the period of Arnau's captivity, however, Ramon's vassals plundered Arnau and his vassals of 900 solidi in damages. In Lleida and Agramunt Ramon accepted a pledge from Ermengol VI of Urgell which he did not repay. Arnau was thus forced to agree with Ramon and Ermengol not to force the former to pay it and not to go himself or to allow his vassals to go to either Lleida or Agramunt.

Arnau had disputes with his other vassals. It is recorded that one Berivizio wounded Pere de Castellnou, Arnau's liege vassal and nephew, and also murdered a man named Ros from Montanyana. Another vassal of the count, Ramón de San Saturnino, stole twenty mules and asses from Sanç de Lirio.

With his wife, Oria d'Entença, Arnau founded the monastery of Santa María de la Gloria at Casbas de Huesca.
