= Goltregoda of Cerdanya =

Goltregoda of Cerdanya (c. 920-963) was countess consort of Pallars by marriage to Lope I of Pallars and regent of the County of Pallars in 948-953 during the minority of her sons Borrell I of Pallars and Raymond II of Pallars.

== Life ==
She was born to Miró II of Cerdanya. In 925, her father gave her the fief of Vilanova. She married count Lope of Pallars. Goltregoda played an important political role in Pallars.

After the death of her spouse in 948, she ruled as regent during the minority of her two sons. Not much is known of the events in Pallars during her regency, but her signature appears on state documents. In 953, she made her last signature on a state document as regent: after this year, her sons signed all documents and are assumed to no longer be under her regency.

Children

- Raymond II of Pallars
- Borrell I of Pallars
- Suñer I
- Sunifredo
- Riquilda
