= Raymond IV of Pallars Jussà =

Raymond IV (Catalan: Ramon, Latin: Reimundus, Raimundus) was the Count of Pallars Jussà from 1047 until his death in 1098. He was the son and successor of Raymond III and Ermessenda. His reign was characterised by ceaseless wars and litigations with his cousins Artau I and Artau II of Pallars Sobirà, yet it was transformative in the history of Pallars through the new modes of exercising comital power that Raymond introduced. The viscounties of Pallars Jussà during the time of Raymond IV were Vilamur, Bellera, and Orcau.

There is a rather large and well-preserved series of records for the reign of Raymond IV largely because he pioneered the use of written conventions for the making of agreements in Pallars. In this he was helped along by the same scribe who had at times served his father since 1040 and who had worked at the court of his father-in-law Arnau Mir de Tost for some time, Vidal.

== Establishing his power ==
Early in his reign Raymond exacted a collective oath from the general public, claiming to rely on precedent established earlier that century by his father Raymond III and uncle William II of Pallars Sobirà. His action in fact harkened back to the original public function of the count during Carolingian times. He renewed the collective oath a second time at a later date.

In 1055 Raymond married Valença, daughter of Arnau Mir de Tost, and granted him four castles as a pledge to keep the oaths he had sworn for her hand. She acted alongside him in many of his charters and conventions. In 1056–1057 Raymond and Valença ceded their "power" (potestas) over the castle of Orcau to Ramon Mir and his wife Maria. In 1088 they renewed the concession to Ramon Mir's son Tedball Ramon. This and similar actions have led certain historians to consider Raymond weak in relation to his vassals. He was even forced out of power at one point, but had regained it by the early 1070s. Raymond had three sons by Valença: Pere Ramon, Arnau Ramon, and Bernat Ramon. The eldest two succeeded him and ruled jointly until around 1112, when they were succeeded by their brother Bernat, who ruled until 1124.

Raymond did take part in the Reconquista of Muslim lands. He promised the vills and castles of the Vallferrera to Orset and Drogo after their reconquest.

== Quarrels with his cousins ==
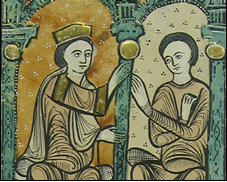
A page of the 12th-century manuscript Liber Feudorum Maior illustrating the moment when Count Raymond and Ficapal, spouse of Sibila and vassal of the count, reached an agreement on the castles of Guilareny and Vallferrera

In 1064 Raymond and Artau I reached their first agreement (convenientia, "convention"), which saw a castle pass to Raymond as a pledge for future negotiations. A second agreement of 30 May 1067 saw Artau cede the monastery of Santa Maria de Lavaix to Raymond and quitclaim several villages (villae). Around 1080 a series of conventions were made between Raymond and either Artau I or II (the elder died around 1081). As a guarantee for the process, Raymond granted the potestas of the castle of Talarn to two of his chief magnates, Pere Ramon I d'Erill and Mir Guirreta II de Bellera, while Artau granted the same of his castle of Salás to two of his men, Guillem Guitard de Vallferrera and Ramon Bernat. Both castles stood not far apart on opposite sides of the Noguera Pallaresa where it defined the border of the two counties. The final settlement and exchange of castles took place in the presence of Sancho Ramírez, King of Aragon. On 20 July 1094 Raymond commended (as fiefs) Llimiana and Mur to Artau II and granted him (as allods) Castellet, Claverol, and Vall d'Escós.

In September 1097 Raymond received the baiulia (protection) and receptum (payment) of Castellet from Ramon Mir and Ramon Arnau. Whether Castellet had been reclaimed by treaty or by force from Artau II is unknown. On another front Raymond was an adversary of the Ermengol III of Urgell, who had been his father's erstwhile enemy and was his father-in-law's suzerain and frequent rival. He was unable, however, to prevent the Conca de Tremp from being annexed by Urgell.

== Sources ==
- Kosto, Adam J. (2001). Making Agreements in Medieval Catalonia: Power, Order, and the Written Word, 1000–1200. Cambridge: Cambridge University Press. ISBN 0521792398.
- Stasser, Thierry (1996). "Origine familiale de trois comtesses de Pallars". Anuario de Estudios Medievales. 26 (1): 3–18. doi:10.3989/aem.1996.v26.i1.685.
