= Raymond V =

Raymond V may refer to:

- Raymond V of Toulouse (r. 1148–1194)
- Raymond V of Pallars Jussà (r. 1174–1177), count
