= Raymond V of Pallars Jussà =

Raymond V or Raymond VI (Catalan: Ramon, Spanish: Raimundo) was the count of Pallars Jussà from 1174 until his death in 1177. He succeeded his father, Arnau Mir, who had associated him with the government of the county late in his reign.

Raymond was born around 1146, shortly after his parents' marriage. His mother was Oria d'Entença. When he was a minor in 1157, his father drew up a will giving suzerainty over his county to the Order of the Hospital and placing his son under the guardianship of Count Raymond Berengar IV of Barcelona until he came of age. In 1167, Raymond married Anglesa, daughter of Viscount Ramon Folc III de Cardona. His father's will was amended in 1171, but the overlordship of the Hospitallers was left intact. When Raymond succeeded his father upon the latter's death in 1174, he refused to recognize the rights of the Hospitallers.

A surviving record of feudal obligations (a custumal) on parchment from the county of Pallars Jussà (now manuscript ACÁ Extrainventari 3411) dates to the reign of Raymond V and was probably drawn up at his orders early in his reign (around 1175). It is not exhaustive of the county or its resources but is interested primarily in the military obligations the count could call upon as feudal overlord. It lists 32 tenures and names 18 tenants plus castellans and knights. At least eight of the tenures owing service lay outside of Pallars Jussà. These formed an honour that Raymond himself had acquired in the counties of Cerdagne and Conflent. Among the count's vassals were the viscount of Fenouillèdes and Galceran III de Pinós. Raymond was in turn a vassal of the king of Aragon for the tenencias of Fraga (1174–1175) and Ricla (1174).

Raymond drew up a final will on 4 September 1177. He was dead by 15 September, when he was buried in the monastery of Casbas. He was the last male count of Pallars Jussà. He left the county to his underage daughter, Valença, placing her under the regency of King Alfonso I of Aragon.

== Sources ==
- Bisson, Thomas N. (1987). "The Feudal Domain of Pallars Jussà (c. 1175): A Record of Obligations and Custom" (PDF). Medievalia. 7: 73–84.
- Ruiz-Domènec, J. E. (1995). "Oria, condesa de Pallars: una dama catalana del siglo XII". Medievalia. 12: 7–12. Archived from the original on 2017-03-12.
- Salazar y Acha, Jaime de (2021). Las dinastías reales de España en la Edad Media (PDF). Real Academia de la Historia.
- Sobrequés i Vidal, Santiago (1961). Els barons de Catalunya. Editorial Vicens-Vives.
