= Borrell I of Pallars =

Count of Pallars from 948 to 995

Borrell I (Spanish: Borrell I de Pallars) was the sovereign Count of Pallars from 948 to 995.

== Life ==
Count Borrell was a son of the Count Lope I of Pallars and Goltregoda of Cerdanya.

Until at least 953, he was a minor under the regency of his mother. Borrell ruled Pallars together with his brothers, Raymond II of Pallars and Suñer I.

He was married to Lady Ermentruda.

Issue

- Ermengol I of Pallars
- Isarn (Ysarn)
- Miró
- William
- Ermengarda
- Ava
