= Lope I of Pallars =

Catalan nobleman (Count of Pallars) 900–948

Count Lope I (died in 948) was the Count of Pallars (then part of West Francia), ruling jointly with his brother Isarn from 920.

== Life ==
Lope was son of Raymond I, Count of Pallars and Ribagorza and thus a brother of Isarn, as well as of Bernard I and Miro of Ribagorza. He would seem also to have been brother of Ato, Bishop of Pallars, who was called brother of Bernard and who collaborated with the latter and with Isarn in fighting the Moors who had overrun their counties. During Lope's joint reign, Isarn seems to have taken the lead, and Isarn appears to have outlived Lope, being directly succeeded by Lope's sons.

Lope was married to Goltregoda of Cerdanya.

Issue

- Raymond II of Pallars
- Borrell I of Pallars
- Suñer I
- Sunifredo
- Riquilda

Lope was eventually succeeded by his sons.
