= Aramunt =

- Locality
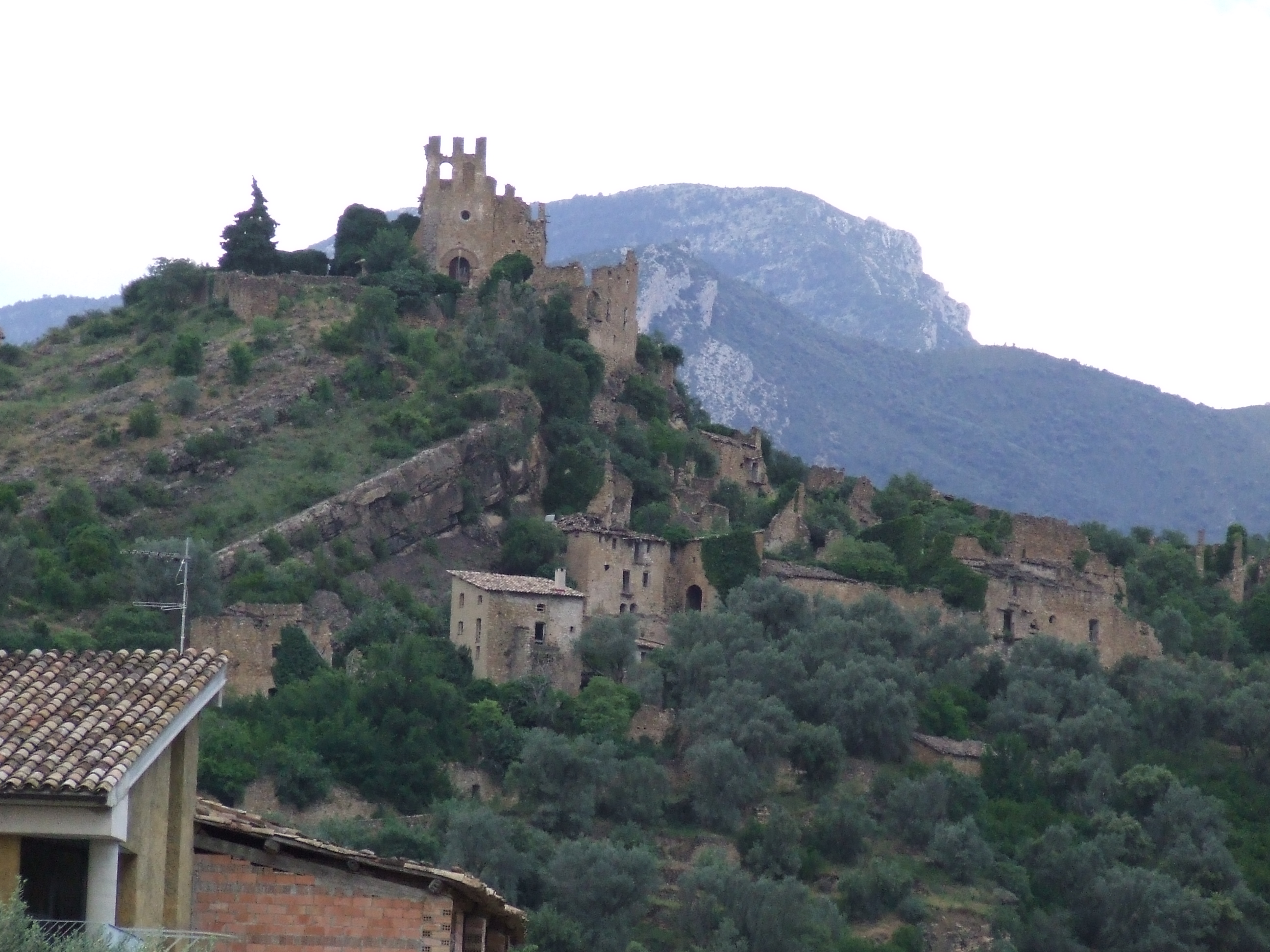

- Location within Province of Lleida Location within Catalonia Location within Spain
- Coordinates: 42°12′7″N 0°59′22″E
- Country: Spain
- Community: Catalonia
- Province: Lleida
- Municipality: Conca de Dalt
- Elevation: 553 m (1,814 ft)

Population
  - Total: 91

Aramunt (Catalan pronunciation: [aɾaˈmun]) is a locality located in the municipality of Conca de Dalt, in Province of Lleida province, Catalonia, Spain. As of 2020, it has a population of 91.

== Geography ==
Aramunt is located 110km north-northeast of Lleida.
