= Erinyà =

- Locality
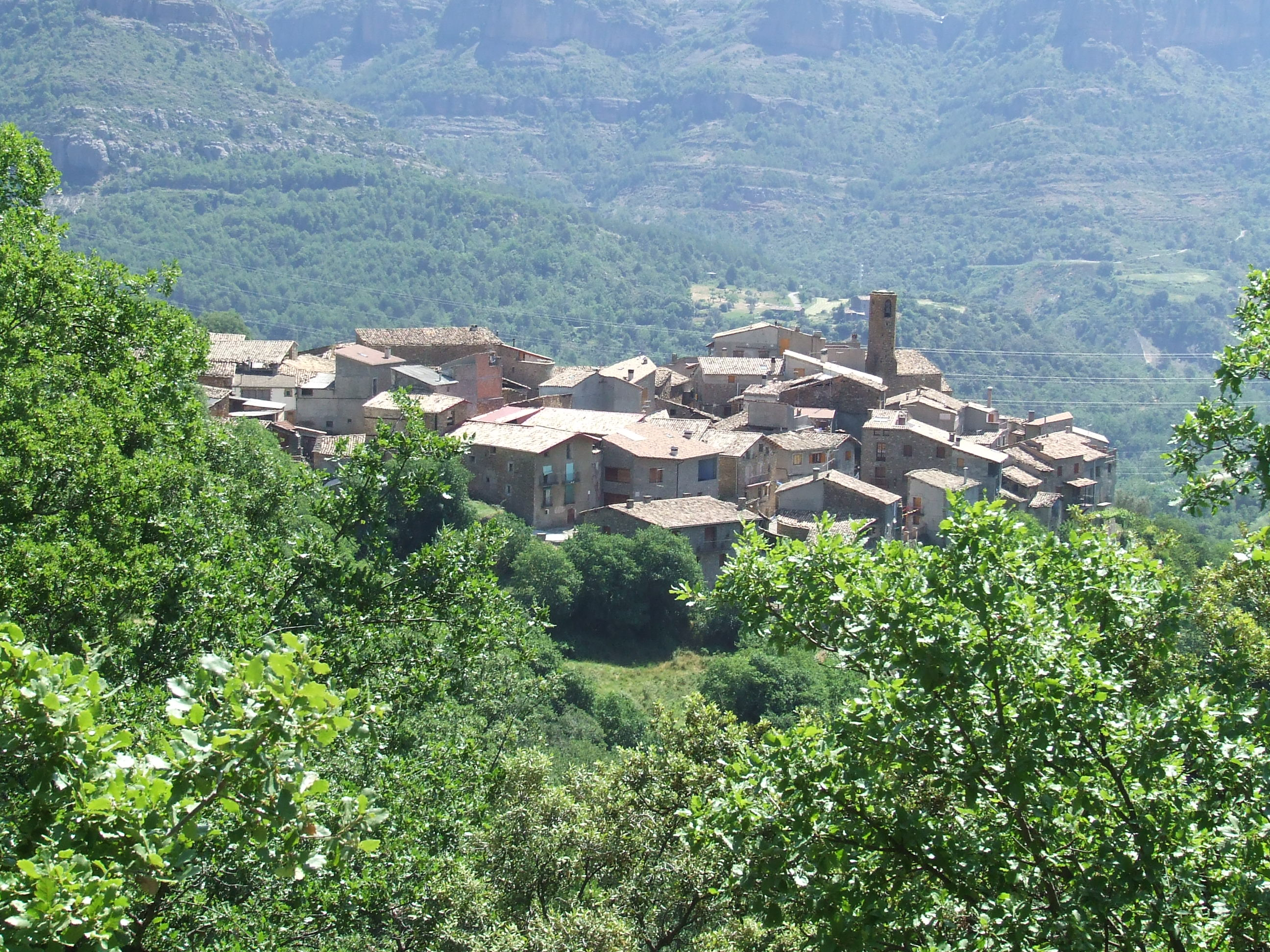

- Location within Province of Lleida Location within Catalonia Location within Spain
- Coordinates: 42°16′33″N 0°55′39″E
- Country: Spain
- Community: Catalonia
- Province: Lleida
- Municipality: Conca de Dalt
- Elevation: 731 m (2,398 ft)

Population
  - Total: 30

Erinyà (Catalan pronunciation: [eɾiˈɲa]) is a locality located in the municipality of Conca de Dalt, in Province of Lleida, Catalonia, Spain. As of 2020, it has a population of 30.

== Geography ==
Erinyà is located 111 km north-northeast of Lleida.
