= Battle of Corbins =

Battle of Corbins (1126)
- Part of the Reconquista
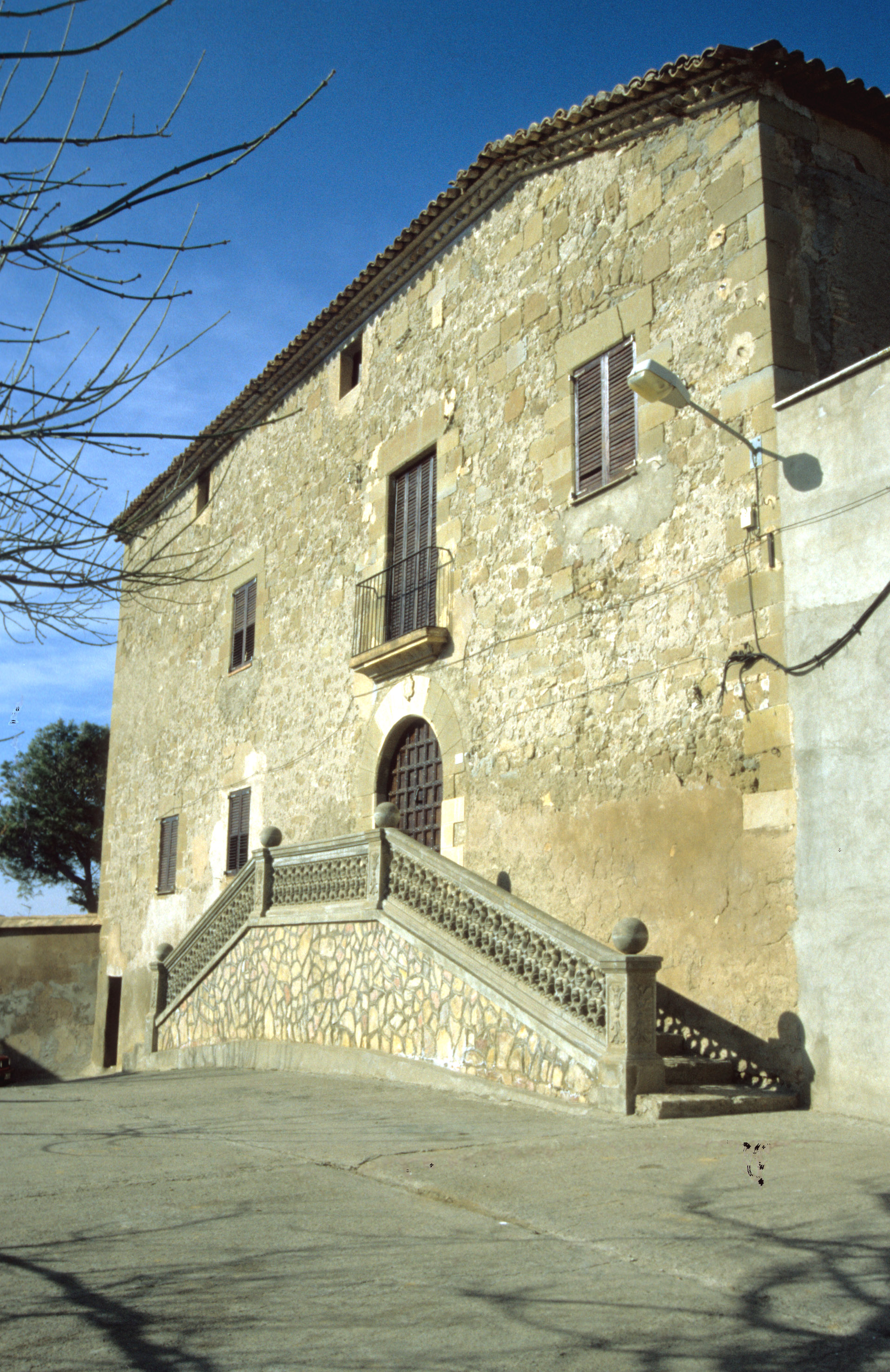
- Corbins castle
Date	1126
Location	Corbins, Zaragoza
Result	Almoravid victory

Belligerents
Almoravid dynasty	County of Barcelona; County of Pallars Jussà; County of Urgell

Commanders and leaders
Abdulla ibn Iyad	Ramon Berenguer III; Bernard Raymond †; Ermengol VI

Strength
Unknown	Unknown

Casualties and losses
Unknown	Few survived

The Battle of Corbins occurred in 1126 when the army of Abdulla ibn Iyad, the Almoravid governor of Lleida, defeated the Catalan forces of Ramon Berenguer III, Count of Barcelona near the Almoravid castle at Corbins, Zaragoza.

== Background ==
Following the conquest of the city of Zaragoza in 1118, Alfonso the Battler, King of Aragón and Pamplona continued his campaign to take control of the Ebro River valley. Between the city of Zaragoza and the Christian County of Barcelona on the Mediterranean Sea, the territory stood as an open frontier held by the Almoravids. In that territory, the fortified city of Lleida remained under the control of the Muslims and separated the two Christian principalities.

Both Alfonso and Berenguer desired to eventually take control of the city of Lleida and to add it to their respective domains. After the fall of the city of Zaragoza, the Muslim governor of Lleida at that time, Abu Hilal, felt threatened by Alfonso and sought the protection of Berenguer by means of an alliance. In 1120, Abu Hilal and Berenguer entered into a pact whereby Berenguer agreed that he would defend Lleida against attack by Alfonso.

In 1123, Alfonso attacked Lleida. The siege ended in failure due to Berenguer 's intervention. Three years later, however, Berenguer was ready to implement his own plan to attack and capture Lleida. The agreement that Berenguer had with the Almoravids was simply a tactic to keep the city from Alfonso and to delay his own invasion of the territory until he was strong enough to capture the city by himself.

After 1123, Berenguer’s desire to initiate a campaign of his own against Lleida was boosted by two developments. Relative to military alliances, Berenguer and Ponç II, the Count of Empúries, implemented an agreement stipulating that Ponç II would assist the Catalans in the defense and/or conquest of frontier territories. Relative to resources, Berenguer gained the full support of the Catholic Church by means of Pope Callixtus II’s Papal bull granting indulgences for those fighting to restore the churches in Iberia. This elevated the conflict with the Muslims from a territorial dispute to a holy war.

With these developments, Berenguer began to build an enhanced military force by ordering nobles and landowners with rights to ecclesiastic tithes to participate in the crusade. In the opinion of the Almoravids, this action was threatening and broke the pact that they had in place with Berenguer. This division between the Almoravids and Berenguer quickly led to direct conflict.

== The battle ==
In 1126, ibn Iyad undertook a punitive campaign into Catalan territory in response to Berenguer’s military build-up and threatening posture. From Lleida, ibn Iyad advanced northeast up the Segre and Noguera Ribagorçana River valleys into the Catalan County of Urgell. Along the way, the Almoravids destroyed the fields and settlements in an effort to deprive potential invaders of the resources and foodstuffs that would be needed to besiege a fortress and sustain an army. After Berenguer became aware of the Almoravid incursion, he mobilized his Catalan allies including Bernard Raymond, the Count of Pallars Jussà, and Ermengol VI, the Count of Urgell. Immediately thereafter, the Catalan force set out to intercept the Muslim army before it further destabilized the northern frontier.

The two armies met near the Almoravid castle at Corbins not far from the confluence of the Segre and Noguera Ribagorzana Rivers. While little detail is actually known regarding the battle, historians believe that Almoravid military tactics proven on earlier battlefields such as Sagrajas and Uclés would have been used against the mounted Catalan crusaders. Such tactics would have included a defensive phalanx, followed by archers and slingers, supported by a mobile cavalry reserve.

Ibn Iyad’s numerical superiority along with the use of a disciplined infantry allowed him to overcome Berenguer’s heavy cavalry in a resounding victory. Few Catalans survived the battle. Among the Catalan knights perishing in the battle was Bernard Raymond, Count of Pallars Jussà.

== Aftermath ==
The Battle of Corbins was a watershed moment that impacted the northern frontier for two decades. First of all, the Almoravids pushed the Christian borders back impacting the Country of Urgell, particularly the territory between the cities of Albesa and Térmens. In addition, the victory ended the Almoravid-Catalan protectorate arrangements in that the Almoravids proved that they could protect themselves and no longer needed to pay tribute as a client state. And finally, the devasting loss convinced Berenguer that he could not conquest Lleida without assistance. As a result, in the years after the battle, Berenguer formed an alliance with his rival, Alfonso the Battler, directed at taking control of the northern Almoravid frontier.

Even with the new alliance, Lleida continued to endure as an Almoravid stronghold for approximately two decades. Ultimately, Lleida will fall to the Christians after a siege in 1149.
