= Hortoneda (Conca de Dalt) =

- Locality
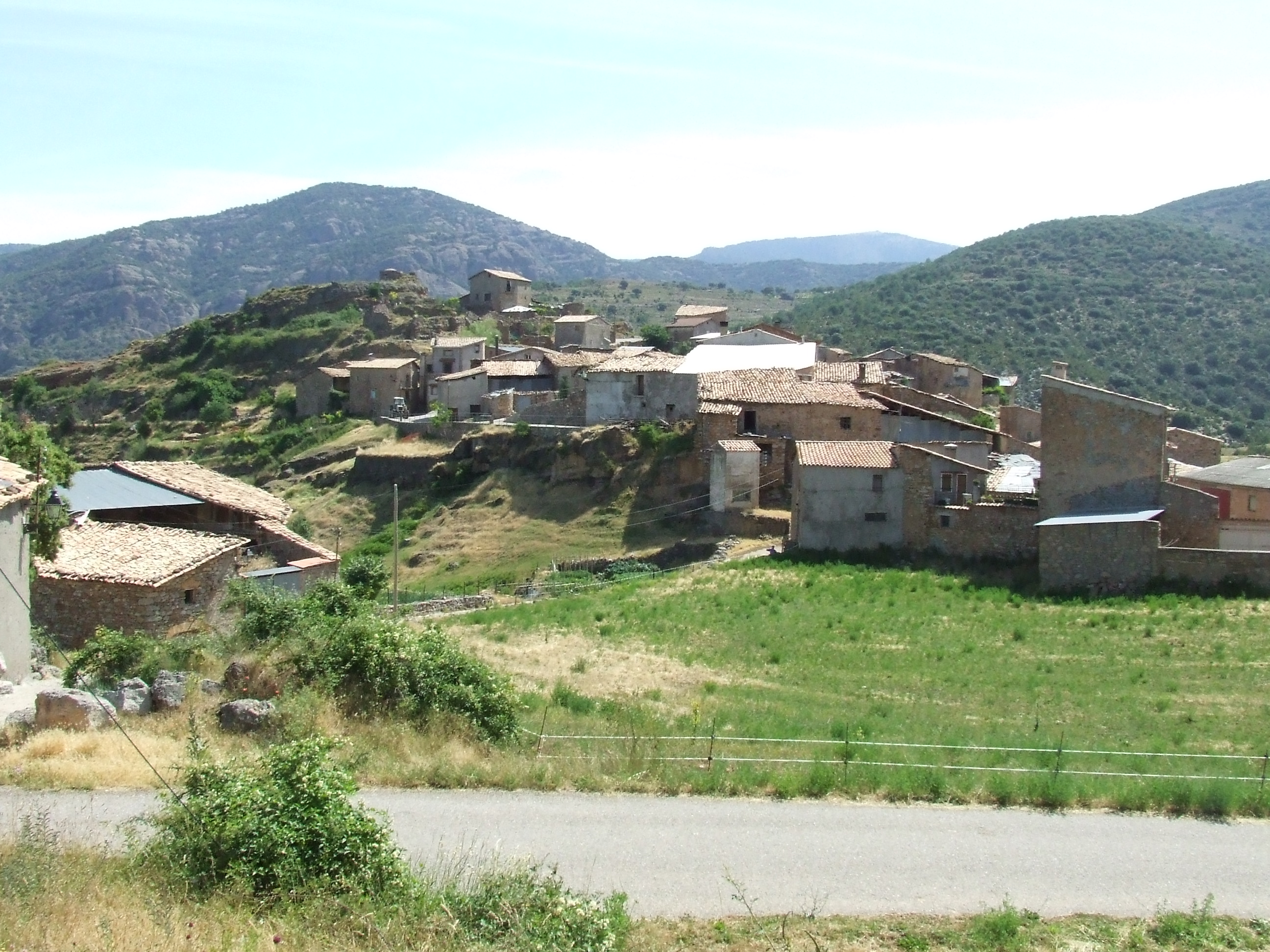

- Location within Province of Lleida Location within Catalonia Location within Spain
- Coordinates: 42°14′45″N 1°2′36″E
- Country: Spain
- Community: Catalonia
- Province: Lleida
- Municipality: Conca de Dalt
- Elevation: 1,000 m (3,300 ft)

Population
  - Total: 29

Hortoneda is a hamlet located in the municipality of Conca de Dalt, in Province of Lleida province, Catalonia, Spain. As of 2020, it has a population of 29.

== Geography ==
Hortoneda is located 117km north-northeast of Lleida.
