= Sant Martí de Canals =

- Locality
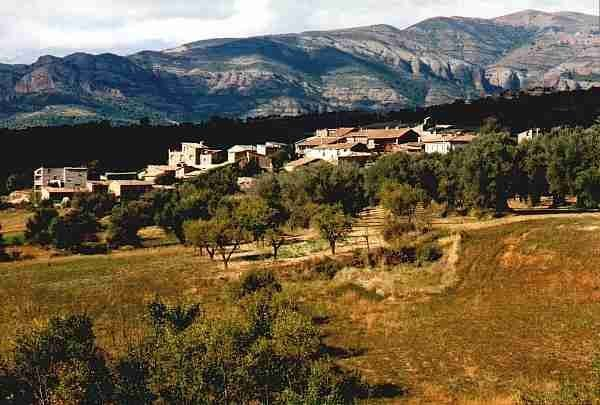

- Location within Province of Lleida Location within Catalonia Location within Spain
- Coordinates: 42°13′31″N 0°59′25″E
- Country: Spain
- Community: Catalonia
- Province: Lleida
- Municipality: Conca de Dalt
- Elevation: 649 m (2,129 ft)

Population
  - Total: 37

Sant Martí de Canals (Catalan pronunciation: [ˈsam maɾˈti ðe kaˈnals]) is a village located in the municipality of Conca de Dalt, in Province of Lleida province, Catalonia, Spain. As of 2020, it has a population of 37.

== Geography ==
Sant Martí de Canals is located 108km north-northeast of Lleida.
