= Torallola =

- Locality
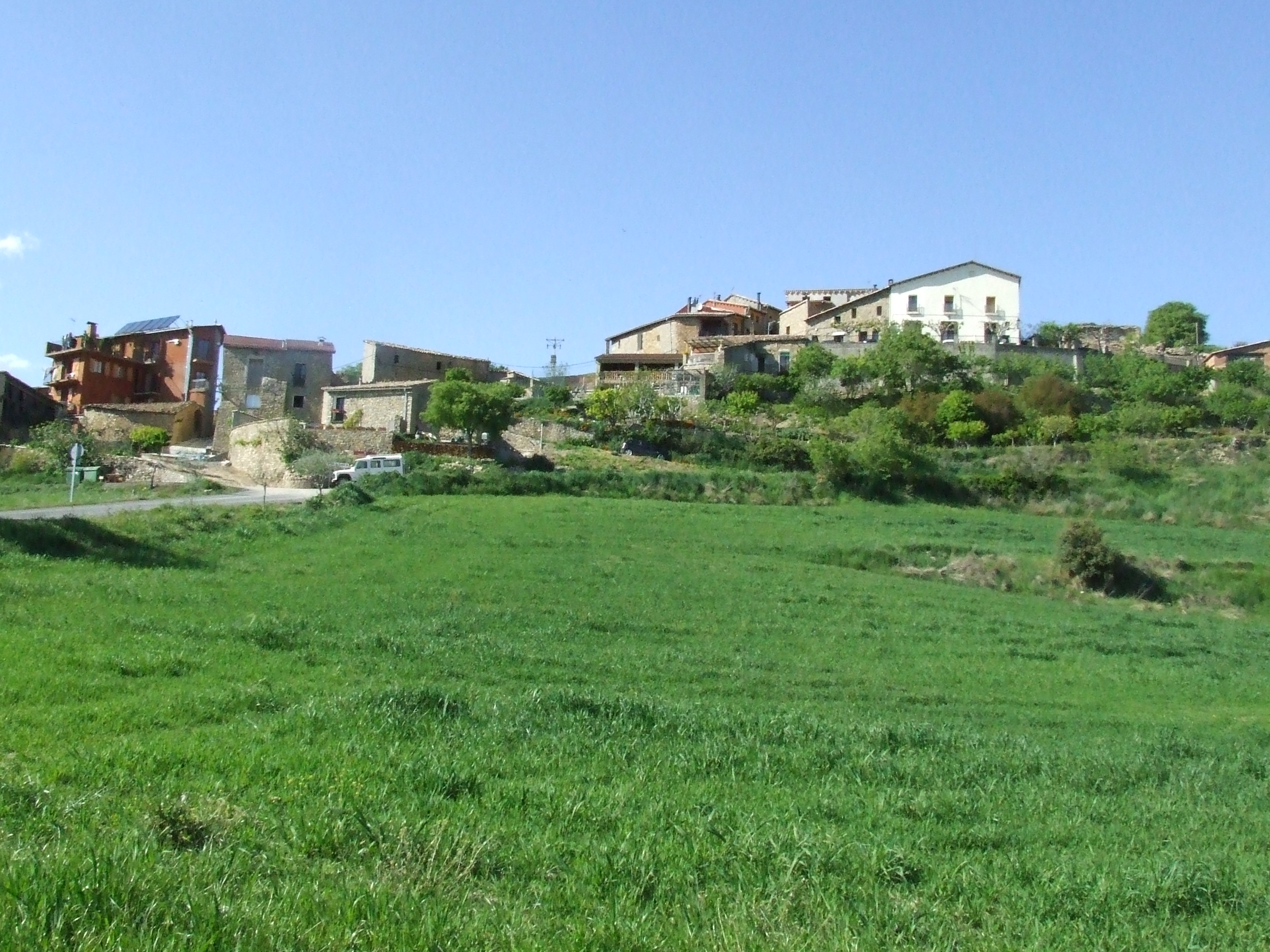

- Location within Province of Lleida Location within Catalonia Location within Spain
- Coordinates: 42°14′27″N 0°56′17″E
- Country: Spain
- Community: Catalonia
- Province: Lleida
- Municipality: Conca de Dalt
- Elevation: 767 m (2,516 ft)

Population
  - Total: 18

Torallola (Catalan pronunciation: [toɾaˈʎɔla]) is a hamlet located in the municipality of Conca de Dalt, in Province of Lleida province, Catalonia, Spain. As of 2020, it has a population of 18.

== Geography ==
Torallola is located 106km north-northeast of Lleida.
