= Sossís =

- Decentralized municipal entity
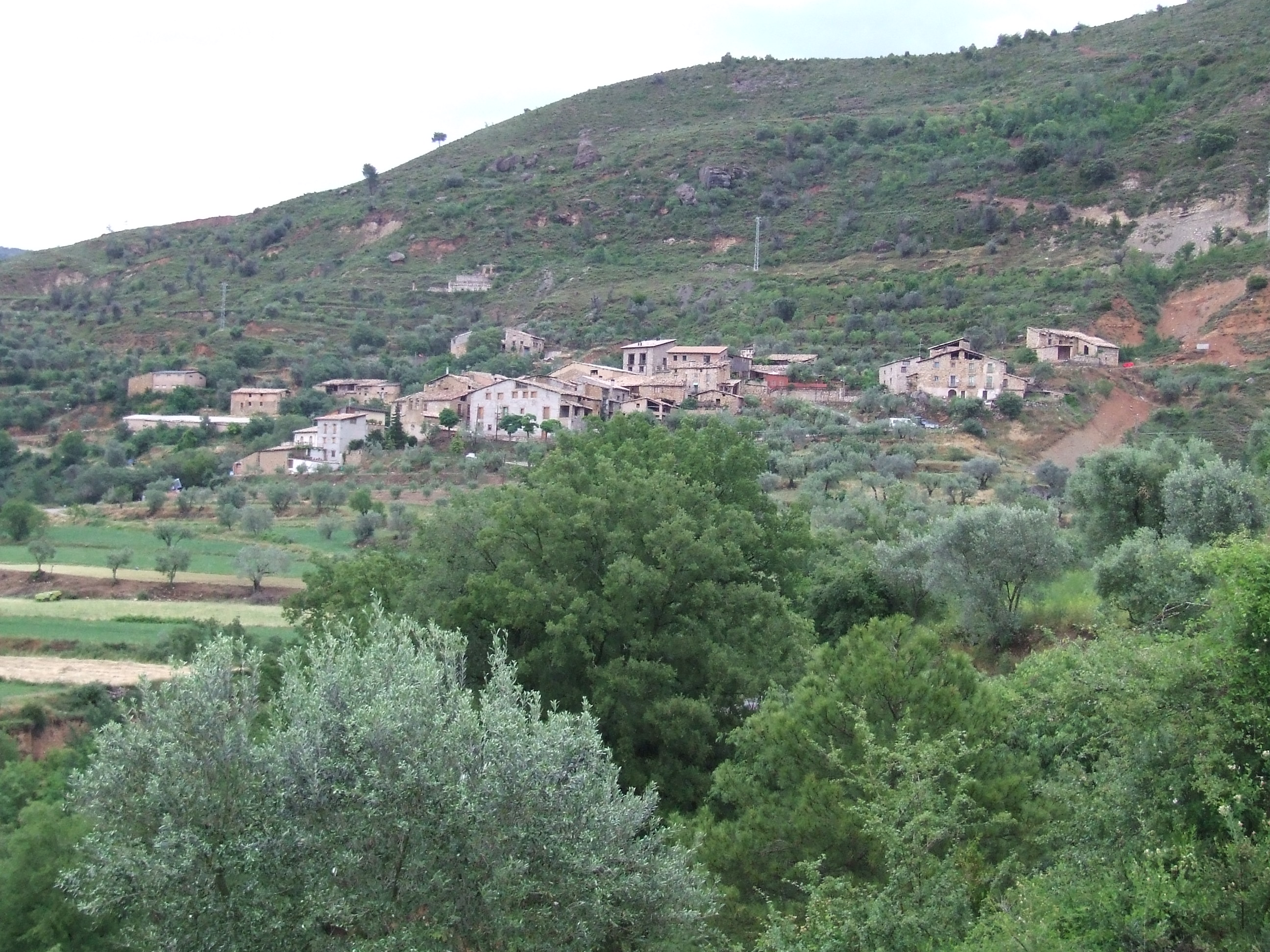

- Location within Province of Lleida Location within Catalonia Location within Spain
- Coordinates: 42°15′15″N 0°59′11″E
- Country: Spain
- Community: Catalonia
- Province: Lleida
- Municipality: Conca de Dalt
- Elevation: 612 m (2,008 ft)

Population
  - Total: 26

Sossís (Catalan pronunciation: [soˈsis]) is a locality and decentralized municipal entity located in the municipality of Conca de Dalt, in Province of Lleida province, Catalonia, Spain. As of 2020, it has a population of 26.

== Geography ==
Sossís is located 109km north-northeast of Lleida.
