= Rivert =

- Locality
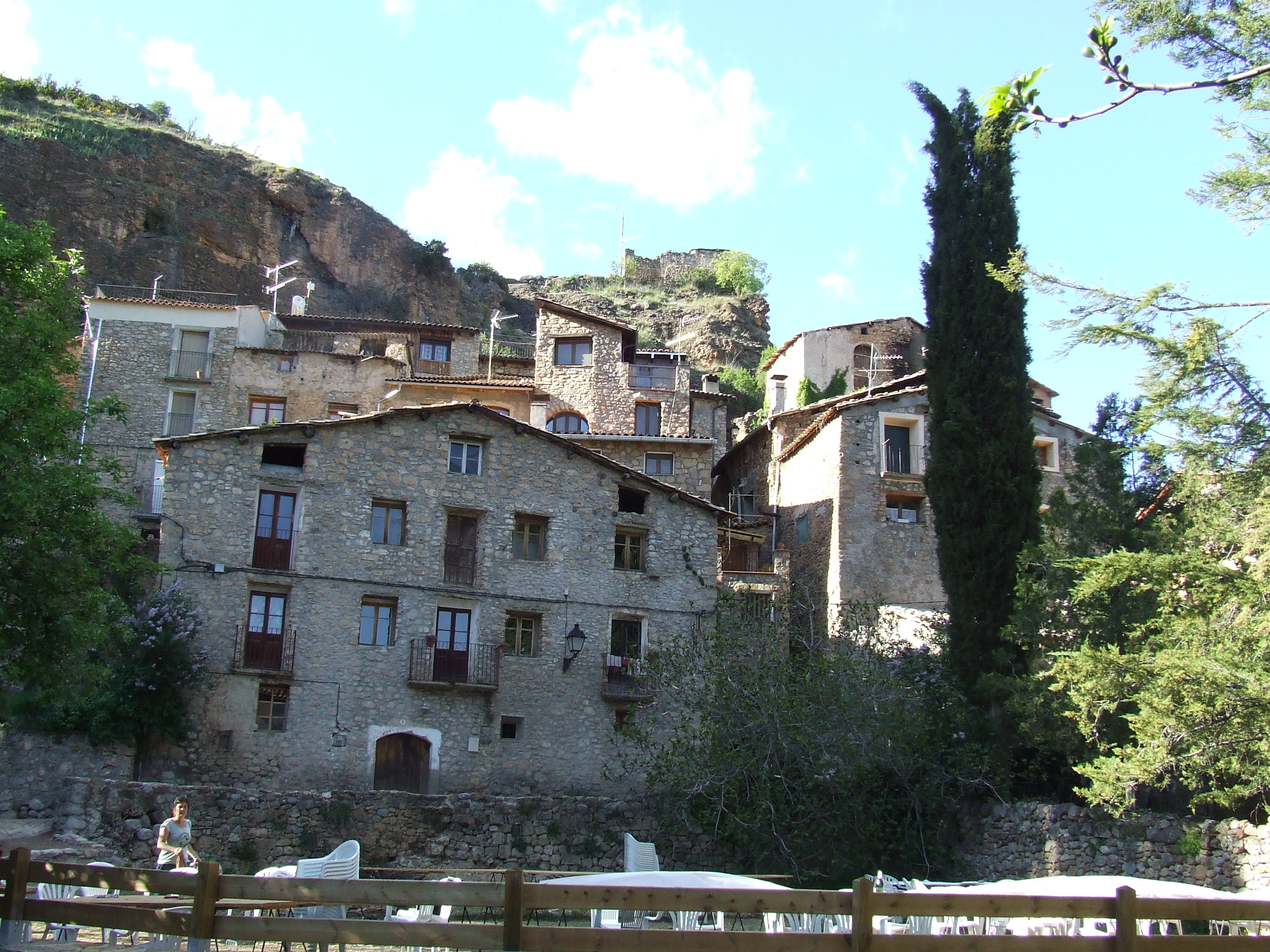

- Location within Province of Lleida Location within Catalonia Location within Spain
- Coordinates: 42°14′59″N 0°53′46″E
- Country: Spain
- Community: Catalonia
- Province: Lleida
- Municipality: Conca de Dalt
- Elevation: 885 m (2,904 ft)

Population
  - Total: 27

Rivert (Catalan pronunciation: [riˈβɛɾ]) is a locality located in the municipality of Conca de Dalt, in Province of Lleida province, Catalonia, Spain. As of 2020, it has a population of 27.

== Geography ==
Rivert is located 108km north-northeast of Lleida.
