= El Pont de Claverol =

- Locality
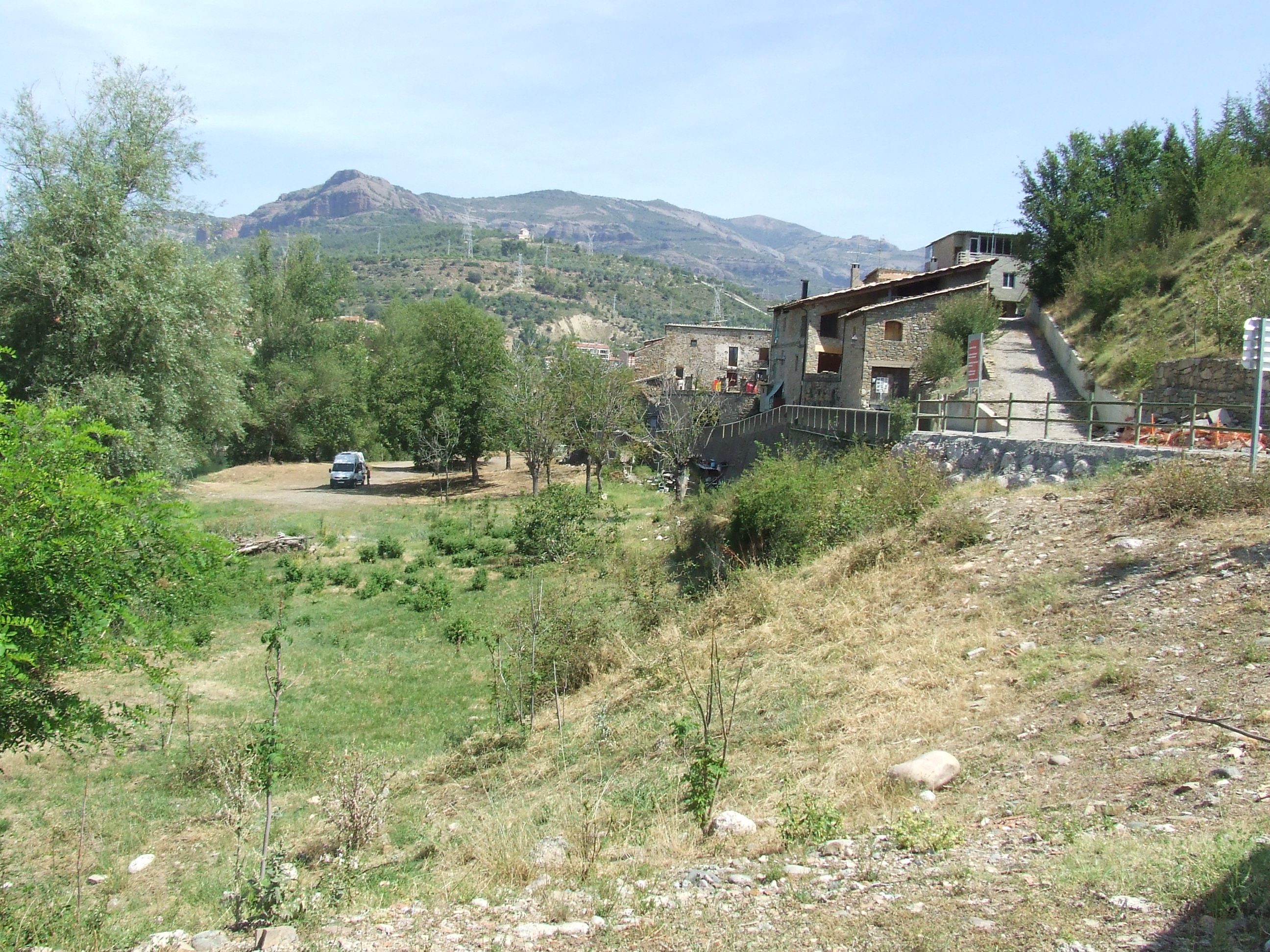

- Location within Province of Lleida Location within Catalonia Location within Spain
- Coordinates: 42°14′35″N 0°58′17″E
- Country: Spain
- Community: Catalonia
- Province: Lleida
- Municipality: Conca de Dalt
- Elevation: 510 m (1,670 ft)

Population
  - Total: 29

El Pont de Claverol (Catalan pronunciation: [el ˈpɔn de klaβeˈɾɔl]) is a hamlet and the capital of the municipality of Conca de Dalt, in Province of Lleida province, Catalonia, Spain. As of 2020, it has a population of 29.

== Geography ==
El Pont de Claverol is located 105km north-northeast of Lleida.
