= Serradell =

- Locality
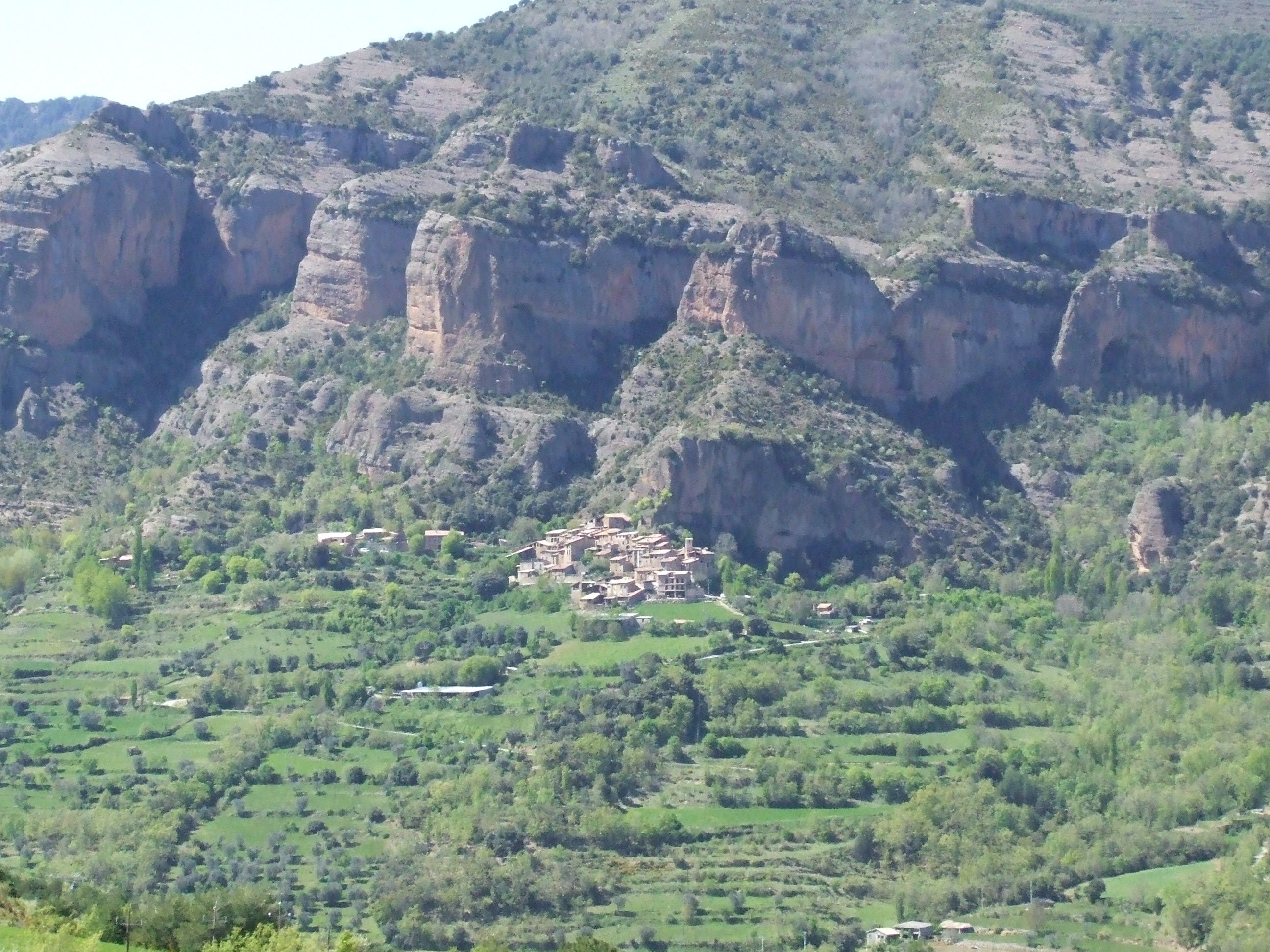

- Location within Province of Lleida Location within Catalonia Location within Spain
- Coordinates: 42°16′31″N 0°54′5″E
- Country: Spain
- Community: Catalonia
- Province: Lleida
- Municipality: Conca de Dalt
- Elevation: 973 m (3,192 ft)

Population
  - Total: 35

Serradell (Catalan pronunciation: [saraˈðeʎ]) is a hamlet located in the municipality of Conca de Dalt, in Province of Lleida province, Catalonia, Spain. As of 2020, it has a population of 35.

== Geography ==
Serradell is located 114km north-northeast of Lleida.
