= Toralla =

- Locality
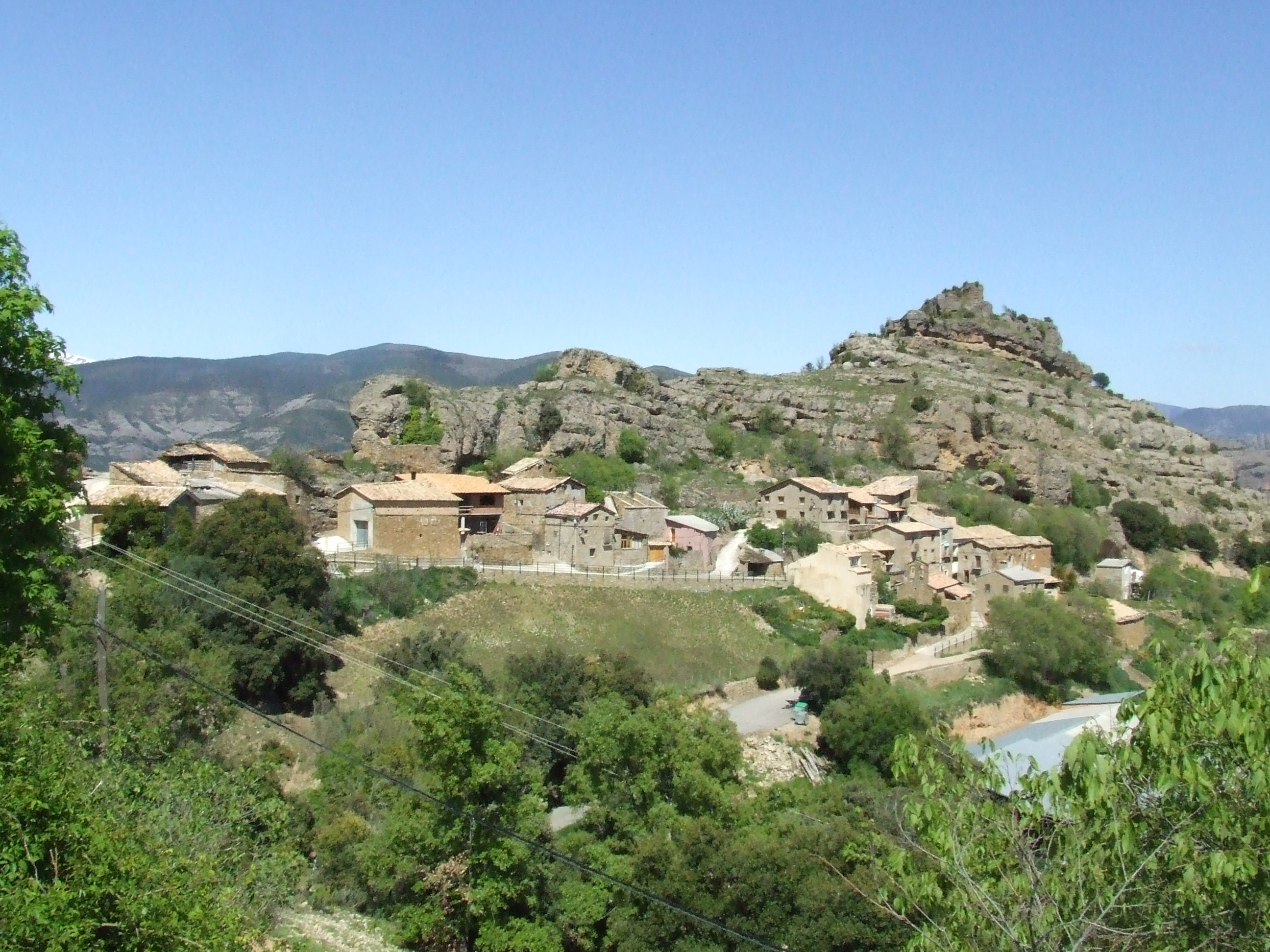

- Location within Province of Lleida Location within Catalonia Location within Spain
- Coordinates: 42°15′51″N 0°55′14″E
- Country: Spain
- Community: Catalonia
- Province: Lleida
- Municipality: Conca de Dalt
- Elevation: 935 m (3,068 ft)

Population
  - Total: 22

Toralla (Catalan pronunciation: [toˈɾaʎa]) is a hamlet located in the municipality of Conca de Dalt, in Province of Lleida province, Catalonia, Spain. As of 2020, it has a population of 22.

== Geography ==
Toralla is located 111km north-northeast of Lleida.
