= Artau II of Pallars Sobirà =

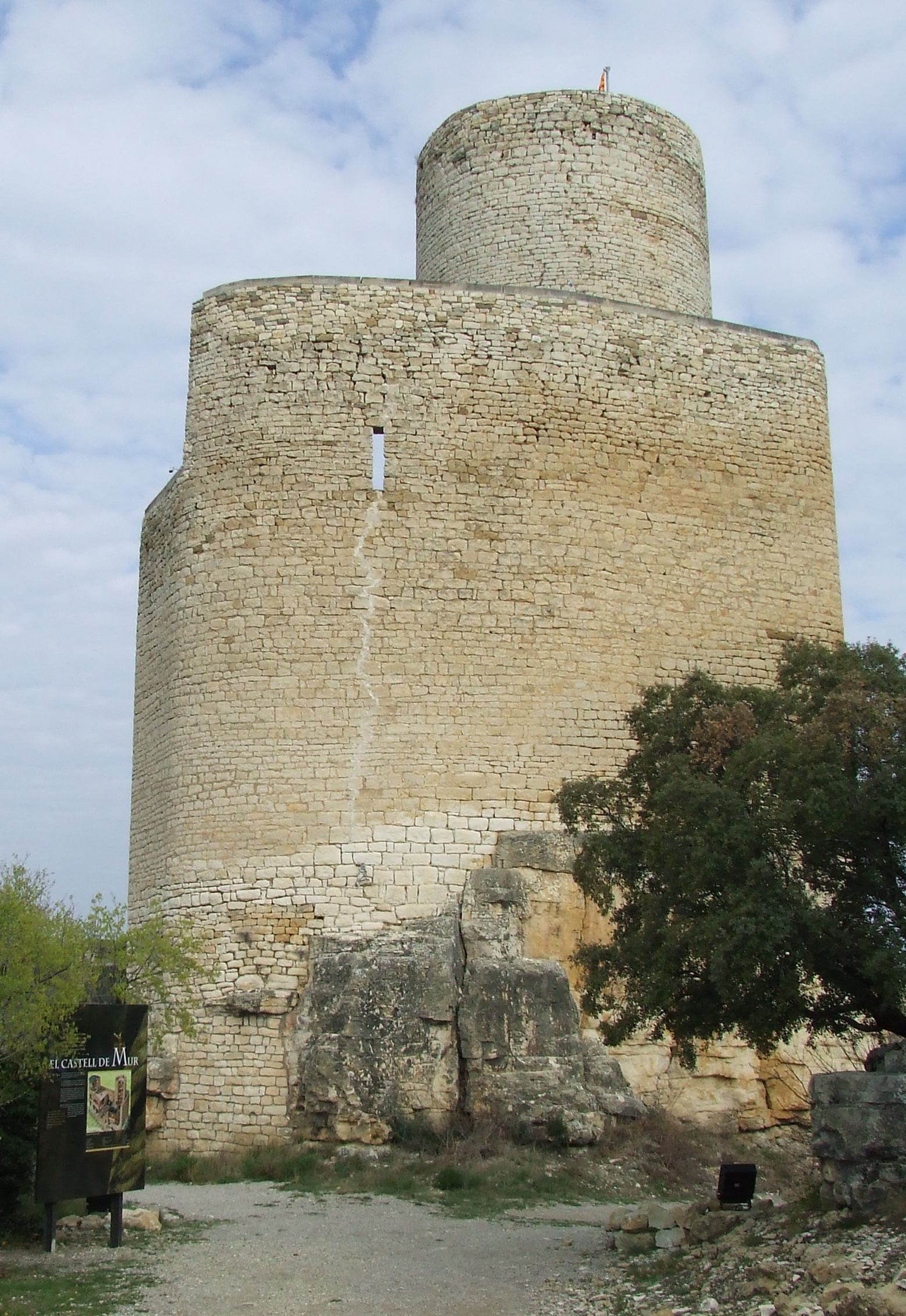
Castle of Mur

Artau II (Latin: Artallus or Artaldus, Spanish: Artallo or Artaldo), the Count of Pallars Sobirà from 1081 until his death c.1115, was active in the Reconquista and sometimes referred to himself as comes et marchio (count and margrave), because he governed a frontier district. He was the son and successor of Artau I.

There is a surviving convention between Artau II and his cousin Raymond IV of Pallars Jussà concerning the castles of Llimiana and Mur, which Raymond commended to Artau. The castellans (seniores) were to be vassals of Artau, with Raymond having the right to fill a vacancy. Artau is known to have given the castle of Cuberes to his vassal Mir Arnau, who in turn gave it to the monastery of Santa Maria de Gerri, to which it had been given on an earlier occasion by Artau's father.

According to a now-lost charter, Artau and Raymond Berengar III of Barcelona reached an agreement (convenientia) concerning the division of lands after the projected capture of Tortosa (which in any event did not come in their lifetimes). This alliance, by which Artau would have been invested with the castle of Tortosa, was concocted towards 1100 and is one of the first instances of the young Raymond Berengar III (he was not even twenty) pursuing a policy of Reconquista against the Muslims to his south.
