= Sant Pere de les Maleses =

Cave monastery in La Pobla de Segur, Spain

Coordinates: 42°16′53″N 1°1′33″E

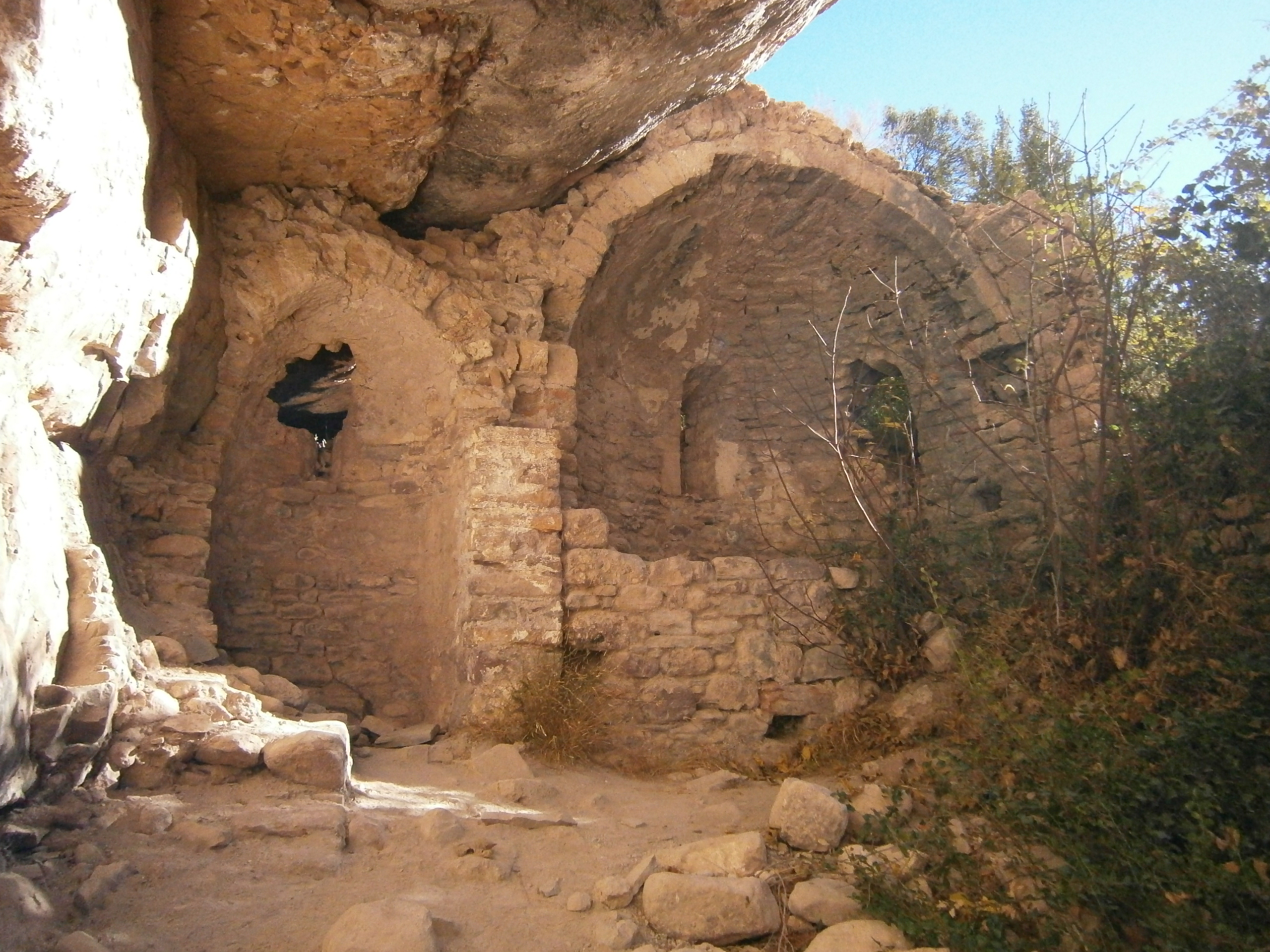
Sant Pere de les Maleses

Sant Pere de les Maleses is a Benedictine cave monastery in the municipality of La Pobla de Segur, Pallars Jussà, in the Province of Lleida, Catalonia, Spain. the monastery was first mentioned in 868 when it was dedicated to St. Andrew and was donated to St. Vincent of Oveix, the abbot of Attila. During the tenth or eleventh century it ceased to be owned by Oveix and was rededicated to St. Peter. It later fell under ownership of Santa Maria de Gerri, and lost its status as a monastery. It was secularized in 1592 and from then on became a simple church.
