= Conca de Dalt =

- Municipality
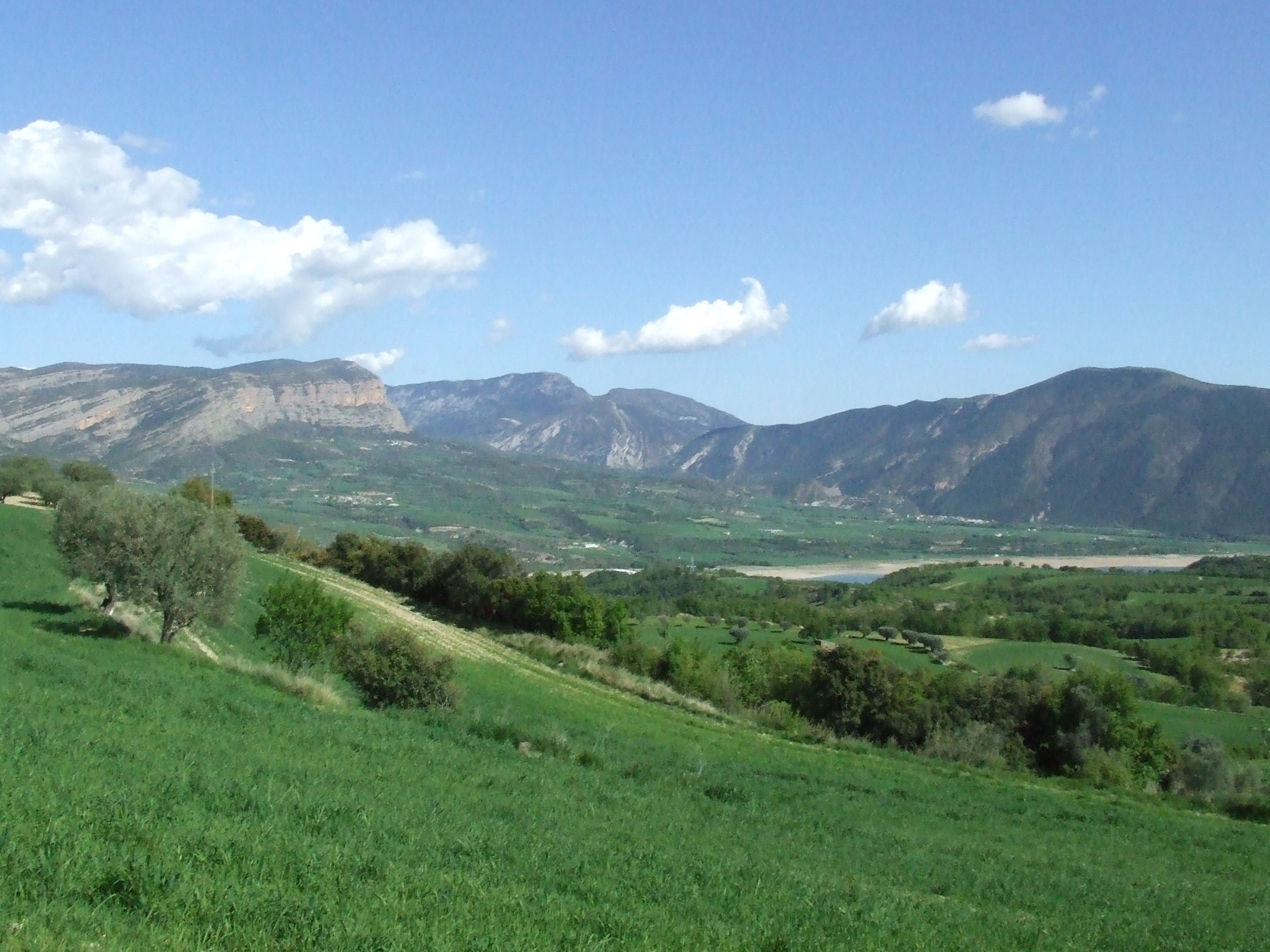
- Conca de dalt

- Location in Catalonia
- Coordinates: 42°14′46″N 0°58′23″E
- Country: Spain
- Community: Catalonia
- Province: Lleida
- Comarca: Pallars Jussà

Government
  - Mayor: Martí Cardona Rocafort (2015)

Area
  - Total: 166.5 km^{2} (64.3 sq mi)
- Elevation: 507 m (1,663 ft)

Population (2025-01-01)
  - Total: 438
  - Density: 2.63/km^{2} (6.81/sq mi)
- Website: www.concadalt.cat

Conca de Dalt (Catalan pronunciation: [ˈkoŋka ðe ˈðal]) is a municipality (municipi) in the comarca of the Pallars Jussà in Catalonia, Spain. The municipal territory extends to both the east and west of la Pobla de Segur, on the sides of the valley of the Noguera Pallaresa river. The municipality was known as Pallars Jussà from its formation in 1969 (by the fusion of twelve smaller municipalities) until 1995, when the name was changed to avoid confusion with the comarca.

It has a population of 438 (register office, 2025).

== Subdivisions ==
The municipality of Conca de Dalt is composed of twelve settlements: populations are given as of 2005.

- Aramunt (103)
- Claverol (26)
- Erinyà (29), near the gorge formed by the Flamicell river through the Sant Gervàs range
- Hortoneda (45)
- Pessonada (50)
- El Pont de Claverol (11), seat of the ajuntament (town hall), to the west of la Pobla de Segur
- Rivert (37)
- Sant Martí de Canals (51)
- Serradell (16)
- Sossís (32), with a coal mine and hydroelectric power station
- Toralla (23)
- Torallola (16)

== Demography ==
1900	1930	1950	1970	1986	2007
2014	1789	1289	665	481	434
