= Isarn, Count of Pallars =

Isarn (Note: Or Ysarn; his name appears in contemporary Latin sources as Ysarnus and Aznarius, Isarn being a variant of Aznar.) (died 948) was the Count of Pallars from 920 until his death, and effectively a sovereign prince. He was the eldest of the four sons of Raymond I, Count of Pallars and Ribagorza. With his younger brother Lope he co-ruled Pallars after his father's death in 920. Their brothers Bernard I of Ribagorza and Miró co-governed Ribagorza. A fifth brother, Otto (or Ato), was Bishop of Pallars, which allowed the counts, especially Isarn, to effectively control the Church in their territories.

Isarn probably co-governed Pallars with his father from around 900. In 904 he was captured along with seven hundred others during a raid by the Qasawi Muslim lord of Lleida, Llop ibn Muhammad. From the Códice de Roda we know that he remained a prisoner at Tudela until 918, when he was liberated by his cousin, King Sancho I of Pamplona. (Note: The Codex states that Isarn was captive in Tutela (in Tudela) and released by rex Sanzio Garseanis (king Sancho Garcés).) As count, Isarn founded a convent, Sant Pere de Burgal, at Burghals and made his daughter Ermengardis its first abbess in 945. At that date he signed a charter as Domnus Isarnus comes et marchio dum resideret in Paliarensis regno: "Lord Isarn, count and margrave, while residing in the kingdom of Pallars." Isarn also had a son named William who succeeded him but died without descendants.
