= Sunyer I of Pallars =

Count Suñer I (also Sunyer, Suniario; died in 1010) was sovereign Count of Pallars from 948 until his death. He was also the Count of Ribagorza de iure uxoris ("by his marriage").

== Biography ==
Count Suñer was a son of the Count Lope I of Pallars and his spouse, Goltregoda of Cerdanya.

He was thus a younger brother of the Count Borrell I of Pallars and the Count Raymond II of Pallars.

Suñer succeeded his father and his uncle, Isarn, Count of Pallars. Suñer ruled together with his brothers, who died in 995.

From 995 until his death, Suñer ruled Pallars together with his paternal nephew, Ermengol I of Pallars (the son of Borrell I).

== Marriages and children ==
Suñer was first married to Ermengarda/Ermentruda, his sister-in-law (the former wife of Borrell). Suñer and his sister-in-law were the parents of two sons – Raymond III of Pallars Jussà and William II of Pallars Sobirà – and a daughter, Ermengarda.

Sunyer's second wife was Countess Toda of Ribagorza, daughter of his cousin Raymond II, Count of Ribagorza.
