= Raymond III of Pallars Jussà =

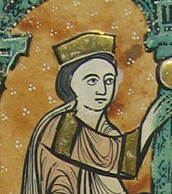
Raymond III of Pallars Jussà

Raymond III (died 1047), called Ramon Sunyer (Spanish: Ramón Súñer), was the first Count of Pallars Jussà (Lower Pallars) from 1011 until his death. He succeeded his father, Count Sunyer I of Pallars, who divided his county between his two sons. Raymond, the elder, received Pallars Jussà and William II, the younger, received Pallars Sobirà. Raymond's mother, Ermentrude, was Sunyer's first wife.

As early as 1006, Raymond appears as co-count with his father, but while his father was styled "count by the grace of God", Raymond was merely styled "count". His brother William was not titled count at this time.

In 1040 Raymond signed a convention (convenientia) with Count Ermengol III of Urgell. He agreed to recognise Ermengol as his lord and in return receive an annual subsidy from the count. This was the first charter following the convenientia formula in Pallars Jussà. The scribe was a priest named Vidal who had a long career with Raymond's son, Raymond IV, and the latter's father-in-law, Lord Arnau Mir de Tost. In the same convention, Ermengol quitclaimed the castle of Llimiana (Liminina) to Raymond to put an end to "all the quarrels he had with him" (omnes querelas quas habebat de eum).

When Raymond IV, who succeeded his father, compelled his subjects to swear a collective public oath, he made reference to Raymond III and William II of Pallars Sobirà. On this basis, Pierre Bonnassie argued that the public oath probably originated at least under Raymond III and his brother and that Raymond IV was borrowing their formula. This would be an important piece of evidence that countship in Pallars still reflected the Carolingian model of public office rather than a model of private landowning.

== Marriages and children ==
Raymond's first wife was Mayor, a daughter (probably the youngest) of Count García Fernández of Castile and Countess Ava of Ribagorza. The first record of their marriage dates to 3 August 1016, but by then they had been married for several years (since 1008/10). Ava's sister Tota was Count Sunyer's second wife and Raymond was thus married to the niece of his step-mother, perhaps through her arrangement. Sometime after January 1027, Raymond repudiated his wife. In 1028 Mayor was governing the monastery of San Miguel del Pedroso in Castile. She was still alive in 1034.

By 1029 Raymond had taken a second wife, Ermessinda. All that is known for certain of her origins is her mother's name, Gilga or Guisla. She may have been a daughter of Count Ermengol I of Urgell, whose second wife was Guisla (flourished 1005–10). Ermessinda was the mother of Raymond's sons, Raymond IV and Sunyer II. She may have been the mother of his only known daughter, Ricarda, who by 1044 was married to García Eizo. Ermessinda outlived her husband and died between 2 August 1055 and 27 October 1069.

== Sources ==
- Kosto, Adam J. (2001). Making Agreements in Medieval Catalonia: Power, Order, and the Written Word, 1000–1200. Cambridge: Cambridge University Press. ISBN 0521792398.
- Martínez Díez, Gonzalo (2007). Sancho III el Mayor: Rey de Pamplona, Rex Ibericus. Madrid: Marcial Pons Historia. ISBN 9788496467477.
- Stasser, Thierry (1996). "Origine familiale de trois comtesses de Pallars". Anuario de Estudios Medievales. 26 (1): 3–18. doi:10.3989/aem.1996.v26.i1.685.
