= Pessonada =

- Locality
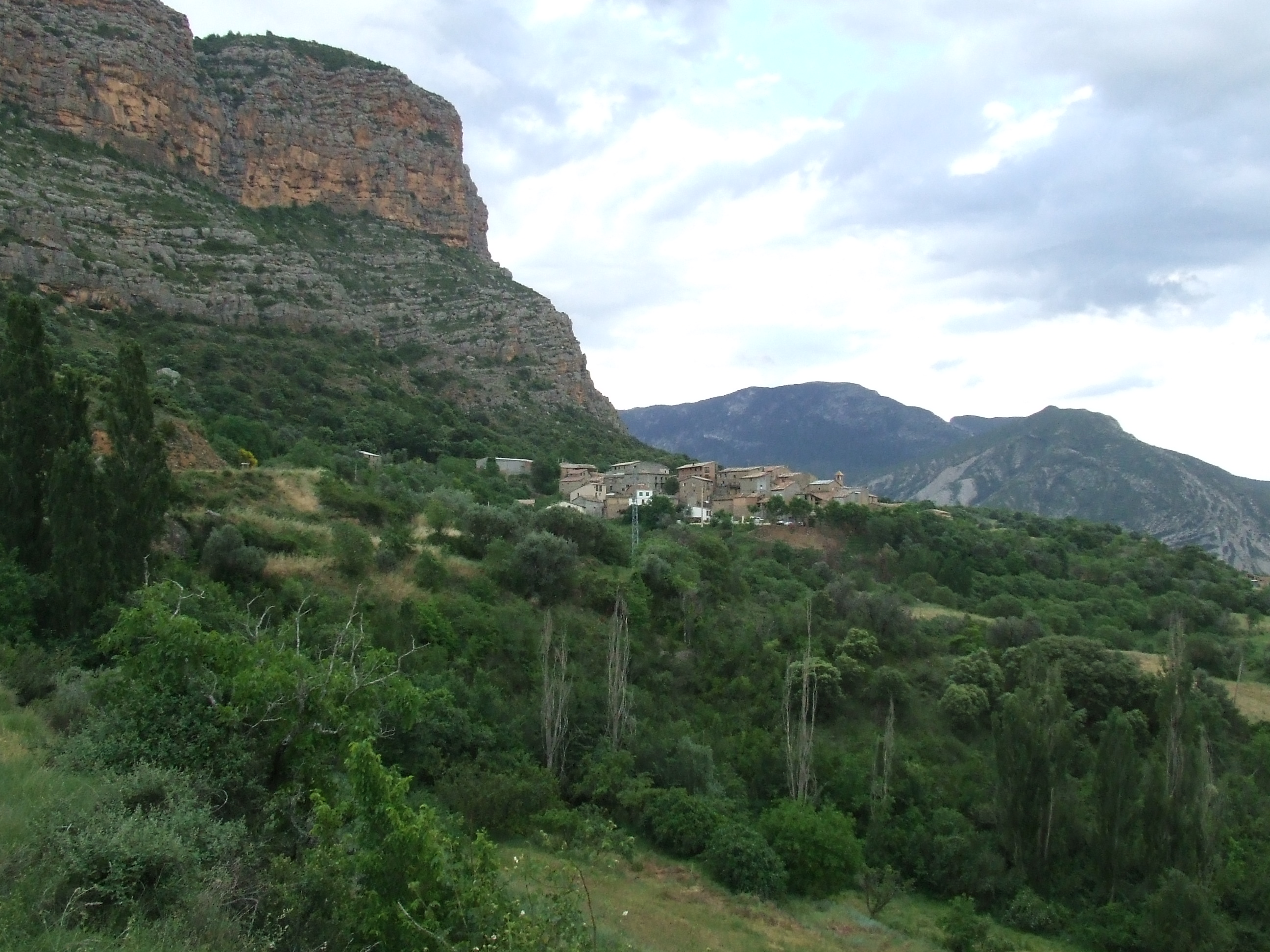

- Location within Province of Lleida Location within Catalonia Location within Spain
- Coordinates: 42°12′52″N 1°1′15″E
- Country: Spain
- Community: Catalonia
- Province: Lleida
- Municipality: Conca de Dalt
- Elevation: 889 m (2,917 ft)

Population
  - Total: 40

Pessonada (Catalan pronunciation: [pesoˈnaða]) is a village located in the municipality of Conca de Dalt, in Province of Lleida province, Catalonia, Spain. As of 2020, it has a population of 40.

== Geography ==
Pessonada is located 113km north-northeast of Lleida.
