= Claverol =

- Locality
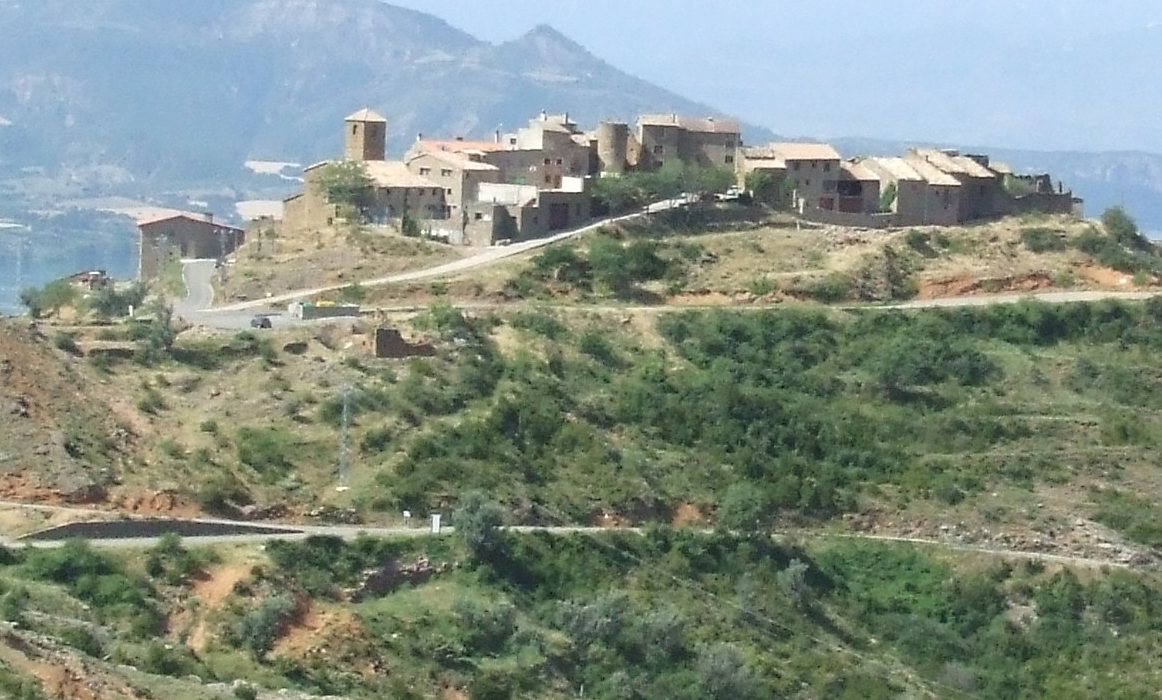

- Location within Province of Lleida Location within Catalonia Location within Spain
- Coordinates: 42°14′41″N 0°59′12″E
- Country: Spain
- Community: Catalonia
- Province: Lleida
- Municipality: Conca de Dalt
- Elevation: 746 m (2,448 ft)

Population
  - Total: 26

Claverol (Catalan pronunciation: [klaβeˈɾɔl]) is a hamlet located in the municipality of Conca de Dalt, in Province of Lleida province, Catalonia, Spain. As of 2020, it has a population of 26.

== Geography ==
Claverol is located 109km north-northeast of Lleida.
