= Casbas Monastery =

Monastery in Huesca, Aragon, Spain

Coordinates: 42.1564°N 0.1400°W

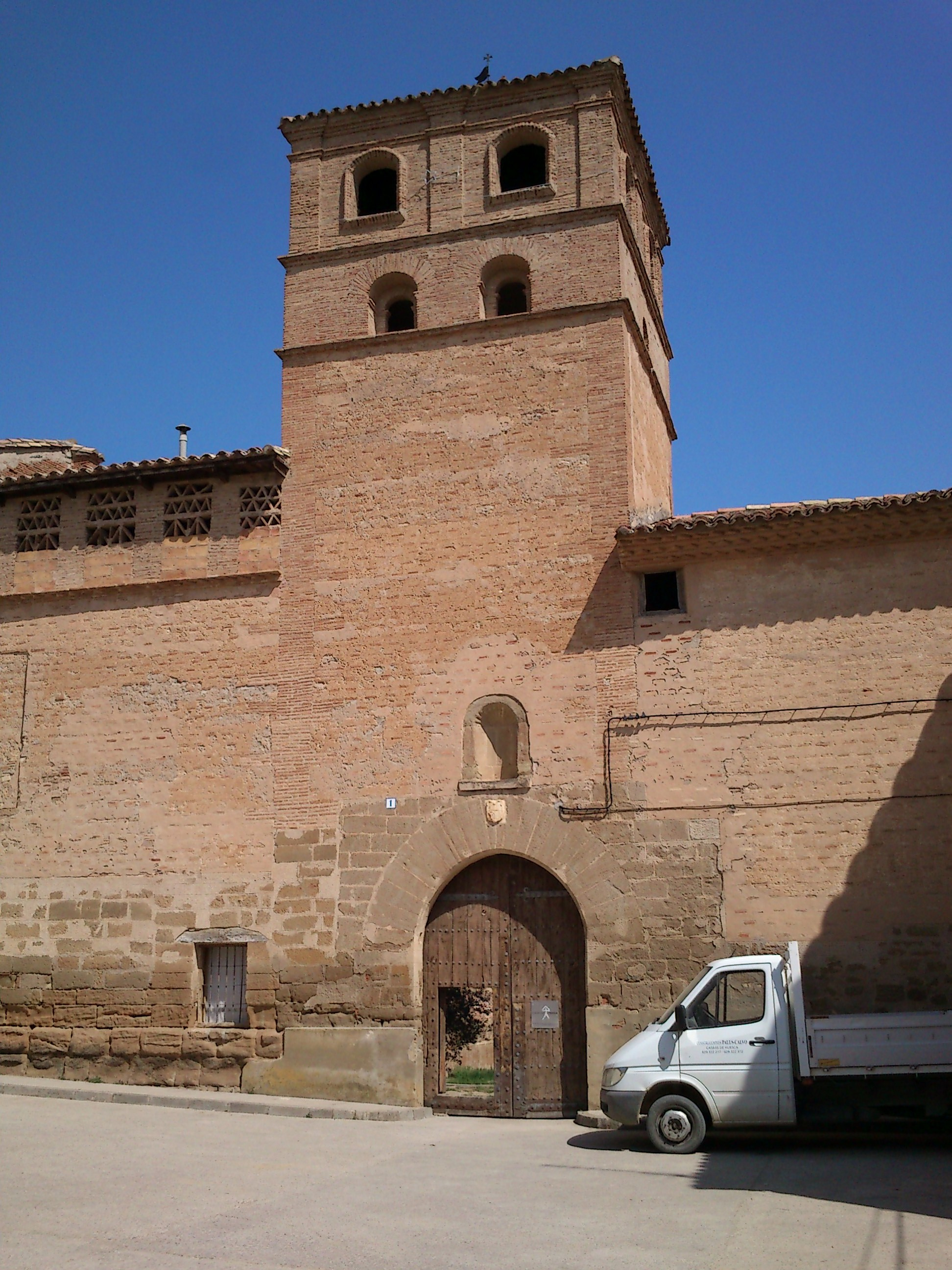
Entrance

The Casbas Monastery, also known as the Monastery of Santa Maria de la Gloria, is in Casbas de Huesca, a municipality in the province of Huesca, Aragon, Spain. A Bien de Interés Cultural (National Monument), it was established in 1173 by Countess Oria de Pallars (or Aurea) with the support of her husband Arnau Mir, Count of Pallars Jussà, between 1124 and 1174, and the Bishop of Huesca, Esteve de Sant Martí. Bishop Esteve had previously been the abbot of the Cistercian Monastery of Poblet from 1160 until 1165. The first abbess was Isabel, who ruled over the 30 noblewomen who entered the community until 1182. The abbess of Casbas had civil and criminal jurisdiction over her lands beginning in 1178. The Benedictine community of women formally came under the auspices of the Cistercian order in 1196, recognized as such by Pope Celestine III.

== Architecture ==
The Church of Santa Maria de la Gloria was consecrated in 1208. The church was built in a late Romanesque style with a barrel vault over the nave. The Latin cross plan ends in an extended apse with two side chapels. It has an octagonal cupula over the crossing. The cupula was likely constructed under the patronage of abbess Jerónima de Azlor (1609-1615).

The Romanesque portal of the church (c. 1200), off of the south transept, has a Chrismon on the tympanum with 11 archivolts extending from it. The cloister with its ogee arches dates from the 14th or 15th century. The chapterhouse includes two floor tomb relief slabs from the 14th century.

It was likely intended to be the familial pantheon for the Pallars-Jussá. In 2004 the monastery was transferred to private hands. It had only had two periods of closure prior to that, during the revolution of 1868 and during the Spanish Civil War in 1936. A surviving altarpiece of Saint Ursula (c. 1300) can be visited at the Museu Nacional d'Art de Catalunya (cat. number 004377-000).
