= Santa Maria de Lavaix =

Benedictine monastery in Pantà d' Escales, Spain

Coordinates: 42°23′18″N 0°44′52″E

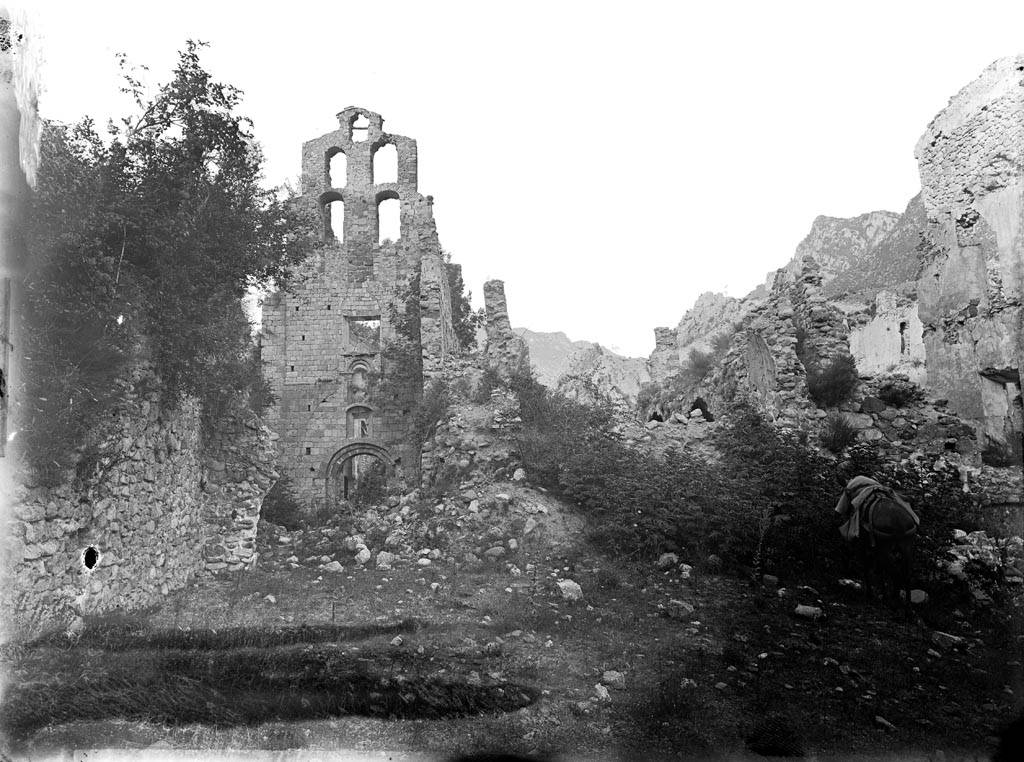
Ruins of the monastery (1888)

Santa Maria de Lavaix was a Romanesque Benedictine monastery in Pantà d'Escales in the municipality of El Pont de Suert, Alta Ribagorça, Catalonia, Spain. It was first mentioned in the 10th century. In the 13th century it fell under the Barony of Erill and in 1223 it became a Cistercians’ abbey. By the beginning of the 19th century, it had declined and was finally shut down during the Ecclesiastical Confiscations of Mendizábal in 1835. Upon the construction of the Escales Dam in June 1955, the old monastery was flooded and little remains other than the walls and traces of the northeast angle of the nave.
