= Casbas de Huesca =

Coordinates: 42°09′N 0°08′W

Casbas de Huesca Casbas de Uesca, Casbas d'as Monchas
- municipality
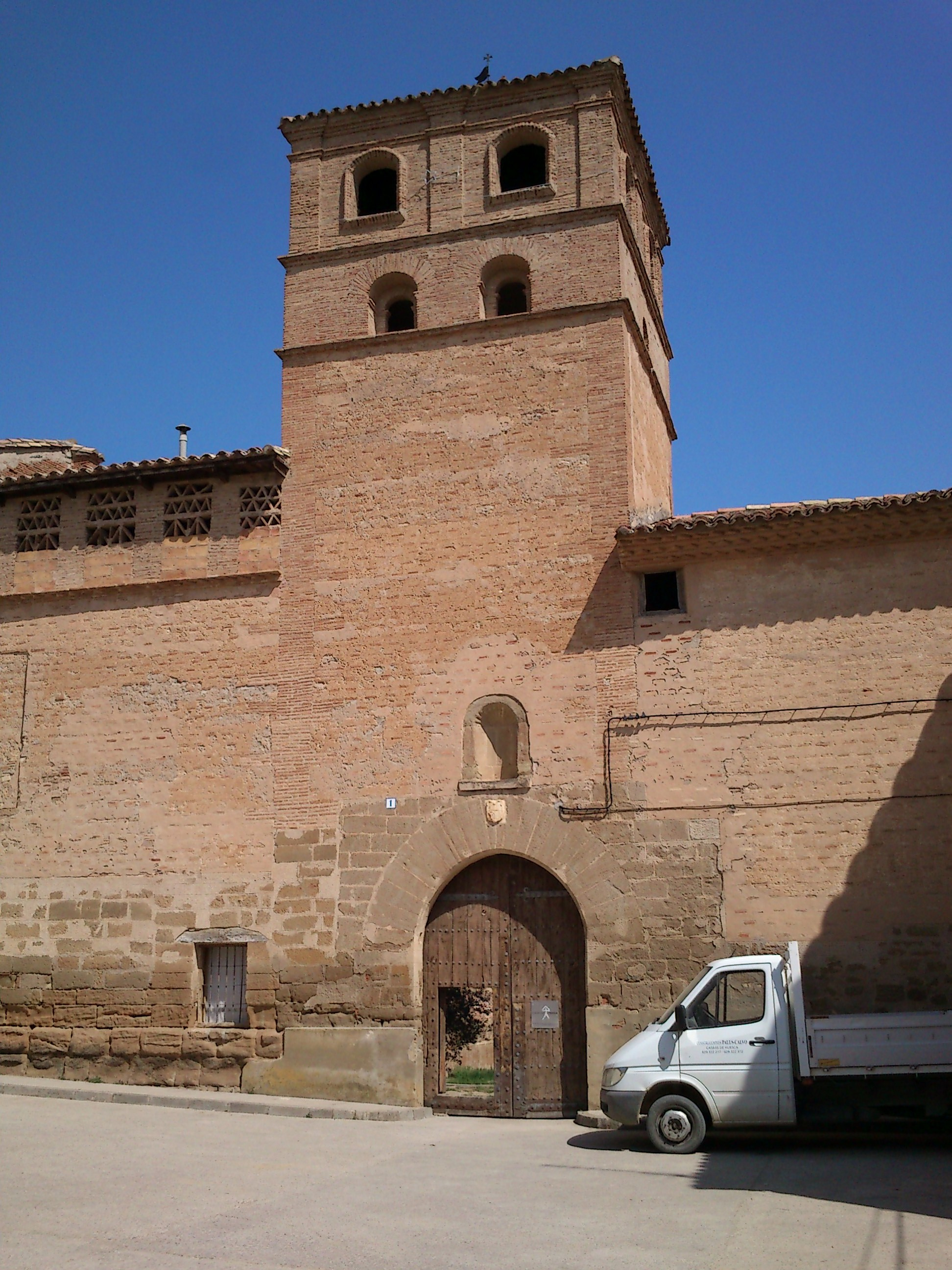
- Casbas de Huesca.JPG Monastery

- Flag Coat of arms
- Interactive map of Casbas de Huesca
- Country: Spain
- Autonomous community: Aragon
- Province: Huesca

Area
  - Total: 132 km^{2} (51 sq mi)
- Elevation: 560 m (1,840 ft)

Population (2025-01-01)
  - Total: 287
  - Density: 2.17/km^{2} (5.63/sq mi)
- Time zone: UTC+1 (CET)
  - Summer (DST): UTC+2 (CEST)

Casbas de Huesca (Aragonese Casbas de Uesca or Casbas d'as Monchas) is a municipality located in the province of Huesca, Aragon, Spain. According to the 2004 census (INE), the municipality has a population of 296 inhabitants.

It comprises six villages: Casbas de Huesca itself, as well as Junzano, Labata, Panzano, Santa Cilia de Panzano and Sieso de Huesca. It includes the Romanesque Casbas Monastery, which ruled the area in the Middle Ages.

== See also ==
- List of municipalities in Huesca
