= Santa Maria de Gerri =

Monastery in Gerri de la Sal, Catalonia, Spain

Coordinates: 42°19′12.32″N 1°4′8.09″E

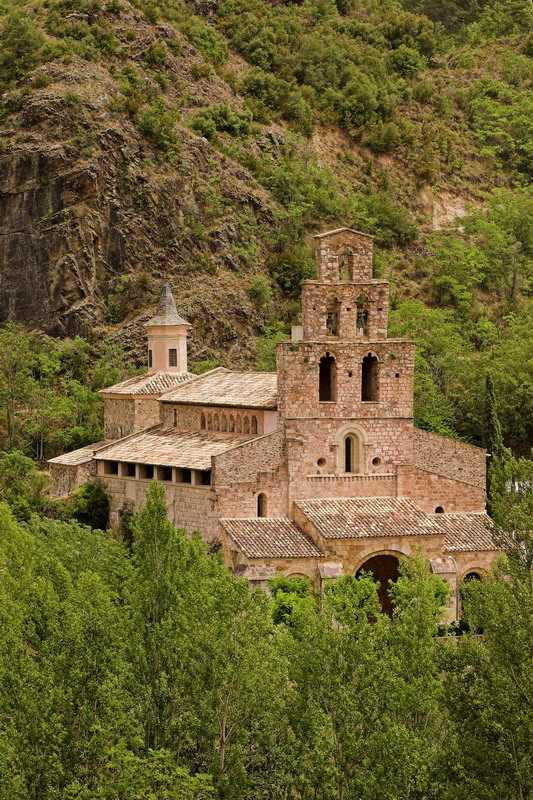
Santa Maria de Gerri.

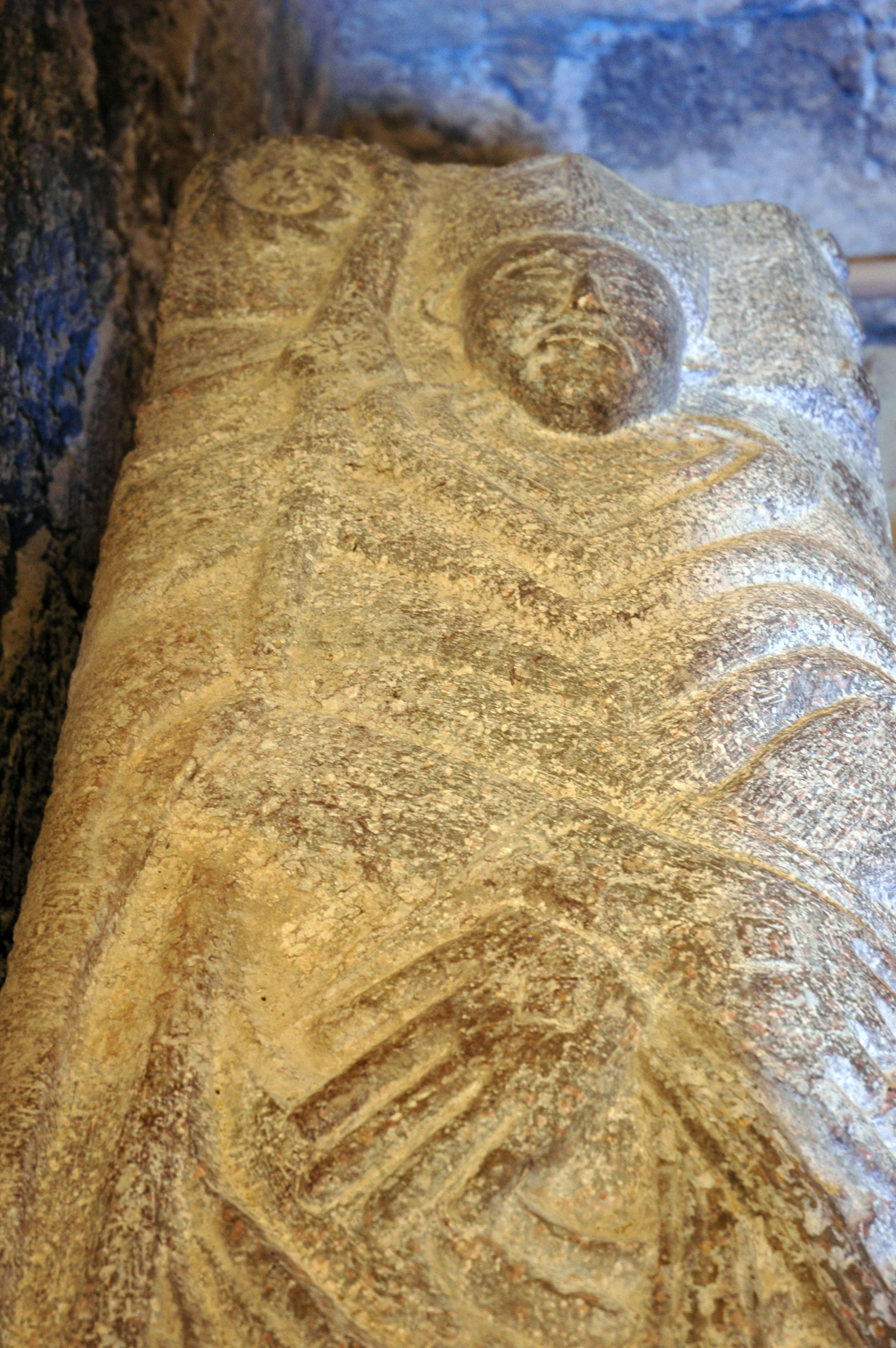
Tomb of bishop Ot de Urgell.

Santa Maria de Gerri is a monastery in Gerri de la Sal, in the comarca of Pallars Sobirà, Catalonia, Spain, situated on the shores of the Noguera Pallaresa river.

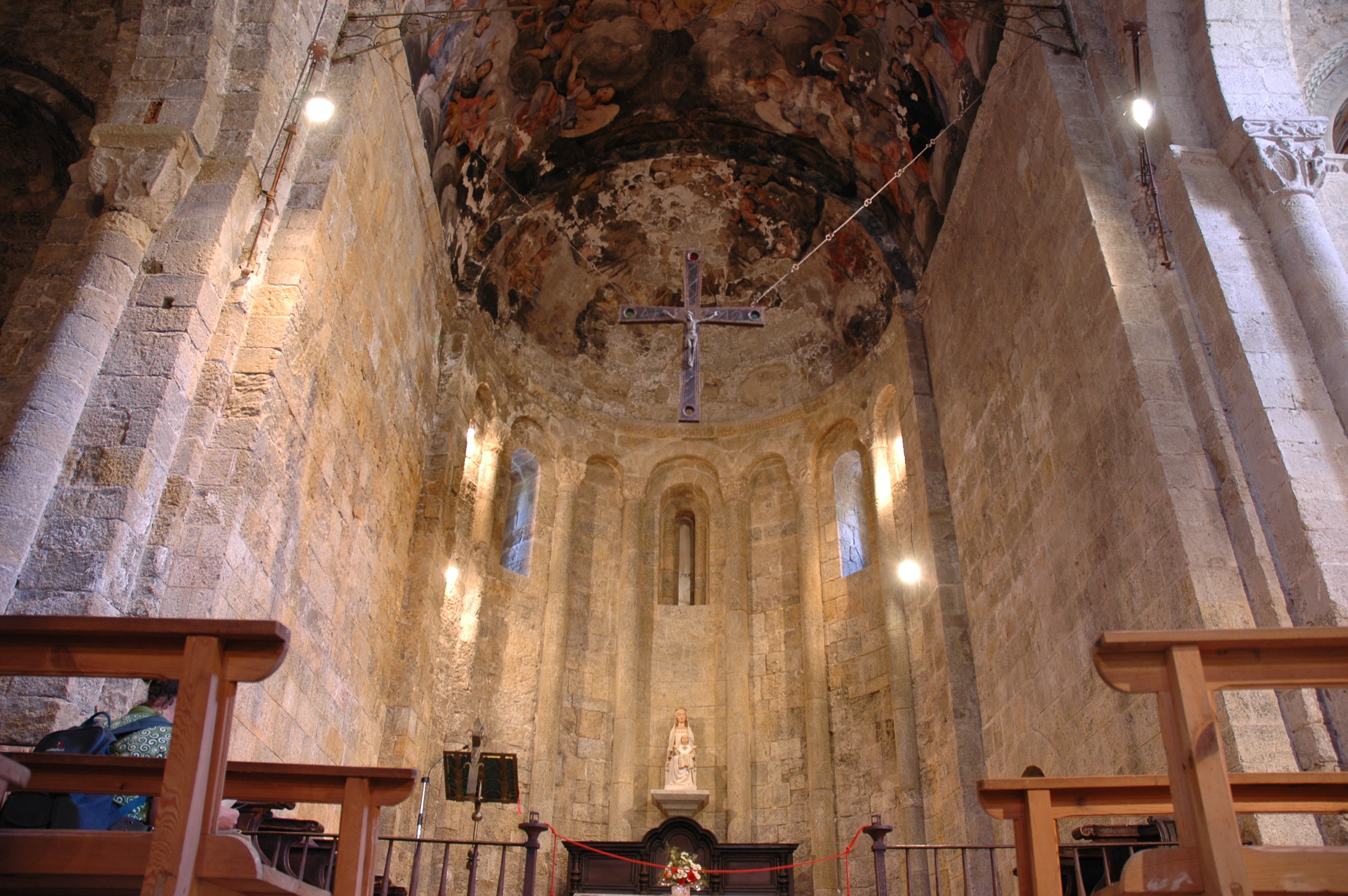
View of the apse.

== History ==
The monastery was founded in 807, and its community adhered to the Benedictine rule in 839. Located in the diocese of Urgell, the monastery contributed to the evangelization of the territory, which had been recently conquered by the Christians from the Moors. In 996 the monastery was put under the director protection the Popes, and depended from the Abbey of St. Victor of Marseille.

In 1190 all the monastery's possession went under the protection of King Alfonso II of Aragon, and, thanks to numerous donations in the 12th-14th centuries, including the cave monastery of Sant Pere de les Maleses, it became the richest foundation in the county of Urgell. Later it decayed, until, in 1835, it was secularized.

== Architecture ==
Of the 9th century structure, today only ruins remain. The Romanesque church, built in the 12th century, has a nave and two aisles, without transept, and with three semi-circular apses. The latter are preceded by a presbytery located at level far lower than the rest of the church.

The nave is covered by barrel vaults. The central apse is decorated by seven blind arcades, supported by pilasters with sculpted capitals, similar to those in the Sant Pere de Galligants monastery. The same decorations, including vegetable motifs, fantastic animals, angels and biblical characters, characterizes the capitals of the church's interior.

The main façade is surmounted by a sail-shaped bell tower with three floors.
