= Ermengol =

Ermengol in Catalan, Armengol or Armengod in Spanish, Ermengaud in French, Ermengau in Occitan, and Hermengaudius in Latin is a Germanic given name of Gothic origin meaning "ready for battle". The name was Arabised during the Middle Ages as أرمقند, Armaqand.

- Ermengol of Rouergue, count
- Ermengol of Osona, count
- Ermengol of Pallars, count
- Saint Ermengol, bishop of Urgell
- Ermengaud (archbishop of Narbonne)
- Ermengol I, count of Urgell
- Ermengol II, count of Urgell
- Ermengol III, count of Urgell
- Ermengol IV, count of Urgell
- Ermengol V, count of Urgell
- Ermengol VI, count of Urgell
- Ermengol VII, count of Urgell
- Ermengol VIII, count of Urgell
- Ermengol IX, count of Urgell
- Ermengol X, count of Urgell
- Ermengol (abbot of Sant Cugat)
- Armengol de Aspa, Grand Master of the Knights Hospitaller
- Ermengaud de Béziers, writer
- Ermengaud de Saint-Gilles, writer
- Armengaud Blaise (died 1312), a physician, translator and an author

It also appears as a surname in the later Middle Ages:

- Bernat Ermengol, inquisitor
- Matfre Ermengau, troubadour
- Peire Ermengau, troubadour
- Pedro Armengol, saint
- Joan Armengol (bishop), bishop of Barcelona
