= Ermengol, Count of Urgell =

Ermengol, Count of Urgell may refer to:

- Ermengol I
- Ermengol II
- Ermengol III
- Ermengol IV
- Ermengol V
- Ermengol VI
- Ermengol VII
- Ermengol VIII
- Ermengol IX
- Ermengol X
