= Ecclesiastical confiscations of Mendizábal =

Decrees set in Spain from 1835 to 1837

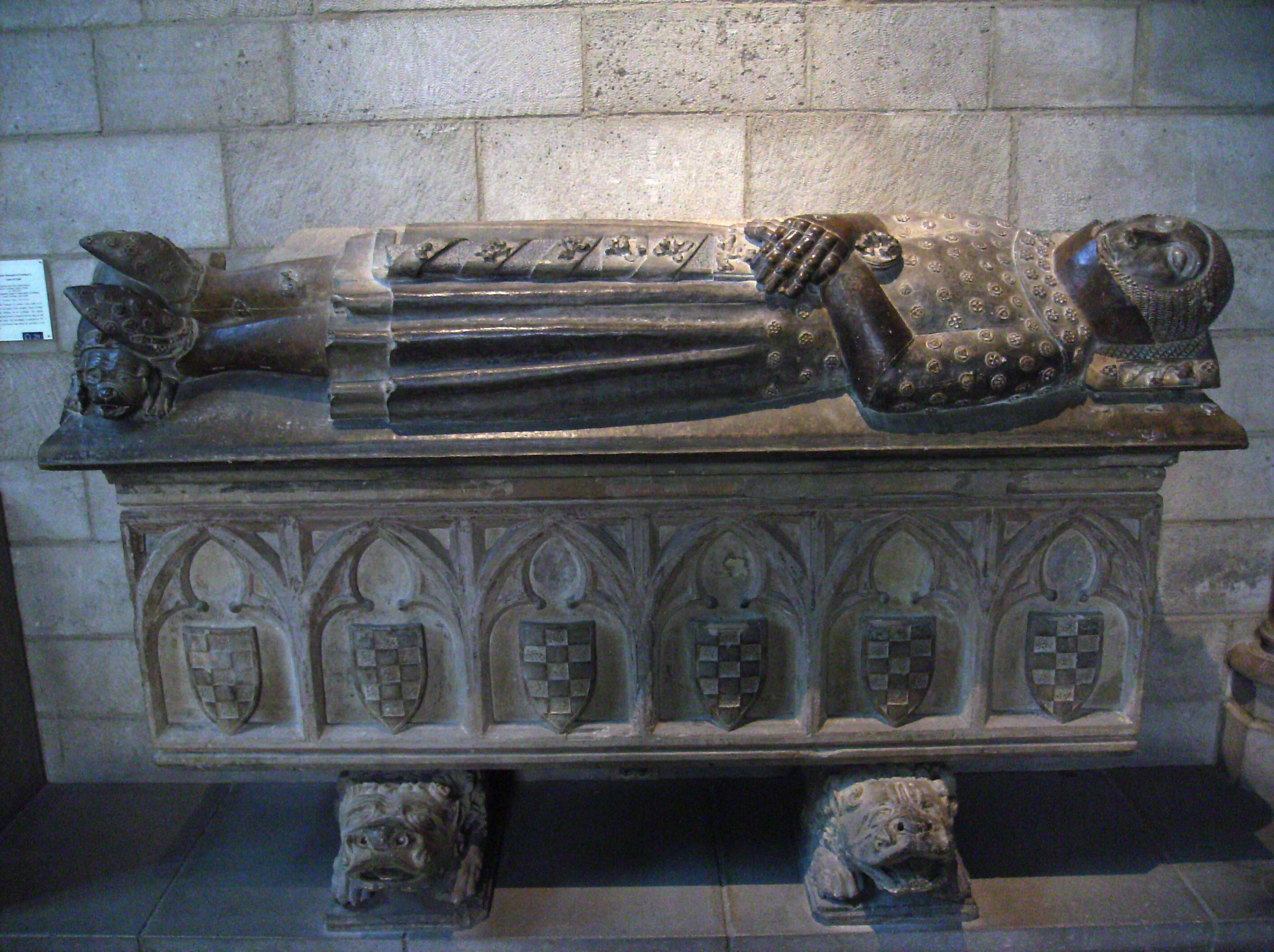
The sepulchre of Ermengol X (1274–1314), Count of Urgell and Viscount of Àger, sold in the 19th century and now The Cloisters, New York City, as a result of the Ecclesiastical Confiscations of Mendizábal

The ecclesiastical confiscations of Mendizábal (Spanish: desamortización eclesiástica de Mendizábal), more often referred to simply as la Desamortización in Spanish, were a set of decrees which resulted in the expropriation and privatisation of monastic properties in Spain from 1835 to 1837.

The legislation was promulgated by Juan Álvarez Mendizábal and came into effect on 19 February 1836. Mendizábal was briefly prime minister under Queen regent Maria Christina, during the reign of the two-year-old Queen Isabel II of Spain.

The aims of the legislation were varied: some of its impulses were fostered by the anticlerical liberal factions engaged in a civil war with Carlist and other reactionary forces, while it was said that the government wished to use confiscated land to encourage the enterprises of the small-land-owning middle class, since much of the land was thought of as underused by monastic orders. The government, which refused to compensate the church for the properties, saw this as a source of income. Ultimately, wealthy noble families took advantage of the legislation to increase their holdings.

Pope Gregory XVI gave an account of events from his perspective in an allocution to Catholic church leaders in Rome on 1 February 1836, lamenting the outcome and explaining his decision to withdraw Luigi Amat di San Filippo e Sorso, titular Archbishop of Nicaea, from his role in Spain as papal representative.

== Aftermath ==
Ultimately, the desamortización led to the vacating of most of the ancient monasteries in Spain, which had been occupied by the various convent orders for centuries. Some of the expropriations were reversed in subsequent decades, as happened at Santo Domingo de Silos, but these re-establishments were relatively few. Some of the secularised monasteries are in a reasonably good state of preservation, for example the Valldemossa Charterhouse; others are ruined, such as San Pedro de Arlanza.

== See also ==
- Anti-clerical riots of 1835
- Spanish confiscation
- Anticlericalism in Spain
- Confiscations of Madoz

== Sources ==
- Josefina Bello, Frailes, Intendentes y Políticos; Los Bienes Nacionales 1835-1850. Santillana, S.A. Taurus, 1997, ISBN 84-306-0032-9
- Joseph Harrison, An economic history of modern Spain, Page 26, Manchester University Press ND, 1978. ISBN 0-7190-0704-6, ISBN 978-0-7190-0704-0
- Francisco Tomás y Valiente, El marco político de la desamortización en España. Ariel 1989 ISBN 84-344-0704-3
- Germán Rueda Hernánz, La desamortización en España: un balance, 1766–1924, Arco Libros. 1997. ISBN 978-84-7635-270-0.
