= Spanish confiscation =

Government seizure from the Catholic Church (1798–1924)

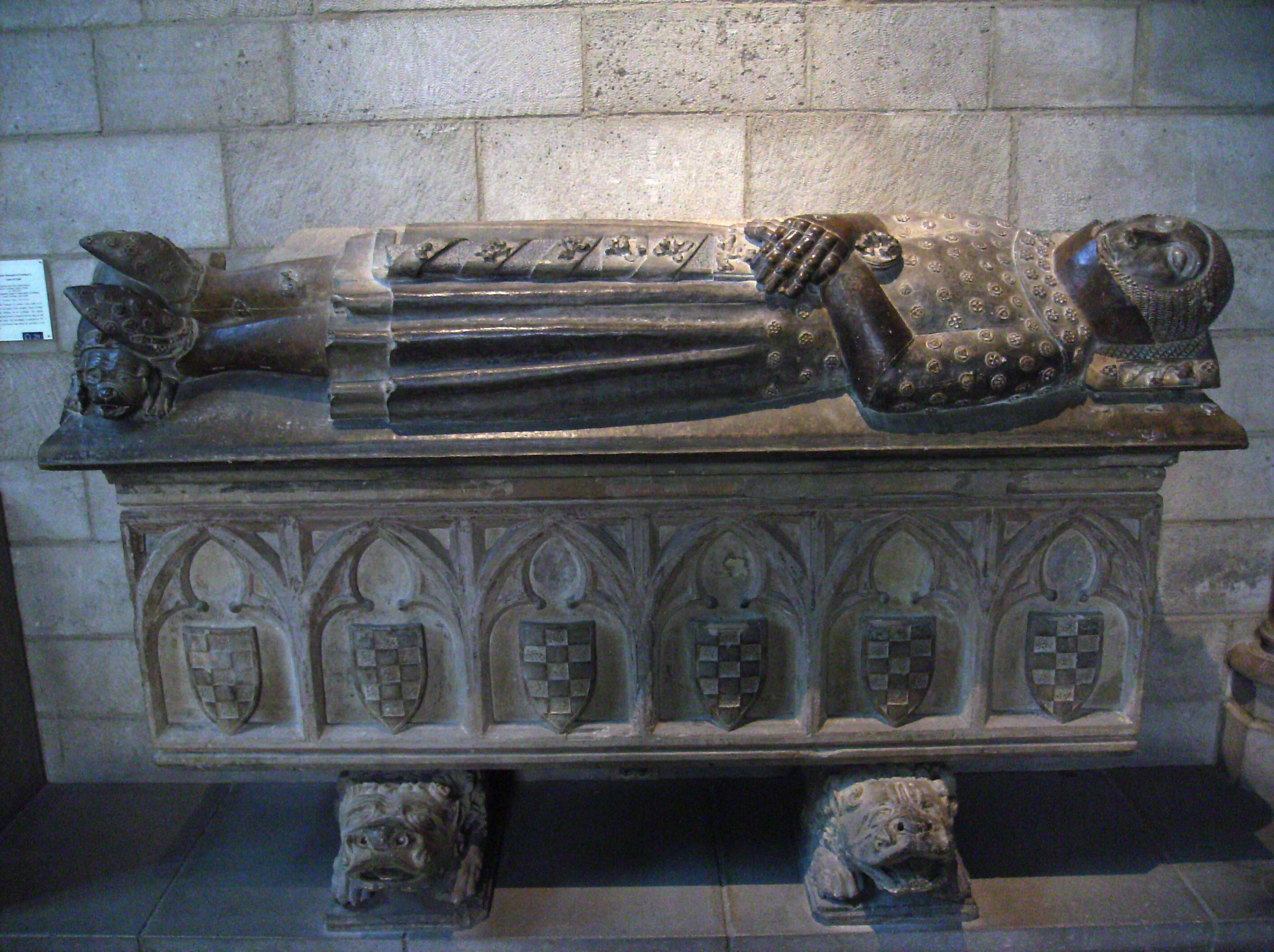
The sepulchre of Ermengol X (1274–1314), Count of Urgell and Viscount of Àger, was sold in the 19th century during the Ecclesiastical Confiscations of Mendizábal. It is now displayed in the Cloisters in New York City.

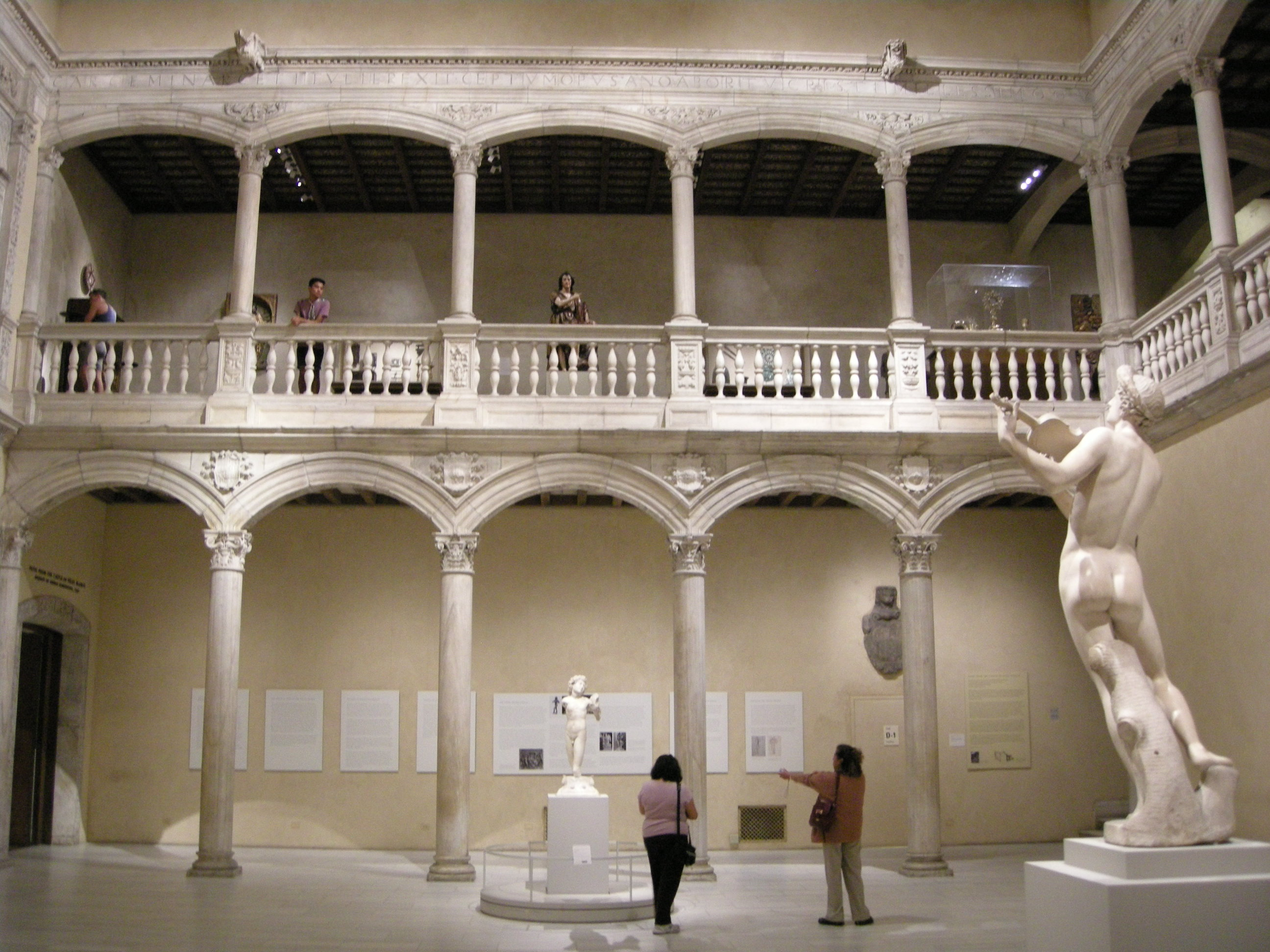
The Renaissance courtyard of the Castle of Vélez-Blanco (c. 16th century), which was sold to the United States during the liberal confiscation in 1903 and is now in the Metropolitan Museum of Art in New York.

The Spanish confiscation was the Spanish government's seizure and sale of property, including from the Catholic Church, from the late 18th century to the early 20th century. It was a long historical, economic, and social process beginning with the so-called "Confiscation of Godoy" in 1798, although there was an earlier precedent during the reign of Charles III of Spain. The practice ended on 16 December 1924.

Confiscation consisted of the forced expropriation of land and property from the "mortmains" (i.e., the Catholic Church and religious orders, which had accumulated it from grants, wills, and intestates) and from municipalities. The government then sold the property on the market or through public auctions. A similar phenomenon occurred in other countries, such as Mexico. (Note: For example, in Mexico, the Law of confiscation of the rural and urban properties of the civil and religious corporations of Mexico, nicknamed the lerdo law, was issued on 25 June 1856 by President Ignacio Comonfort. 500 years of Mexico in documents: Lerdo Law. Law of confiscation of properties of the church and corporations)

The principal goal in Spain was to obtain money to pay off the public debt securities, known as vales reales, that the state issued to finance itself. The government also hoped to increase national wealth, to create a bourgeoisie and a middle class of farmers who owned the lands they cultivated, and to foster capitalist conditions (e.g., privatization and a strong financial system) so that the state could collect more taxes. Confiscation was one of the political weapons with which Spanish liberals modified the system of ownership of the country's Ancien Régime during the first half of the 19th century.

== Confiscation in the Ancien Régime ==
=== Proposals of Olavide and Jovellanos ===
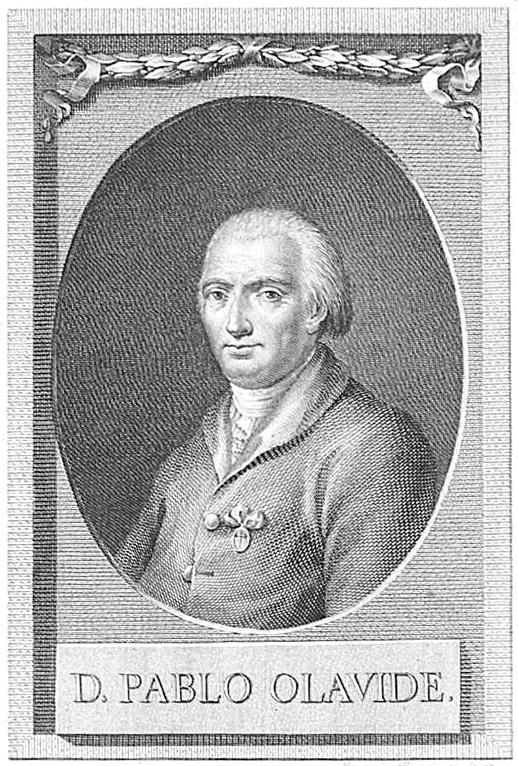
A portrait of Pablo de Olavide by Juan Moreno Tejada, painted before 1805.

Officials attributed the struggles of Spanish agriculture during the Ancien Régime to the amount of amortized property held by the "mortmains" (primarily the Church and municipalities). These lands were generally poorly cultivated and remained outside the market because they were inalienable—that is, they could not be sold, mortgaged or given away. This led to an increase in the price of "free" land, and the amortized property was not taxable because of the privileges of its owners. In a report in 1787, José Moñino, the 1st Count of Floridablanca and minister to Charles III, complained of "major damages of the amortization".

Pablo de Olavide and Gaspar Melchor de Jovellanos both proposed selling disused solars: uncultivated and uninhabited municipal lands that were generally used as pasture for cattle.

Olavide viewed the protection given to livestock as a cause of agricultural backwardness and argued that "all the lands should be put to work". Under his proposal, disused solars would be sold mainly to the rich, because they had the means to cultivate the land, with a smaller number reserved for farmers who had two pairs of oxen. The proceeds would be used to establish a provincial savings bank that would provide funds for public works such as roads, canals and bridges.

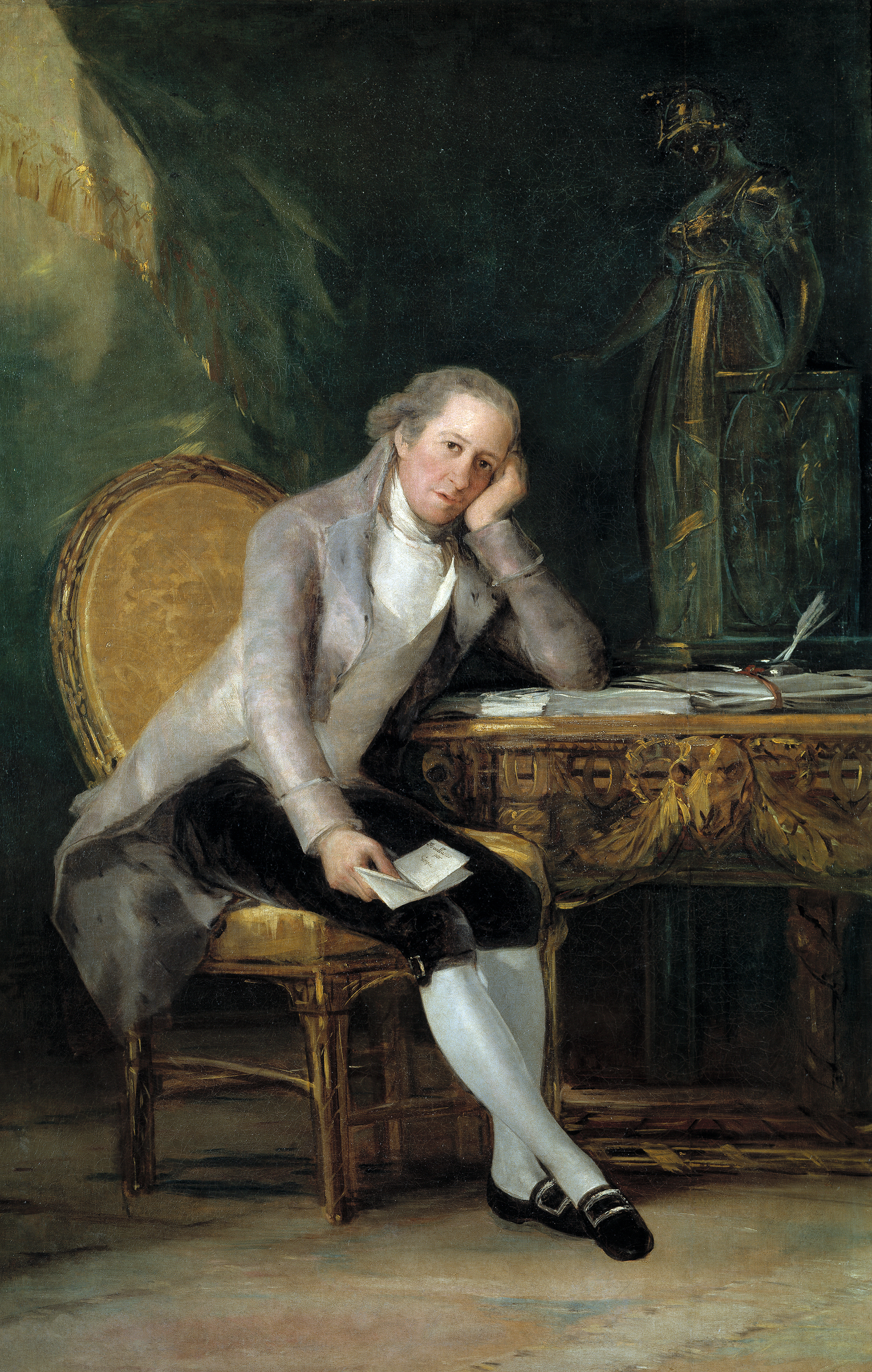
Gaspar Melchor de Jovellanos, portrayed by Goya.

Jovellanos's proposal was much more radical, because unlike Olavide—who called for the sale only of disused solars, thereby respecting municipal resources—he suggested privatizing "council lands", including municipal properties that brought in tax revenue. Jovellanos, a fervent supporter of economic liberalism, defended the "free and absolute" sale of these properties, with no distinctions among the potential buyers. Unlike Olavide, he was not worried about the possibility that the land would pass into the hands of a few magnates, because, as noted by Francisco Tomás y Valiente, he considered the "liberation" of disused solars and council lands to be "a good in itself". Jovellanos's ideas, which were widely disseminated through his 1795 Report on Agrarian Law, influenced the liberals who launched the confiscations of the 19th century much more than Olavide's proposals, which were not as well publicized.

Olavide and Jovellanos did not advocate the confiscation of Church property, but they suggested limiting, by peaceful means, the acquisition of more land for ecclesiastical institutions. This proposal was rejected by the Church and by most members of the Royal Council when it was put to a vote in June 1766. Two leaflets defending it were included in the Index Librorum Prohibitorum of the Spanish Inquisition: Report on Agrarian Law (1795), by Jovellanos, and Treaty of the Royalty Payment of Amortization (1765), by Pedro Rodríguez, Count of Campomanes.

=== Charles III ===
In an effort to quell the Esquilache Riots in the spring of 1766, the corregidor-intendente of Badajoz ordered the renting of city property to "needy neighbors", with priority given to day laborers who could work the land. The 10th Count of Aranda, newly appointed by Charles III, extended the measure by royal decree to all of Extremadura on 2 May 1766, and to the whole kingdom the following year. A subsequent order in 1768 explained that the measure was intended to serve the poorest farmers and laborers, to promote the "common good". However, the measure was repealed on 26 May 1770.

Strictly speaking, this measure was not a confiscation, because the land in question was not sold; it was leased and remained the property of the municipalities. The royal decree that replaced it prioritized leases "to the laborers of one, two and three yokes", thus abandoning the initial social purpose. To justify the change, the government alluded to "problems that have followed in the practice of the various provisions issued earlier about distribution of lands", referring to the fact that many laborers and poor peasants who had received plots of lands had been unable to cultivate them properly and lacked the means to pay the censuses, since the original decree was not accompanied by loans.

Olavide—who had openly criticized the first measures because he believed the beneficiaries lacked the means to put the land to full use—went on to direct projects in Andalusia and the Sierra Morena region, in which settlers received enough money to begin to cultivate the land they were granted, and were initially exempt from taxes and censuses.

As Francisco Tomás y Valiente noted, the actions of Charles III were driven more by economic concerns (the need to farm uncultivated land) than by a desire for social reform. However, they were connected to a wider goal of reforming Spain's agricultural economy.

=== Confiscation of Godoy ===
During the reign of Charles IV, in September 1798, the Confiscation of Godoy was launched by Mariano Luis de Urquijo and Miguel Cayetano Soler, the Secretary of the Treasury (who had held that position during the government of Manuel Godoy, removed from power six months before). Charles IV obtained permission from the Holy See to expropriate land belonging to the Jesuits and other religious entities, including hospitals, hospices and residential colleges. Altogether, the confiscations accounted for one-sixth of the Church's property.

Francisco Tomás y Valiente called the Confiscation of Godoy a turning point in linking confiscation to the problems of public debt, unlike the approach taken by Charles III, who presented confiscation as a way to reform (to a very limited extent) the agrarian economy. The subsequent liberal confiscations of the 19th century continued the approach of the Confiscation of Godoy, not that of Charles III.

== Confiscation in the 19th century ==
=== Joseph Bonaparte (1808–13) ===
On 18 August 1809, Joseph Bonaparte ordered the removal of "all regular, monastic, mendicant and clerical Orders", whose assets would automatically belong to the nation. Many religious institutions were thus dissolved with no consideration of canon law.

Bonaparte also ordered a lesser confiscation, which did not seize property, but rather the income derived from property. The money went to support the French troops in the Napoleonic Wars. This confiscation ended in 1814.

=== Cortes of Cádiz (1810–14) ===
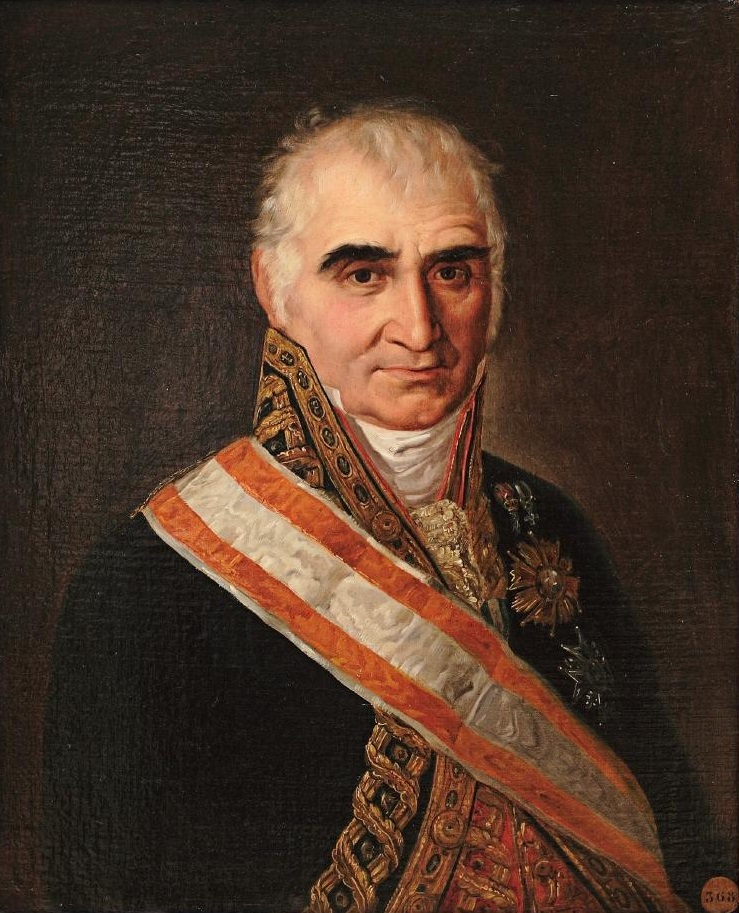
José Canga Argüelles, portrayed by José Cabana.

In March 1811, the deputies of the Cortes of Cádiz (the Spanish national assembly) recognized the huge debt accumulated in the form of vales reales during the reign of Charles IV—a debt that the acting treasury secretary, José Canga Argüelles, estimated to be 7 billion reales. After rejecting the argument that the vales reales should only be recognized for their market value—which was well below their nominal value, and would have bankrupted the holders and made it impossible to obtain new loans—the Cortes of Cádiz approved a proposal made by Argüelles. The proposal called for the confiscation of certain goods from the mortmains, which would then be auctioned. Two-thirds of the auction price would go toward the payment of national debt securities, which included the vales reales of the previous reign as well as new "notes of liquidated credit", which were issued from 1808 on to defray the expenses of the War of Spanish Independence. The remainder of the auction proceeds was dedicated to the payment of interest and the capital of the national debt.

A decree on 4 January 1813 called for the confiscation of all disused solars in order to provide "relief" to non-landowning citizens and "an award for the meritorious defenders of the homeland". To achieve three purposes at once—fiscal, patriotic and social—it divided the confiscated property in half. The first portion would be sold at auction, and the proceeds used to pay the national debt. The second would be divided into lots of land to be given for free to people who had served in the war, and for a fee to landless citizens. If the latter recipients failed to pay the fee, they lost the assigned lot, which diminished the social aim proclaimed in the decree.

In a decree on 13 September 1813, which included the Argüelles proposal, the term "national goods" was applied to the properties that were to be confiscated. The targets of the confiscation included supporters of Manuel Godoy, the French, the Knights Hospitaller and four Spanish military orders (the Order of Santiago, Order of Alcántara, Order of Calatrava and Order of Montesa); the convents and monasteries suppressed or destroyed during the war; the farms of the Crown, except sites intended for the service and recreation of the king; and half of the disused municipal solars. This decree was never carried out because of the return of Ferdinand VII and the absolute state, according to Francisco Tomás y Valiente, but it established the legal principles and mechanisms of subsequent confiscations.

=== Trienio Liberal (1820–23) ===
In 1820, after the Constitution of 1812 was restored, the Trienio Liberal once again faced the problem of the national debt, which had not been resolved during six years of absolutist rule (1814–20). On 9 August 1820, the new courts revalidated the Cortes of Cádiz's decree of 13 September 1813, but added properties obtained in the Spanish Inquisition to the list of confiscation targets. The new decree differed from previous ones in that it measured vales reales by their nominal value, which was much higher than the market value.

Because the market value of debt securities was so low compared with their nominal value, the cash paid by buyers was much lower than the appraised price—in some cases, less than 15 percent of the nominal value. As a result, in 1823, some deputies proposed suspending the confiscation decree and the delivering ownership of the properties in question to their tenants. One of these deputies declared that "the farms have been taken over by rich capitalists, and these, once they have taken possession of them, have made a new lease, generally increasing the rent to the poor farmer, threatening to spoil if they do not pay on time". But despite the criticism, the confiscation process continued unchanged.

By an order of 8 November 1820 (which would be replaced by another decree on 29 June 1822), the Trienio revived the Cortes of Cádiz's decree of 4 January 1813 on the sale of unused lands and goods from the municipalities. A decree on 1 October 1820 also included ecclesiastical confiscation, which the Cortes of Cádiz had not addressed. This decree concerned the monasteries of the monastic orders; the regular canons of Saint Benedict, St. Augustine and the Premonstratensians; the convents and colleges of the military orders, the Knights Hospitaller, and the Orders of Saint John of God and the Bethlehemite Brothers; and "all other hospitals of any kind". Their goods and immovable properties were "applied to the public credit" as "national assets" subject to immediate confiscation. A few days later, on 11 October 1820, a law was issued prohibiting real estate purchases by mortmains, a measure first advocated in the 18th century by Rodríguez and Jovellanos.

=== Confiscation of Mendizábal (1836–37) ===
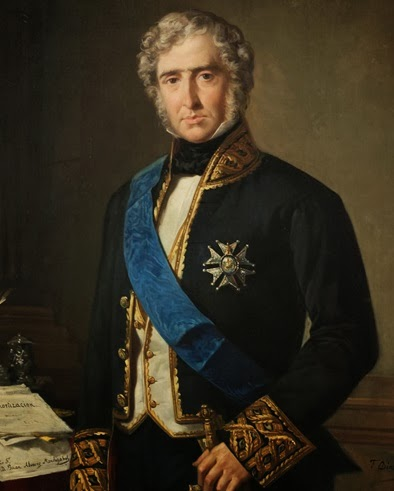
Prime Minister Juan Álvarez Mendizábal.

Juan Álvarez Mendizábal (prime minister of Queen Regent Maria Christina) and Pascual Madoz (finance minister of Queen Isabel II) were responsible for the two most important liberal confiscations. The 1836 Ecclesiastical Confiscation undertaken by Mendizábal, in particular, had major consequences for the economic and social history of Spain.

The division of land was entrusted to municipal committees, which took advantage of their power to create large lots that were affordable only for very wealthy oligarchs. Small farmers could not enter competitive bids, and the land was bought by nobles and the urban bourgeoisie, preventing the development of a true middle class who could pull Spain out of stagnation.

Because the confiscation applied only to regular clergy members, the Church decided to excommunicate both the sellers and buyers of the land. As a result, most people chose not to buy lots directly. Instead, they made their purchases through intermediaries or strawpersons.

=== Confiscation of Espartero (1841) ===
On 2 September 1841, the newly appointed regent, Baldomero Espartero, ordered the confiscation of the estates of the Church and religious orders, with a bill authored by the finance minister, Pedro Surra Rull. The law was repealed three years later.

In 1845, during the Moderate Decade, the government tried to restore relations with the Church, leading to the signing of the Concordat of 1851.

=== Confiscation of Madoz (1855) ===
During the bienio progresista period (at the forefront of which were Espartero and Leopoldo O'Donnell), Finance Minister Madoz carried out a new confiscation, which was executed with greater control than Mendizábal's. The order was published in La Gaceta de Madrid on 3 May 1855, and the instruction to carry it out was given on 31 May. It included the lands and censuses of the state; of the clergy; of the military orders of Santiago, Alcántara, Montesa and St. John of Jerusalem; of confraternities, sanctuaries and shrines; of a former infante, Don Carlos; and of the mortmains. The religious schools and hospitals of John of God were exempt because they reduced government spending in these areas.

Confiscation had long been a subject of confrontation between conservatives and liberals, but there came a time when all political parties recognized the need to put idle assets to use in order to promote Spain's economic development. The application of the Madoz law was suspended on 14 October 1856 but resumed two years later, on 2 October 1858, when O'Donnell was president of the Council of Ministers. The changes of government did not affect the auctions, which continued until the end of the century.

Although the Confiscation of Mendizábal has received more attention from historians because of its duration and societal repercussions, the Confiscation of Madoz involved far more sales. In 1867, 198,523 rural properties and 27,442 urban properties were sold. The state collected 7,856,000,000 reales between 1855 and 1895, almost twice that obtained in the Confiscation of Mendizábal. The money went mainly toward the budget deficit, public debt repayment and public works, with 30 million reales per year reserved for the "reconstruction and repair" of certain churches.

The Madoz law has been called a civil confiscation, but this is a misnomer. A large number of farms that had been the common property of the people were, in fact, auctioned, but many more of the properties that were sold had belonged to the Church, and especially to the secular clergy. Nonetheless, the confiscation of farms belonging to rural Spaniards who depended heavily on them condemned millions to emigration and proletarianization in cities. Of all the property auctioned off, it is estimated that 35% belonged to the Church, 15% to charity and 50% to municipalities.

The Municipal Statute of 1924, pushed by José Calvo Sotelo, repealed confiscation laws and thus ended the Confiscation of Madoz.

== Consequences ==
=== Social ===
At the time of the confiscations, Spain could be roughly divided into a southern area with a predominance of large estates and a northern area of small and medium-size farms. According to the historian Richard Herr, one result of the confiscations was that the demographics of the two regions diverged dramatically based on the size of the lots put up for auction, and the structure of land ownership changed. Small lots were typically bought by the inhabitants of nearby villages, while larger lots were acquired by rich Spaniards who lived in cities, often far away. In the south, very few small farmers had the financial resources to bid for the large estates, which reinforced the region's landlordism. In the north, however, this did not generally happen.

Another consequence was the privatization of communal properties that had belonged to the municipalities. Many farmers were deprived of resources on which they depended for survival (e.g., firewood and pastures), which fueled the emigration of the rural population to industrialized areas of the country or to the Americas. This migration reached its peak in the late 19th and early 20th centuries.

=== Religious ===
The confiscations also led to the exclaustration of thousands of religious by the government of the Count of Toreno. The Royal Order of Ecclesiastical Exclaustration of 1835, issued on 25 July, suppressed convents with fewer than twelve professed members. On 8 March 1836, a new decree suppressed virtually all monasteries (with some exceptions, such as Piarists and Hospitallers), and a decree on 29 July 1837 did the same for female convents (except for the Sisters of Charity).

Julio Caro Baroja has drawn attention to the figure of the old, exclaustrated priest, who—unlike young men, many of whom joined the Carlists or the National Militia—lived "enduring their misery, emaciated, teaching Latin in the schools, or doing other underpaid odd jobs". Thus, in addition to economic consequences, the suppression of the religious orders had a "huge impact on the social history of Spain". Caro Baroja quotes the liberal progressivist Fermín Caballero, who wrote in 1837, shortly after the secularization, that "the total extinction of the religious orders is the most gigantic step Spain has taken in the present time; it is the real act of reform and revolution".

The confiscations also changed the appearance of Spain's cities by secularizing them. For example, Salustiano de Olózaga, the Basque-born governor of Madrid, tore down 17 convents there.

=== Economic ===
The confiscations brought in more than 14 trillion reales from auctions, thus improving public finances. They also increased the nation's agricultural productivity and cultivated acreage, and improved and specialized crops through new investment by landowners. In Andalusia, for example, olive and wine production grew considerably. These gains, however, were accompanied by the negative effects of deforestation.

Additionally, most ordinary Spaniards suffered because of the harm done to the subsistence economy when communal lands that had been used primarily for grazing passed into private hands.

=== Cultural ===
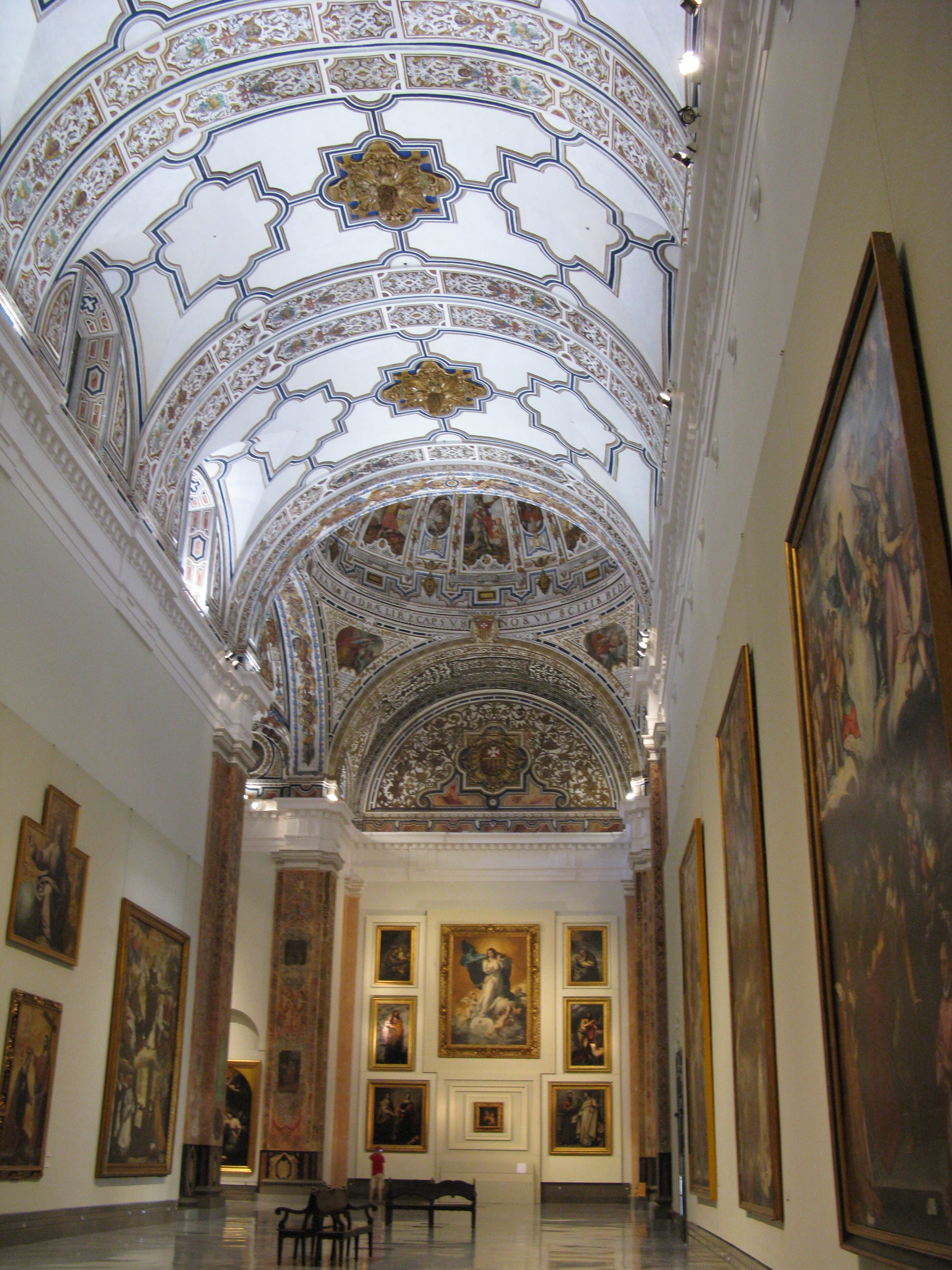
The Museum of Fine Arts of Seville has a large collection of confiscated religious art from convents and monasteries of Seville. The building itself was once a convent.

Many paintings (including some Romanesque) and monastery libraries were sold at low prices and eventually exported to other countries, though many books also went to public libraries or universities. Others fell into private hands and were lost.

The confiscations left numerous buildings of artistic interest, such as churches and monasteries, to ruin, but others, such as the Church of San Martín in Cuéllar, were preserved as museums or other public institutions.

=== Political ===
One of the goals of the 19th-century confiscations was to consolidate the liberal regime. However, although the people who bought properties in the north formed a new class of small and medium-size landowners who supported the regime, the goal was undermined by large landowners' acquisition of most of the confiscated lots in southern Spain.

Around half of the lands that were confiscated had belonged to peasants and other rural people, and rural areas still account for 90% of the territory of Spain. These communal lands supported the peasants' precarious economy, and their confiscation meant the destruction of the peasants' way of life and self-governance.

=== Ecological ===
As a result of the confiscations, millions of hectares of forest fell into private hands and were cleared and plowed, causing immense environmental damage that is still visible today. Indeed, the cost of reforestation, ongoing for 70 years, far exceeds what was obtained from the sales.

The confiscations of the 19th century were one of the biggest environmental disasters for the Iberian Peninsula in centuries. The Confiscation of Madoz, in particular, resulted in the privatization of huge expanses of publicly owned forest. The oligarchs who bought the land paid, for the most part, with wood obtained from it. Much of the deforestation of the Iberian Peninsula occurred at that time, leading to the extinction of many plant and animal species in the region.

=== Other ===
The confiscation of convents contributed to the modernization of Spanish cities, transforming them from cities dominated by religious structures to bourgeois cities with taller buildings and new public spaces. Many former convents became public buildings, including museums, hospitals, offices and barracks. Others were demolished to make room for streets, squares and even multistory car parks. Still others became parishes or, through auctions, passed into private hands.

Many old landmarks, mainly in Castile and Madrid, were demolished during or as a consequence of the liberal confiscations.

== See also ==
- Juan Álvarez Mendizábal
- History of Spain (1808–1874)
