= Cecilia of Comminges =

French noblewoman

- Countess of Urgell
- Born: c.1320
- Died: 16 June 1384; Balaguer
- Spouse: James I, Count of Urgell
- Father: Bernard VIII, Count of Comminges
- Mother: Mathe de l'Isle-Jourdain

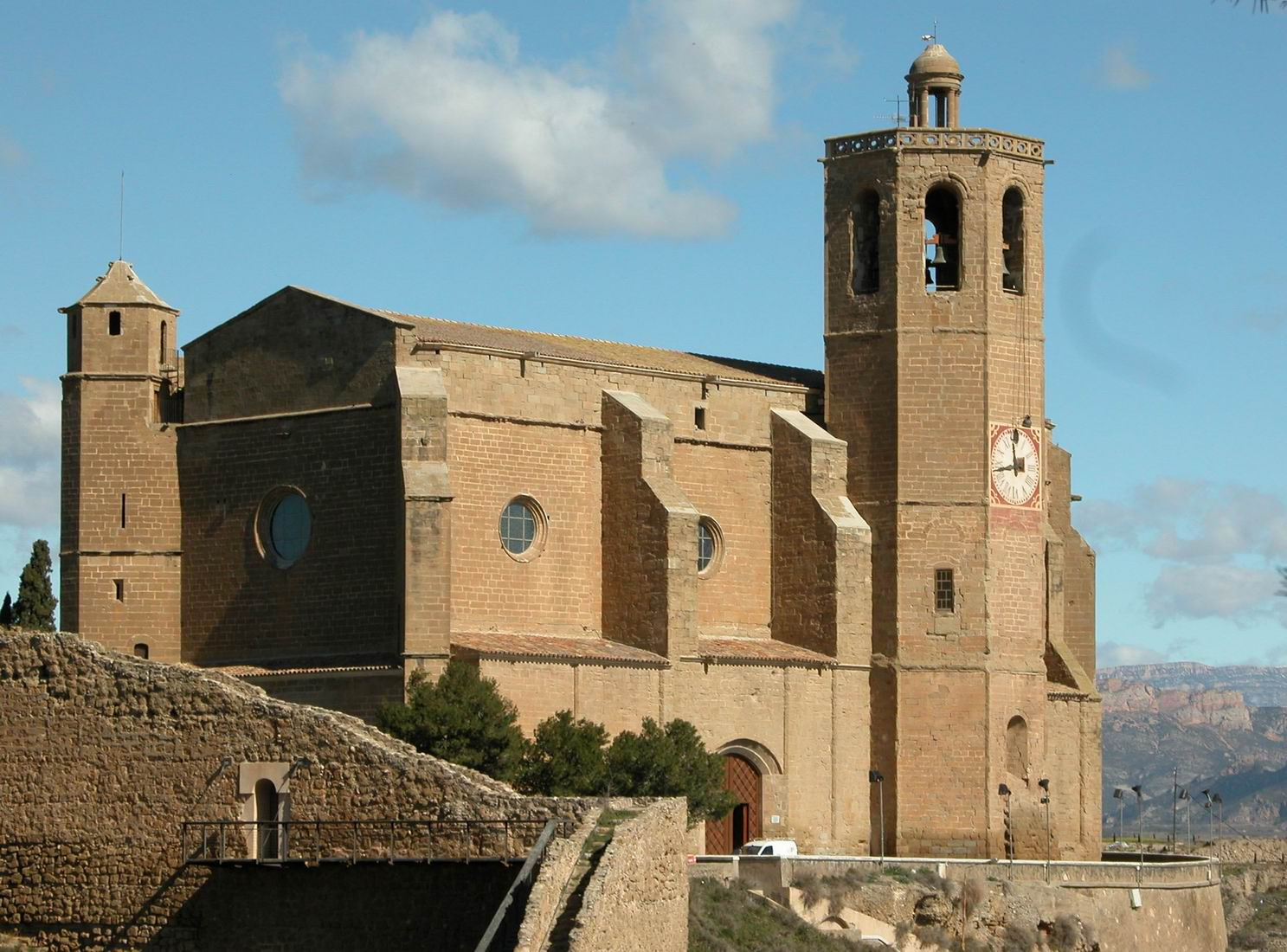
Church of Santa Maria de Balaguer

Cécile de Comminges (c.1320–1384), was suo jure regnant Viscountess of Turenne 1339–1349. She was also Countess of Urgel 1336–1347 by marriage to James I, Count of Urgell, and served as regent of the County of Urgel during the minority of her son Peter II of Urgell in 1347–1360. She was a personal friend of Pope Clement VI and an influential figure in the Papal court of Avignon.

== Biography ==
Cécile de Comminges was the eldest daughter of Bernard VIII, Count of Comminges and Viscount of Turenne and his third wife Mathe de l'Isle-Jourdain.

In 1336, Cécile married James I, Count of Urgell, son of Alfonso IV of Aragon and his first wife Teresa d'Entença who was Countess of Urgell.

In 1339, after the deaths of her father and then her only brother, Jean, aged three, Cécile inherited the viscounty of Turenne, a title her father had received from his second wife, Marguerite de Turenne. The succession of the county of Comminges, however, provoked a conflict with her uncle Pierre-Raymond, brother of Bernard VIII, who disputed the right of women to inherit the county of Comminges, arguing that it was a male fief. The conflict was defused by the intervention of Cardinal Jean de Raymond, Archbishop of Toulouse: Pierre-Raymond became count of Comminges and Cécile became viscountess of Turenne.

Cecilia often attended the Papal court of Avignon at the Palais des Papes during the reign of Clement VI (r. 1342-1352), where she was described as the central female figure and exercised a degree of influence as the personal friend and advisor of the Pope and his patronage. Her influential friendship with the pope caused unconfirmed rumours that she was his mistress, and Petrarch referred to her as "Semiramis with her quiver" and as an example of the decay of the Avignon Papacy.

In 1347, James I died, poisoned by his brother according to some. By the will of her husband, Cécile became regent of the county of Urgell in the name of her son, Peter II. In 1349 she sold the viscounty of Turenne to Pope Clement VI for 145,000 gold florins so as to be able to pay her husband's debts and build certain buildings, notably the church of Santa Maria de Balaguer and the monastery of Santa Chiara de Almatà. The pope offered the viscountcy to his nephew William Roger de Beaufort, who married Cécile's sister Aliénor.

When her son Pierre came of age, Cécile withdrew from the world. She died on 16 June 1384 at Balaguer Castle.

Cécile had two children with James I:

- Peter II of Urgell (1340–1408), who succeeded his father as Count of Urgell and married Margaret of Montferrat
- Isabella of Urgell, who married Hugo de Cardona (1330–1400)

== Sources ==
- Previté-Orton, Charles William (1960). The Shorter Cambridge Medieval History. Vol. 2: The twelfth century to the Renaissance. Cambridge at the University Press.
