= Guerau de Cabrera =

Guerau or Guerao de Cabrera (Occitan: Giraut or Guiraut de Cabreira) may refer to:

- Guerau I de Cabrera
- Guerau II de Cabrera (died c. 1132)
- Guerau III de Cabrera (died c. 1160)
- Guerau IV de Cabrera (died 1228)
