= James I of Urgell =

Count of Urgell (1321–1347)

James I
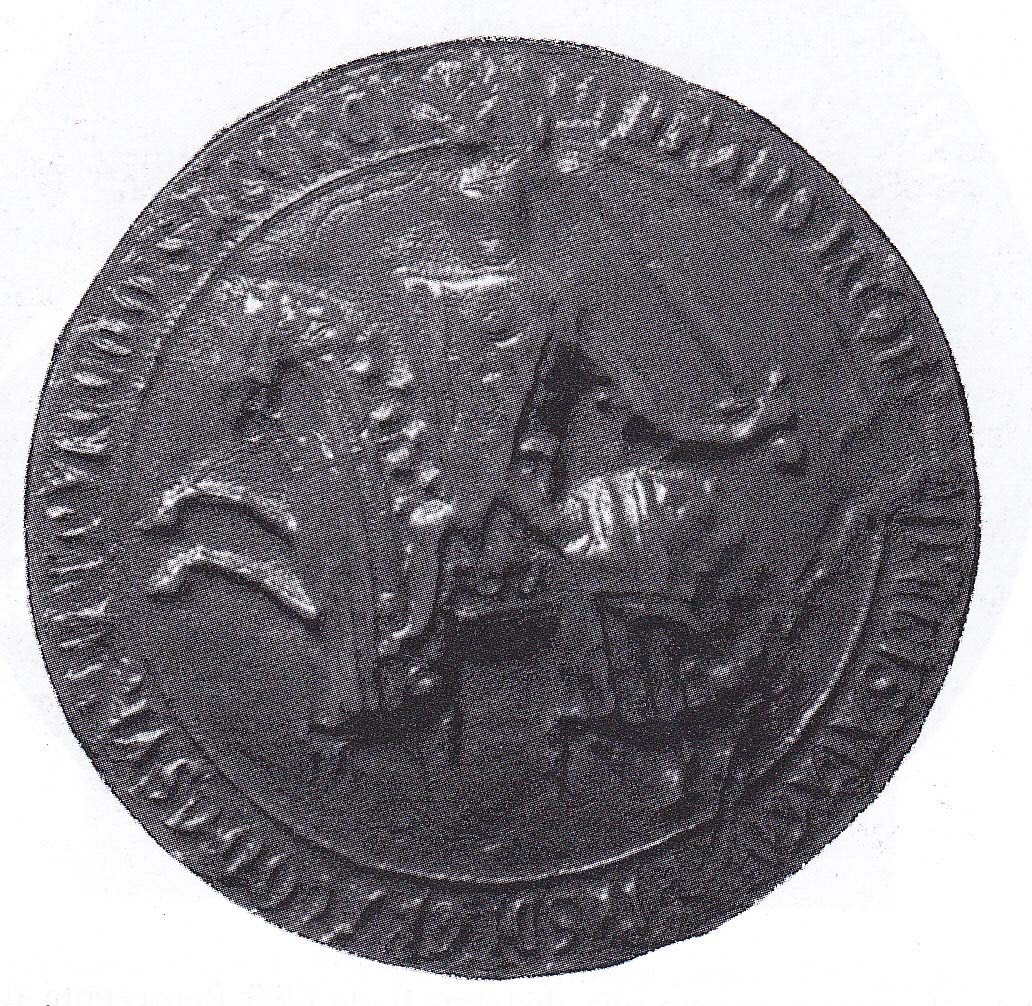
- Coat of arms of Urgell

Count of Urgell
- Reign: 1327–1347
- Predecessor: Teresa d'Entença
- Successor: Peter II, Count of Urgell
- Born: 1321; Zaragoza
- Died: 15 November 1347 (aged 25–26)
- Spouse: Cecilia de Comminges
- Issue: Peter II, Count of Urgell
- House: Barcelona
- Father: Alfonso IV of Aragon
- Mother: Teresa d'Entença

James I (1321 – 15 November 1347), the eighteenth Count of Urgell, was the fourth son of Alfonso IV King of Aragon and Teresa d'Entença & Cabrera, 17th Countess of Urgell.

== Biography ==
James was born in Zaragoza in 1321. His older brother, Peter, inherited the Crown of Aragon. James inherited his mother's title.

He married Cecilia de Comminges (1321–1381), the daughter of Bernard VIII, Count of Comminges and Viscount of Turenne, in 1336 in Catalonia. They had two children, Peter 19th Count of Urgell and Isabella.

James is believed to have been poisoned by his brother Peter in Barcelona, Catalonia.

Through an illegitimate daughter, James is an ancestor of Maria Teresa, Grand Duchess of Luxembourg.

Preceded by Teresa d'Entença	Count of Urgell; 1327-1347	Succeeded by Peter II
