= Bernard VIII =

Bernard VIII may refer to:

- Bernard VIII, Count of Comminges (c. 1285–1336)
- Bernhard VIII, Count of Lippe (1527–1563)
