= Pedro Ansúrez =

Castilian nobleman

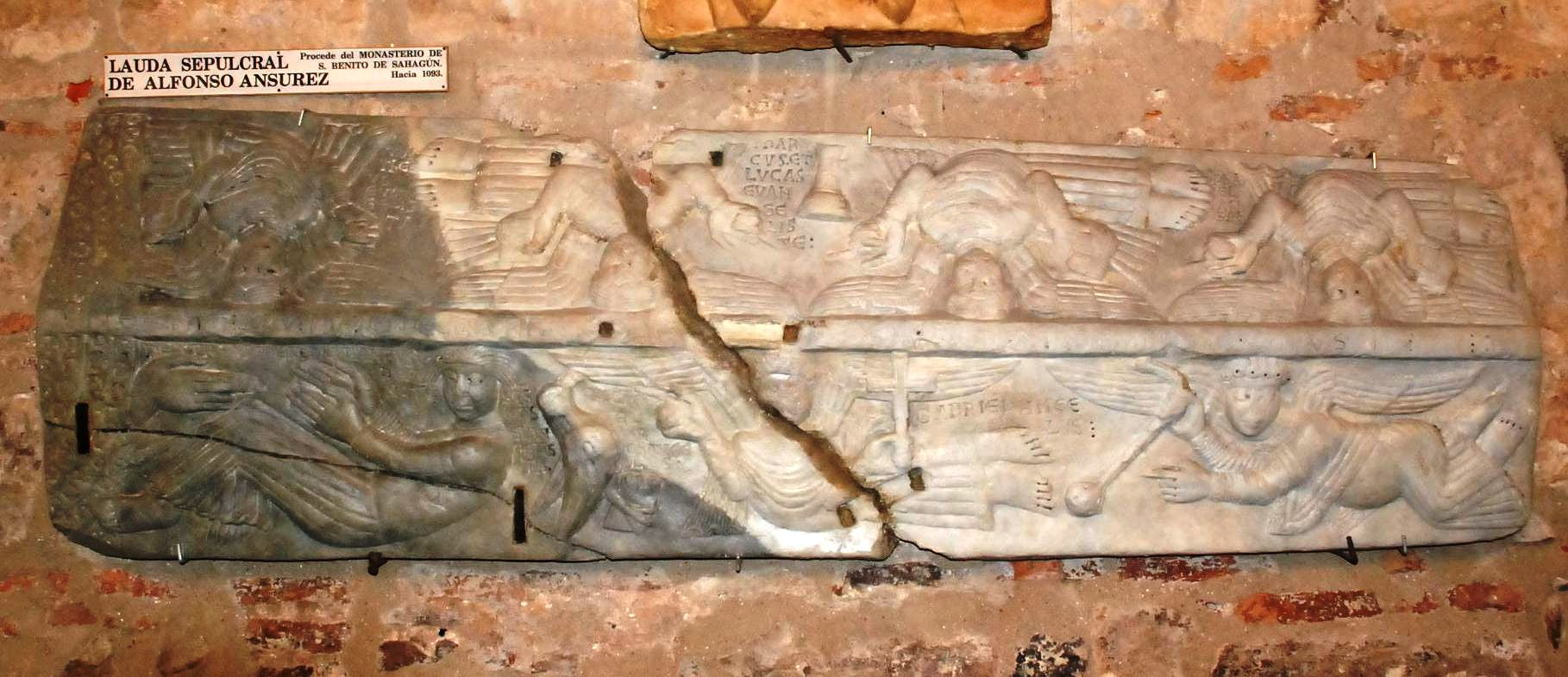
Sarcophagus commissioned by Pedro for his young son Alfonso. Originally in the monastery of Sahagún, it is now in the museum of San Isidoro de León. His epitaph reads: "On the sixth day of the Ides of December in the year of the Era 1131 [10 December 1093] died Alfonso, the dear son of Count Pedro Ansúrez and Countess Eylo."

Pedro Ansúrez (floruit 1065–1117; died probably 9 September 1118) was a Castilian nobleman, count of Liébana, Saldaña and Carrión in the closing decades of the eleventh century and the opening decades of the twelfth. He is considered the founder and first lord of Valladolid.

Pedro was a descendant of the Beni Gómez family of Castilian nobility, the son of Ansur Díaz, by his first wife, whose name is unknown. His grandfather, Diego Fernández, was a count of Saldaña and Carrión. Pedro married twice, the first time by 17 June 1084 to Elo (or Eylo), daughter of Count Alfonso Muñoz and Aldonza González of Trigueros. She was dead by 17 September 1114, when Pedro made a donation for the good of her soul to the canons of the cathedral of Valladolid, and he appears the next day with his second wife, Elvira Sánchez, whom he may have wed some time before. Pedro had five children: Alfonso, Fernando, María, Mayor, and Urraca. Alfonso died young and his sarcophagus, commissioned by Pedro, can still be seen in the museum of Sahagún. Pedro and Elo's children were raised in the household of a lesser nobleman: that of Citi Álvarez and his wife Froilo, who were duly rewarded for their services with a grant of land.

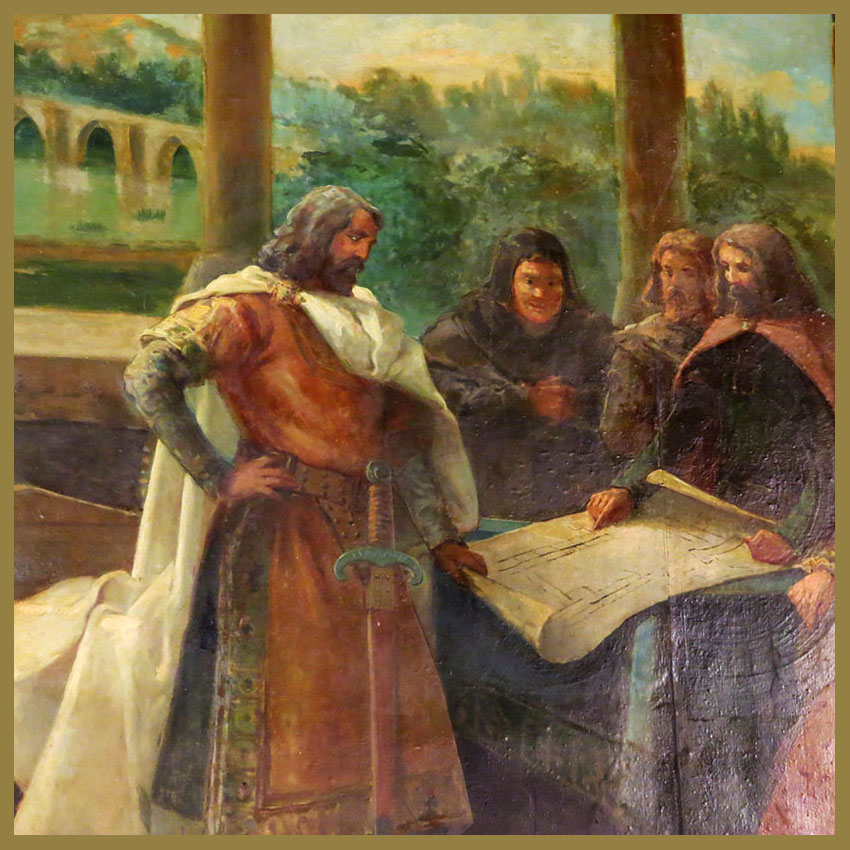
Pedro Ansúrez planning the Colegiata de Santa María; from a mural by Eugenio Oliva.

Pedro was one of the nobles closest to Alfonso VI of León and Castile, although the later claim that he was Alfonso's tutor or guardian during his youth must be dismissed, since the king and Pedro were of roughly the same age. During 24 July–3 September 1067 Pedro served as the majordomo of Alfonso's court. He was raised by the king to the rank of count perhaps as early as 22 November 1068, certainly before 1 November 1070, after which time he always signs charters using the title. In 1072, he accompanied Alfonso into exile in Toledo. Later, when Alfonso returned to inherit the kingdoms of León and Castile, Pedro and Eylo were charged with the repopulation of Valladolid. This they did with men from their counties of Saldaña and Carrión. However, the city really began to grow when its lordship was given to Pedro some years later. He became a prolific builder, constructing a large palace for himself and his wife, which has not survived, and a hospital. He built a bridge over the Pisuerga and many religious edifices, like the church of Santa María la Antigua and the Colegiata de Santa María, which served as the site of the cathedral (the bishop's seat). The environs of Valladolid formed the outer limits of the Kingdom of Castile at his time and Pedro was responsible for the repopulating of the region between Liébana and Cuéllar. His massive frontier district included the historically significant city of Toledo. In 1095, his lordship included Madrid.

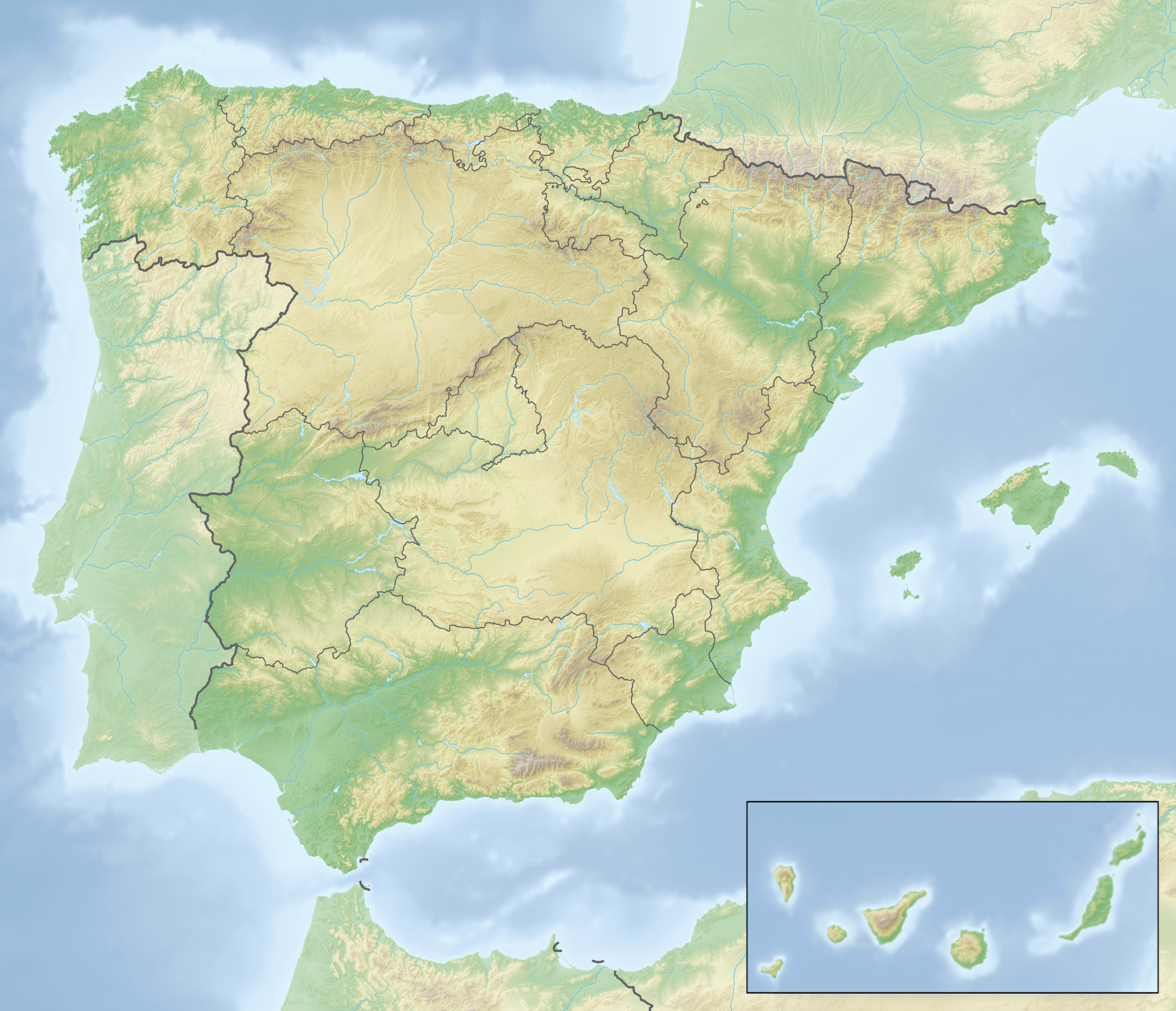
Lands held or controlled by Pedro Ansúrez, and his exiles: clockwise from top, Liébana, Cabezón, Entrepeñas, Saldaña, Carrión, Melgar, Torremormojón, Valladolid, Simancas, Tordesillas, Toro and Zamora, plus Madrid to the south, not all controlled simultaneously; blue, count Pedro's exiles: Toledo (1072) to the south, where he would later also hold land, and the County of Urgell (1105) to the east.

Around 1087, at the time of the marriage of Alfonso's eldest daughter and heir presumptive, Urraca, to Raymond of Burgundy, the king appointed Pedro to be her guardian (tutor), and she stayed at his court according to the later Primera Crónica General (late 13th century). This probably served to prevent the accumulation of too great influence in the hands of the French. Towards the end of the century, Pedro's power and influence were diminished by the extension of that of the Capetians Raymond and Henry of Burgundy.

When his daughter María was widowed by the Count of Urgel, Ermengol V, Pedro transferred the guardianship of her son, Ermengol VI, to Raymond Berengar III of Barcelona. Between 1103 and 1108, Pedro was in exile in Urgell, having displeased Alfonso VI. He took an active part in the conquest of Balaguer. Pedro brought with him to Urgell his armour-bearer (armiger), a knight by the name of Íñigo Pérez. Only the greater magnates could afford to employ officers like this. The armiger, or alférez, was responsible for leading Pedro's mesnada (retinue) into battle.

In 1114, out of fear of Hell, Pedro Ansúrez donated some land at Fuensaldaña to the church of Valladolid.

In 1143, Sancho Ansúrez, Pedro's grandson by his daughter Urraca, introduced the Premonstratensian Order into Spain when he became abbot of Fuentesclaras, moved to Retuerta in 1146. Sancho had studied under Saint Norbert at Prémontré.

== Sources ==
- Barton, Simon F. The Aristocracy in Twelfth-century León and Castile. Cambridge: Cambridge University Press, 1997.
- Reilly, Bernard F. The Kingdom of León-Castilla under Queen Urraca 1109–1126. Princeton University Press: Princeton, 1982.
- Reilly, Bernard F. The Kingdom of León-Castilla under King Alfonso VI 1065–1109. Princeton University Press: Princeton, 1988.
- Rodríguez Fernández, J. Pedro Ansúrez. León: 1966.
