= Guerau IV de Cabrera =

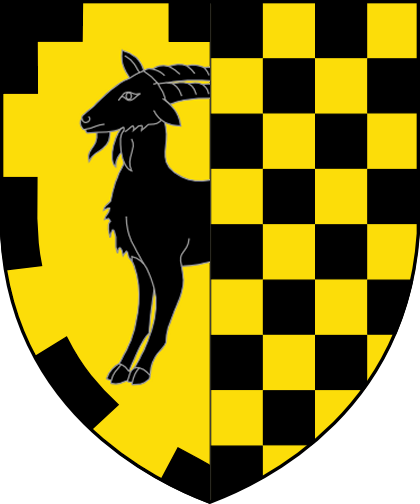
Coat of arms of the House of Cabrera-Urgel

Guerau IV de Cabrera (1196–1229) was a claimant to the County of Urgel during the reign of James I of Aragon. His uncle, Ponç III of Cabrera had married Marquesa, the daughter of Ermengol VII, in 1194. Marquesa’s father, Ermengol VII, was the son of Ermengol VI and his first wife, Arsenda of Cabrera. Through these familial connections to the House of Cabrera, Gerau claimed the County of Urgell.

In 1208, following the death of Armengol VIII, Guerau claimed that Armengol's daughter, Aurembiaix, could not inherit the county and that he should be made its ruler. Aurembiax's mother, Elvira, however, maintained control of the county until her death in 1220. That year, Guerau assumed control of the County of Urgell as Guerau I.

In 1228, Guerau was forced out of Urgel, and the county came under the rule of Aurembiaix, due to circumstances beyond his control. He retained the titles of Guerau IV, viscount of Cabrera and Guerau III, viscount of Ager. The death of Aurembiaix and Guerau the following year allowed other relatives to assert control. His son by Elo Perez de Castro became Guerau V, viscount de Cabrera, but the viscounty of Ager was consolidated with the county of Urgell under Aurembiaix's second husband Peter I, Count of Urgell. In 1236, his younger son Ponce became Ponce I, Count of Urgell, and Viscount of Ager, and in 1243 he assumed the title Ponce IV de Cabrera, thereby consolidating administration of the lands as Guerau IV had envisioned.
