= Álvaro, Count of Urgell =

Count of Urgell (1239–1268)

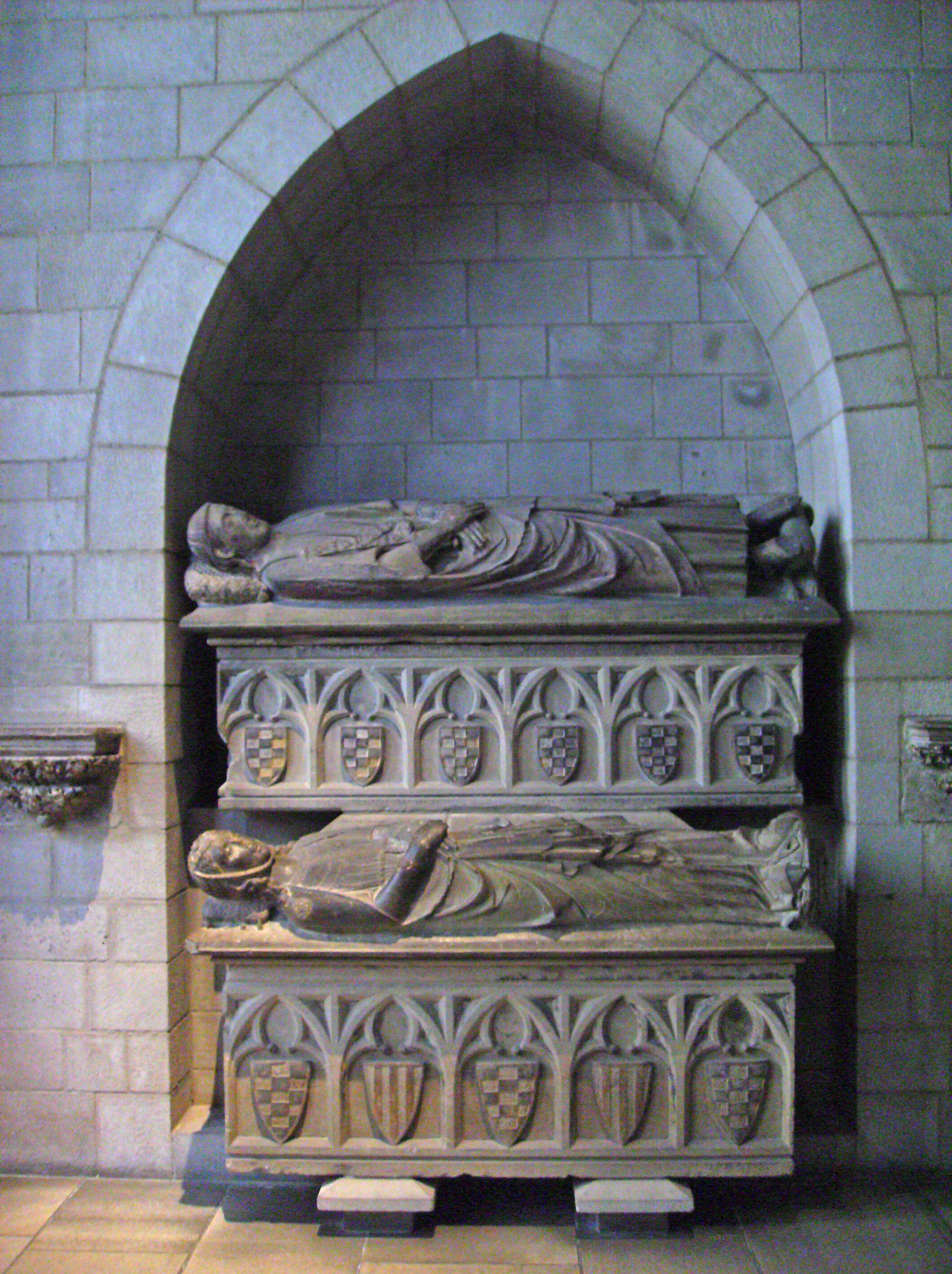
Sepulchre of Álvaro I and Cecília de Foix at The Cloisters, New York

Álvaro (1239 in Burgos – 1268 in Foix), called Àlvar el Castellà ("the Castilian") in Catalan, was the Count of Urgell and Viscount of Àger from 1243. He was the son of Ponce I, Count of Urgell and succeeded his brother Ermengol IX within a year of their father's death.

Upon inheriting the county of Urgell, he exchanged his birth name, Rodrigo, for Álvaro and married Constance of Montcada, a relative of the ruling family of Béarn, at the order of James I of Aragon in 1253. However, he detested this marriage and had it annulled, marrying Cecilia of Foix, daughter of Roger-Bernard II of Foix, in 1256. This was to be the source of great enmity and conflict between the houses of Béarn and Foix. The House of Barcelona supported the Bearnese.

In 1259, Álvaro breached his feudal obligations to the king of Aragon and brought down the royal wrath on his principality: the seneschal Pere de Montcada invaded and occupied Ponts. In 1267, the king of Aragon intervened again, this time in the legal dispute between Álvaro's two wives. Álvaro was forced to flee with his wife Cecilia of Foix, leaving Urgell in the hands of his son Ermengol X.

== See also ==
- County of Urgell

Preceded by Ermengol IX	Count of Urgell; 1243 – 1268	Succeeded by Ermengol X
