= Peter I of Urgell =

Peter I
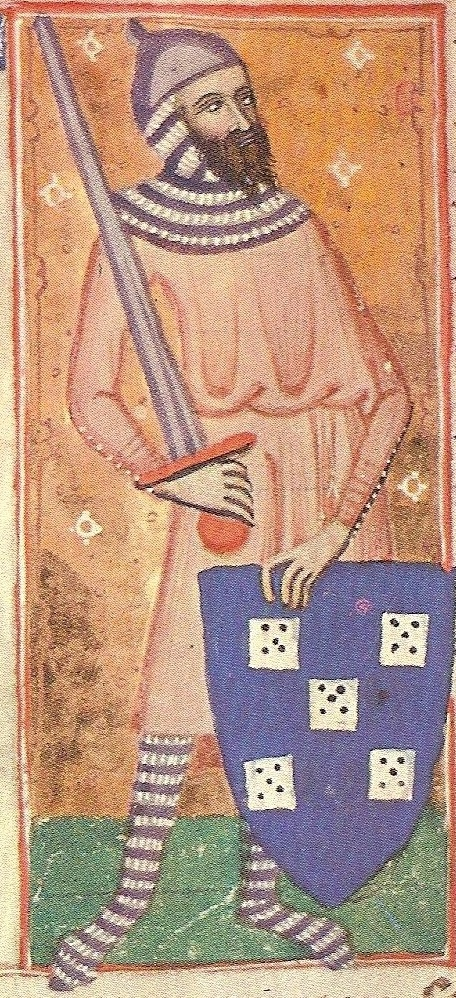

jure uxoris Count of Urgell
- Reign: 1229-1231
- Predecessor: Aurembiaix
- Successor: James I
- Co-Ruler: Aurembiaix

Mayordomo mayor de León
- Reign: 1223-1230

Lord of Balearic Islands
- Reign: 1236-1258
- Born: 23 February 1187; Coimbra, Kingdom of Portugal
- Died: 2 June 1258 (aged 71); Balearic Islands, Crown of Aragon
- Burial: Palma de Mallorca, Spain
- Spouse: Aurembiaix, Countess of Urgell
- Illegitimate children: Rodrigo de Urgel; Fernando Pedro de Urgel
- House: Portuguese House of Burgundy
- Father: Sancho I of Portugal
- Mother: Dulce of Aragon

Peter I (Portuguese: Pedro, pronounced [ˈpeðɾu]) (23 February 1187 – 2 June 1258) was the second son of King Sancho I of Portugal and his wife Dulce, infanta of Aragon, and would eventually become Count of Urgell and Lord of the Balearic Islands. Most of what is known about him comes from the Tratado da Vida e Martírio dos Cinco Mártires de Marrocos.

== Biography ==
Peter was born in Coimbra.

After the death of his father, Peter took the side of his sisters Mafalda, Sancha and Theresa, in their quarrel with his elder brother, now King Afonso II, over inheritance of the castles of Seia, Alenquer and Montemor-o-Novo, Peter got the protection of his sister Theresa, then Queen of León, from whose territory he launched several inconclusive attacks on the Portuguese border province of Trás-os-Montes e Alto Douro, but eventually had to concede defeat and perpetual exile from Portugal.

Peter then left León to become a mercenary in the service of Yusuf II, the Almohad Caliph, commanding a troop of Christian exiles and adventurers in Marrakesh. As such, he was in 1220 involved with the arrival in Morocco of Berard of Carbio and four other Franciscan missionaries. Prior to setting out to the Muslim lands, the Franciscans had met with Peter's sister, who told them that she had "a little piece of Morocco in her heart" and asked them to give Peter her love. Once arrived, the Franciscans started preaching in Marrakesh and strongly denouncing Islam and Muhammad. The Caliph declared them "mad" and charged Peter and his Christian soldiers with escorting them out of his kingdom. However, the Franciscans managed to avoid Peter and his men, and repeated their act, highly sacrilegious in Muslim terms, in the market-place of Marrakesh - leading to their being decapitated by the Caliph personally.

Subsequently, Peter moved to Aragon, his mother's homeland, where he became involved in the schemes and campaigns of his relative, the young and ambitious King James I.

In June 1229, Pope Gregory IX asked Peter to come to Italy with his knights to fight in the War of the Keys against the Emperor Frederick II. Peter did not go. That year Peter - continuing his family tradition of seeking a bride in Catalonia - married Countess Aurembiaix of Urgell, who had long been exiled from Urgell by the usurper Guerau IV de Cabrera, and who had been James I's mistress. With Peter as her husband and co-ruler, James helped Aurembiaix regain Urgell under the Aragonese overlordship - after she and Peter agreed to hand over to the King the city of Lleida (see James's acquisition of Urgell).

In 1230, Peter helped the Bishop of Tarragona to conquer the Balearic island of Ibiza from the Moors.

Following Aurembiaix's death in 1231, Peter continued as Count of Urgell in a titular capacity, but this position was disputed by his overlord James I.

In 1236 they came to an agreement by which Peter gave up Urgell, which was given over to the rule of the House of Cabrera and was eventually annexed to Aragon. In exchange, Peter got the newly conquered Balearic islands of Mallorca, Ibiza and Formentera, as well as the castles of Pollença, and Alaró (also in the Baleares) and of Almudaina (in Alicante).

Peter ruled these Balearic possessions until his death there in 1258. As he left no legitimate issue, they then reverted to the Aragonese Crown, later becoming the core of Kingdom of Majorca ruled by a minor branch of the Aragonese Royal Family.

Peter left two illegitimate sons, Rodrigo and Fernando.

== Sources ==
- Loud, G. A. (2016) [2011]. "The Papal 'Crusade' against Frederick II in 1228–1230". In Michel Balard (ed.). La Papauté et les croisades / The Papacy and the Crusades. Routledge. pp. 91–103.
- Lower, Michael (2014). "The Papacy and Christian Mercenaries of Thirteenth-Century North Africa". Speculum. 89 (3 July). The University of Chicago Press: 601–631. doi:10.1017/S0038713414000761. S2CID 154773840.
