= Ponce I of Urgell =

Ponce I (died 1243) was count of Urgell in Catalonia from 1236 until his death.

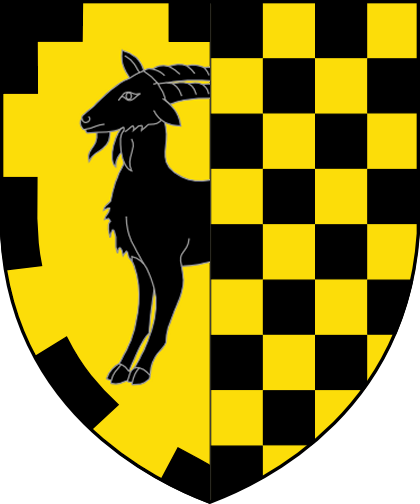
Coat of arms of Urgell (right part) and Cabrera (left part).

He was the first count of Urgell from the Cabrera family.

He also held the Viscounty of Àger.

He was succeeded as count by his two sons.

== Family ==
He married María González Girón and had issue:

- Ponce (Catalan: Ponç), died young;
- Ermengol IX c. 1235–1243, count of Urgell, viscount of Cabrera & Àger.
- Álvaro (Catalan: Àlvar) 1239–1268, count of Urgell, viscount of Cabrera & Àger.
- Guerau 1242–1271;
- Eleanor (Catalan: Elionor);
- Marquessa (Catalan: Marquesa).

== Notes ==
- Chaytor, H. J. A History of Aragon and Catalonia. London: Methuen, 1933.
- biography (Spanish)
