= Elvira of Subirats =

Elvira de Subirats (died 1220) was an Andorran regent. She was the regent of the County of Urgell during the minority of her daughter Aurembiaix in 1209–1220.

She married Arnaud I of Castelbon and became the mother of Aurembiaix.

After Arnaud's death in 1208, Elvira married Guillem IV de Cervera.
