= Aurembiaix =

Aurembiaix (or Aurembiax) (1196–1231) was the Countess of Urgell from 1208, the last of her dynasty.

She was the only child of Ermengol VIII and Elvira of Subirats. In 1206, Ermengol asked Peter II of Aragon to defend the right of his daughter to inherit and his widow to have the regency. This also happened in 1209, when Aurembiaix became countess under the regency of her mother. However, after Peter's death (1213), Guerau IV of Cabrera, a first cousin of Aurembiaix's who claimed the inheritance, invaded the county and took control.

Aurembiaix married Álvaro Pérez de Castro in 1212, but in 1228 she had the marriage annulled and returned to Urgell to claim her right to succeed. She received the support of James I of Aragon and signed an agreement with him (which some scholars say was to become his concubine) at Agramunt. Threatened with invasion and a possible marital alliance with Aragon, the nobles of Urgell accepted Aurembiaix as their ruler. In 1229, Aurembiaix in turn married Peter, exiled brother of Afonso II of Portugal, and rendered Lleida to James and accepting Urgell back from him as a fief.

Aurembiaix died without descendants at Balaguer only about a year later. Urgell went to Peter.

== See also ==
- James I of Aragon#Acquisition of Urgell
- List of female rulers and title holders

| Preceded by Ermengol VIII | Countess of Urgell; 1208–1231 | Succeeded by Peter I |
