= Guerau III de Cabrera =

Guerau III de Cabrera (died 1160/61), also called Guiraut (or Giraut) de Cabreira, was a Catalan nobleman and Occitan troubadour. He was the viscount of Àger and Cabrera from 1145. He was the son of Ponç II de Cabrera and Sancha.

Guerau is today most famous for his ensenhamen, a long didactic poem written for his jongleur, Cabra. Cabra's name, which means goat and is related to the name of his master's viscounty (Cabrera), probably indicates that he was Guerau's herald, since heralds often took the names of the arms of their lords. Guerau's arms bore a goat.

The ensenhamen is divided into 216 lines. The rhyme scheme is of two four-syllable rhyming lines followed by an octosyllabic line ending in -on, repeated. The entire poem is basically a disorderly and wordy catalogue the things (names, songs, and stories) which Cabra ought to know in his capacity as public entertainer, but which in fact he does not know. The eruditeness of the work is impressive, giving evidence of Guerau's learning, the writings he would have had access to in twelfth-century Catalonia, and the typical repertoire of a contemporary jongleur.

The ensenhamen begins with twenty-four lines of criticism concerning what Cabra does not do. He is accused of mal saps viular / e pietz chantar: poor knowledge of how to play the viol and worse still of singing. He cannot finish with a proper "Breton cadence" (tempradura de breton). Guerau goes on:

Non sabs balar ni trasgitar a guiza de juglar guascon.	You don't know how to dance nor how to gesture in the manner of the Gascon jongleurs.

Finally, Guerau lists the various genres and types of song which Cabra does not have in his repertoire: sirventesc, balaresc, estribot, retroencha, and contenson. It is clear that by Guerau's time, Occitan lyric poetry had already witnessed a proliferation of genres. To the historian of culture, these twenty-four lines are an important source for the qualifications of a good jongleur.
