= Teresa d'Entença =

Countess of Urgell
- Tenure: 1314–1327
- Born: c. 1300
- Died: 20 October 1327 (aged 26-27); Zaragoza
- Burial: Zaragoza Franciscan Church
- Spouse: Alfonso IV of Aragon (m. 1314)
- Issue among others...: Peter IV of Aragon; James I, Count of Urgell; Constance, Queen of Majorca
- House: House of Entença; Barcelona (by marriage)
- Father: Gombau d'Entença
- Mother: Constança d'Antillón

Teresa d'Entença (c. 1300 – 20 October 1327) was the eldest daughter of Gombau d'Entença and Constança d'Antillón. She was Countess of Urgell in her own right; however, control over her estate passed to her husband, Alfonso IV of Aragon.

== Biography ==
Before dying childless at La Llitera, Teresa's granduncle Ermengol X of Urgell agreed to make Alfonso heir to the County of Urgell, on the condition that Alfonso marry Teresa, who was his rightful heir. Alfonso agreed to this and he married Teresa in 1314 in the Cathedral of Lerida. Alfonso is reputed to have been so liberal in the expenses during the wedding, that the local counsels imposed restrictions on how much he could spend.

Teresa died whilst giving birth to her son Sancho on 20 October 1327 at Zaragoza, only days before her husband became king of Aragon. She is buried at Zaragoza Franciscan Church. Her younger son James inherited Urgell.

== Issue ==
Alfonso and Teresa were married for thirteen years, and had seven children:

- Alfonso (1315–1317)
- Constance (1318–1346), married in 1336 to James III of Majorca.
- Peter IV (1319–1387), successor.
- James I, Count of Urgell (1321–1347), also inherited Entença and Antillon.
- Isabella (1323–1327).
- Fadrique (1325-died young).
- Sancho (1327), lived only a few days.

== See also ==
- House of Entença

== Sources ==
- Alamán, Lucas; Manuel Orozco y Berra. Diccionario universal de historia y de geografía. p. 152.
- E. Michael Gerli, Samuel G. Armistead, ed. (2003). Medieval Iberia: an encyclopedia. Routledge.
- O'Callaghan, Joseph F. (1975). A History of Medieval Spain. Cornell University Press.

Teresa d'Entença House of Cabrera Born: circa 1300 Died: 20 October 1327
Regnal titles
Preceded by Ermengol X	Countess of Urgell; 1314–1327	Succeeded by James I
