= L'Esquirol =

- Municipality
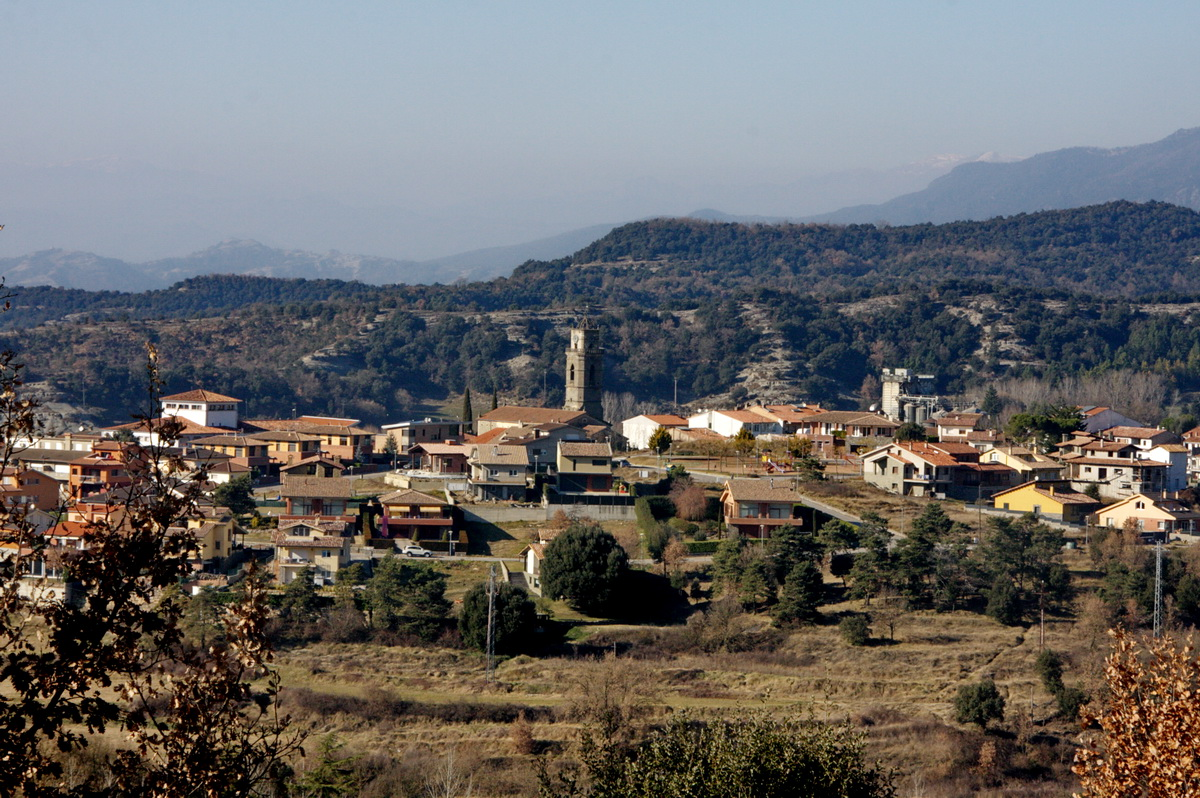
- L'Esquirol

- Flag Coat of arms

- Location in the Province of Barcelona Location in Catalonia Location in Spain
- Coordinates: 42°2′14″N 2°22′10″E
- Country: Spain
- Community: Catalonia
- Province: Barcelona
- Comarca: Osona

Government
  - Mayor: Àlex Montanyà i Rifà (2015)

Area
  - Total: 61.8 km^{2} (23.9 sq mi)
- Elevation: 693 m (2,274 ft)

Population (2025-01-01)
  - Total: 2,301
  - Density: 37.2/km^{2} (96.4/sq mi)
- Postal code: 082541
- Website: lesquirol.cat

L'Esquirol (Catalan for 'the squirrel', Catalan pronunciation: [ləskiˈɾɔl]) known as Santa Maria de Corcó until 4 June 2014, is a municipality in the comarca of Osona in Catalonia, Spain.

== Etymology ==
The name l'Esquirol (literally "the squirrel") comes from a former local inn Hostal de l'Esquirol which was recorded in the 17th century, but is thought to be ultimately from the old Catalan "es querol", meaning "the little rock".

"Esquirol" is used as a pejorative term for strikebreakers in Catalan and Spanish, equivalent to "scab" in English. Legend has it that this meaning originated in the 19th century, when striking workers of a textile factory in the town of Manlleu were replaced by textile workers from the town of Esquirol. The Manlleu workers called the strikebreakers "esquirols" as an insult.

== History ==
The village dates to the 15th century when it formed along the path from Vic to Olot. The settlement started around an inn called the Hostal de l'Esquirol on a homestead named Parai. The village was popularly known as L'Esquirol. The other name of the village, Santa Maria de Corcó, was added in 1743 when the Corcó parish relocated to Esquirol, and became the official name of the municipality in Francoist Spain. On 4 June 2014 the name was officially changed back to L'Esquirol.

== Villages ==
- Cantonigròs
- Sant Julià de Cabrera
- Sant Martí Sescorts
