= Bernard VIII, Count of Comminges =

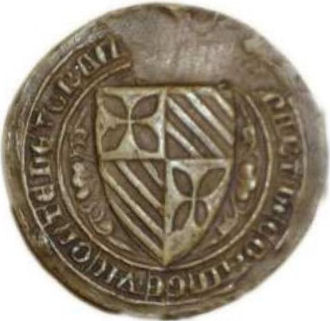

Bernard VIII of Comminges (c. 1285–1336) was the Count of Comminges in what is now southern France. He was the son and successor of Count Bernard VII of Comminges (died 1312) and Laura of Montfort (died before 1300).

The County of Comminges lay in the valley of the Garonne, in the northern foothills of the Pyrenees. The county of Couserans lay to the west and that of Bigorre to the east. The ruling family were descended from the Counts of Foix.

Count Bernard married three times, but died without a male heir; a posthumous son, Count Jean I, died in infancy in 1339. Bernard had five or six daughters of whom Jeanne married the son of Bernard's brother, Count Pierre-Raymond I (died 1341), also named Pierre-Raymond (II), who ruled from 1341 until about 1375–1376. The marriage produced two daughters, Alienòr and Marguerite, but the line died out in 1443 at Marguerite's death, and the county passed to the French Crown in 1453 on the death of Marguerite's husband.

The most famous child of Bernard's was Cecilia I of Urgell.
