= Viscounty of Àger =

Viscounty of Àger Vescomtat d'Àger (Catalan)
- 1094–1413
- Coat of arms
- Status: Feudal territory of the Crown of Aragon; In personal union with the County of Urgell; (1236–1327); (1336–1413); In personal union with the Kingdom of Aragon; (1327–1336)
- Capital: Àger
- Common languages: Old Catalan
- Religion: Roman Catholicism
- Government: Viscounty
- Viscount of Àger
  - 1094–1132: Guerau I del Baix Urgell i II de Girona (first)
  - 1408–1413: James II (last)
  - Present holder: Alexander Jou y Sambucy de Sorgue
- Historical era: Middle Ages
  - Broke off the County of Urgell: 1094
  - Merged with the Crown of Aragon: 1413
Preceded by	Succeeded by
County of Urgell	Crown of Aragon
- Today part of: Spain

The Viscounty of Àger (Catalan: Vescomtat d'Àger) was a feudal jurisdiction that branched off the County of Urgell in 1094.

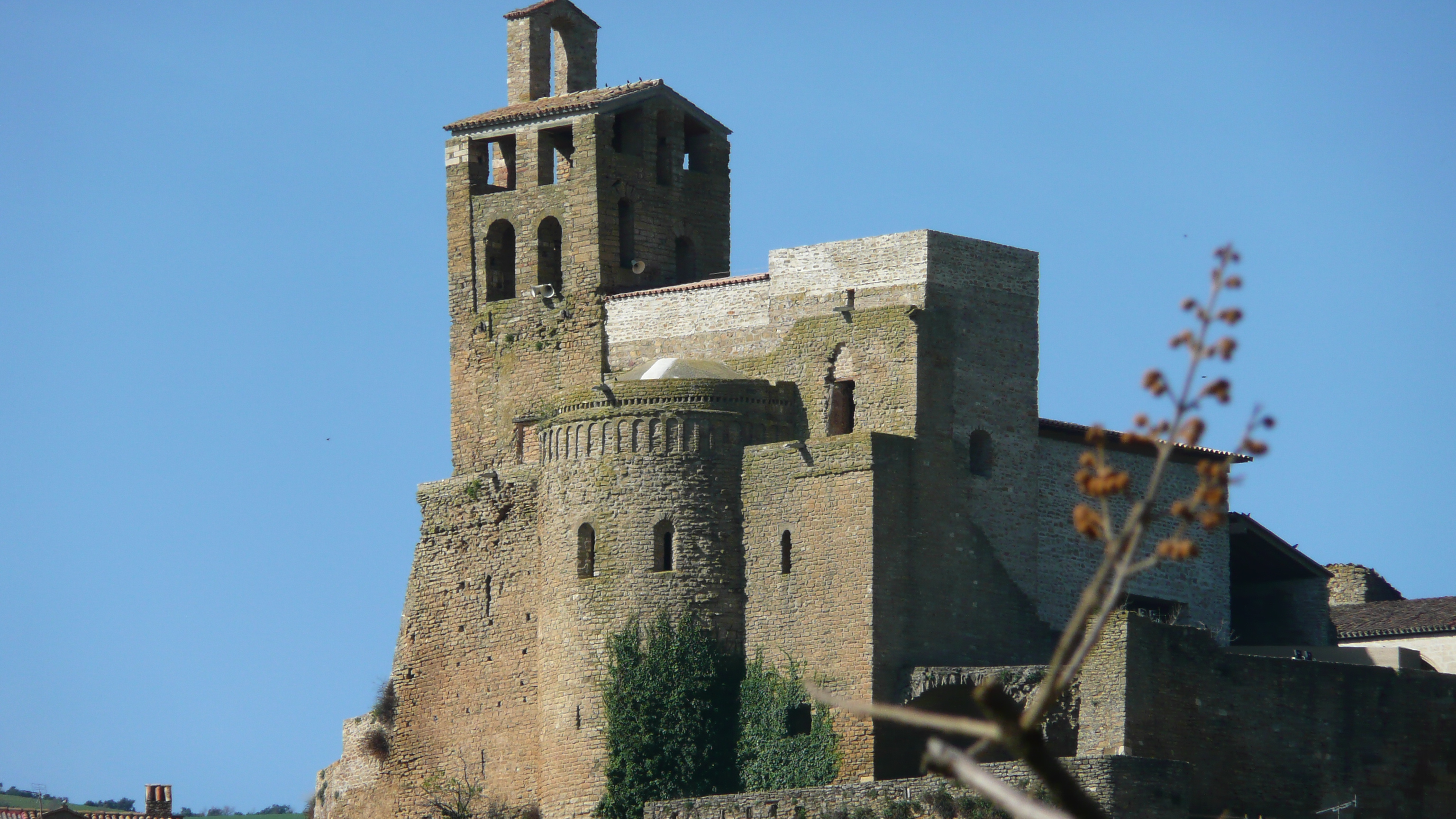
Castle of Àger

== History ==
Towards 1030 Arnau Mir, Lord of Tost, conquered Àger from the saracens. The latter however, fought back and reconquered Àger shortly thereafter. Following a period of long-drawn battles Arnau Mir finally conquered Àger in 1047, driving out the saracens from the region for good. Arnau became connected to the viscounts of Urgell through his sister's marriage.

By 1094, when the Catalan nobles were preparing for the conquest of Balaguer further south, Àger became the centre of the newly created Viscounty of Lower Urgell (Vescomtat del Baix Urgell). This viscounty was given to Guerau II Viscount of Girona, the grandson of Arnau Mir, Lord of Tost. In his will, written in 1132, this viscount refers to himself already as Viscount of Àger.

The current holder is prince Alexandre de Sambucy de Sorgue, member of the French noble house of Sambucy

== List of viscounts ==
- Guerau I del Baix Urgell i II de Girona 1094-1132 (Viscount of Àger before 1132)
- Ponç I d'Àger i II de Cabrera i de Girona (son, associated 1122–1131) 1131–1145
- Guerau II d'Àger i III de Cabrera 1145–1161
- Ponç II d'Àger i III de Cabrera 1161–1199
- Guerau III d'Àger i IV de Cabrera 1199–1229
- Ponç III d'Àger, IV de Cabrera i I d'Urgell 1229–1243 (Count of Urgell)
- Ermengol I, 1243 (Count of Urgell)
- Àlvar I 1243–1267 (Count of Urgell)
- Ermengol II 1267–1268 (Count of Urgell)
- Àlvar II d'Àger 1268–1299
- Ermengol II 1299–1314 (for the second time after the death of his brother Àlvar II)
- Teresa d'Entença 1314 (countess of Urgell)
- Alfons I el Benigne 1314–1336 (King of Aragon)
- Jaume I 1336–1347 (Count of Urgell)
- Pere I 1347–1408 (Count of Urgell)
- Jaume II 1408–1413 (Count of Urgell)
- Merged with the Crown of Aragon, 1413.

== See also ==
- Counts of Urgell
