= Ermengol IX =

Catalan nobleman (c. 1235 – 1243)

- Count of Urgell
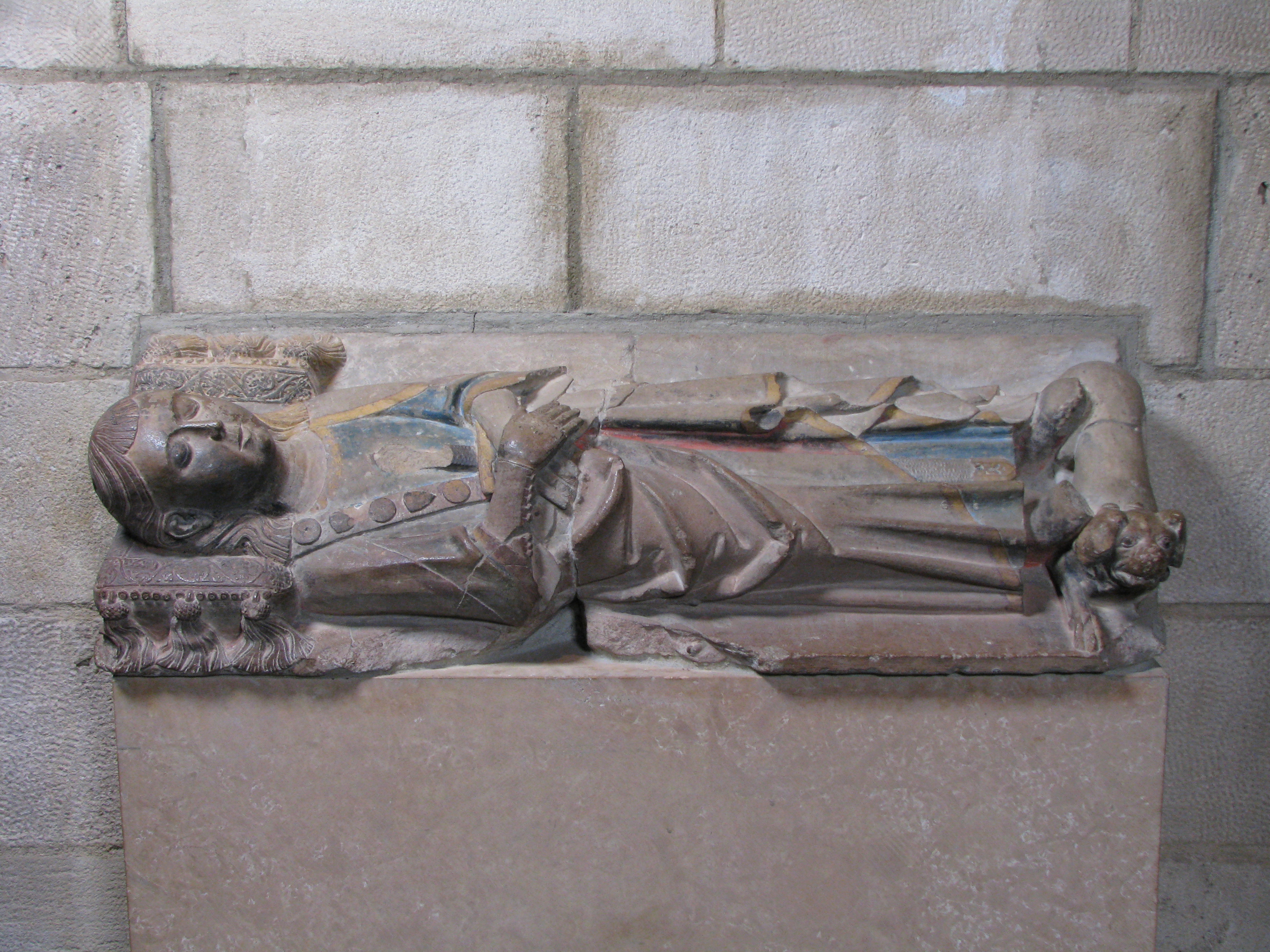
- Tomb effigy in The Cloisters.
- Reign: 1243
- Born: c. 1235; County of Urgell, Catalonia
- Died: 1243 (aged 8); Balaguer, Lleida
- Family: House of Cabrera
- Father: Ponce I, Count of Urgell
- Mother: María Girón

Ermengol IX (c. 1235 – 1243) was a medieval Catalan nobleman. After his father's death in 1243, the eight-year-old boy succeeded as Count of Urgell. However, he, too died during the same year, a situation in which he was the only Count of Urgell to die during his early years. The son of Ponce I of Urgell and María Girón, he was buried in the Church of Santa Maria de Farfaña.

== Early life ==
Born in the County of Urgell as the son of Ponce I of Urgell and IV of Cabrera and his wife, he was one of six children. Born the second son, he became heir apparent at his older brother Ponce's untimely death. He had three brothers: Ponce (died young), Álvaro, who eventually succeeded him and Guerau (1242-1271), who died unmarried. He also had two sisters: Eleanor (Catalan: Leonor) and Marquessa (Catalan: Marquesa).

== Count of Urgell ==
When Ponce died in 1243, young Ermengol succeeded. Due to his young age, his mother acted as regent. Another regent was James of Cervera (Catalan: Jaume de Cervera).

== Death and burial ==
Young Ermengol died during the same year. This was not unusual, as the mortality rate for children was very high in those days. He was buried in the Church of Santa Maria de Farfaña, but his tomb was transferred to The Cloisters (Gallery 009) in 1975. It is now displayed at the Metropolitan Museum of Art.
