= Ermengol VIII =

12th-century Catalonian nobleman

Ermengol or Armengol VIII (1158–1208), known as el de Sant Hilari ("the one from Sant Hilari") was the count of Urgell from 1184 until his death. He was a son of Ermengol VII and Dulce, daughter of Roger III of Foix.

In 1178, he married Elvira of Subirats, with whom he had an only daughter, Aurembiaix.

During his reign, the decline of his house was initiated at the hands of the viscounts of Àger. In 1206, a period of disorder commenced owing to the ambitions of Guerau IV of Cabrera, who disputed the right of Aurembiaix to succeed. Ermengol extracted a promise from Peter II of Aragon to defend the rights of his widow and daughter.

== Sources ==
- Chaytor, H. J. A History of Aragon and Catalonia. London: Methuen, 1933.
- Sánchez de Mora, Antonio. La Nobleza Castella en la Plena Edad Media: El Linaje de Lara (ss. XI-XIII) Doctoral Thesis, Universidad de Sevilla, 2003.

Preceded by Ermengol VII	Count of Urgell; 1184–1208	Succeeded by Aurembiaix
