= House of Cabrera =

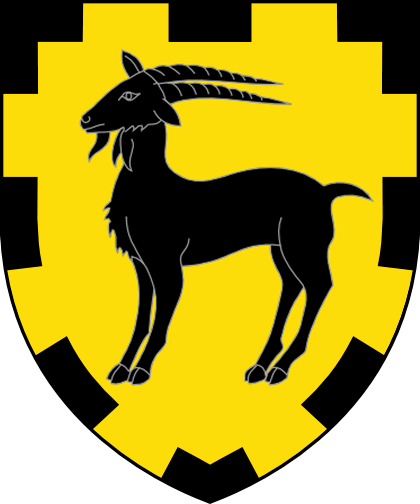
Coat of arms of Bernat IV de Cabrera

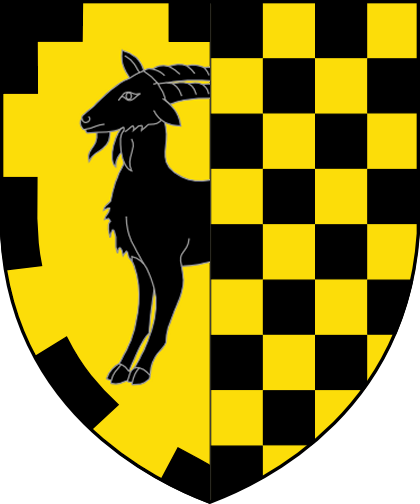
Cabrera-Urgell coat of arms

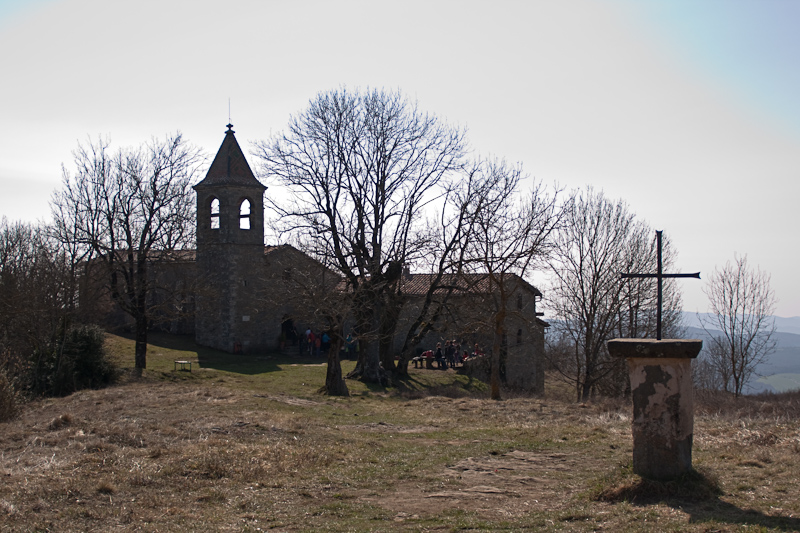
Sanctuary of Cabrera near Santa Maria de Corcó.

The House of Cabrera was an important Catalan dynasty. It began to rule in the Viscounty of Girona, which would be called Viscounty of Cabrera, as well as the Viscounty of Àger, the Sicilian County of Modica and the County of Urgell.

== Origin ==
The dynasty has its origins in the Castle of Cabrera (Castell de Cabrera) at L'Esquirol, a village included now in the municipality of Santa Maria de Corcó, in the natural comarca known as Cabrerès, Osona. The first documented ruler is Gausfred de Cabrera in 1002. His son Guerau I de Cabrera married Ermessenda de Montsoriu, daughter of the Viscount of Girona Amat de Montsoriu. In this manner the lineage of Cabrera went on to rule the Viscounty of Girona, formerly known as Viscounty of Montsoriu.

== Viscounts of the House of Cabrera ==
- 1002-1017: Gausfred de Cabrera
- 1017-1050: Guerau I de Cabrera
- 1050-1105: Ponç I de Cabrera
- 1105-1132: Guerau II de Cabrera
- 1132-1162: Ponç II de Cabrera
- 1162-1180: Guerau III de Cabrera
- 1180-1199: Ponç III de Cabrera
- 1199-1229: Guerau IV de Cabrera
- 1229-1242: Guerau V de Cabrera
- 1242-1278: Guerau VI de Cabrera
- 1278-1328: Marquesa de Cabrera
- 1328-1332: Bernat I de Cabrera
- 1332-1343: Bernat II de Cabrera
- 1343-1349: Ponç IV de Cabrera
- 1349-1350: Bernat II de Cabrera
- 1350-1358: Bernat III de Cabrera
- 1373-1423: Bernat IV de Cabrera
- 1423-1466: Bernat V de Cabrera
- 1466-1474: Joan I de Cabrera
- 1474-1477: Joan II de Cabrera
- 1477-1526: Anna I de Cabrera

....

- Enríquez de Cabrera nephew of the former
- Luis Enríquez de Cabrera

== See also ==
- Viscounty of Cabrera
- County of Urgell
