= Ermengol VI =

12th-century Catalonian nobleman

The territories of Ermengol VI after the death of Ramon Berenguer III in 1131, highlighted in brown

Ermengol or Armengol VI (1096 – 1154), called el de Castilla ("the one from Castile"), was the count of Urgell from 1102 until his death. He was the son and successor of Ermengol V and María Pérez, daughter of Count Pedro Ansúrez, Lord of Valladolid, who became the young Ermengol's tutor when he was orphaned in 1102.

== Life ==
Ermengol VI was born in 1096 in Valladolid, whence his nickname comes. During his minority, he was under the regency of his grandfather, Pedro Ansúrez, but the real power lay in the hands of Guerau II of Cabrera and Raymond Berenguer III of Barcelona. With their help, the young count conquered Balaguer in 1105 and made it his capital.

Ermengol collaborated with Alfonso the Battler in the 1118 capture of Zaragoza and in the expedition of Alfonso VII the Emperor, for whom he served as mayordomo mayor, against Almería in 1147. In 1146, he was one of the commanders of Alfonso's army at the battle of Albacete. In 1133, Ermengol ceded Andorra to the Bishop of Urgell. He had good relations with the House of Barcelona and he accompanied Raymond Berenguer IV to Provence in 1144. In 1149, he assisted Raymond Berenguer in the conquest and repopulation of Lleida, receiving one-third of the city, which was thenceforward part of his dominion.

He was a patron of several religious establishments, including Solsona Cathedral as well as the Monastery of Santa María de Retuerta in Valladolid, which had been founded by his father-in-law, Pedro Ansúrez.

On 24 March 1144, Count Ermengol drafted his will and named several executors, including his wife Elvira and his father-in-law Count Rodrigo González de Lara. Even though he asked to be buried at Solsona Cathedral, when he died in the Kingdom of Castile on 20 June 1154, he was buried at the Monastery of Santa María de Valbuena, founded by his sister Stephanie, the widow of Fernando García de Hita and Rodrigo González de Lara.

== Marriages and issue ==
Before August 1126, Ermengol married Arsenda de Cabrera, (Note: They appear together on 18 August 1126 making a donation to the Monastery of Santa María de la Seu de Urgell as Ermengaudus [...] Urgellensis comes cum comitissa uxor mea [...] Arsen.) daughter of Guerau II de Cabrera, first Viscount of Àger, and sister of Ponce Giraldo de Cabrera. They divorced and she married as her second husband Galcerán de Sales, son of Arnaldo Iohannis, with whom she had a son, also named Galcerán de Sales, who died with his half-brother Ermengol VII. Ermengol and Arsenda were the parents of: (Note: Although in some genealogies they appear as the parents of Áurea or Oria, the co-founder of Casbas Monastery and wife of Arnau Mir, count of de Pallars Jussà, she was the daughter of Bernat de Entenza.)

- Ermengol VII, who succeeded his father as Count of Urgell.

Ermengol VI married a second time, before September 1135, (Note: On 7 September 1135 they appear together making a donation to the Colegiata de Santa María la Mayor (Valladolid) as ego Ermengaudus Urgelensis comes una cum conjuge mea Elvira Rodrigues) to Elvira Rodríguez, daughter of Count Rodrigo González de Lara and Sancha of Castile, a legitimate daughter of King Alfonso VI of León. To this union were born:

- María, better known as Maria de Almenara, lady of Miranda de Ebro, Almenara and Palazuelos de la Sierra, the wife of Lope López de Vizcaya, a natural son of Count Lope Díaz I de Haro. (Note: María and her husband Lope were the parents of a son, Ermengol (before 1172 – after 1123), known as Ermengaudo sine terra, who is mentioned in the last will of his uncle Ermengol VII.) María was buried at the Abbey of Santa María la Real de Las Huelgas.
- Isabel de Urgell – in 1152, Ermengol and his wife Elvira negotiated the marriage of this daughter with Ramon Folc III of Cardona.

== Bibliography ==
- Ascaso Sarvisé, Lourdes (1986). El Monasterio Cisterciense de Santa María de Casbas (1173-1350) (PDF) (in Spanish). Zaragoza: Instituto de Estudios Altoaragoneses. ISBN 8439867735.
- Bach Riu, Antoni; Sarobe i Huesca, Ramon (2002). Diplomatari de l'Arxiu Diocesà de Solsona (1101-1200) (PDF) (in Catalan). Vol. I. Barcelona: Fundació Noguera. ISBN 84-7935-957-9. Archived from the original (PDF) on 2016-03-05.
- Bueno Salinas, Santiago; Pérez-Madrid, Francisca (2015). "Religion and the Secular State in Andorra" (PDF). International Center for Law and Religion Studies: 58.
- Consejo Díez, María Luisa (1999). El arte mudéjar en Burgos y su provincia, Doctoral (PDF) (Tesis doctoral) (in Spanish). Madrid: Universidad Complutense de Madrid, Dept. de Historia del Arte I (Medieval), Facultad de Geografía e Historia.
- Fernández-Xesta y Vázquez, Ernesto (2001). Relaciones del condado de Urgel con Castilla y León (in Spanish). E&P Libros Antiguos, S.L. ISBN 84-87860-37-0.
- García de Cortazar y Ruiz de Aguirre, José Ángel (2003). Monasterios románicos y producción artística (in Spanish). Aguilar de Campoo: Fundación Santa María la Real, Centro de Estudios del Románico. ISBN 8489483884.
- Lipskey, Glenn Edward (1972). The Chronicle of Alfonso the Emperor: A Translation of the Chronica Adefonsi imperatoris, with Study and Notes (PhD dissertation). Northwestern University.
- McCrank, Lawrence J. (2003). "County of Urgell". In Gerli, E. Michael (ed.). Medieval Iberia: An Encyclopedia. Routledge.
- Rábade Obradó, Mª del Pilar; Ramírez Vaquero, Mª del Pilar; Utrilla Utrilla, Juan Fernando (2005). La dinámica política (in Spanish). Madrid: Ediciones Istmo, Colección Fundamentos no. 183, Seria Historia de España. ISBN 84-7090-433-7.
- Rodríguez Bernal, Francesc (2009). Els vescomtes de Cardona al segle XII (in Catalan). Lleida: Institut d'Estudis Ilerdencs. ISBN 978-8484093343.
- Ruiz-Domènec, J.E. (1995). "Oria, Condesa de Pallars: una dama catalana del siglo XII". Medievalia. Revista d'Estudis Medievals (in Catalan). 12: 7–12. Archived from the original on 2017-03-12.
- Torres Sevilla-Quiñones de León, Margarita Cecilia (1999). Linajes nobiliarios de León y Castilla: Siglos IX-XIII (in Spanish). Salamanca: Junta de Castilla y León, Consejería de educación y cultura. ISBN 84-7846-781-5.
- Vallejo Penedo, OSA, Juan José (2003). "La formación de un dominio eclesiástico: El Monasterio de Santa María de la Vid (Siglos XII–XIII)" (PDF). Religión y Cultura (in Spanish) (XLIX). Agustinos: 789–838. ISSN 0212-5838. Archived from the original (PDF) on 2014-02-19.

Preceded by Ermengol V	Count of Urgell; 1102–1154	Succeeded by Ermengol VII
