= Ermengol V =

11th-century Catalonian nobleman

Ermengol or Armengol V (1078–1102), called El de Mollerussa ("He of Mollerussa"), was the count of Urgell from 1092 to his death. He was the son of Ermengol IV and his first wife, Lucy (Lucía) of Pallars.

Ermengol was a minor of thirteen when he succeeded his father. A single coin find suggests that he was under the regency of Count Roger II of Foix until he came of age in 1094 or 1095. He spent most of his life in Castile, where he met and married María Pérez, daughter of Pedro Ansúrez, lord of Valladolid, in 1095. During his long absences in Castile, he left the government of Urgell to Guerau II of Cabrera. He died in 1102 at the Battle of Mollerussa.

His children were:

- Ermengol VI, Count of Urgell
- Stephanie (died 1143), first married, probably as early as 1119, Fernando García de Hita, founder of the Castro family, as his second wife. After Fernando died around 1125, Stephanie married Count Rodrigo González de Lara in 1135. In 1143, Stephanie founded the Monastery of Saint Mary of Valbuena.

== Sources ==
- Barton, Simon (2011). "Las mujeres nobles y el poder en los reinos de León y Castilla en el siglo XII: un estudio preliminar". Studia histórica. Historia Medieval (in Spanish) (29). Salamanca: Universidad de Salamanca: 51–71. ISSN 0213-2060.
- Barton, Simon (1997). The Aristocracy in Twelfth-Century León and Castile. Cambridge: Cambridge University Press.
- Crusafont i Sabater, Miquel (2001). "Mancús d'Urgell o mancús de Foix?". Acta Numismàtica. 31: 85–95.
- Crusafont, Miquel; Balaguer, Anna M.; Grierson, Philip (2013). Medieval European Coinage, 6: The Iberian Peninsula. Cambridge University Press.
- Fernández-Xesta y Vázquez, Ernesto (2001). Relaciones del condado de Urgel con Castilla y León (in Spanish). Madrid: E&P Libros Antiguos, S.L. ISBN 84-87860-37-0.
- Torres Sevilla-Quiñones de León, Margarita Cecilia (1999). Linajes nobiliarios de León y Castilla: Siglos IX-XIII (in Spanish). Salamanca: Junta de Castilla y León, Consejería de educación y cultura. ISBN 84-7846-781-5.

Preceded by Ermengol IV	Count of Urgell; 1092–1102	Succeeded by Ermengol VI
