= Ermengol X =

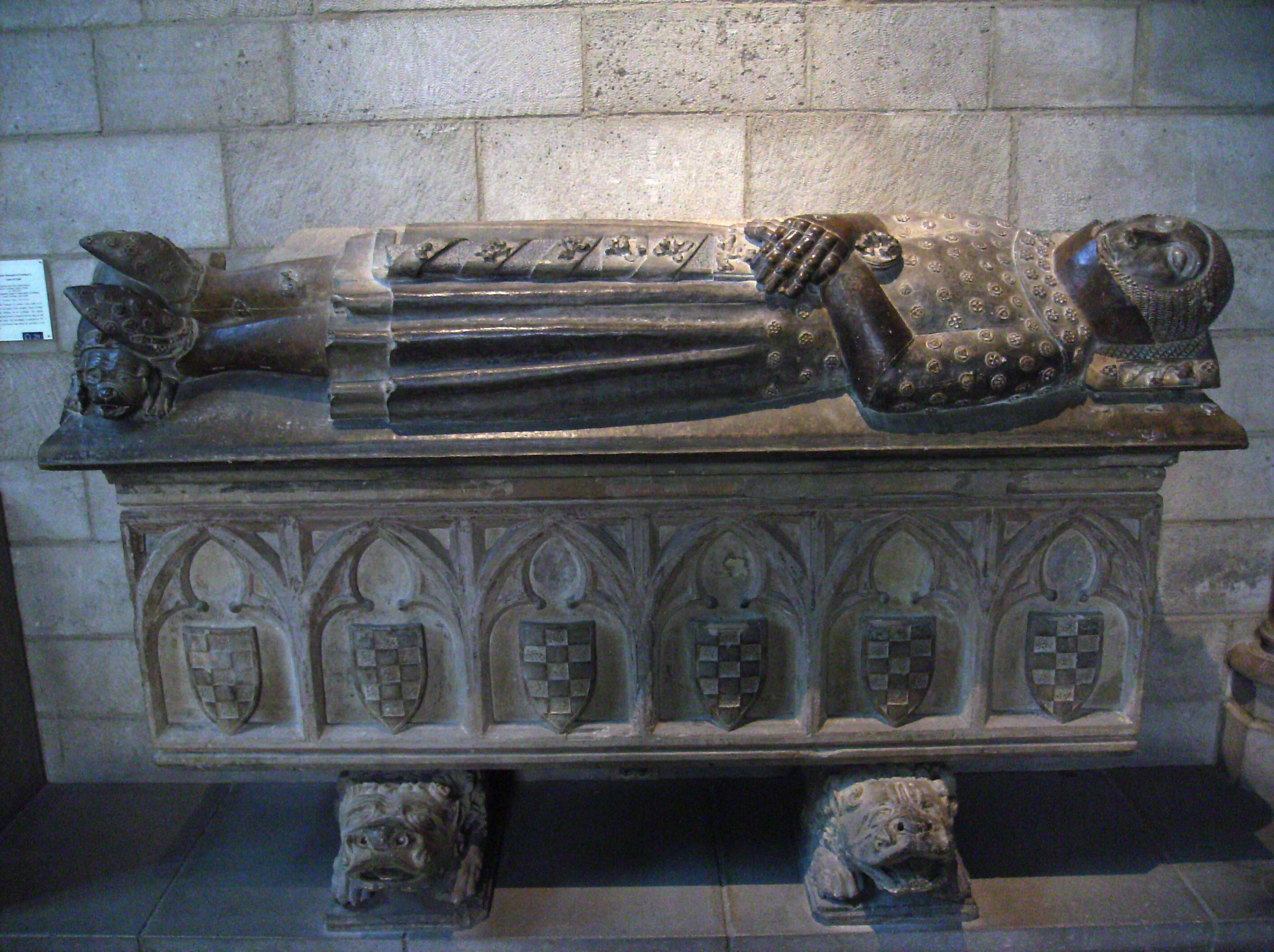
Sepulchre of Ermengol X at The Cloisters, New York City

Ermengol X (1261–1314) was the Count of Urgel and Viscount of Àger from 1268 to 1314. He was the son of Álvaro of Urgell and his second wife, Cecilia, daughter of Roger-Bernard II of Foix.

Ermengol inherited Urgel at the age of fourteen upon the death of his father. He was originally under the regency of Roger-Bernard III of Foix. However, the relatives of the house of Montcada of Béarn, of his father's first wife, Constance, opposed his succession.

At the instigation of the house of Foix, Ermengol participated in the coalition of rebels against Peter III of Aragon in 1276, but in the succeeding two years he recovered all the territory of his county which had unto then been in the hands of his rivals: the Montcada, the king of Aragon, or the viscount of Cardona. In 1278, he met the king at Agramunt and received Urgel as a fief.

Ermengol attached himself thereafter to Peter's entourage, travelling with the king to Sicily in 1282 and Bordeaux in 1283. When Peter died in 1295, Ermengol became a close companion and adviser of his sons Alfonso III, whom he aided in conquering the Kingdom of Majorca in 1287, and James II.

Before dying at Camporrells without descendants, he named the second son of James II, Alfonso, as his heir on the condition that he should marry his grandniece, Teresa de Entença, his legal heir. With his death, the House of Cabrera came to an end.

In his will, Ermengol donated funds to be used for the foundation of the Convento de Predicadores de Balaguer.

| Preceded by Álvaro | Count of Urgel; 1268–1314 | Succeeded by Theresa |
