= Ermengol VII =

12th-century Catalonian nobleman

Ermengol or Armengol VII (died 1184) was the count of Urgell from 1154 until his death. He was called el de Valencia ("the one from Valencia").

The son of Ermengol VI and his first wife, Arsenda of Cabrera, Ermengol VII inherited his father's titles upon the death of Ermengol VI in 1154. In 1157, Ermengol VII married Dulce, daughter of Roger III of Foix and Jimena de Osona, who acted as his regent during his absences in Castile. Without any possibility of expansion into surrounding territory, Ermengol was attracted to the Castilian possessions that he inherited from his grandmother. Thus, a major part of his reign was spent in the vassalage of Ferdinand II of León, to whom he was majordomo and tenant of many castles in Extremadura.

Around 1166, he founded the canons of Bellpuig de les Avellanes. In 1163, he granted a charter to the people of Agramunt and in 1174 to Balaguer. In 1164, he coined his own comital currency in Agramunt.

Ermengol VII died at Requena in 1184 and left Urgell to his son Ermengol VIII. He also left a daughter, Marquesa, who married Ponç III of Cabrera in 1194.

Preceded by Ermengol VI	Count of Urgell; 1154–1184	Succeeded by Ermengol VIII
