= Counts of Urgell =

Coat of arms of the County of Urgell

This is a list of the counts of Urgell, a county of the Principality of Catalonia in the 10th through 13th centuries.

== c. 798–870 Counts appointed by the Carolingians ==
- 798–820 Borrell, count of Urgell and Cerdanya
- 820–824 Aznar Galíndez I, count of Aragon, was given Borrell's counties while he was exiled from Aragon
- 824–834 Galindo Aznárez I
- 834–848 Sunifred I
- 848–870 Solomon (or Miró)

== 870–992 Counts from the House of Barcelona ==
- 870–897 Wilfred the Hairy, count of Barcelona, Girona-Osona and Urgell-Cerdanya
- 898–948 Sunifred II
- 948–966 Miro, born c. 940
- 966–30 September 992 Borrell II, count of Barcelona, Girona, Osona

== 992–1213 Counts from the House of Barcelona-Urgell ==
- 992 – 1 September 1010 Ermengol I el de Còrdova ("of Cordoba"), born 975, killed in battle at Córdoba in 1010
- 1010–1038 Ermengol II el Peregrí ("the Pilgrim"), born 1009, died on pilgrimage to Jerusalem, 1038
- 1038–1065 Ermengol III el de Barbastre ("of Barbastro"), born c. 1033, killed at Barbastro in February or March 1065
- 1065–11 March 1092 Ermengol IV el de Gerp ("of Gerp"), born c. 1056
- 1092–1102 Ermengol V el de Mollerussa ("of Mollerussa"), born 1078/1079, died in the Battle of Mollerussa
- 1102–1153/1154 Ermengol VI el de Castella ("of Castile"), born 1096
- 1153/1154–1184 Ermengol VII el de València ("of Valencia")
- 1184–1208/1209 Ermengol VIII el de Sant Hilari ("of Sant Hilari")
- 1208/1209–1213 Aurembiaix (first time) under regency of Peter II of Aragon

== 1213–1228 Counts from the House of Cabrera ==
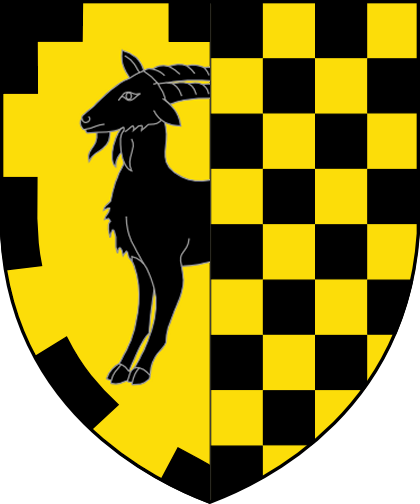
Cabrera-Urgell coat of arms

- 1213–1228 Guerau I of Urgell, IV of Cabrera (usurper)

== 1228–1236 Counts from the House of Barcelona-Urgell ==
- 1228–1231 Countess Aurembiaix (second time),
  - from 1229 with her husband, Peter I. She died in 1231.
- 1231–1236 King James I of Aragon

== 1236–1314 Counts from the House of Cabrera ==
- 1236–1243 Ponç I (Ponç IV of Cabrera)
- 1243 Ermengol IX son of previous.
- 1243–1268 Álvaro el Castellà ("the Castilian") brother of previous.
- 1268–1314 Ermengol X son of previous.

== 1314–1413 Counts from the House of Barcelona ==
- 10 November 1314 – 1327 King Alfonso IV of Aragon, died 1336, Married Teresa de Entença, who was the grandniece and legal heir of Ermengol X, Count of Urgell.
- 1327–1347 James I of Urgell, Prince of Aragon, born 1321, poisoned in Barcelona in 1347
- 1347–1408 Peter II of Urgell, born 1340, died at Balaguer, 1408
- 1408–31 October 1413 James II of Urgell. When Martin I of Aragon died, James was a candidate to the crown, but the Compromise of Caspe preferred Ferdinand of Antequera. James revolted, and on 31 October 1413, surrendered to the king. The county of Urgell was dissolved and count James died in jail in the castle of Xàtiva on 1 June 1433.

== See also ==
- County of Urgell
- House of Cabrera
