= Sant Alís =

Mountain in Spain

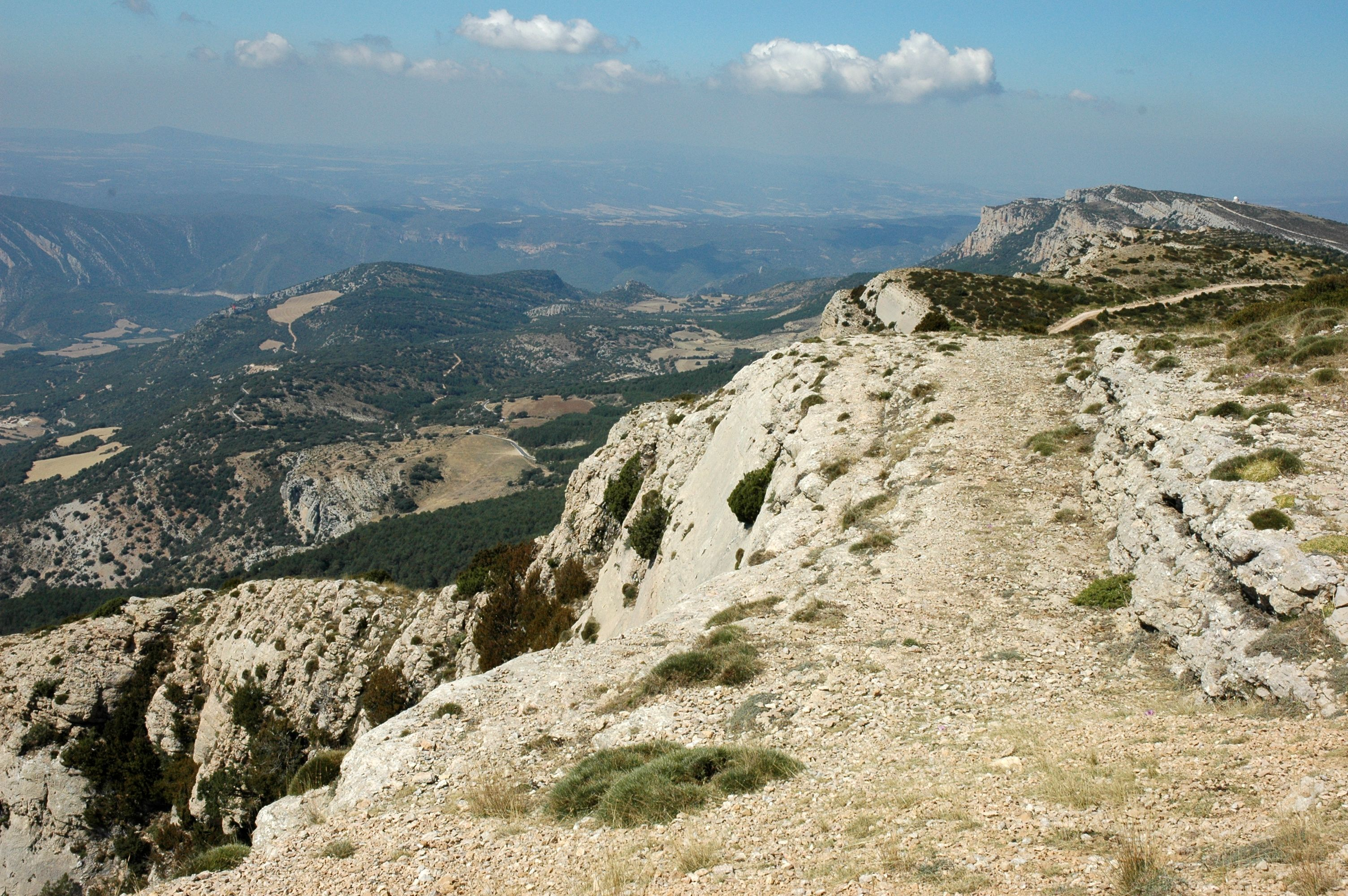

Highest point
- Elevation: 1,675 m (5,495 ft)
- Coordinates: 42°2′23.24″N 0°45′59.70″E

Geography
- Location: Pre-Pyrenees, Catalonia
- Parent range: Serra del Montsec

Geology
- Mountain type: Calcareous

Climbing
- Easiest route: From Àger

Sant Alís is the highest mountain of Montsec d'Ares, the central part of the Serra del Montsec in Catalonia, Spain. It has an elevation of 1,675 metres above sea level.

== See also ==
- Mountains of Catalonia
