= Arnau Mir de Tost =

11th-century Catalan knight

Arnau Mir de Tost (c. 1000 – after 1072) was a Catalan nobleman of Urgell, the lord of Llordà and viscount of Àger, and a major figure of the 11th-century Reconquista in Catalonia. Arnau is sometimes praised as the "El Cid of the Lands of Lleida" for his foundational role in reestablishing Christian rule in the region to the south of Urgell.

Arnau was born at Tost shortly after the year 1000. His father died when he was still young and he became attached to the court of Count Ermengol II. In 1031 he married Arsenda (or Ersenda) and purchased from the count the rights to the castle of Llordà, on the frontier with the Caliphate of Córdoba. From his base at Llordà he began a career of conquest in the aftermath of the breakup of the caliphate into numerous petty ṭawā'if. He conquered the Conca Dellà and brought the frontier of Urgell up to the mountainous region of Montsec. His crowning achievement was to seize the mighty qaṣabah (Arabic: قصبة) of Ajīra (Àger) in 1034, the key fortress in the Andalusi line of defence (the Tagr) against Urgell, which he successfully took by storm twice.

Ermengol promptly enfeoffed Arnau as lord of Àger and charged him with the repopulation of the devastated territory between the Christian and Muslim frontiers. To this end Arnau issued charters specifying the terms of colonisation; Montsec became the centre of a new Christian principality in the south of Urgell. For his primitive chancery Arnau employed an efficient scribe named Vidal, who brought the convenientia (convention) into common practice in western Catalonia, especially through the work he did drawing up conventions on behalf of Raymond IV of Pallars Jussà, the husband of Arnau's daughter Valença. Arnau had extended his influence into Pallars Jussà through this matrimonial alliance (1055), at which time Raymond had pledged him four castles as insurance against his breaking his marriage vows.

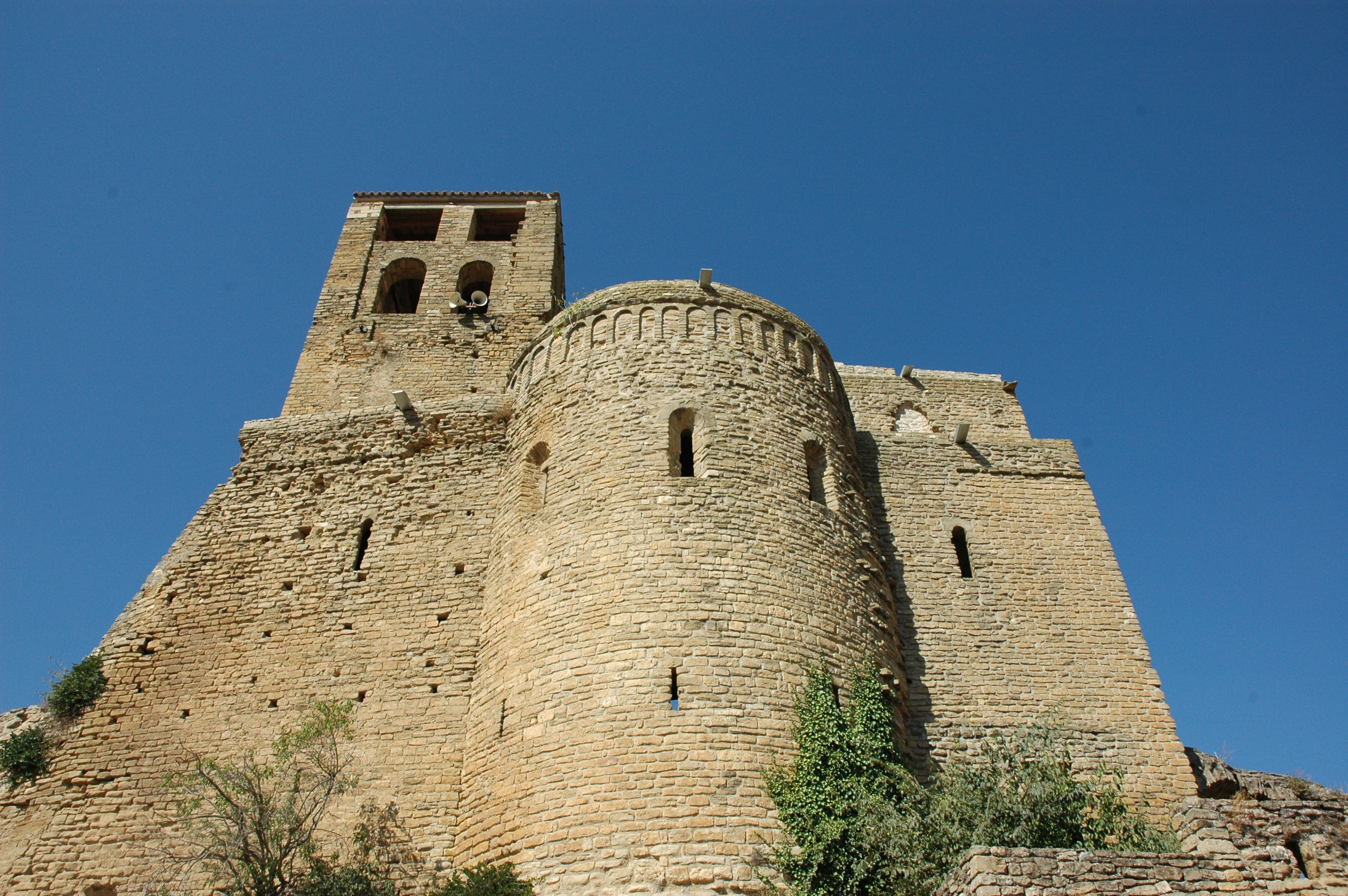
The castle-monastery of Saint Peter, founded in the mid-11th century by Arnau near Àger.

Arnau controlled over thirty castles and numerous other agricultural settlements at the height of his power, justifying his assumption of the titles of viscount and comtor. He built a fortified monastery, Sant Pere d'Àger, which still stands on a hill overlooking Àger.

In 1043–1044, Arnau became a hostage on behalf of his suzerain Ermengol III for 4,000 solidi to Raymond Berengar I of Barcelona, as insurance against Ermengol and Raymond Berengar's alliance against Raymond of Cerdanya. Arnau also fought for Raymond Berengar, conquering Camarasa and Cubells in his name. As early as 1050 he had extracted from Raymond Berengar a promise not to demand statica (right of lodging) from him. At the same time he was extracting other concessions out of Ermengol III, diminishing the comital rights (potestas, "power") over his castles.

Arnau was a major proponent of the Crusade of Barbastro in 1064. On 17 April 1066 Ermengol III, who had been given the lordship of Barbastro after the success of the crusade, died defending it from the Muslims and Arnau took over the regency of Urgell for the young Ermengol IV.

In 1072 Arnau went on a pilgrimage to Santiago de Compostela. Upon his return he dictated his testament, which is preserved. It contains the second mention of a set of ninety-six rock crystal chess pieces called the "Urgell (or Àger) chessmen". Their earliest mention is in the 1068 will of Arnau's wife Arsenda. They are crafted in an abstract Islamic design, implying that they were originally from south of the frontier. On his deathbed he is said to have expressed regret that he had not enough time to conquer Balaguer and Lleida. A small monument has been erected to Arnau at Foradada near Montsonís.

== Sources ==
- Calvo, Ricardo. "The Oldest Chess Pieces in Europe." December 2001.
- Fernández, Jaume. "Arnau Mir de Tost: El Cid de les Terres de Lleida." Personatges (2006), pp. 79–84.
- Kosto, Adam J. Making Agreements in Medieval Catalonia: Power, order, and the written word, 1000–1200. Cambridge: Cambridge University Press, 2001. ISBN 0-521-79239-8.
