= Sub-Pyrenees =

Mountainous region of Catalonia, Spain

Coordinates: 42°6′5″N 2°17′37″E

The Sub-Pyrenees (Catalan: Subpirineu) are a mountainous region in Catalonia, Spain, forming a section of the southern foothills of the Pyrenees. They are located at the eastern end of the Pre-Pyrenees, west of the Catalan Transversal Range, between the lower Ripollès and an area of the high Garrotxa.

Geographic map of Catalonia displaying the main morphologic features according to the Great Catalan Encyclopedia

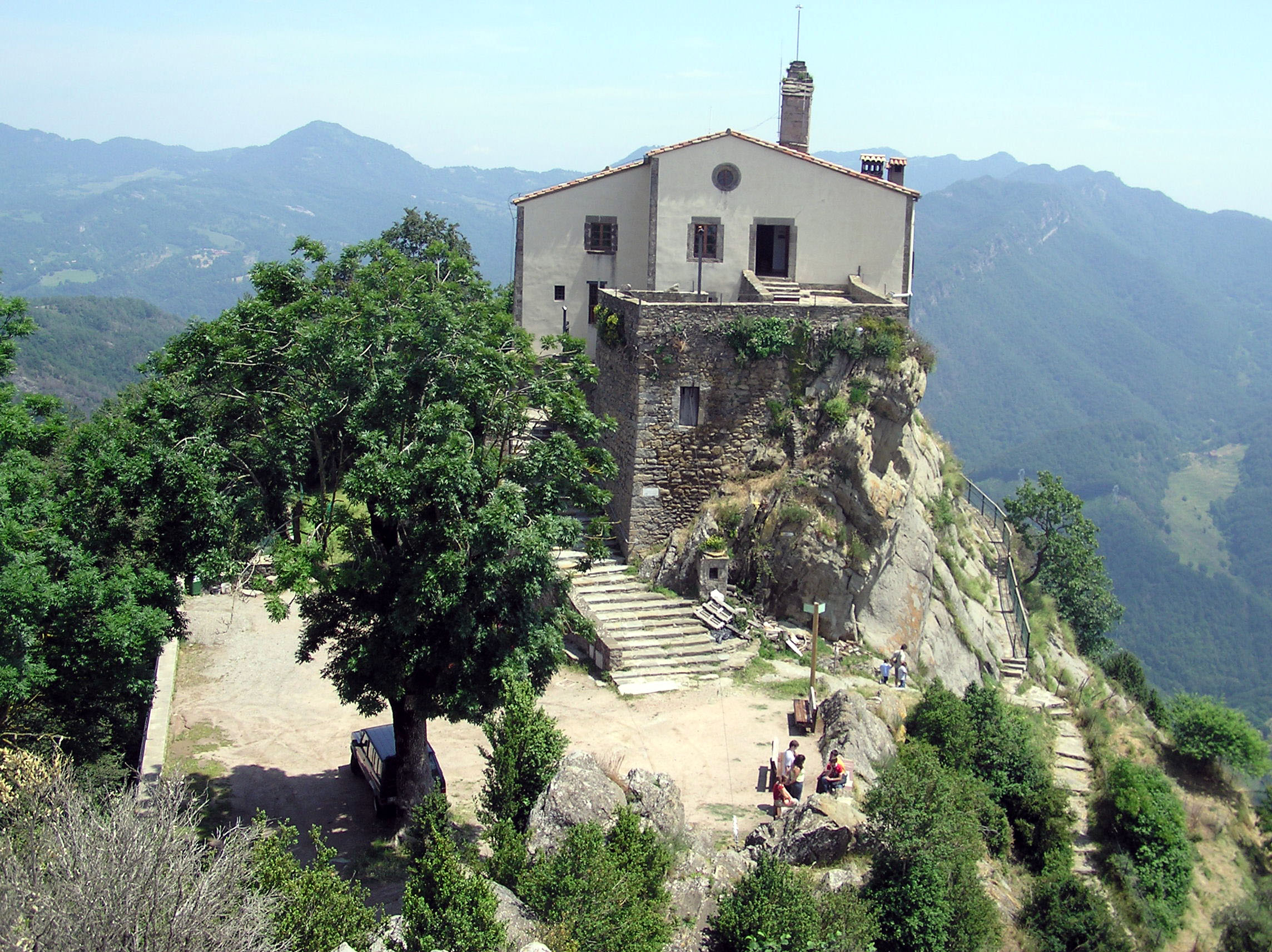
Nostra Senyora de Bellmunt chapel on the mountains close to Sant Pere de Torelló in the Sub-Pyrenees area

== Description ==
The Sub-Pyrenees consist of a series of parallel mountain ranges aligned in an east-west direction. Their shape is smooth and they are mostly covered with forest. They are cut transversally by the Ter River, between the Sant Amand (1,851 m) anticline and Bellmunt (1,515 m), the mountain massif rising over the Plain of Vic.

The term Subpirineu was first used in 1938 by Catalan geographer and geologist Lluís Solé. He justified the separateness of the Sub-Pyrenees from the Pre-Pyrenees and the Transversal Range on the basis of the material composition of the mountains, as well as the relatively more recent character of the anticline and the evidence of fractures. The name "Sub-Pyrenees" was systematically accepted in the 1958 work Geografia de Catalunya.

== See also ==
- Geology of the Pyrenees
- Pre-Pyrenees
- Catalan Transversal Range
