= Santuari de Bellmunt =

Sanctuary in Sant Pere de Torelló, Spain

Coordinates: 42°6′6.55″N 2°17′40.63″E

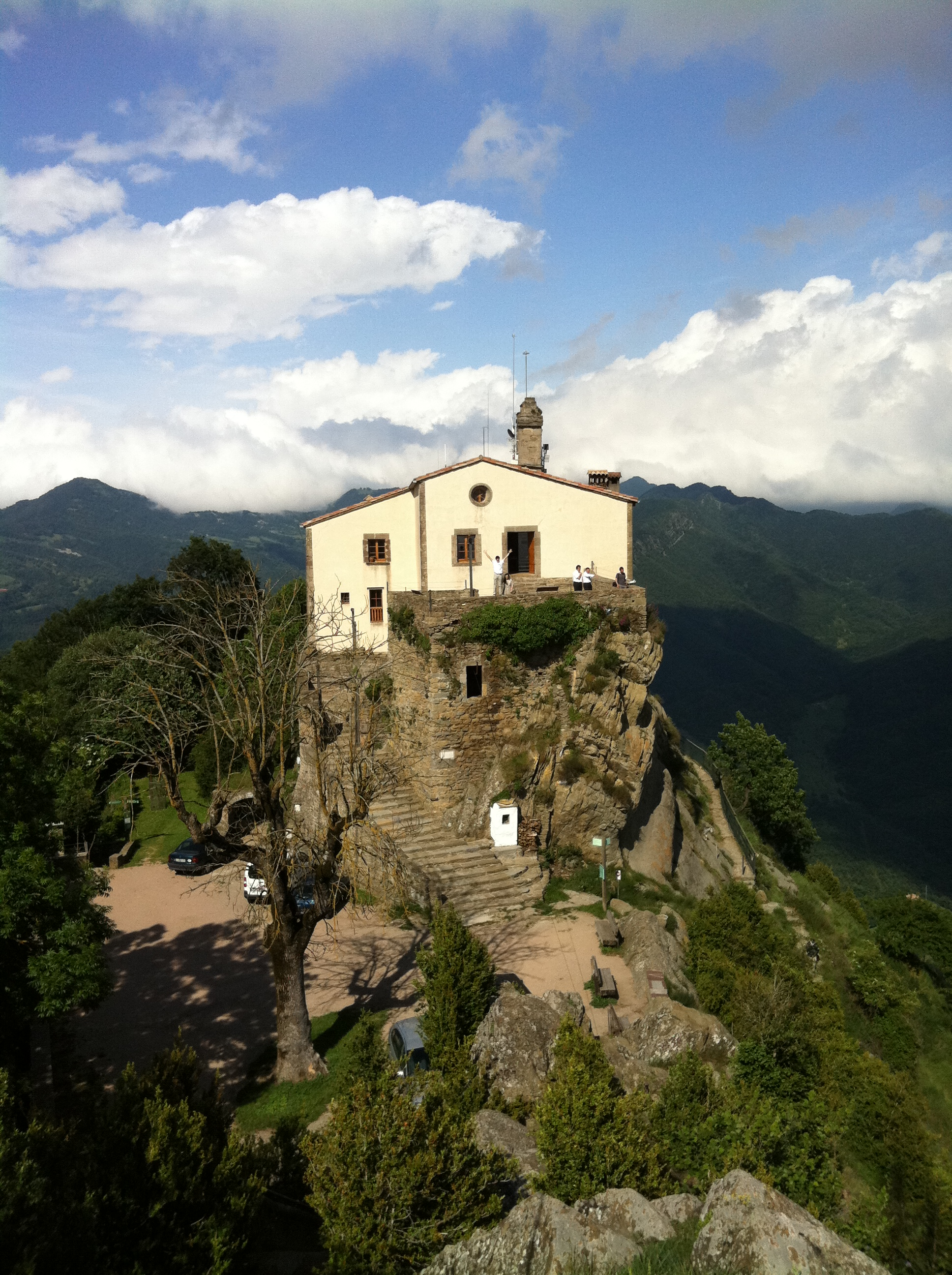
General view of the Sanctuary

The Santuari de Bellmunt ('Sanctuary of Bellmunt') is a sanctuary in the municipality of Sant Pere de Torelló (Osona), which is located on top of the Serra of Bellmunt at 1246 m altitude. There is a viewpoint from where visitors can see the plain of Vic, the Pyrénées, the Ges Valley, and Bisaura. Along the sanctuary is a refuge and a restaurant, all built on the rock. It can be accessed on foot or by car from Sant Pere de Torelló, and from Vidrà only on foot. The image of the Lady of Bellmunt is a 22 cm painted statue of Alabaster.
