= Ermengol III =

11th-century Catalonian nobleman

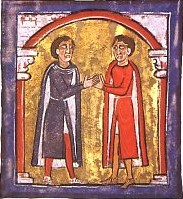
Ermengol with his cousin, Ramon Berenguer I, Count of Barcelona

Ermengol or Armengol III (1032 – 1065), called el de Barbastro, was the Count of Urgell from 1038 to his death. He was the son of Ermengol II, Count of Urgell and his wife Velasquita "Constança", probably the daughter of Bernard I, Count of Besalú.

== Life ==
Allied with his contemporary and second cousin Ramon Berenguer I, Count of Barcelona, together they shared in the process of erosion of the comital authority to the noblesse. They also cooperated in the Reconquista and Ermengol received a third of the reconquered territory, occupying, in 1050, Camarasa and Cubells after taking them from Yusuf of Lleida. In 1039 – 1040, Ermengol and Raymond Berenguer signed a pact against Raymond of Cerdanya. Later in that decade, Raymond Berenguer paid 20,000 solidi for Ermengol's support and military aid.

Ermengol took part in the Barbastro War of 1064 under the banner of his brother-in-law Sancho Ramírez of Aragon. When Barbastro was captured, he was given lordship of the city. He died before 12 April 1065 defending the city from Moorish reprisals and was buried at the Monastery of San Pedro de Àger.

== Marriages and issue ==
Ermengol married Adelaide before 1048, who died before 1055 and whose family is not known with certainty, though some scholars have considered her the daughter of Guillem I, Count of Besalú. Ermengol and Adelaide were the parents of two children:

- Ermengol IV, his heir (Note: In a charter dated 1066 – 1076, he appears as Ermengaudum, Urgellensem comitem, filium Adalaidis comitisse (Ermengol, count of Urgell, son of Countess Adelaide), and, in another charter, dated 1069 – 1071, he identifies himself as Ego, Ermengaudus comes Urgelli, filius qui sum comitisse Adalaidis (I, Ermengol count of Urgell, son of Countess Adelaide). In this charter, he swears fealty to his brother-in-law William I, Count of Cerdanya and promises that if he died without issue, the County of Urgell would be inherited by his sister Isabella.)
- Isabella (died c. 1071), in 1062 – 1063 married King Sancho Ramírez of Aragon, who probably repudiated her in 1068, and afterwards became the third wife of William I, Count of Cerdanya.

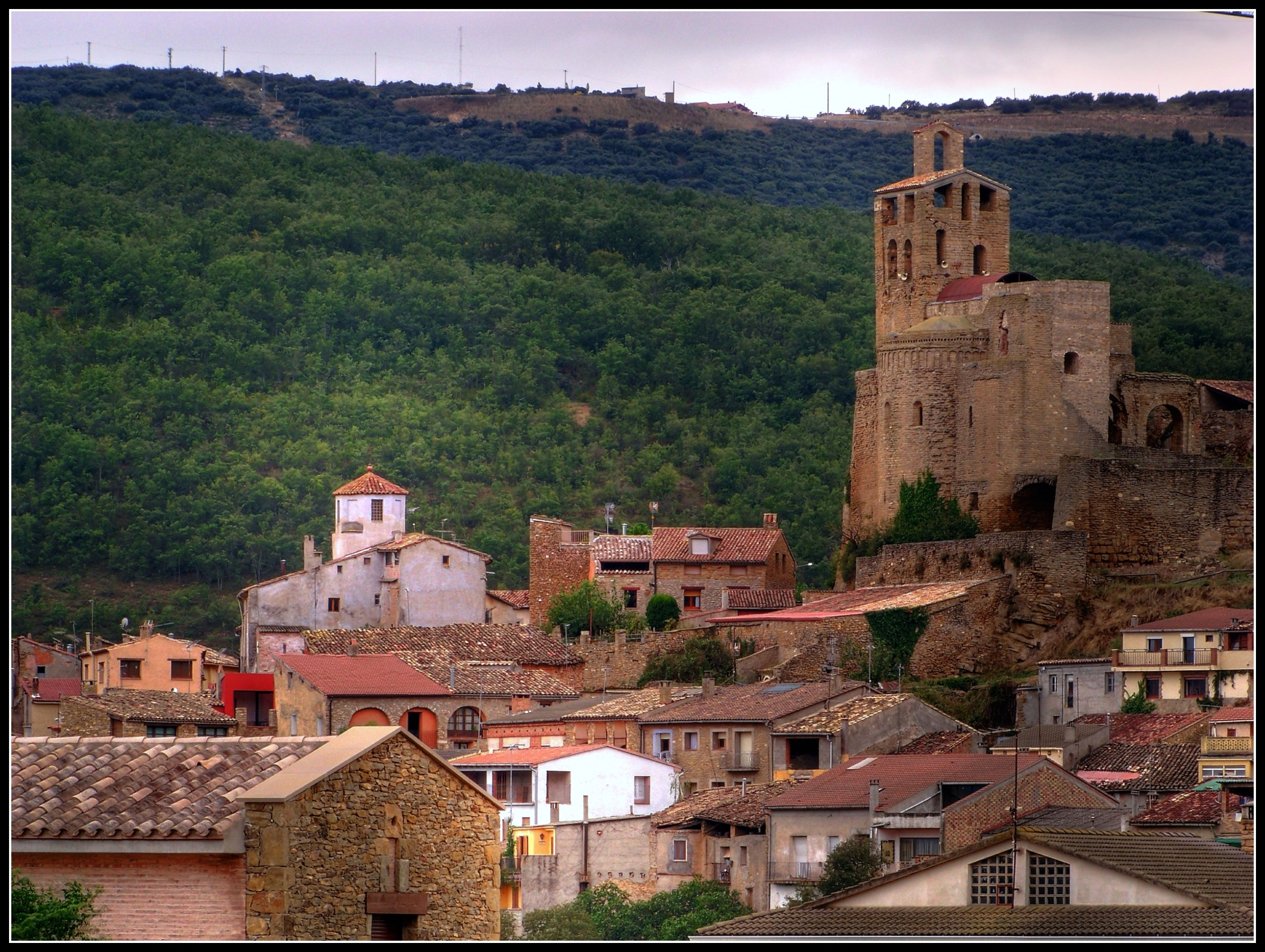
Church of Sant Pere in Àger where Ermengol III was buried

Before 7 May 1055, Ermengol took as his second wife Clemencia, hypothesized to have been the daughter of Berengar Raymond I and his second wife Guisla (based on the names of their younger sons), by whom he had three more sons:

- Berenguer
- Guillem
- Ramon

Clemencia died sometime after 17 October 1059, when she apparently confirmed a charter with her husband, and before 6 November 1062. Ermengol was remarried to a woman named Elvira, who died before 1063.

In 1063, Ermengol married his fourth wife, Sancha, the daughter of Ramiro I of Aragon. (Note: On 12 April 1065, Sancha and her stepson, Ermengol IV, made several donations to the Monastery of San Pedro de Àger, Sancha as the widow of Ermengol III and Ermengol IV as the son of the deceased count. Count Ermengol III died without executing a will and was buried in this monastery.)

Ermengol III died in battle near Monzón and his body was first taken to Barbastro and then to the fortress of Àger where he was buried at the entrance of the Church of San Pedro at the Monastery of San Pedro de Àger.

== Sources ==
- Aurell i Cardona, Martin. "Jalons pour une enquête sur les stratégies matrimoniales des comtes Catalans (IXe-XIe s.)" Symposium internacional, 1991, vol 1, pp 281–364.
- Baiges, Ignasi J.; Feliu, Gaspar; Salrach, Josep M. (2010). Els pergamins de l'Arxiu Comtal de Barcelona, de Ramon Berenguer II a Ramon Berenguer IV (PDF) (in Catalan). Vol. I. (Coord.). Barcelona: Fundació Noguera. ISBN 978-84-9779-958-4.
- Chesé Lapeña, Ramon (2011). Collecció diplomàtica de Sant Pere dÀger fins 1198 (PDF) (in Catalan). Vol. I. Barcelona: Fundació Noguera. ISBN 978-84-9975-117-7.
- Durán Gudiol, Antonio (1993). Ramiro I de Aragón (in Spanish). Zaragoza: Ibercaja. ISBN 84-87007-90-2.
- Fernández-Xesta y Vázquez, Ernesto (2001). Relaciones del condado de Urgel con Castilla y León (in Spanish). Madrid: E&P Libros Antiguos, S.L. ISBN 84-87860-37-0.
- Lapeña Paúl, Ana Isabel (2004). Sancho Ramírez, rey de Aragón (¿1064?-1094) y rey de Navarra (1076-1094) (in Spanish). Gijón: Ediciones Trea. ISBN 84-9704-123-2.
- Lewis, Archibald R. (1965). The Development of Southern French and Catalan Society, 718 – 1050. Austin: University of Texas Press. OCLC 657400975.
- Ponsich, Pierre. "Le Conflent et ses comtes du IXe au XIIe siècle." Etudes Roussillonnaises, 1, 1951, pp 241–344.
- Ubieto Arteta, Antonio. (1987). Creación y desarrollo de la Corona de Aragón (in Spanish). Zaragoza: Anubar. ISBN 84-7013-227-X.

Preceded by Ermengol II	Count of Urgell; 1038–1065	Succeeded by Ermengol IV
