= Cap de Boumort =

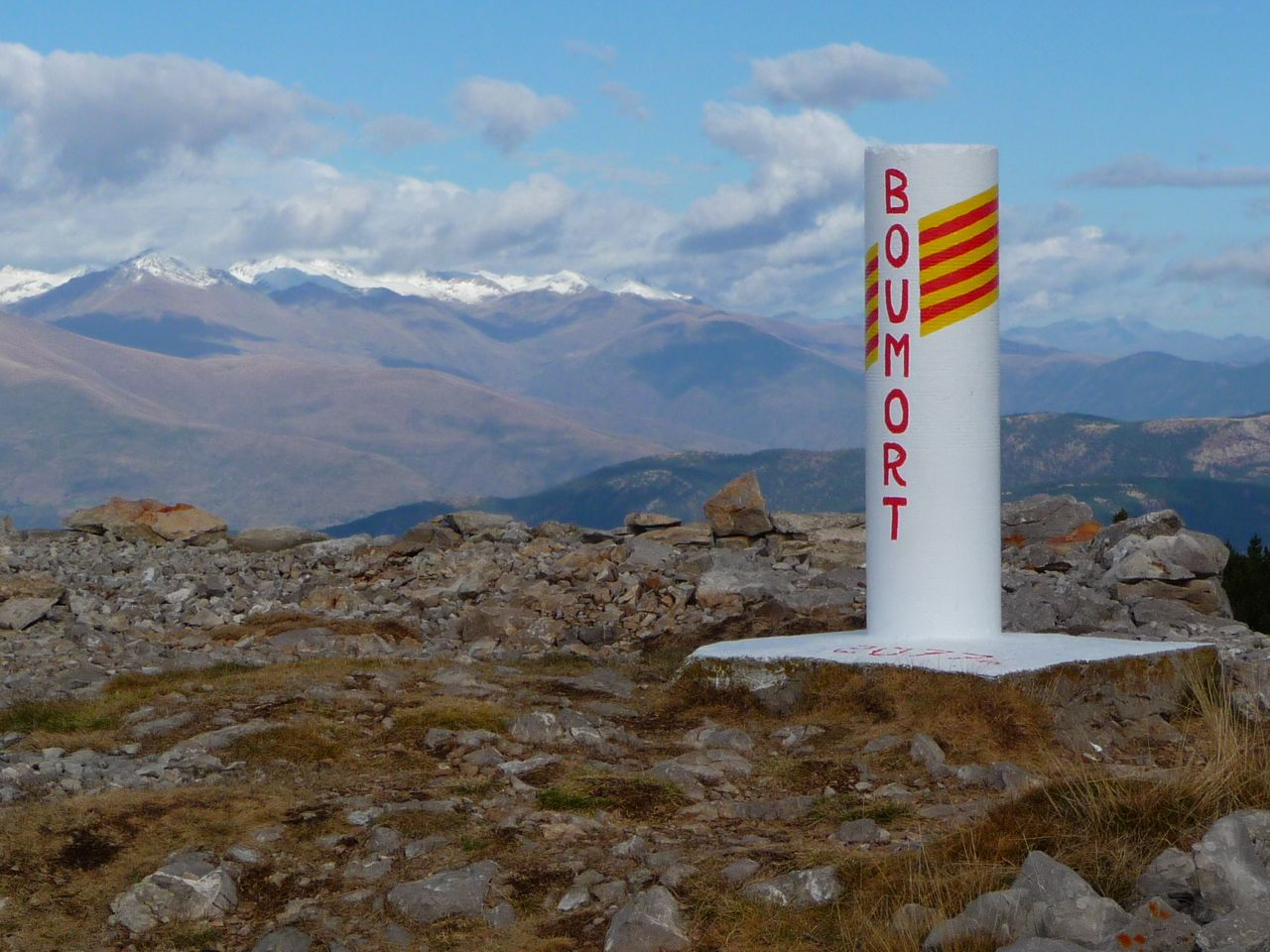
- View from the summit

Highest point
- Elevation: 2,075 m (6,808 ft)
- Coordinates: 42°14′6″N 1°8′5″E

Geography
- Location within Pyrenees
- Location: Catalonia, Spain
- Parent range: Serra de Boumort

Cap de Boumort is a mountain of Catalonia, Spain. It has an elevation of 2,075 metres above sea level.

It is the highest summit of the Serra de Boumort range in the Pre-Pyrenees.

== See also ==
- Mountains of Catalonia
