= Ermengol II =

Count of Urgell (died 1038)

Ermengol II, Count of Urgell
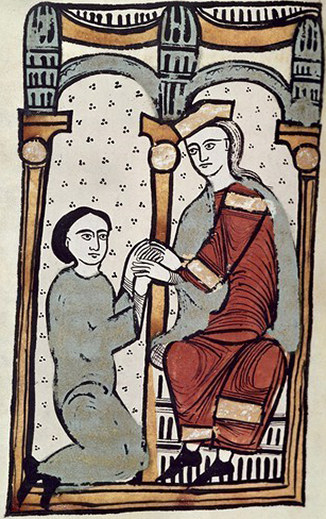
- Ermengol receiving the homage and fealty of Arnau Mir de Tost for the castle of Àger. From the Liber feudorum maior
- Died: 1038; Jerusalem
- Noble family: House of Barcelona
- Spouse: Velasquita of Besalú
- Issue: Ermengol III
- Father: Ermengol I, Count of Urgell
- Mother: Guisla (Gisela)

Ermengol or Armengol II (died 1038), called the Pilgrim, was the count of Urgell from 1011 to his death. He was the son of Ermengol I and his second wife, Guisla. Still a child when he succeeded his father, who was killed in battle against the Moors, he was put under the regency of his uncle Count Ramon Borrell of Barcelona until 1018.

With his uncle's help, Ermengol began a successful war of reconquest to the south, taking Montmagastre, Alòs, Malagastre, Rubió and Artesa. Around 1024 the bishop of Urgell, Ermengol, led the county's feudal knights and armed retinues in the besieging and conquest of the Guissona plain from the Muslims of the Taifa of Zaragoza. Finally, Arnau Mir de Tost occupied the castle of Àger in 1034. The taifa kings of Lleida and Zaragoza also granted lands to him and to the church of Urgell.

Ermengol II married Constança of Besalú, also called Velasquita, before 24 November 1031. She survived until at least 1059 and acted as regent for her son Ermengol III. She may have been the homonymous daughter of Bernard I, Count of Besalú and Countess Tota-Adelaide, named in her father’s will in October 1021.

Ermengol later went on a pilgrimage to the Holy Land and died in 1038 at Jerusalem.

Preceded by Ermengol I	Count of Urgell; 1011–1038	Succeeded by Ermengol III
