= Bellmunt (Sant Pere de Torelló) =

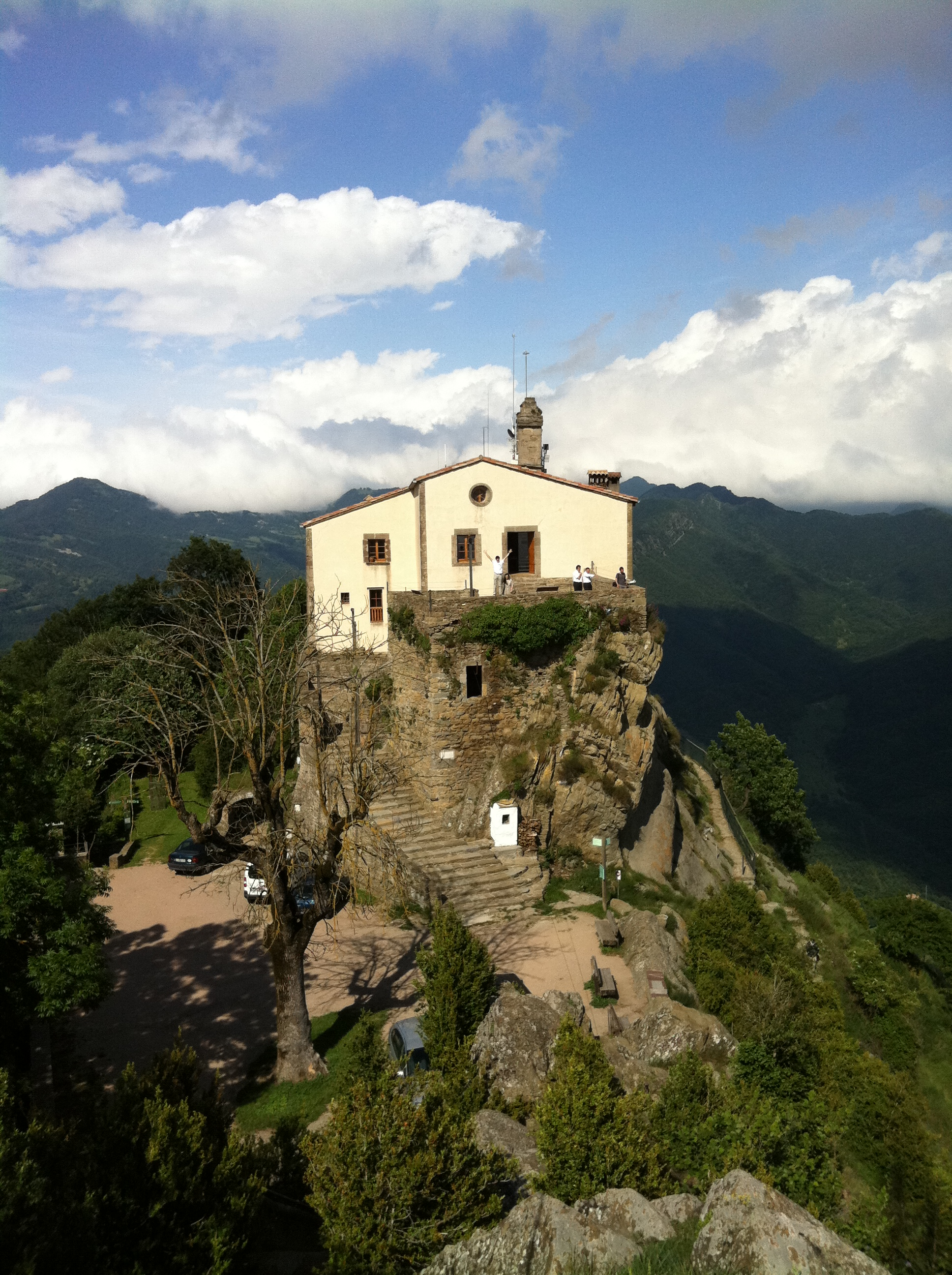
- Nostra Senyora de Bellmunt chapel

Highest point
- Elevation: 1,246 m (4,088 ft)
- Listing: Mountains of Catalonia
- Coordinates: 42°6′5.516″N 2°17′37.48″E

Geography
- Location within Catalonia Location within Spain
- Country: Spain
- Community: Catalonia
- County: Osona
- Parent range: Sub-Pyrenees

Climbing
- Easiest route: From Sant Pere de Torelló

Bellmunt (Sant Pere de Torelló) is a mountain of Catalonia, Spain. It has an elevation of 1,246 metres above sea level. This mountain dominates the landscape of the Plain of Vic.

== See also ==
- Sub-Pyrenees
