= Plain of Vic =

Coordinates: 41°55′52″N 2°15′21″E

Plain of Vic Plana de Vic
- Natural region
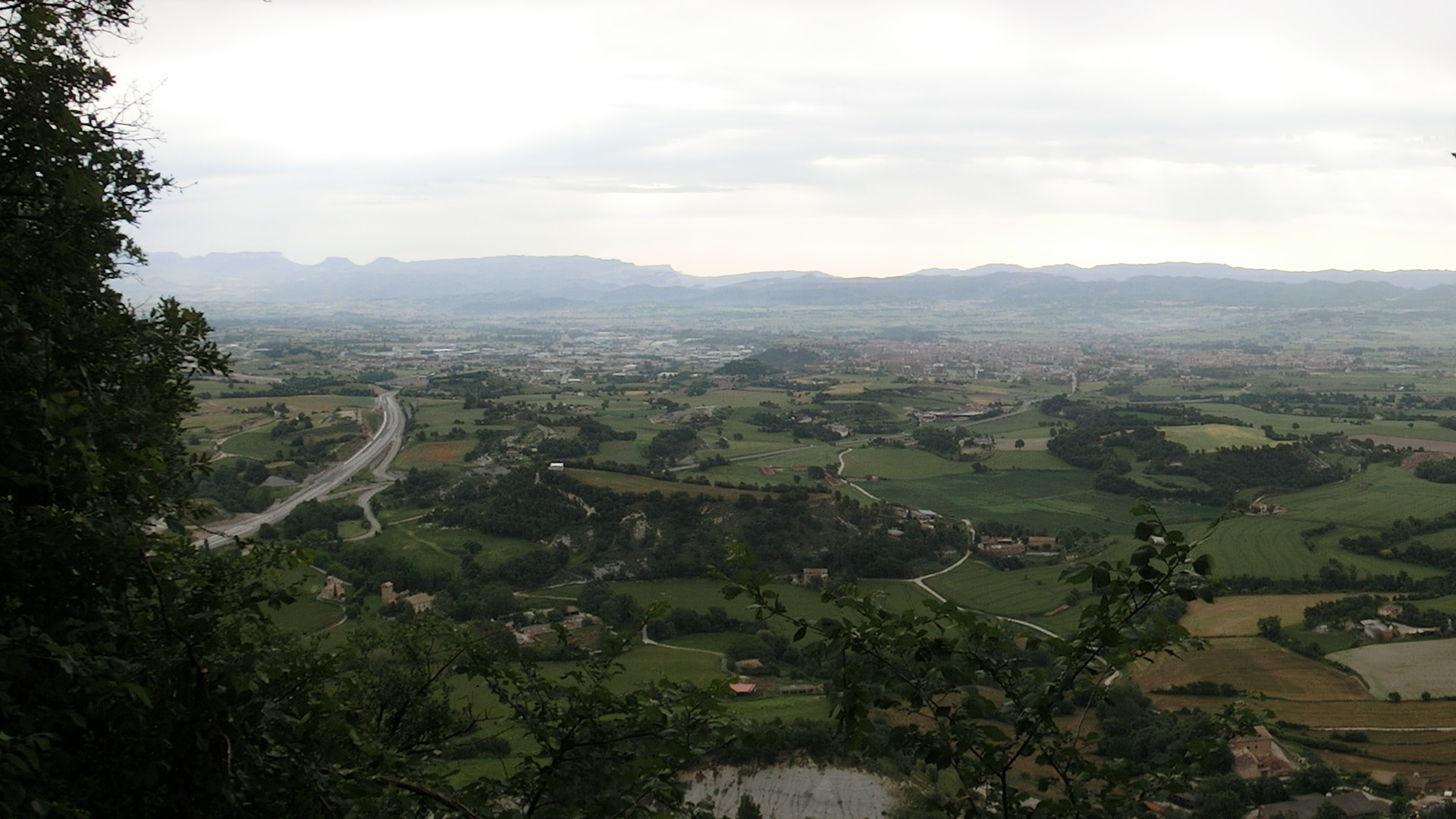
- Landscape of the Plain of Vic.

- A map of Catalonia showing the Plana de Vic location
- Country: Catalonia, Spain
- Elevation: 490 m (1,610 ft)

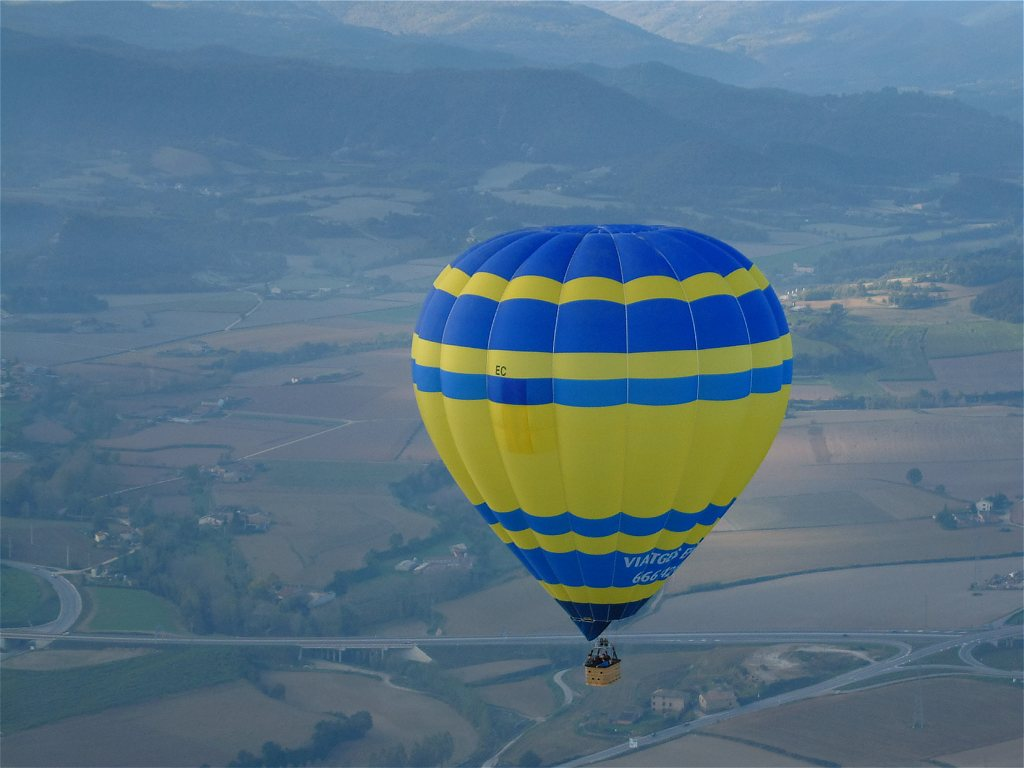
A hot air balloon over the Plain of Vic.

The Plain of Vic (Catalan Plana de Vic) is a 30 km long depression located at the eastern end of the Catalan Central Depression in the Osona comarca. It is named after the town of Vic, an important and ancient urban center in this natural region that lies in the midst of the plain. Other significant towns in the plain are Manlleu and Tona.

This natural depression carved by river Ter and its tributaries is longer than it is wide and stretches in a N / S direction. It is completely surrounded by mountains: The Sub-Pyrenees, with Bellmunt mountain towering in the north, the Lluçanès (Pre-Pyrenees) and Moianès high plateau in the West, the Montseny in the southeast and the Guilleries, located at the apex of the Catalan Transversal Range and the Pre-Coastal Range, in the east.

== Characteristics ==
The Plain of Vic was the bed of an ancient sea. It is mainly formed by sedimentary rocks, like carbonatic lutite, from the eocene. The most remarkable characteristic of the landscape in the plain are low, isolated hills known as turons testimoni, "testimonial hills". Fossils are quite abundant in areas of the Plain of Vic.

The plain is subject to a phenomenon of thermal inversion, especially marked in calm weather days during the fall and the winter, by which the surrounding mountain ranges are often warmer than the plain. This inversion in temperature also reflects in the vegetation. The original vegetation of the plain was oak (Quercus pubescens) forest, but little is left owing to continuous human intervention since ancient times. Some very ancient oaks have been preserved as a tourist attraction.

== See also ==
- Vic
- Tona
- Catalan Central Depression
- Sub-Pyrenees
- Catalan Transversal Range
