= Agulló =

- Locality
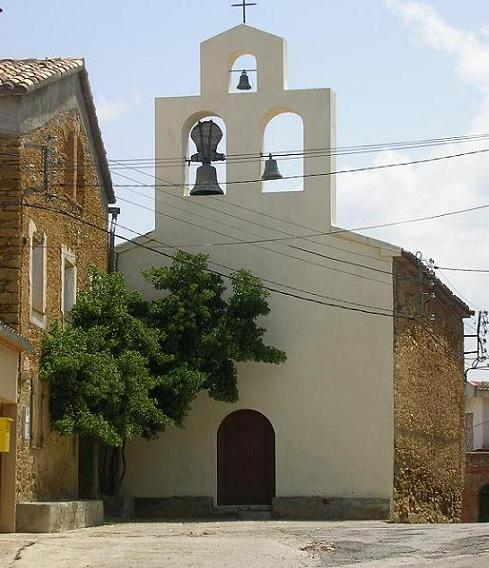

- Location within Province of Lleida Location within Catalonia Location within Spain
- Coordinates: 42°0′21″N 0°43′10″E
- Country: Spain
- Community: Catalonia
- Province: Lleida
- Municipality: Àger
- Elevation: 665 m (2,182 ft)

Population
  - Total: 45

Agulló (Catalan pronunciation: [aɣuˈʎo]) is a locality located in the municipality of Àger, in Province of Lleida province, Catalonia, Spain. As of 2020, it has a population of 45.

== Geography ==
Agulló is located 65km north-northeast of Lleida.
