= Mare de Déu del Mont =

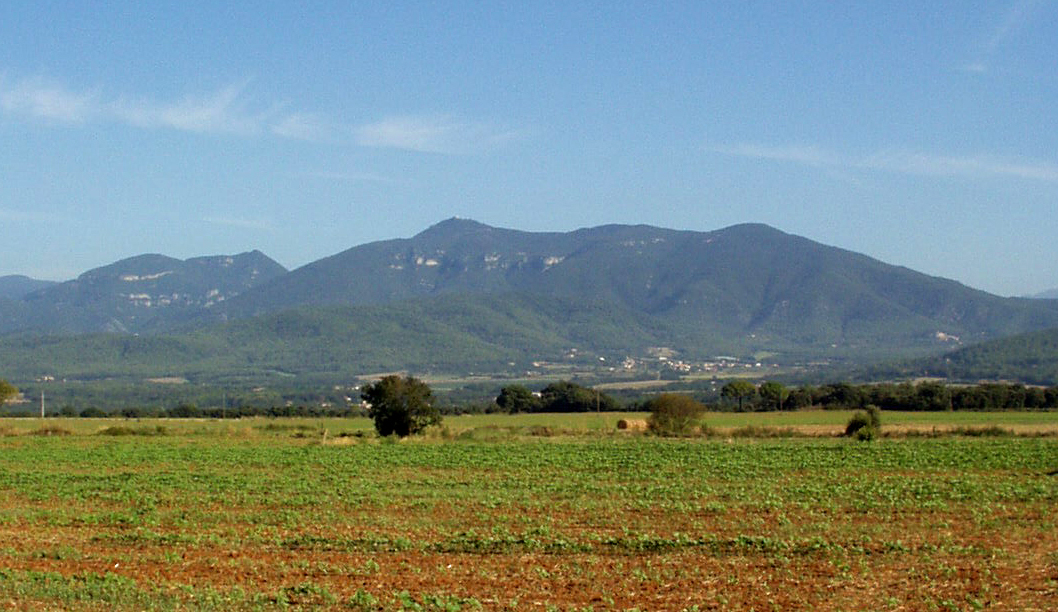
- Summer view of the range

Highest point
- Peak: El Mont
- Elevation: 1,123 m (3,684 ft)
- Listing: Mountains of Catalonia
- Coordinates: 42°15′N 2°42′E

Geography
- Location within Pyrenees Location within Catalonia
- Country: Spain
- Province: Girona
- Community: Catalonia
- Comarques: Garrotxa; Alt Empordà
- Parent range: Pre-Pyrenees, eastern zone

Geology
- Orogeny: Alpine orogeny
- Rock age: Mesozoic
- Rock type(s): Conglomerate, clay

Climbing
- Easiest route: From Albanyà

Mare de Déu del Mont, also known as Serra del Mont, is a mountain range of the Alta Garrotxa natural region, Catalonia, Spain. It has an elevation of 1,123 metres (3,684 ft) above sea level.

== Description ==
This mountain has a traditional Virgin Mary shrine on top of El Mont, the highest peak that gives its name to the range. This summit is one of the Emblematic Summits of Catalonia.

The Mare de Déu del Mont shrine is very popular, its name meaning Mother of God of the Mountain. It has been often mentioned in Catalan literature, having been referred to as Porta del Pirineu, meaning "the Gate of the Pyrenees", among other epithets. Catalan poet Jacint Verdaguer stayed in the sanctuary on top of the summit in 1884 and wrote some verses about the mountain. Recently a statue honoring the poet has been unveiled on top of the mountain.

== Features ==
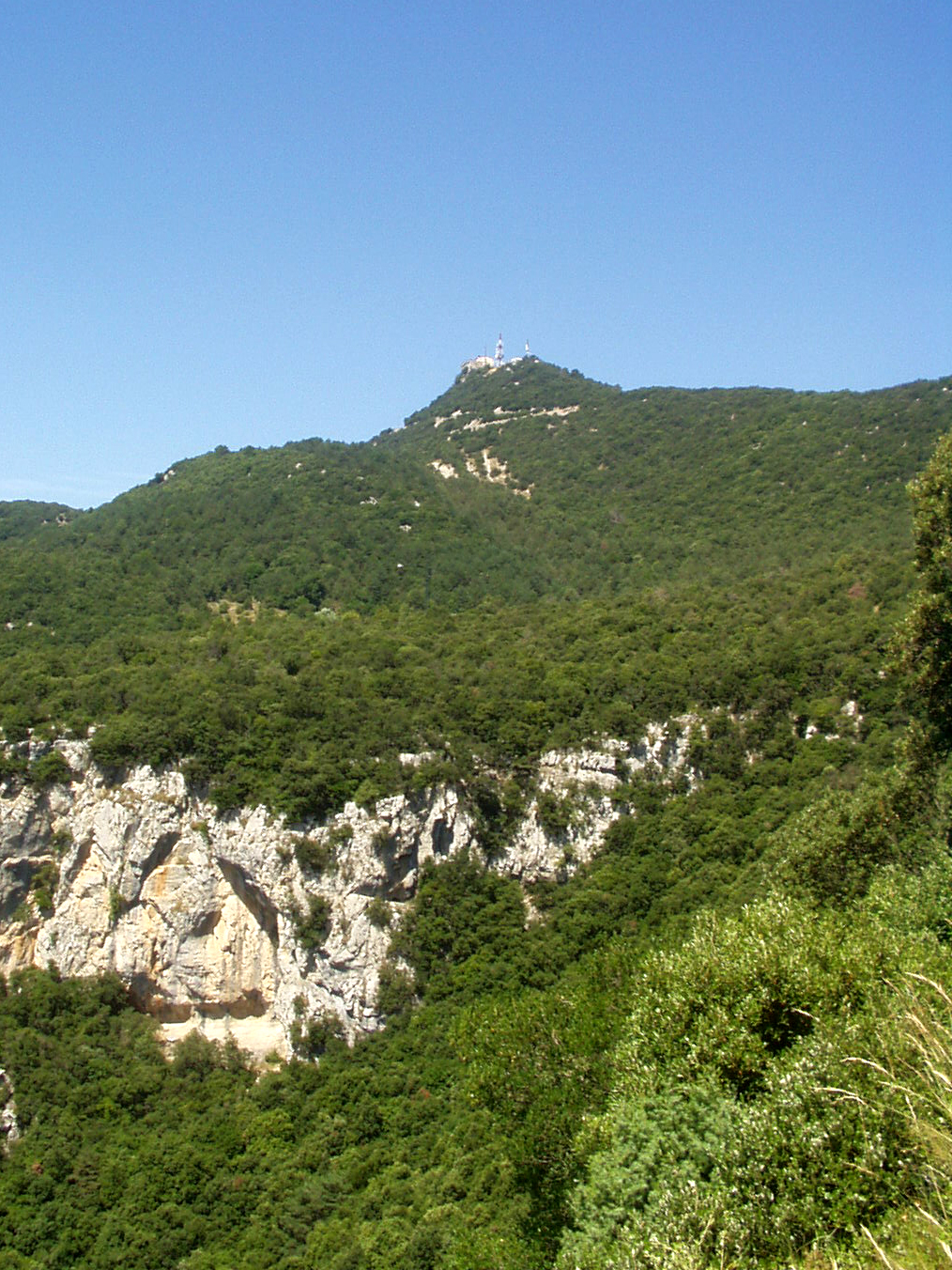
View of El Mont, the highest peak in the range.

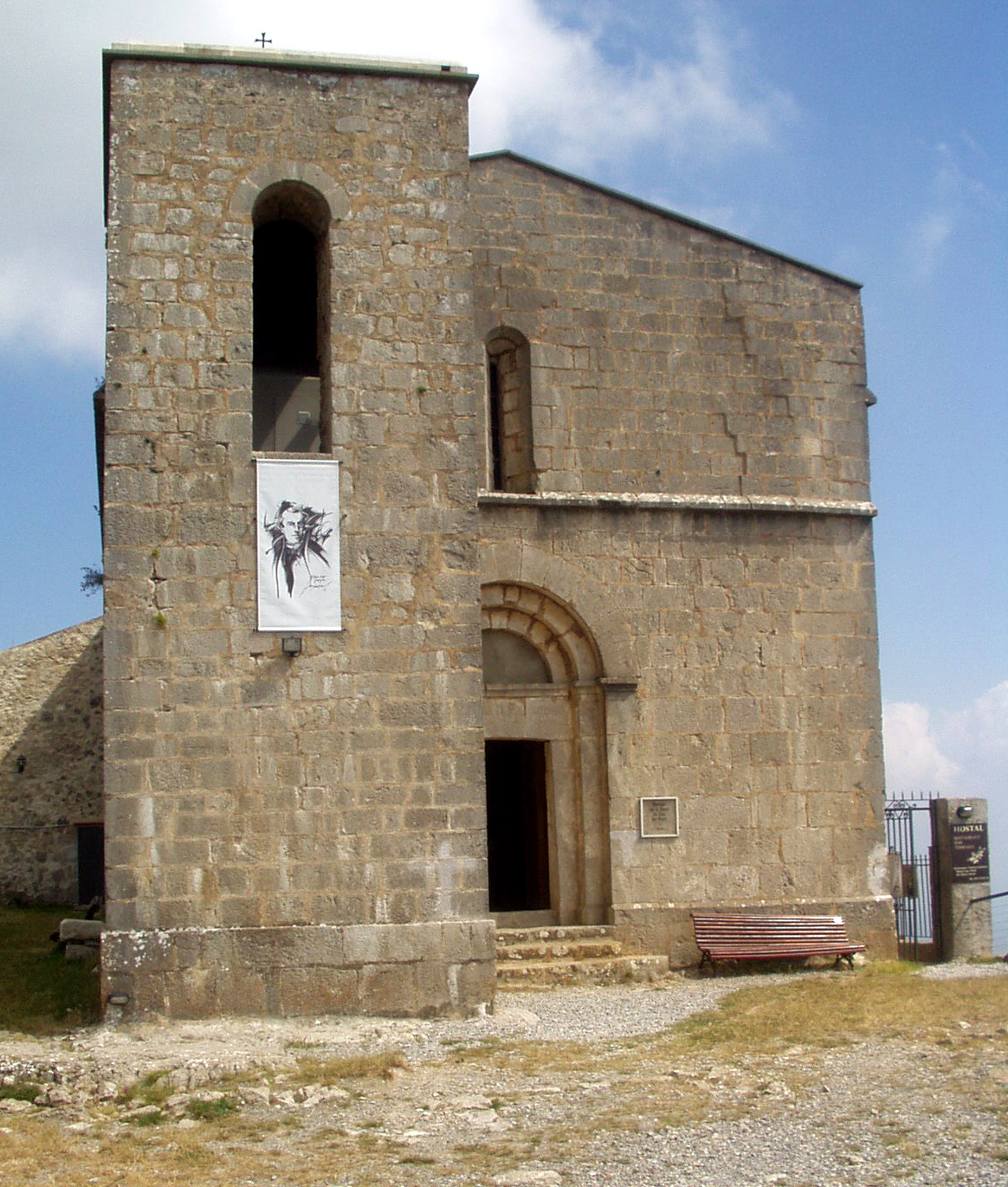
View of the shrine on top of the summit
