= Montsec Range =

Mountain range in the Pre-Pyrenees region

Montsec
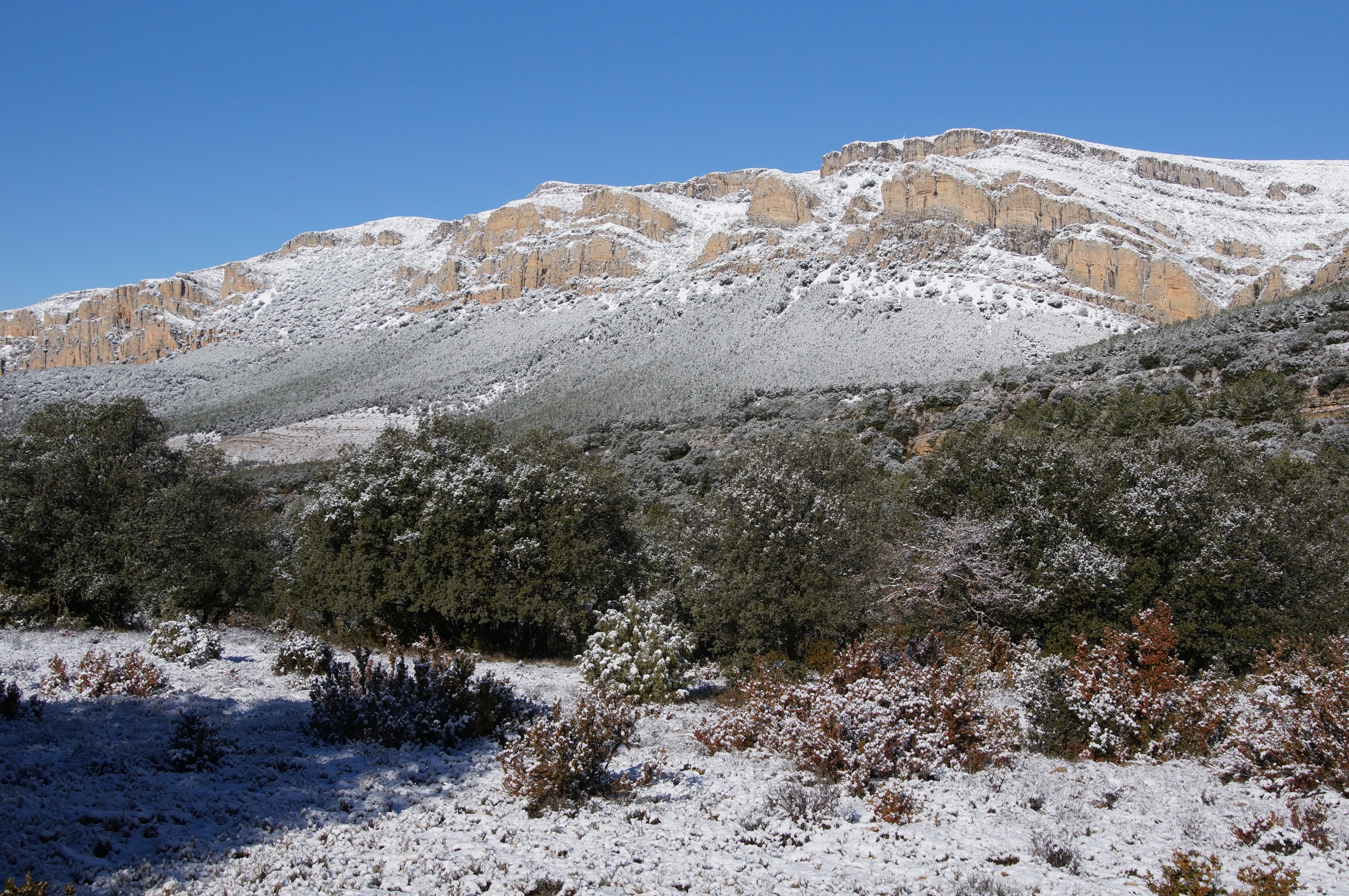
- Serrat de la Corona ridges of the Montsec d'Ares; central sector of the Montsec Range

Highest point
- Elevation: 1,676 m (5,499 ft)
- Coordinates: 42°2′N 0°45′E

Geography
- Location within Pyrenees
- Location: Aragon & Catalonia
- Parent range: Pre-Pyrenees

Geology
- Mountain type: Limestone

The Montsec Range (Catalan: Serra del Montsec Catalan pronunciation: [ˈsɛra ðel monˈsɛk]; Spanish: Sierra del Montsec) is a mountain system of the Pre-Pyrenees.

== Description ==
The Serra del Montsec consists of a series of calcareous mountain ranges running roughly from east to west. The range system is about 40 km long and 186.96 square kilometres in area. The Montsec is located in the Catalan province of Lleida and the Aragonese province of Huesca in Spain.

== Geography ==
The name Montsec derives from the Latin Montus sectus, which makes reference to its characteristic rock formations. It marks the southern limit of the Pallars region and is divided into three main massifs by 3 of the most important rivers in Catalonia:

- Montsec de Rúbies, the eastern massif, is separated by the river Segre in the east and the Noguera Pallaresa in the middle,
- Montsec d'Ares, the central massif.
- Montsec d'Estall, in Aragon, located to the west, separated by the Noguera Ribagorçana from the central massif.

Two gorges (congostos), those of Terradets and Montrebei, or Bonremei, have been opened by the action of the rivers and tectonic movements. The highest peak, Santalís, is found in the central massif, standing at 1,678 metres, and dominates views over Àger and the plains of Lleida to the south and the Pyrenees to the north.

The southern face is virtually a great wall with a "step" about two-thirds of the way up, and the northern side, although by no means as steep, still stands at 1,000 metres above the Tremp basin below.

=== Geographical features ===
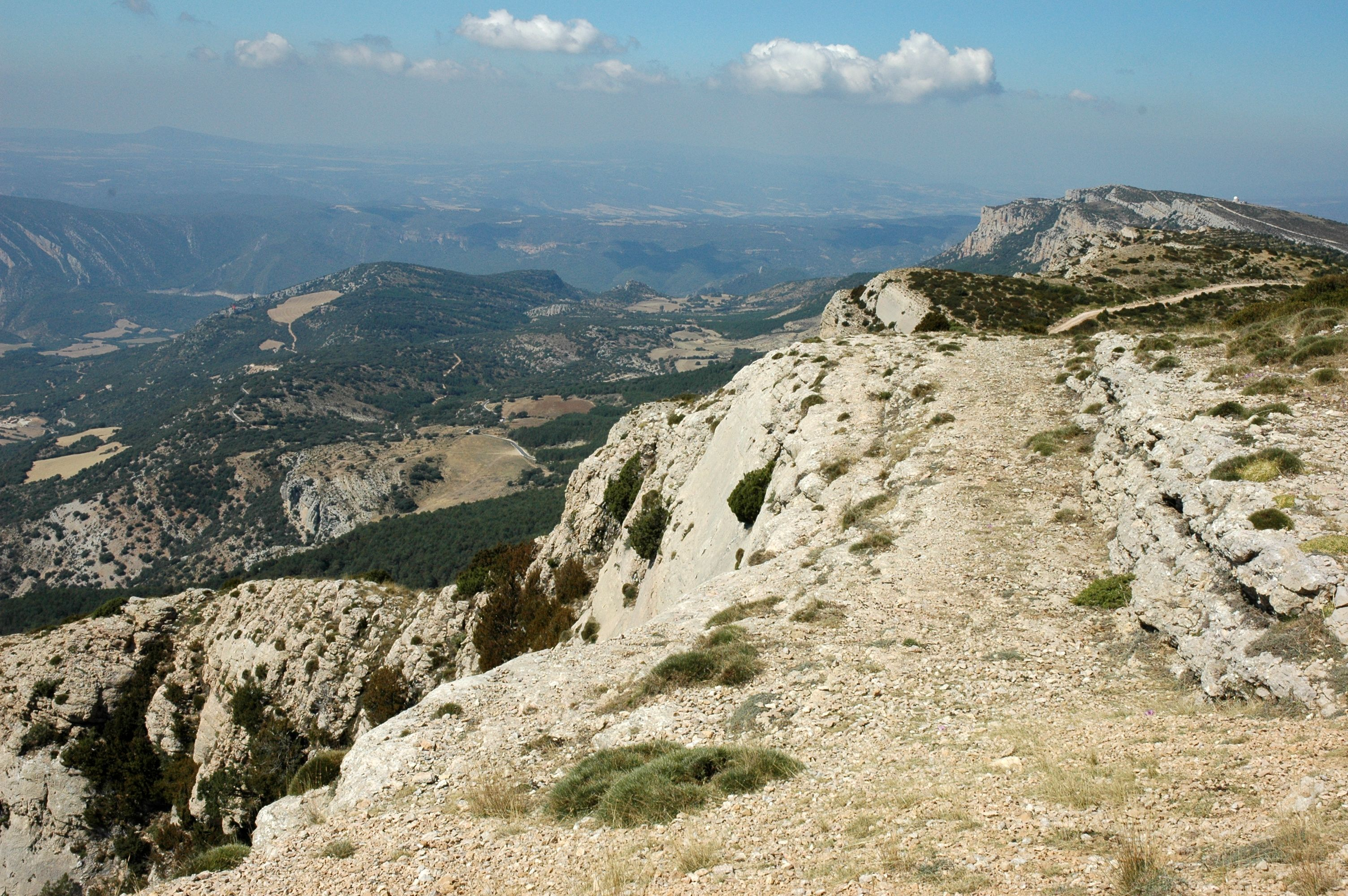
Sant Alís a 1.675 m high peak in Serra del Montsec

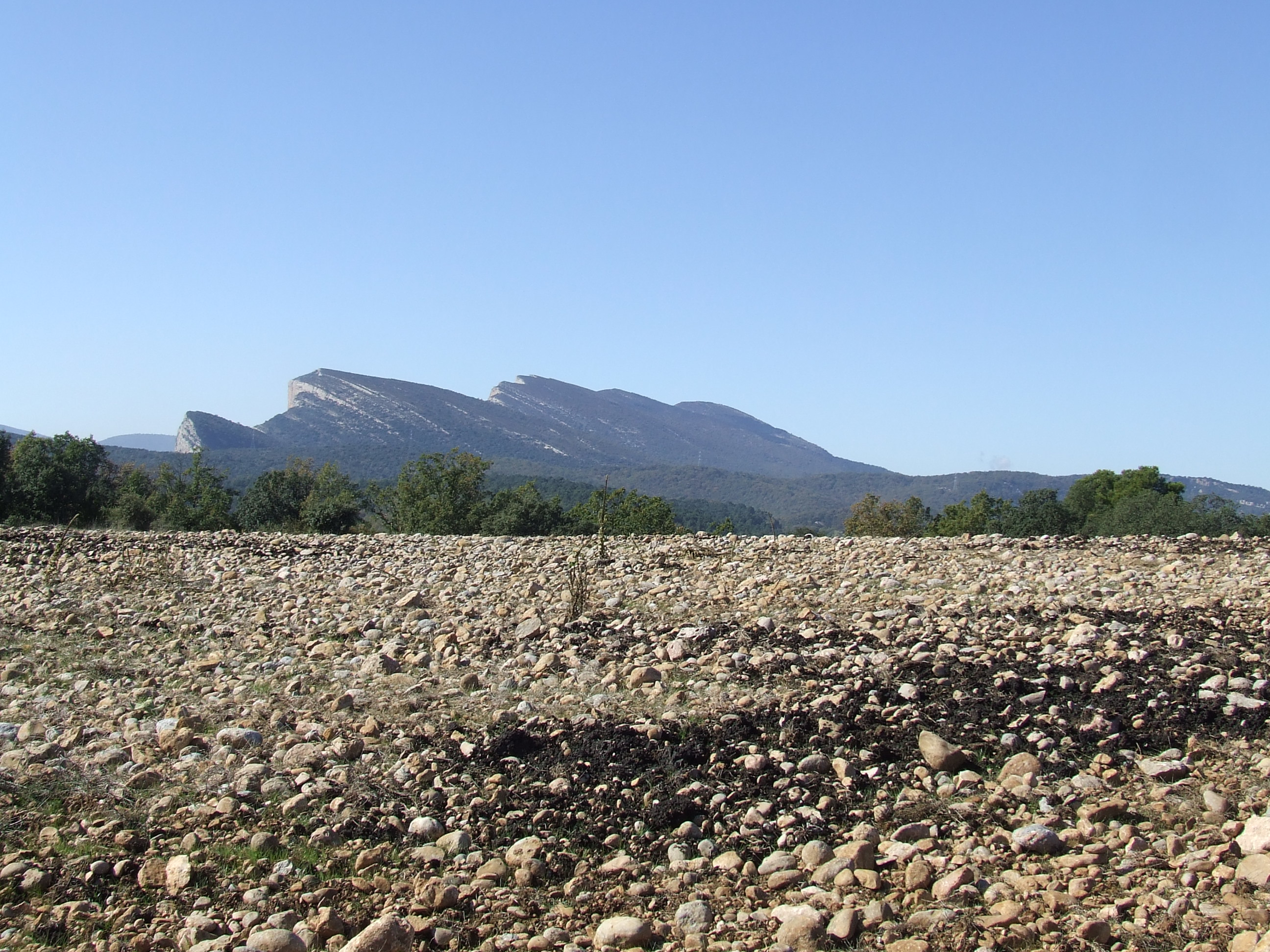
Llimiana. Cliffs at the Montsec de Rúbies seen from Montadó.

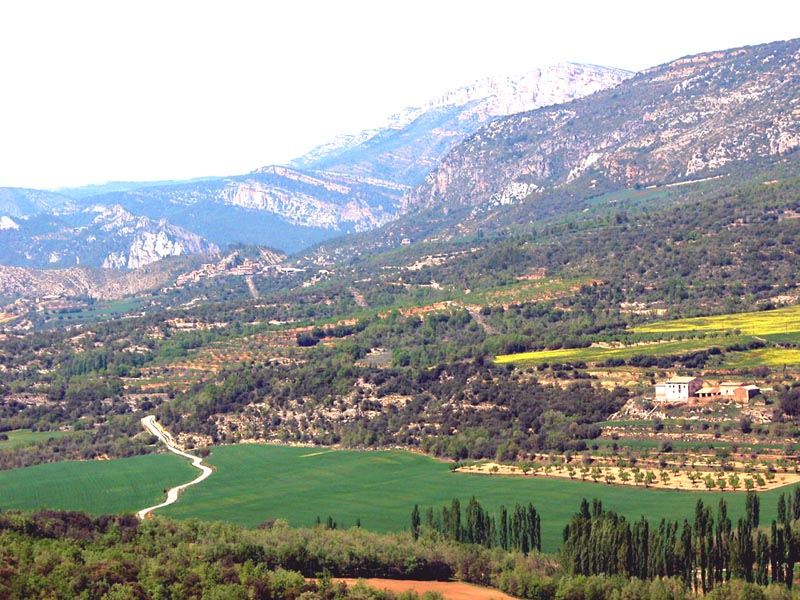
View of Corçà, Àger municipality, with the Montsec d'Estall in the background.

== Formation ==
Montsec's formation goes back to when sediments of several thousand metres deep were deposited in the Cretaceous sea, raised and partly covered by the Eocene sea, and then raised again by Pyrenean folding. Fossils from the Mesozoic era are relatively easy to find, and at Vilanova de Meià the deposits there are one of the most important in the world.

== History ==
Montsec stands in a natural defensive position over the plains and is relatively protected from the icy winds from the north, and as such its strategic aspect was very important in times of the Reconquista. In the 10th century, when the caliphate of Córdoba was at its height, Balaguer was the northernmost Arab city, and the castles of Castelló de Farfanya, Algerri, and Os de Balaguer were satellite fortifications which, together with a barrier of well-placed watch towers, formed the line of defense against the Christians to the north of Montsec. In the 11th and 18th centuries the area had one of the densest populations in Catalonia, but the population level began to fall at the beginning of the 20th century, and nowadays emigration is prominent and many villages are virtually abandoned.

It is an area of natural interest, due to its caves, Astronomical Park, and activities, including kayaking, hiking, paddle-surfing, and gliding.

== Economy ==
The difficulty of irrigation makes for a very limited agriculture in the area. Local farmers cultivate mostly some barley and almonds. Hydroelectric power is another resource but most of all planners are looking to tourist development to give the region an important boost.

== See also ==
- Geology of the Pyrenees
- Pallars
