= Sant Amand =

Mountain of Catalonia, Spain

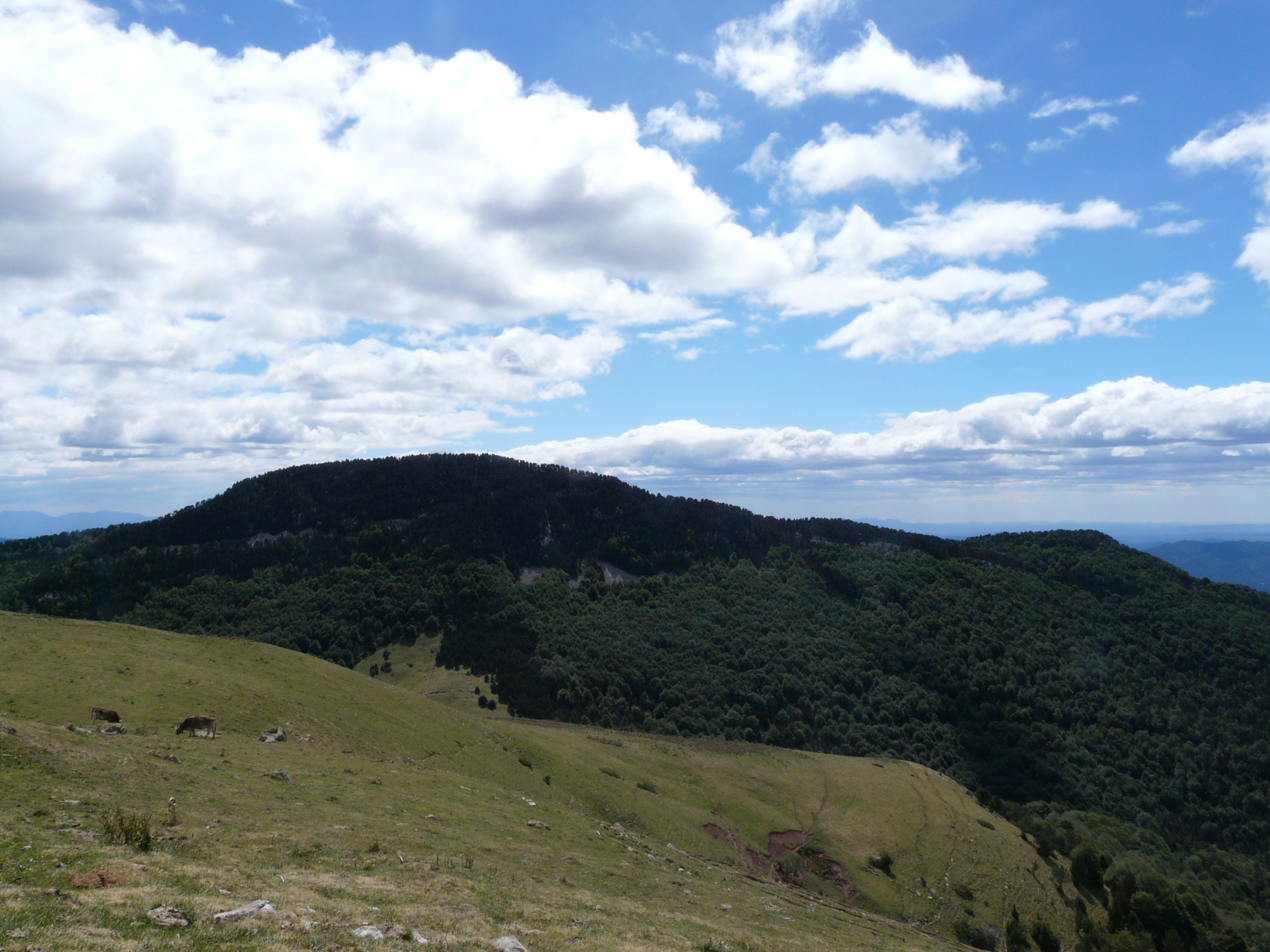
- The hill of Sant Amand seen from the Taga.

Highest point
- Elevation: 1,851 m (6,073 ft)
- Coordinates: 42°15′55.21″N 2°12′26.31″E

Geography
- Location: Ripollès, Catalonia
- Parent range: Sub-Pyrenees

Climbing
- Easiest route: From Ogassa

Sant Amand or Puig de Sant Amand is a mountain of Catalonia, Spain. It has an elevation of 1,851 metres above sea level.

== See also ==
- Sub-Pyrenees
- Mountains of Catalonia
