= Fundació Noguera =

Cultural institution and publishing house in Catalan

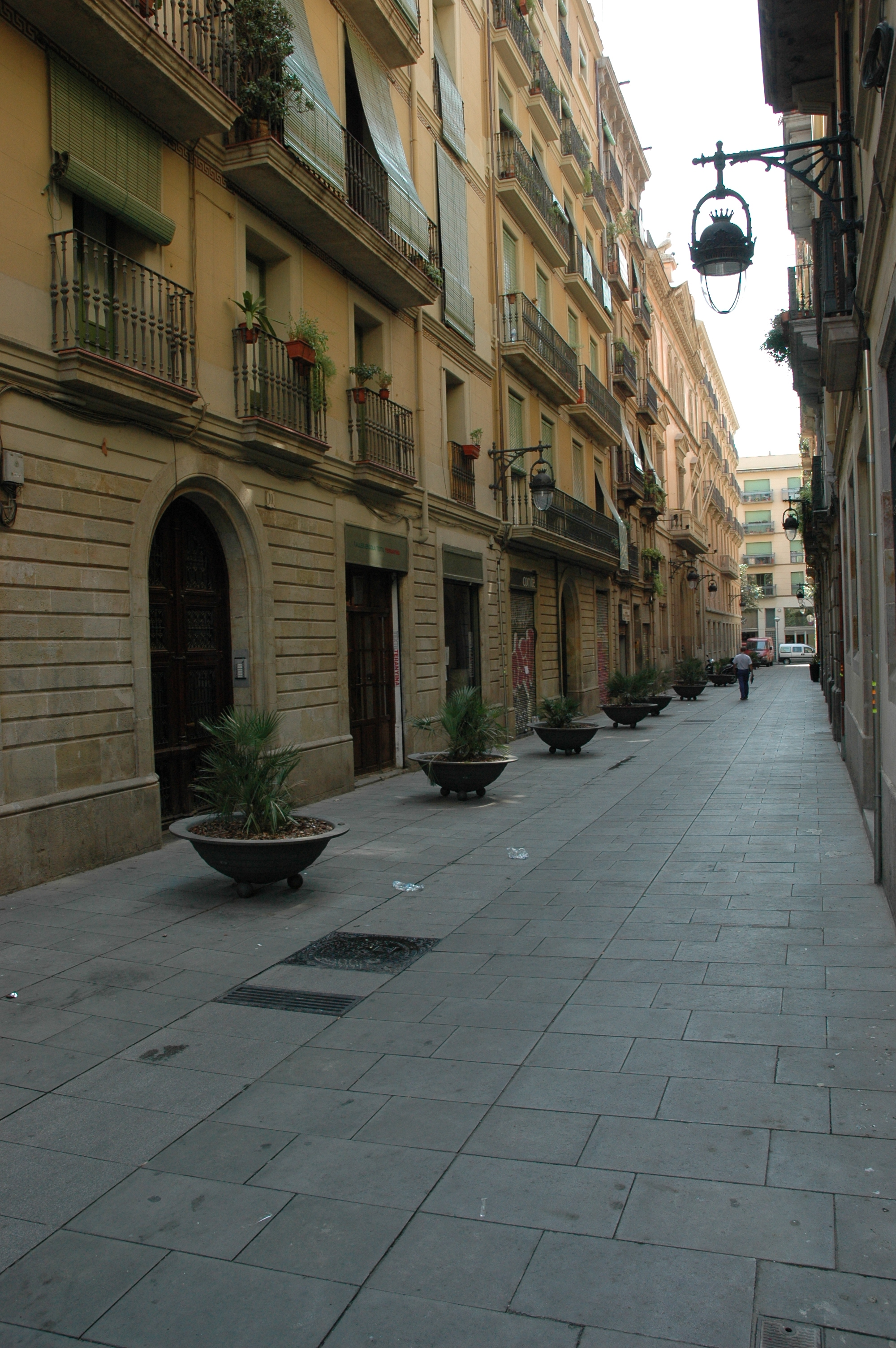
Raval - Carrer Notariat

Fundació Noguera is a Catalan nonprofit cultural institution, founded in Barcelona on July 20, 1976, by Raimon Noguera i de Guzman. It seeks to improve the historical coverage of Catalonia in documents, and is responsible for publishing numerous books and publications related to Catalan history and heritage and legal texts of special interest in the evolution of Catalan law etc. The president since 2007 is Joan-Josep López.
