= Corçà, Àger =

Corçà
- Locality
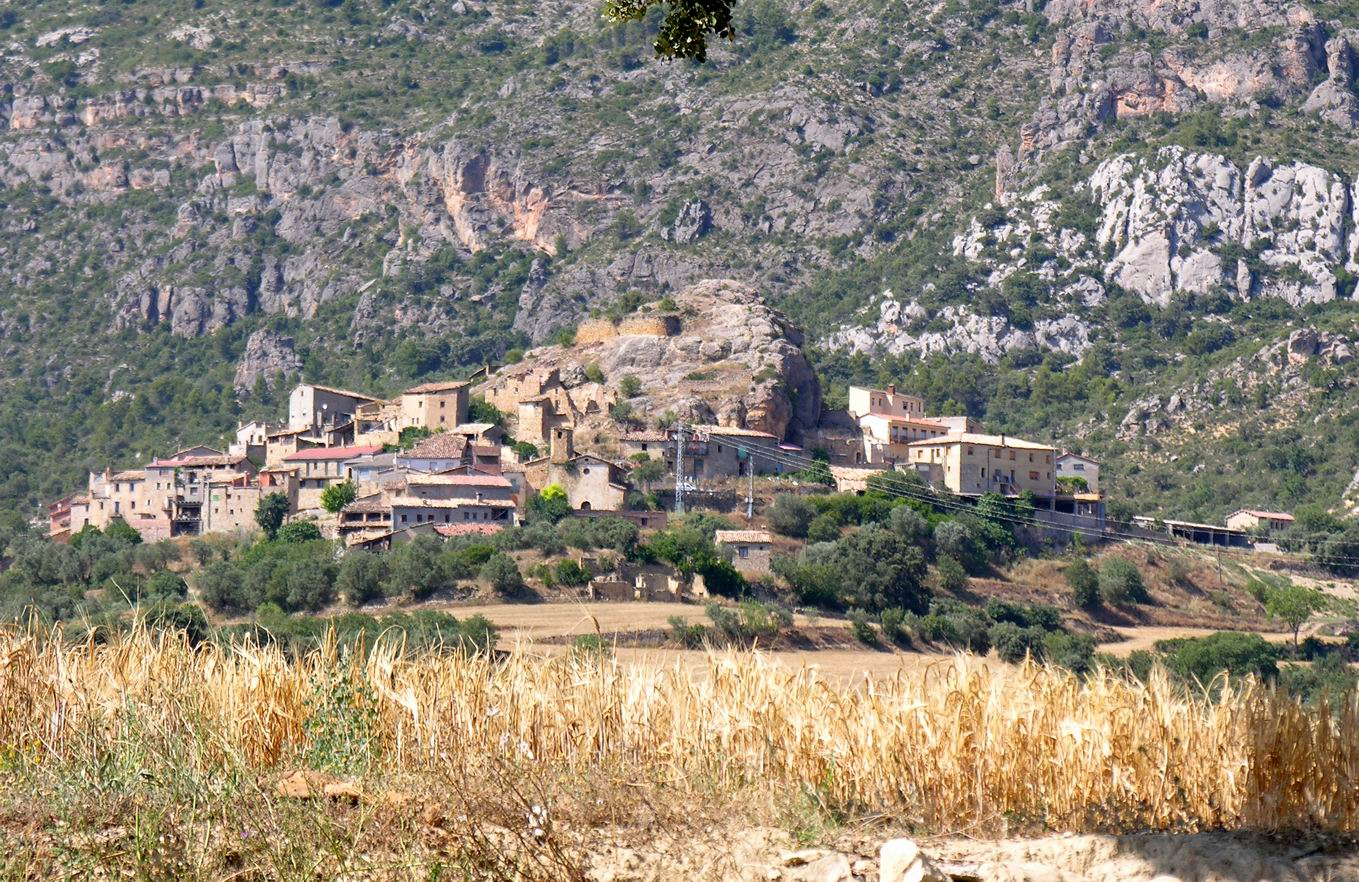

- Location within Province of Lleida Location within Catalonia Location within Spain
- Coordinates: 42°1′49″N 0°41′11″E
- Country: Spain
- Community: Catalonia
- Province: Lleida
- Municipality: Àger
- Elevation: 694 m (2,277 ft)

Population
  - Total: 24

Corçà (Catalan pronunciation: [koɾˈsa]) is a locality located in the municipality of Àger, in Province of Lleida province, Catalonia, Spain. As of 2020, it has a population of 24.

== Geography ==
Corçà is located 70km north of Lleida.
