= Sant Pere de Torelló =

- Municipality
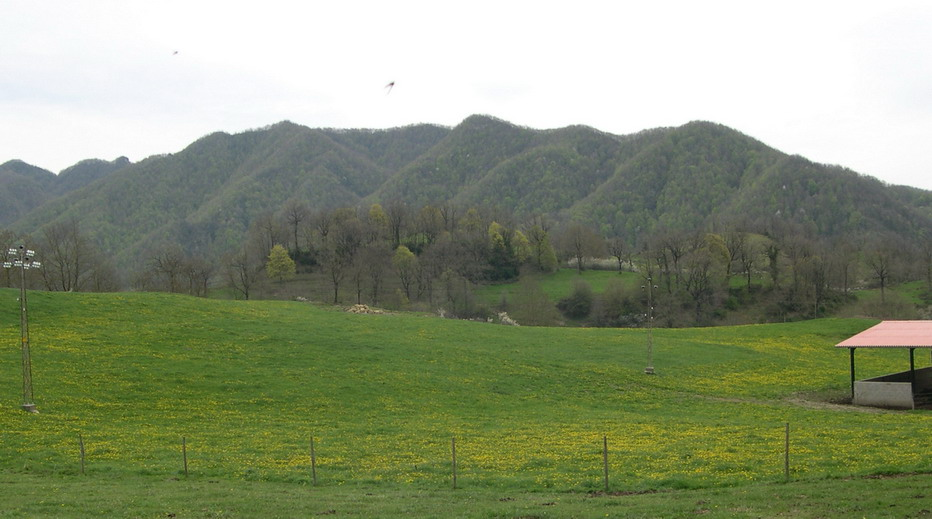
- L'Àliga hill, highest point in Sant Pere de Torelló

- Coat of arms

- Location in Spain Sant Pere de Torelló (Catalonia) Sant Pere de Torelló (Spain)
- Coordinates: 42°4′38″N 2°17′47″E
- Country: Spain
- Community: Catalonia
- Province: Barcelona
- Comarca: Osona

Government
  - Mayor: Jordi Fàbrega Colomer (2015)

Area
  - Total: 55.1 km^{2} (21.3 sq mi)

Population (2025-01-01)
  - Total: 2,596
  - Density: 47.1/km^{2} (122/sq mi)
- Website: stpere.cat

Sant Pere de Torelló (Catalan pronunciation: [ˈsam ˈpeɾə ðə tuɾəˈʎo], locally [- tuɾəˈjo]) is a municipality in the comarca of Osona in Catalonia, Spain.

== Interesting places ==
- Santuari de Bellmunt
