= Pre-Pyrenees =

Hill range in the Pyrenees

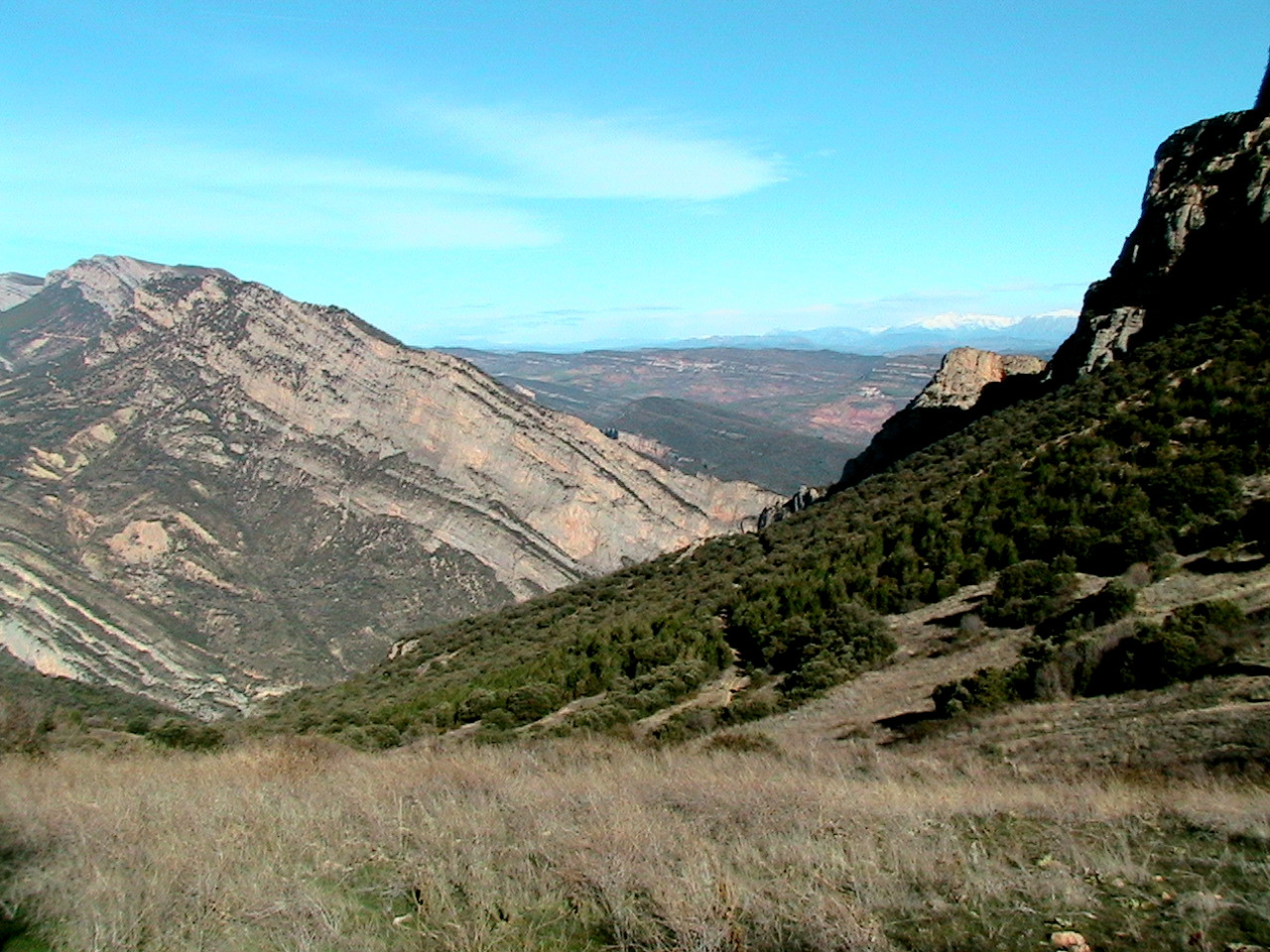
- Montsec d'Ares, part of the Pyrenees Foothills

Dimensions
- Length: 425 km (264 mi) E/W
- Width: 40 km (25 mi) N/S

Geography
- Topographic map of the Pyrenees
- Countries: Spain; France
- Range coordinates: 42°20′N 1°0′E

Geology
- Orogeny: Alpine orogeny

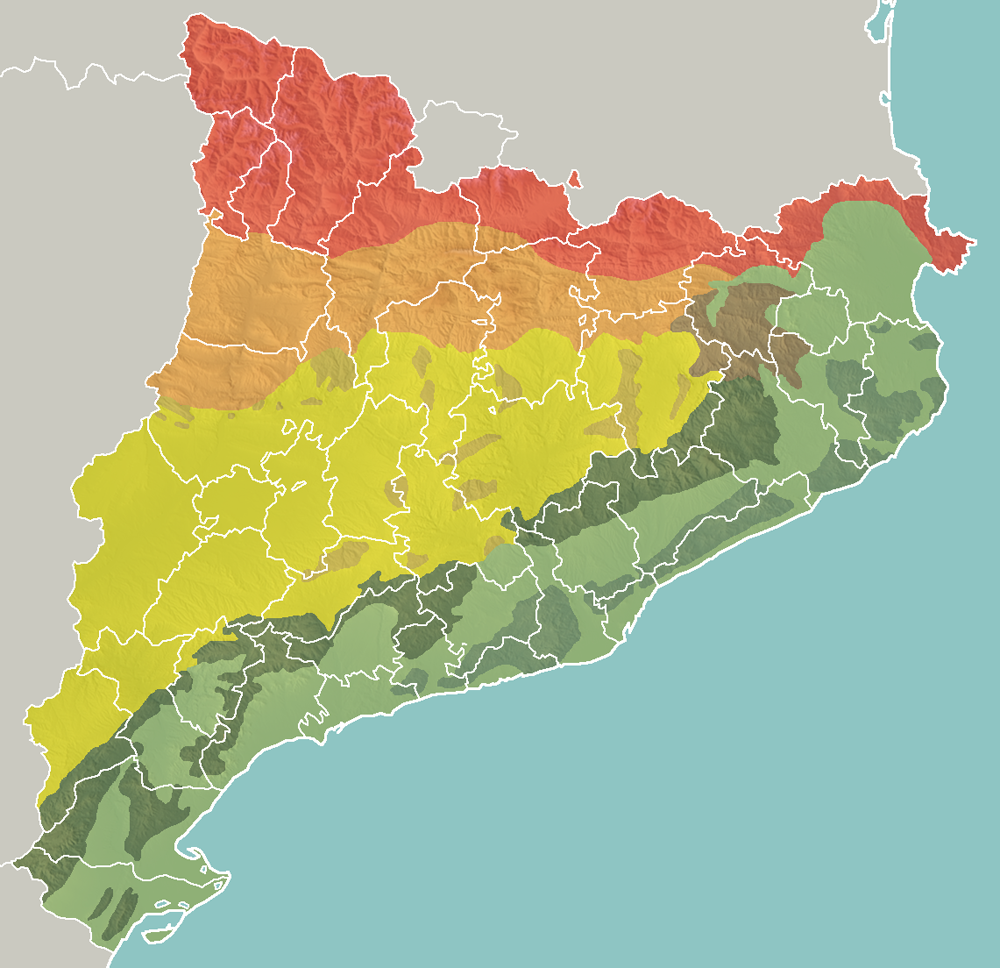
Geomorphologic map of Catalonia: Pyrenees; Pre-Pyrenees; Catalan Central Depression; Smaller mountain ranges of the Central Depression; Catalan Transversal Range; Catalan Pre-Coastal Range; Catalan Coastal Range; Catalan Coastal Depression and other coastal and pre-coastal plains

The Pre-Pyrenees (Basque: Pirinioak aurrekoak; Catalan: El Prepirineu) are the foothills of the Pyrenees.

== Description ==
As a mountainous system, the Pre-Pyrenees are part of the Pyrenees. They run parallel to the main mountain range in a west-to-east direction.

On the French side, the Pyrenees's slopes descend rather abruptly; thus, on the northern side, the Pre-Pyrenees are confined to the Corbières Massif, towards the eastern end of the mountain system. The Massif de Plantaurel further west deserves mention as well, although not as clearly a foothill.

On the Iberian side, however, the picture is very different: a large and complex system of foothill ranges stretches from Navarre, across northern Aragon, reaching the Mediterranean coast on the Catalan end of the Pyrenees. At the eastern end on the southern side lies a distinct area known as the Sub-Pyrenees.

== Main ranges ==
Although the highest peaks in the Pre-Pyrenees are not as high as those in the Pyrenees proper, some of the ranges are quite massive, with summits reaching up to 2,600 m (8,500 ft).

=== Northern slope ===
- Corbières Massif
- Massif de Plantaurel

=== Southern slope ===
The main ranges are:

In Catalonia

- Serra d'Aubenç
- Serra dels Bastets
- Serra de Bellmunt
- Cingles de Beví
- Serra de Boumort
- Serra de Busa
- Serra del Cadí
  - Montsec de Tost
- Serra de Boumort
- Serra de Camporan
- Serra de les Canals
- Serra de Capsacosta
  - Serra de Malforat
    - Serra de la Cau
- Serra de Carreu
- El Catllaràs
- Serra de Comiols
- Serra del Port del Comte
  - Serra de Querol
  - Serra del Verd
- Serra de Conivella
- Serrat de la Creueta
- Serra d'Ensija
- La Faiada de Malpàs
- Serra de Falgars
- Serra de la Gessa
- Serra de Sant Mamet
- Serra de Moixeró
- Serra de Milany
- Mare de Déu del Mont
- Serra de Monebui
- Serra de Montclús
- Montsec range
  - Montsec de Rúbies, the eastern massif, is separated by the river Segre in the east and the Noguera Pallaresa in the middle.
    - Serra del Cucuc
  - Montsec d'Ares, the central massif.
    - Montrebei
  - Montsec d'Estall, in Aragon, located to the west, separated by the Noguera Ribagorçana from the central massif.
- Serra de Montgrony
- Serra de Prada
- Serra de Picamill
- Serra de Picancel
- Serra de Queralt
- Serra de Sant Gervàs
  - Serra de Setcomelles
- Serra de Sant Joan
- Serra de Sant Marc
- Serra de serra de Sobremunt
- Serra del Volterol
- Serra dels Tossals
- Serra de Turp
- Rasos de Peguera
  - Serrat de la Figuerassa

In Aragon

- Sierra Caballera
- Sierra del Castillo de Llaguarres
- Sierra de la Carrodilla
- Cotiella
- Serra d'Esdolomada
- Sierra Ferrera
- Sierra de Giró
- Serra del Jordal
- Sierra de las Ares
- Sierra de Guara
- El Turbón
- Sierra de Sis
- Sierra de Santo Domingo
- Sierra de Loarre
- Sierra de Javierre
- Sierra Caballera

In Navarre

- Sierra de Leire

== Features ==
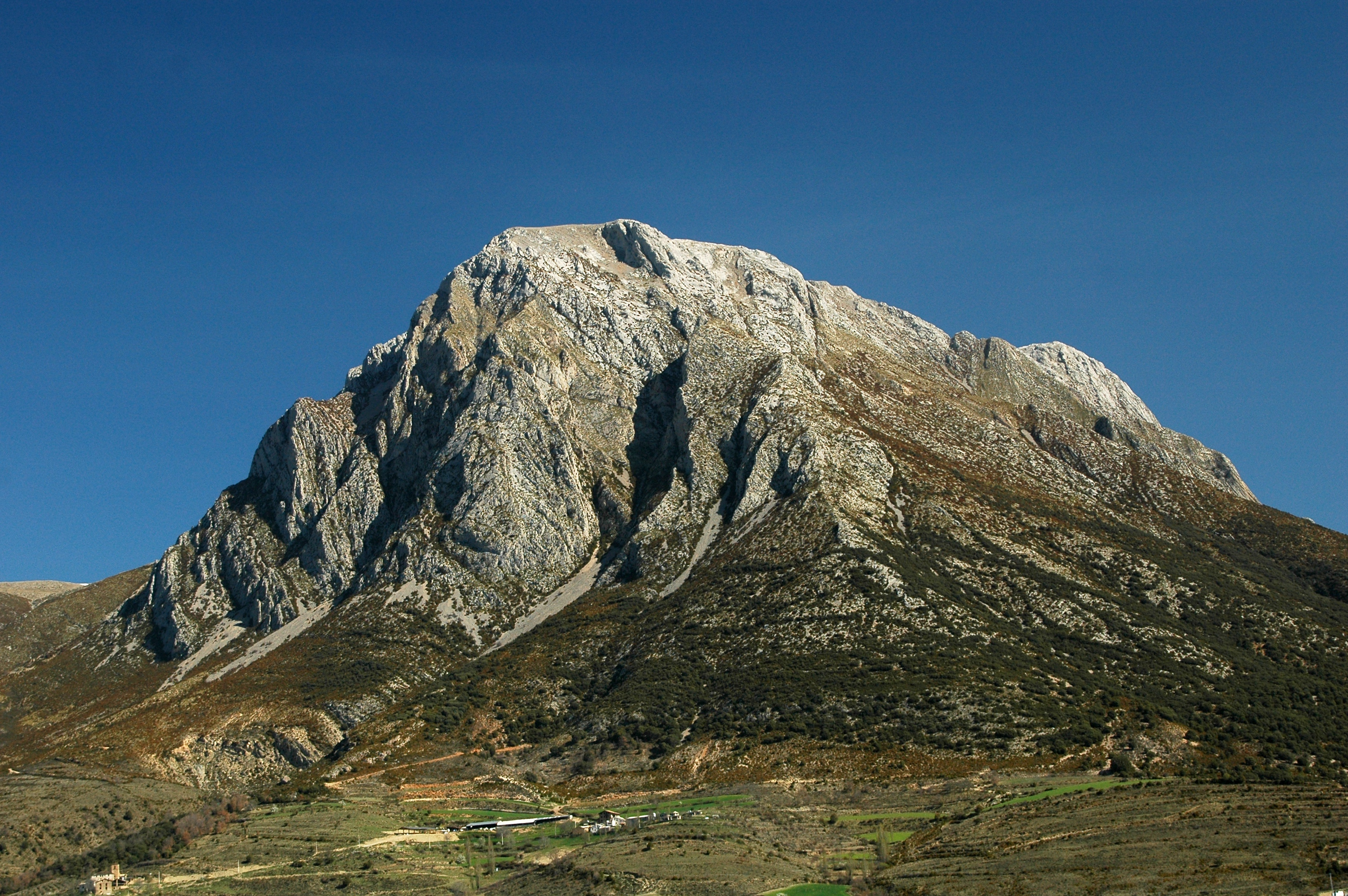
View of El Turbón in Aragon

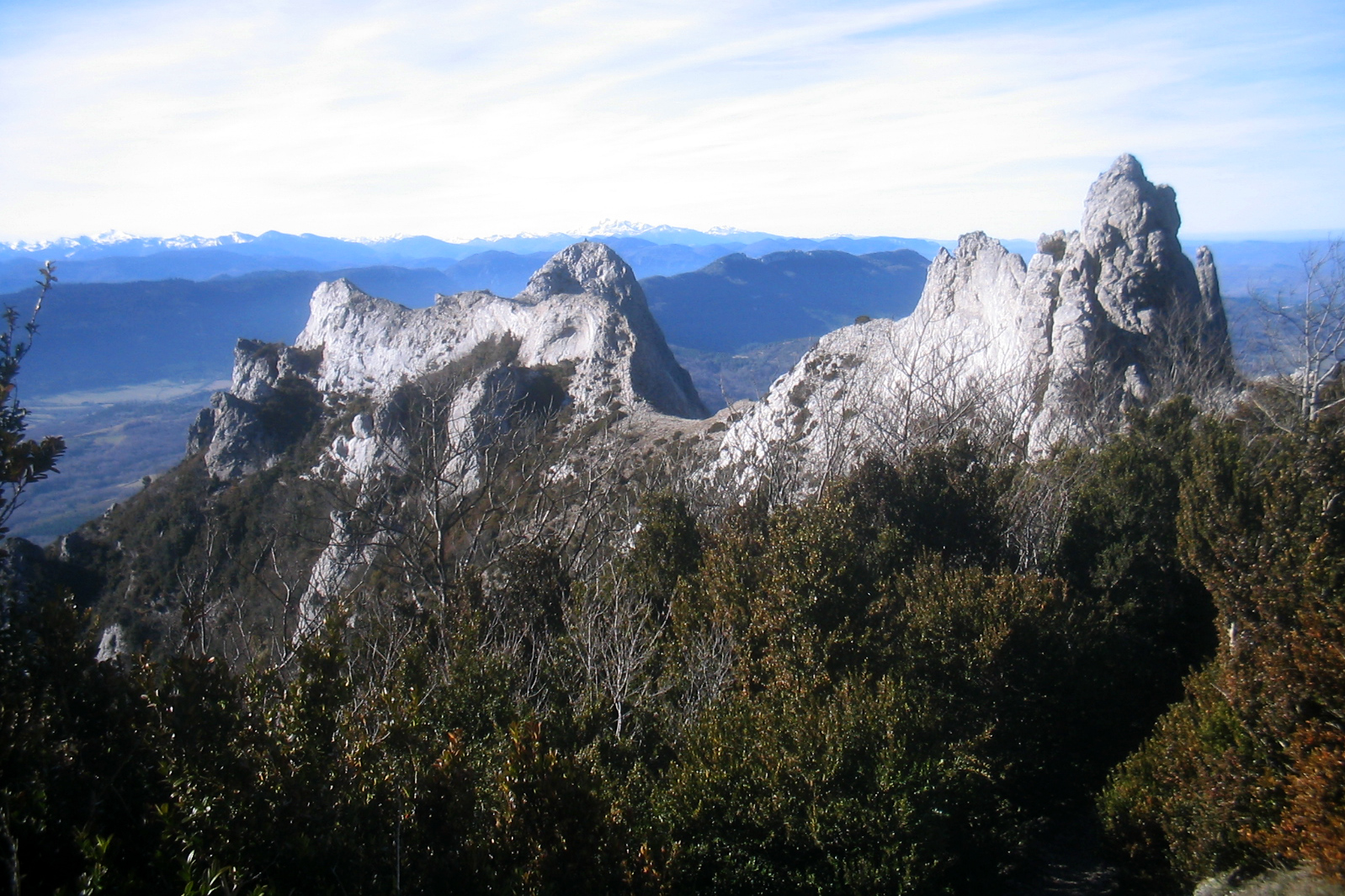
Summits of the Corbières Massif, the only foothill of the Pyrenees on their northern side

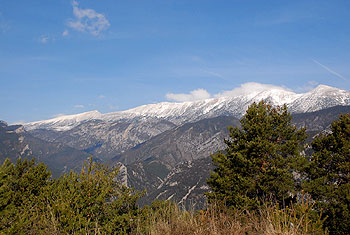
View of Serra del Cadí

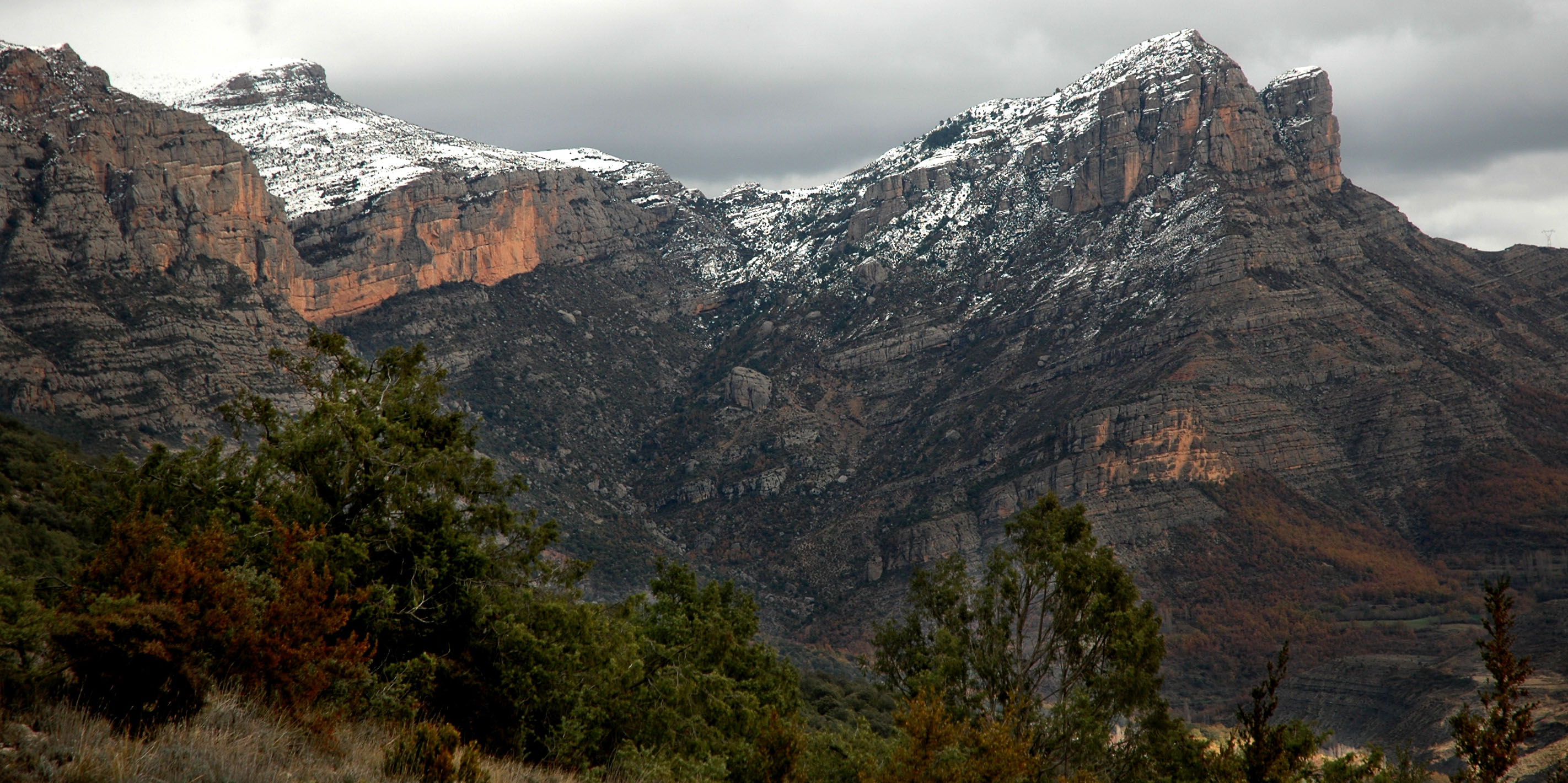
View of the Mountains of Sis

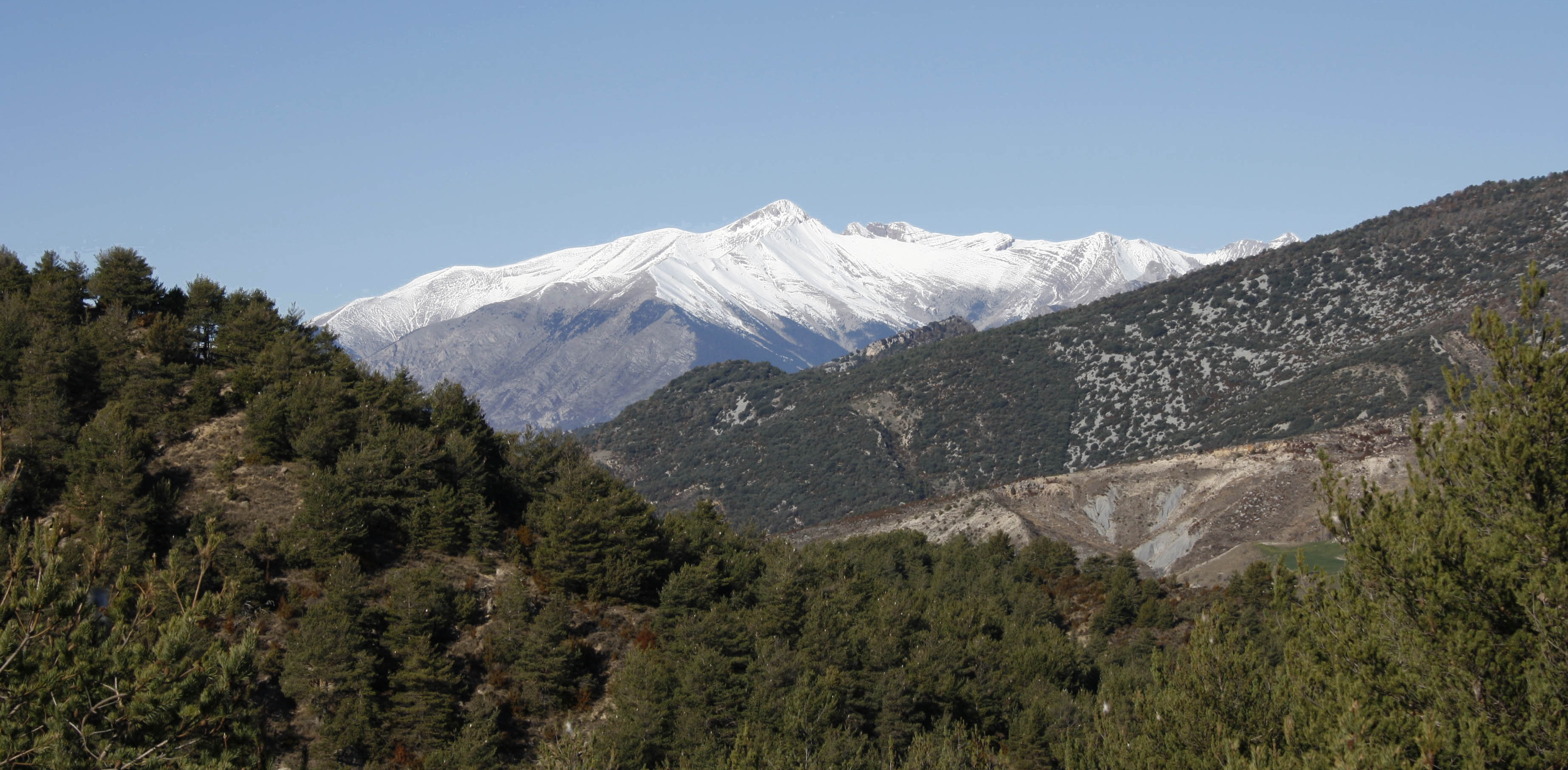
Cotiella

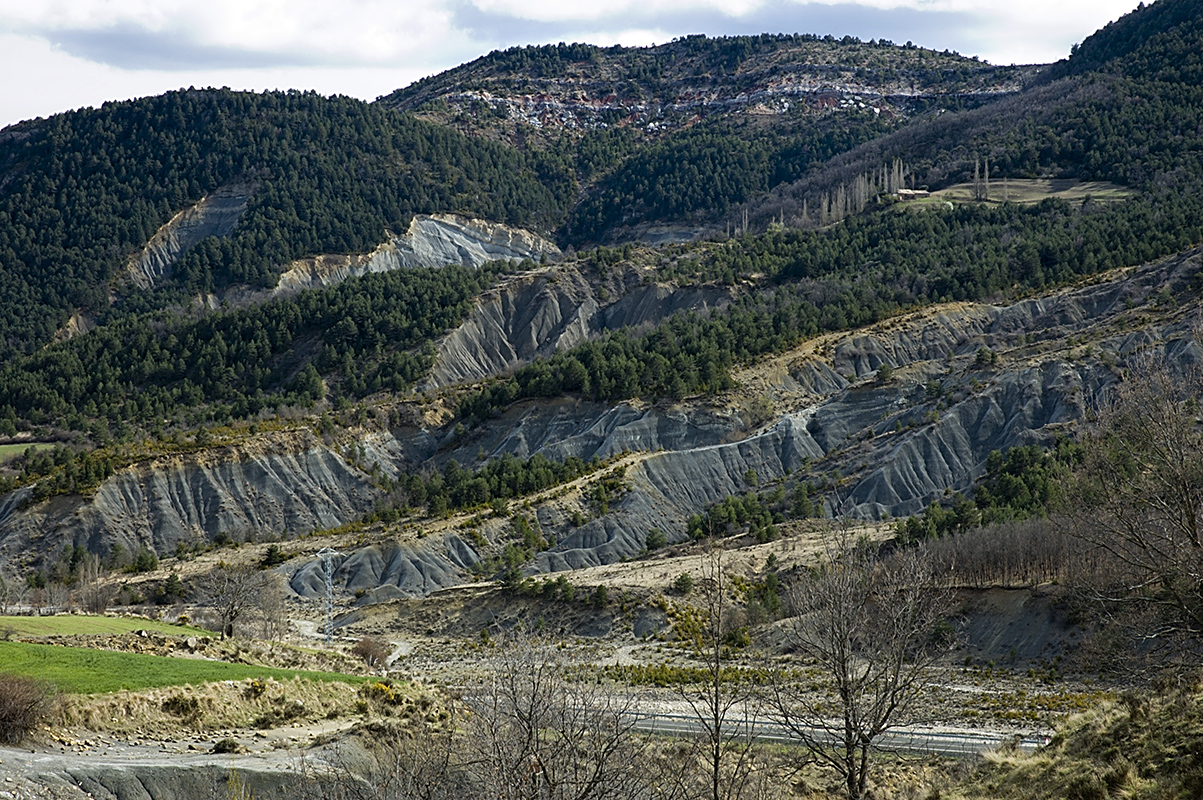
View of Serra del Jordal

Panoramic view of the highest peak of Pedraforca, Pollegó superior

== See also ==
- Geology of the Pyrenees
- Sub-Pyrenees
- List of mountains in Aragon
- List of mountains in Catalonia
