= El Montsec d'Ares =

Mountain in Spain

Montsec d'Ares
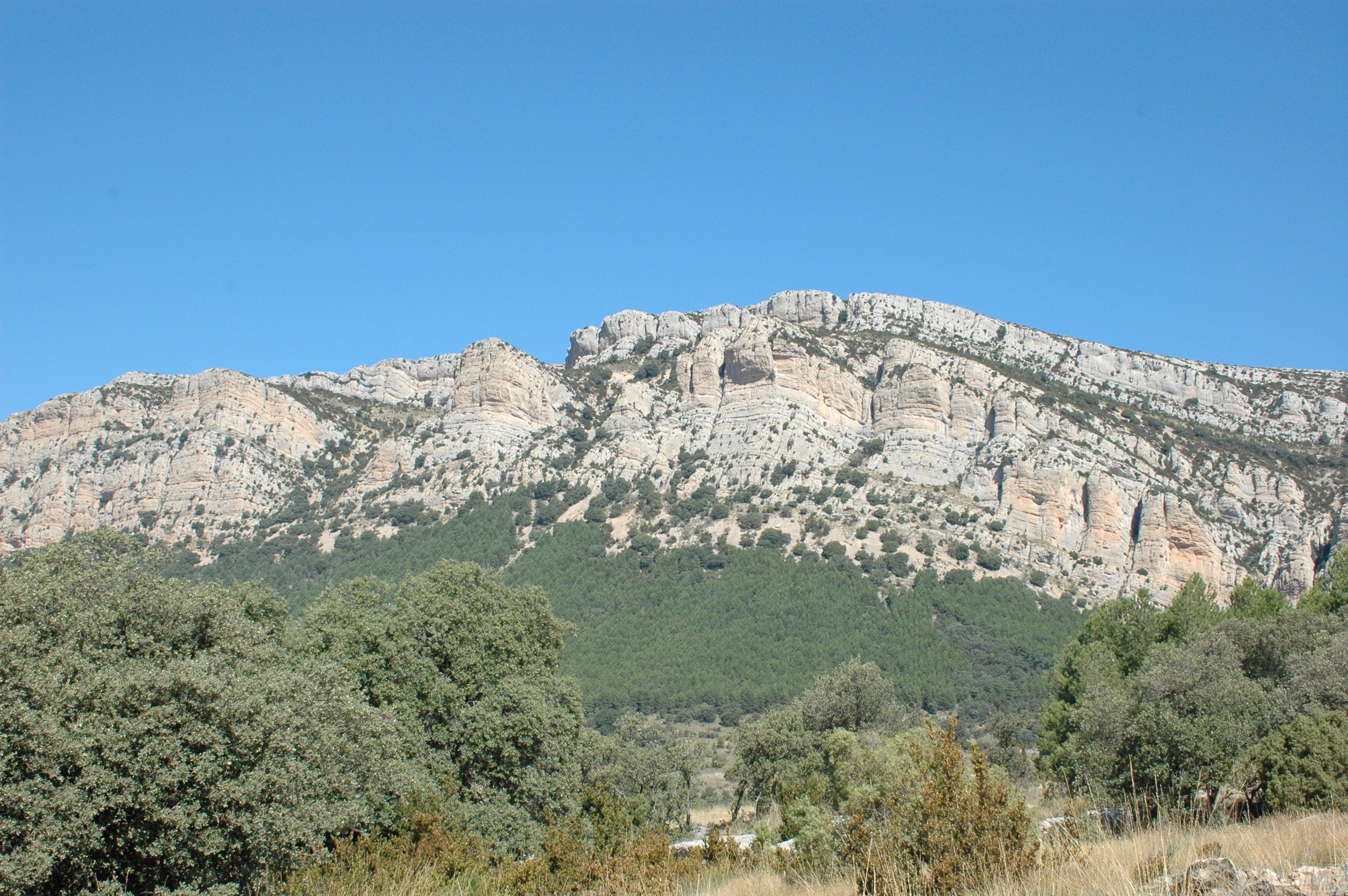
- Montsec d'Ares ridges; central sector of the Serra del Montsec

Highest point
- Peak: Sant Alís
- Coordinates: 42°2′28.82″N 0°46′0.28″E

Geography
- Country: Spain
- Autonomous Community: Catalonia; Aragon
- Province: Lleida; Huesca
- Parent range: Montsec

Montsec d'Ares is the central part of the Montsec mountain range, stretching between the cliffs of Montrebei in the West and Terradets in the East.

== Location ==
La Serra del Montsec is located in the Catalan province of Lleida and in the Aragonese province of Huesca in Spain. Montsec d'Ares is perfectly oriented West – East. The highest point is Sant Alís. Several villages are located in Montsec d'Ares, including as L'Ametlla del Montsec and Ager in the South side and Sant Esteve de la Sarga in the North.
