= Àger =

- Municipality
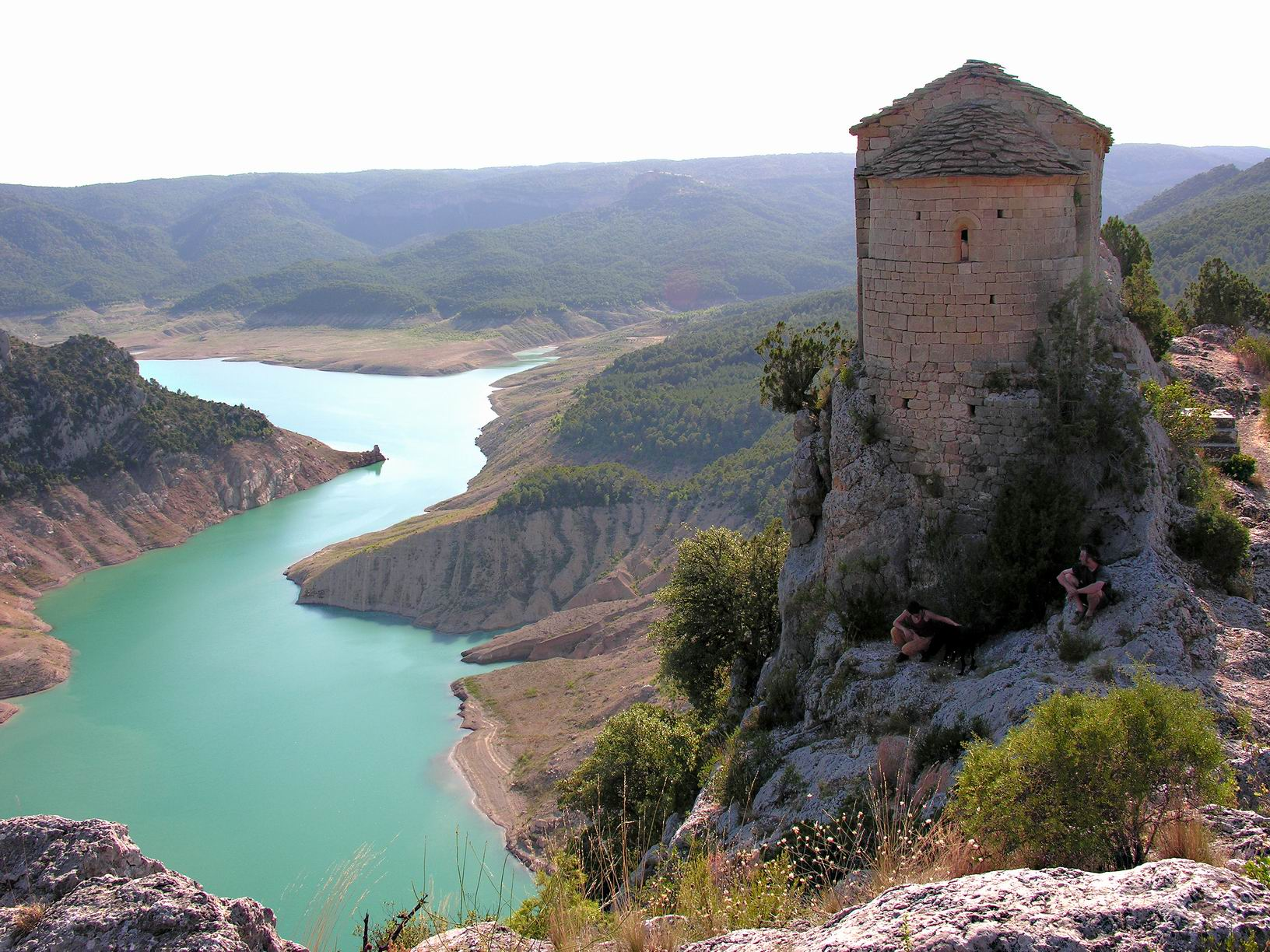
- Mare de Déu de la Pertusa in Corçà

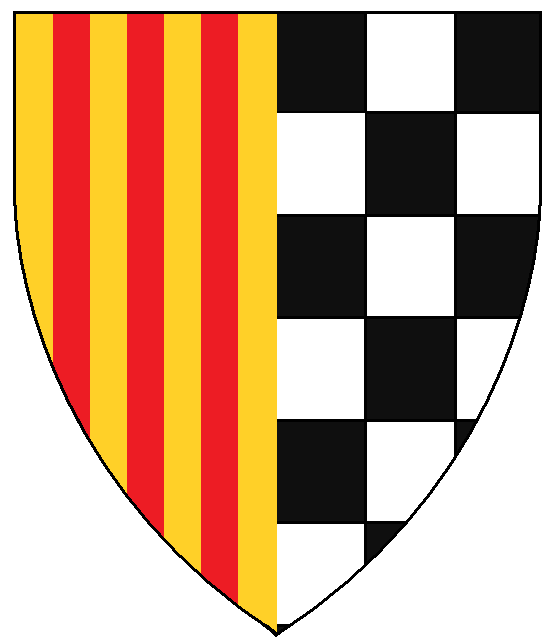
- Coat of arms

- Location in Catalonia
- Coordinates: 42°0′13″N 0°45′45″E
- Country: Spain
- Community: Catalonia
- Province: Lleida
- Comarca: Noguera

Government
  - Mayor: Lluís Ardiaca Montardit (2015)

Area
  - Total: 160.6 km^{2} (62.0 sq mi)
- Elevation: 642 m (2,106 ft)

Population (2025-01-01)
  - Total: 637
  - Density: 3.97/km^{2} (10.3/sq mi)
- Demonym: Agerenc
- Postal code: 25691
- Website: www.ccnoguera.cat/ager

Àger (Catalan pronunciation: [ˈaʒe]; locally [ˈajʒe]) is a municipality in the comarca of the Noguera in Catalonia, Spain. It is situated in the north-west of the comarca, and the territory of the municipality stretches between the Noguera Ribagorçana and Noguera Pallaresa rivers. The Terradets reservoir on the Noguera Pallaresa is situated within the municipality. The village is linked to Balaguer and Tremp by the L-904 road.

It has a population of 637 (register office, 2025).

== Villages ==
- Àger town, 317 inhabitants.
- Agulló, 45 inhabitants.
- Corçà, 32 inhabitants.
- Fontdepou, 16 inhabitants.
- Els Masos de Millà, 17 inhabitants.
- Millà, 5 inhabitants.
- La Règola, 21 inhabitants.
- Sant Josep de Fontdepou, 19 inhabitants.
- Vilamajor, 13 inhabitants.

== See also ==
- Viscounty of Àger
- Apostles from Àger
- Montsec
