= Punta Alta de Comalesbienes =

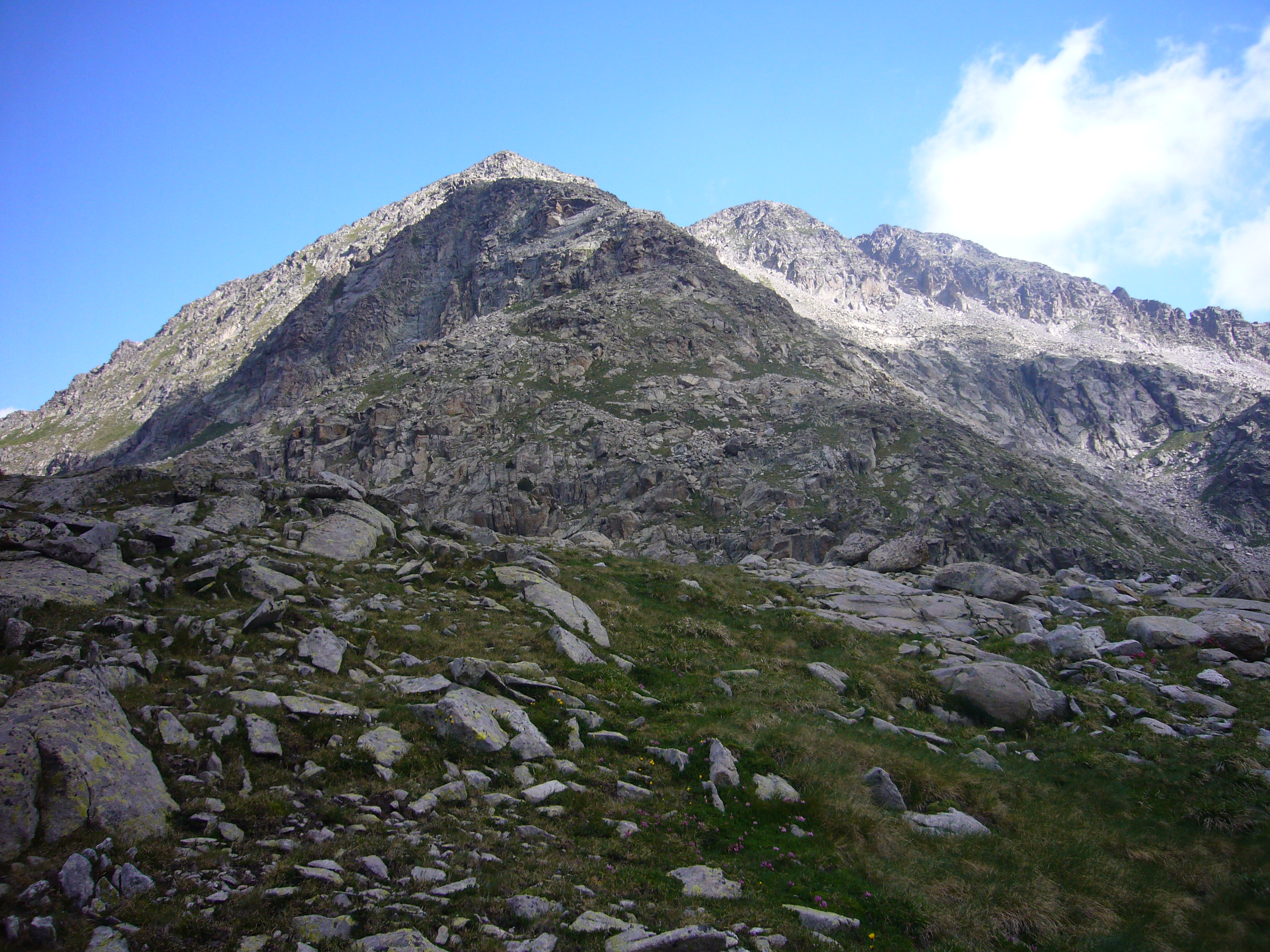

Highest point
- Elevation: 3,014.1 m (9,889 ft)
- Coordinates: 42°35′8.51″N 0°52′49.11″E

Geography
- Location within Catalonia
- Location: Vilaller & Vall de Boí (Alta Ribagorça) Catalonia
- Parent range: Pyrenees

Climbing
- First ascent: Summer 1880 by Schrader and H. Passet
- Easiest route: From Estany de Cavallers

Punta Alta de Comalesbienes, also known as Punta Alta, is a mountain of Catalonia, Spain. Punta Alta has an elevation of 3.014 metres above sea level.

It is located close to the 2993 m high Pic de Comalesbienes, on the eastern side of the Estany de Cavallers glacial lake, near the Besiberri Massif, in the Vall de Boí, Pyrenees.

== See also ==
- List of Pyrenean three-thousanders
- Mountains of Catalonia
