= Besiberri Sud =

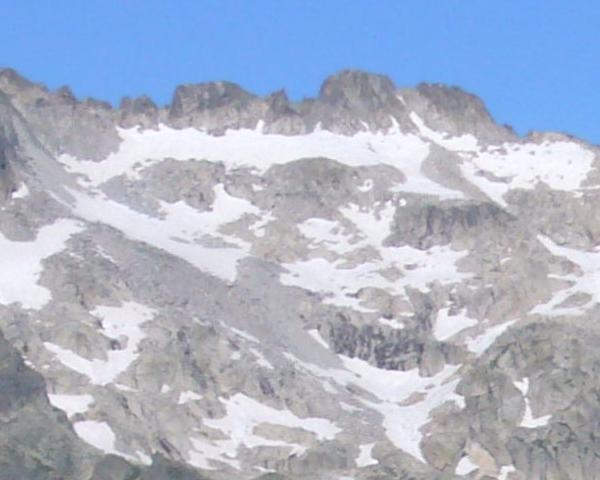
- Besiberri Sud; eastern face

Highest point
- Elevation: 3,023 m (9,918 ft)
- Listing: Mountains in Catalonia
- Coordinates: 42°35′37.62″N 00°49′33.63″E

Geography
- Location within Pyrenees
- Location: Vilaller & Vall de Boí (Alta Ribagorça), Catalonia
- Parent range: Pyrenees

Climbing
- First ascent: Packe & Dashwood, 25 August 1886.
- Easiest route: From the Hospital de Vielha or presa de Cavallers, Vall de Boí

Besiberri Sud is a mountain of the Massís del Besiberri, Catalonia, Spain. Located in the Pyrenees, it has an altitude of 3023.4 metres above sea level.

== See also ==
- Besiberri Nord
- Besiberri del Mig
- Geology of the Pyrenees
