= José Maria Soler (mountaineer) =

Spanish agronomist, mountaineer, and skier

- Born: Josep Maria Soler i Coll; 1893; Catalonia, Spain
- Died: 1971 (aged 77–78); Catalonia, Spain
- Citizenship: Spanish
- Occupations: Agronomist; Mountain climber; Skier
- Known for: First Catalan ascent of Besiberri Nord

José Maria Soler Coll (1893 – 1971) was a Spanish agronomist, mountain climber, and skier.

== Early life and education ==
Born to a family of rural landowners, Soler studied at the Jesuit school of Col·legi Casp in Barcelona, sharing a classroom with Josep Maria de Sagarra.

== Sporting career ==
A lover of sports, he became interested in boxing, golf, and mountaineering, so he initially became a member of the unknown Centre Excursionista de Defensa Social, but shortly after, he changed organizations and became a member for life of the Mountain Sports Section of the Hiking Club of Catalonia (CEC), starting to practice mountaineering around 1916. A keen and fervent skier, he began with long excursions near Barcelona, in the eastern Pyrenees, but soon he also headed towards the central Pyrenees, and together with the brothers Ramir and Isidre Puig, he made the first Catalan ascent of Besiberri Nord on 31 August 1916. Two years later, in 1918, he participated in the first Catalan ascent of Russell Peak, Margalida Peak, and Espatlla d'Aneto, all three peaks located in the Maladeta massif, in the Ribagorça region. He also made several trips to the Alps to visit the main ski schools and learn new techniques to bring them back to Catalonia.

In 1919, Soler, Luis Estasen, and Pau Badia, members of the CEC, made an important mountain crossing on skis from Bagà to Benasque, passing through La Seu d'Urgell, Llavorsí, Esterri d'Àneu, the port of Bonaigua, the Vall d'Aran, and the port of La Picada. This crossing had the support of the president of the Commonwealth of Catalonia Enric Prat de la Riba, and was organized to introduce skis to the inhabitants of the Aran Valley, who were isolated during the winter months.

== Professional career ==
Upon finishing his degree in agriculture with 22 excellent marks, Soler, who remained single throughout his whole life, dedicated himself professionally to the world of agriculture from his role as an agronomist engineer. He worked at the Rural Land Service of the Commonwealth and also at the Higher School of Agriculture, from where he made a famous trip to the Aran Valley, which resulted in an important unpublished monograph that may one day see the light of day.

Soler suffered hardships during the dictatorship of Primo de Rivera and the Second Spanish Republic. He was a member of the CSIC and a collaborator of the FAO, achieving significant prestige in the world of agriculture, genetic selection, and fertilizers.

== Later life and death ==
During the 1930s he was the president of the ski section of the CEC. He died in Catalonia in 1971, at the age of either 77 or 78.

== Legacy ==
In 2015, the writer Francesc Roma i Casanovas published a biography about him in Cossetània Edicions under the title Josep Maria Soler i Coll. Alpinista i agrònom (1893–1971), thus bringing his private, largely unknown mountaineer biography to the public light.
