= Besiberri del Mig =

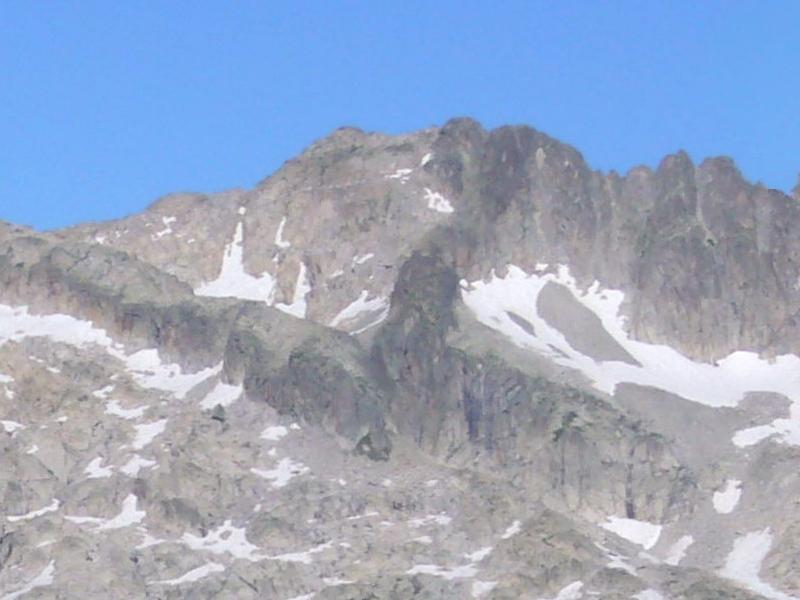
- Besiberri del Mig; eastern face

Highest point
- Elevation: 2,995 m (9,826 ft)
- Listing: Mountains in Catalonia
- Coordinates: 42°35′59.61″N 00°49′29.89″E

Geography
- Location within Pyrenees
- Location: Vilaller & Vall de Boí (Alta Ribagorça), Catalonia
- Parent range: Pyrenees

Climbing
- First ascent: Unknown
- Easiest route: From Estany de Cavallers

Besiberri del Mig is a mountain of the Massís del Besiberri, Catalonia, Spain. Located in the Pyrenees, it has an altitude of 2995.2 metres above sea level.

This mountain has two summits, the Besiberri del Mig N or Pic Simó, 2,995.9 m, and the Besiberri del Mig S or Pic Jolís, 2,995.2 m. It is part of the Parc Nacional d'Aigüestortes i Estany de Sant Maurici protected area.

== See also ==
- Besiberri Sud
- Besiberri Nord
- Geology of the Pyrenees
