= Comaloforno =

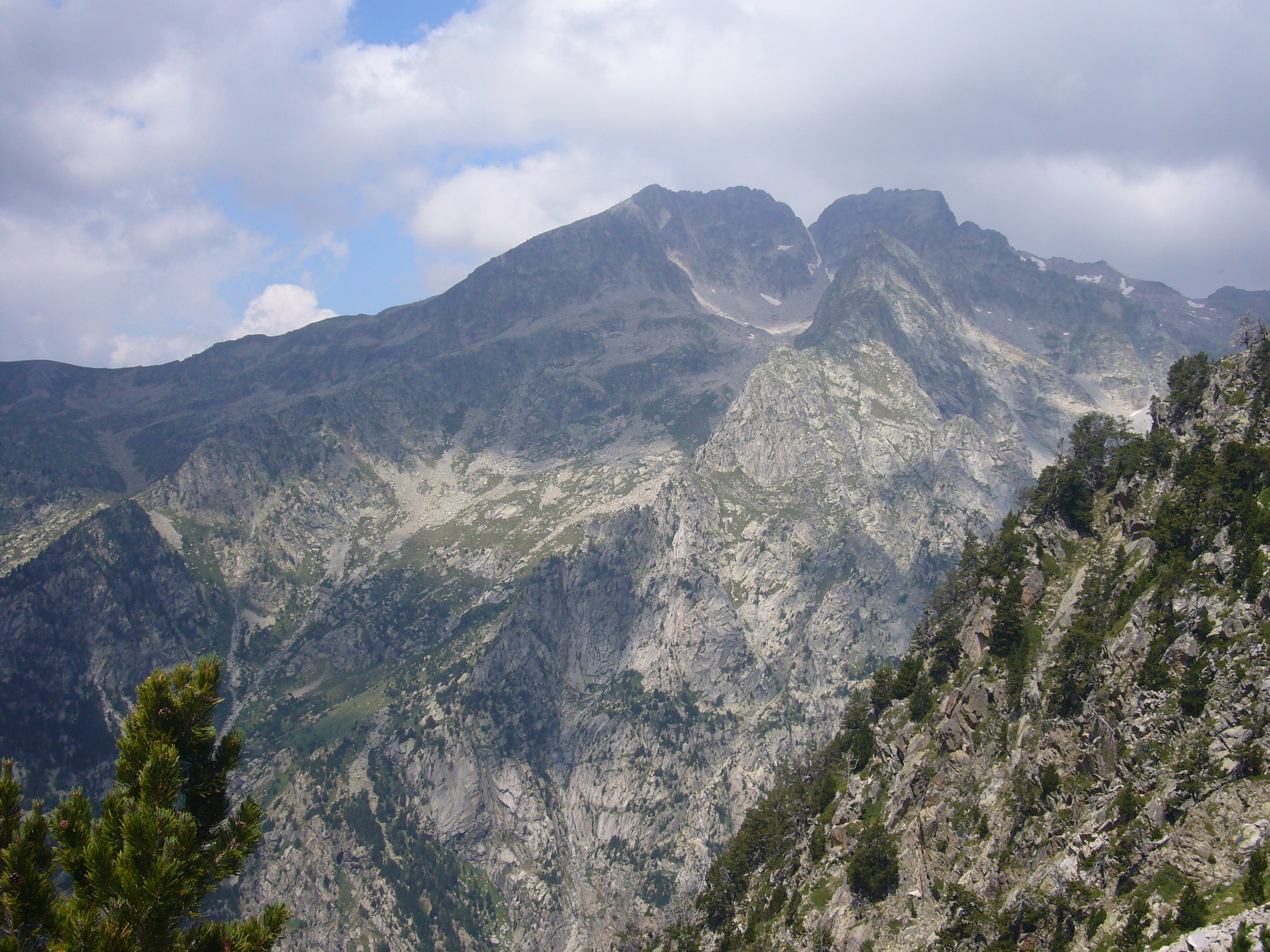

Highest point
- Elevation: 3,029 m (9,938 ft)
- Listing: Mountains in Catalonia
- Coordinates: 42°35′28″N 0°49′40″E

Geography
- Location within Catalonia
- Location: Vall de Boí (Alta Ribagorça) Catalonia
- Parent range: Pyrenees

Climbing
- First ascent: Henry Brulle, Jean Bazillac and Célestin Passet on 25 - VII - 1882.
- Easiest route: From Estany de Cavallers

Comaloforno is a mountain of the Pyrenees, Lleida, Catalonia, Spain. With an elevation of 3,029 metres (9,938 ft) above sea level, it is the highest summit of the Besiberri Massif.

This mountain is within the Aigüestortes i Estany de Sant Maurici National Park.

== See also ==
- List of Pyrenean three-thousanders
