= Besiberri Massif =

Massif in Catalonia, Spain

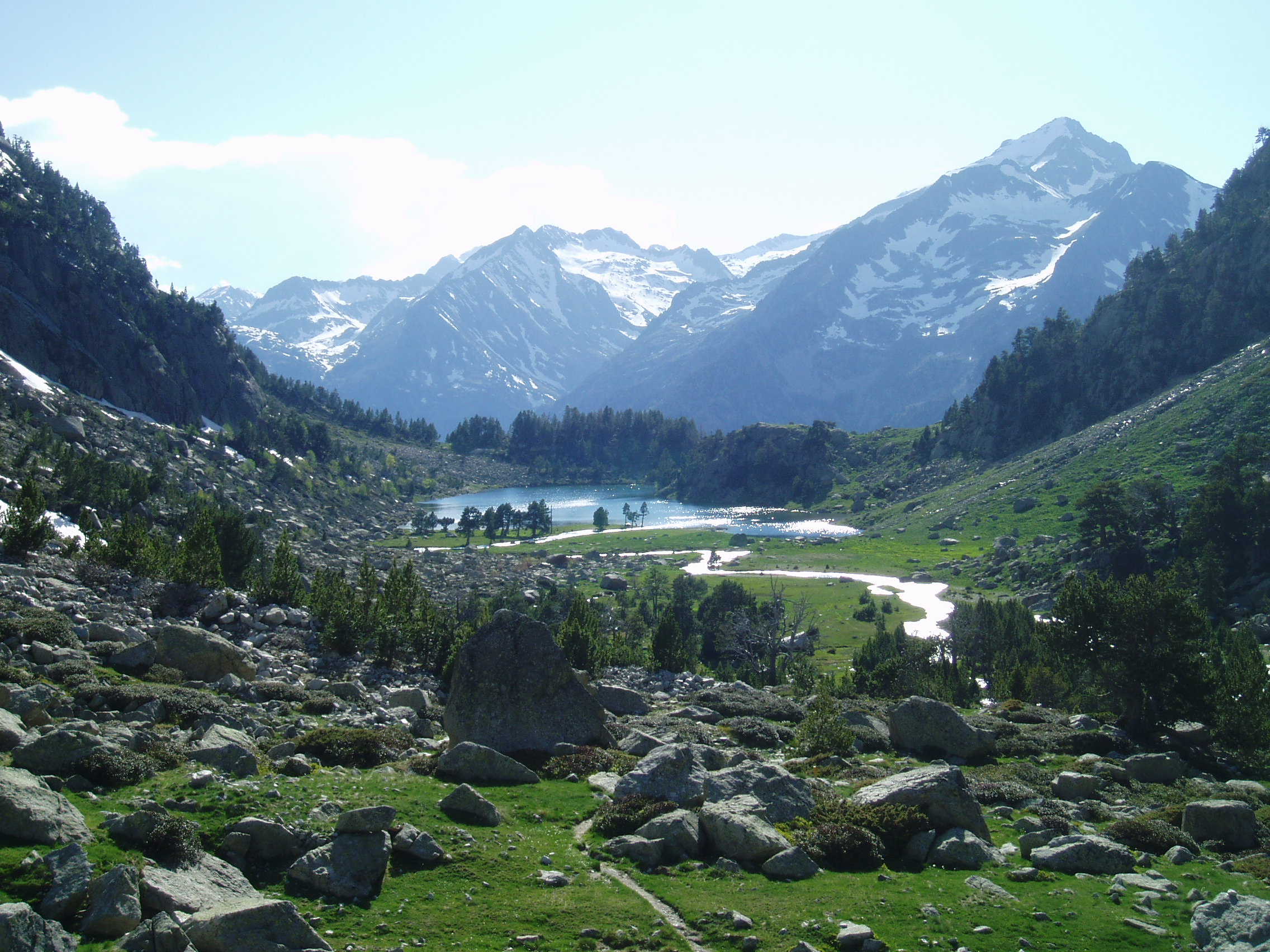
- Glacial lake in the Besiberri Massif

Highest point
- Elevation: 3,029 m (9,938 ft)
- Coordinates: 42°36′01″N 0°49′31″E

Geography
- Location within Catalonia
- Location: Vilaller & Vall de Boí (Alta Ribagorça); Naut Aran (Vall d'Aran); Catalonia
- Parent range: Pyrenees

Climbing
- First ascent: Nils de Barck, Marcel & Henri Spont and J.M. Sansuc, 7 August 1899.
- Easiest route: From Estany de Cavallers

Besiberri Massif (Catalan: Massís del Besiberri) is a mountain massif of the central area of the Pyrenees, Lleida, Catalonia, Spain. It is located at the western limit of the Aigüestortes i Estany de Sant Maurici National Park.

Most main summits of the Besiberri Massif are three-thousanders. The highest point is Comaloforno with an altitude of 3029 metres above sea level. The other main summits are Besiberri Sud (3024 m), Besiberri Nord (3008 m), Besiberri del Mig (2995 m) and Punta Senyalada (2952 m).

== See also ==
- List of Pyrenean three-thousanders
- Geology of the Pyrenees
- Mountains of Catalonia
