= Punta Senyalada =

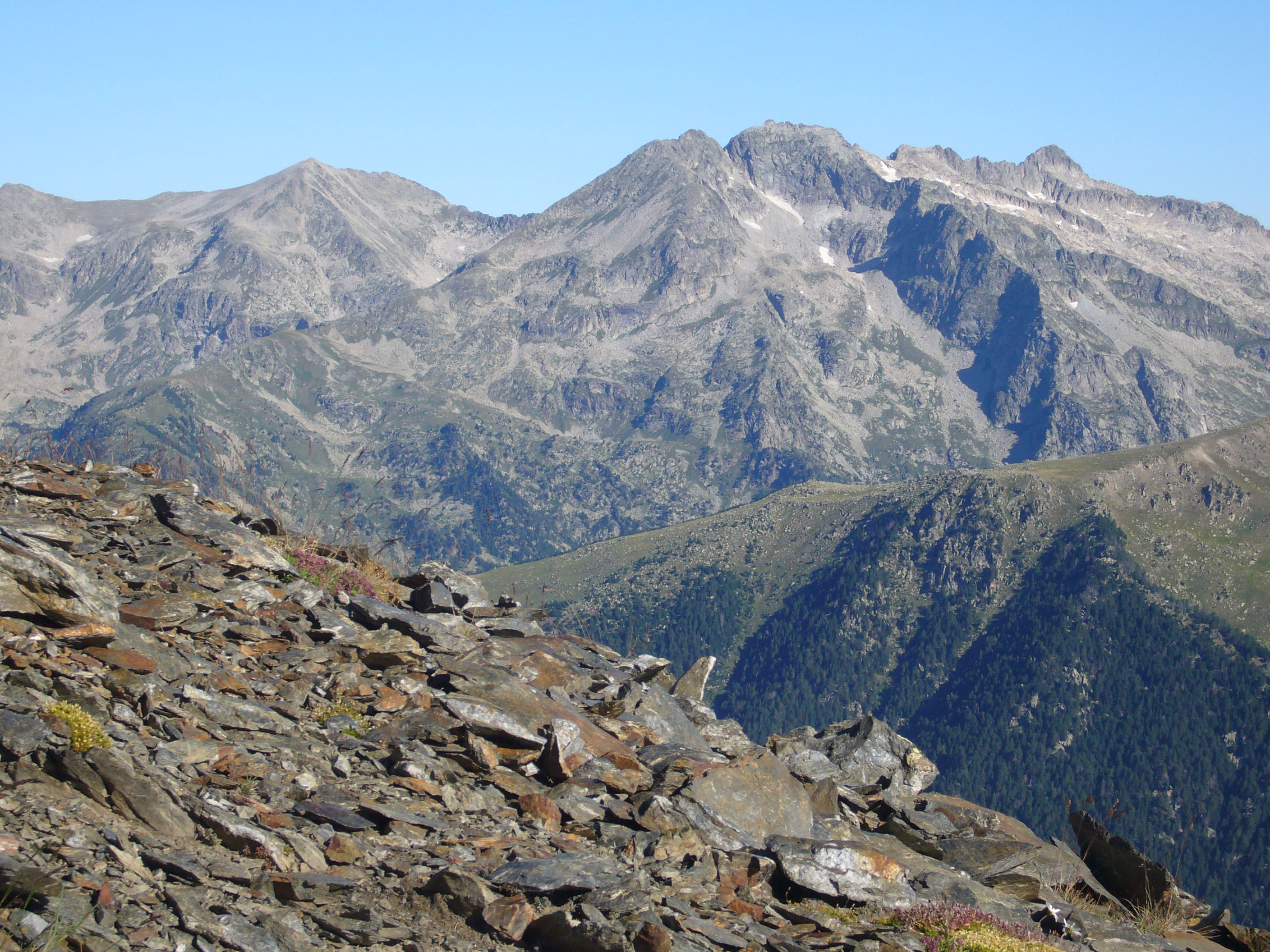
- Punta Senyalada on the left

Highest point
- Elevation: 2,952 m (9,685 ft)
- Coordinates: 42°35′28″N 0°48′30″E

Geography
- Location within Pyrenees
- Location: Vilaller & Vall de Boí (Alta Ribagorça); Naut Aran (Vall d'Aran); Catalonia
- Parent range: Pyrenees

Climbing
- First ascent: Unknown
- Easiest route: From Sallente Reservoir

Punta Senyalada, also known as Pic de la Torreta and Pic dels Soldats, is a mountain of Catalonia, Spain. Located in the Besiberri Massif, Pyrenees, it has an elevation of 2,952 metres above sea level.

== See also ==
- Besiberri Massif
- Mountains of Catalonia
