= Canaveilles Group =

Geological group in France and Spain

The Canaveilles Group is the basal metasedimentary succession of late Neoproterozoic and Cambrian age outcropping in the Pyrenees.

== Etymology ==
The Canaveilles Group, sometimes also called Canaveilles Series, was named after its type locality Canaveilles, a small town in the French department Pyrénées-Orientales.

== Geographical occurrence ==
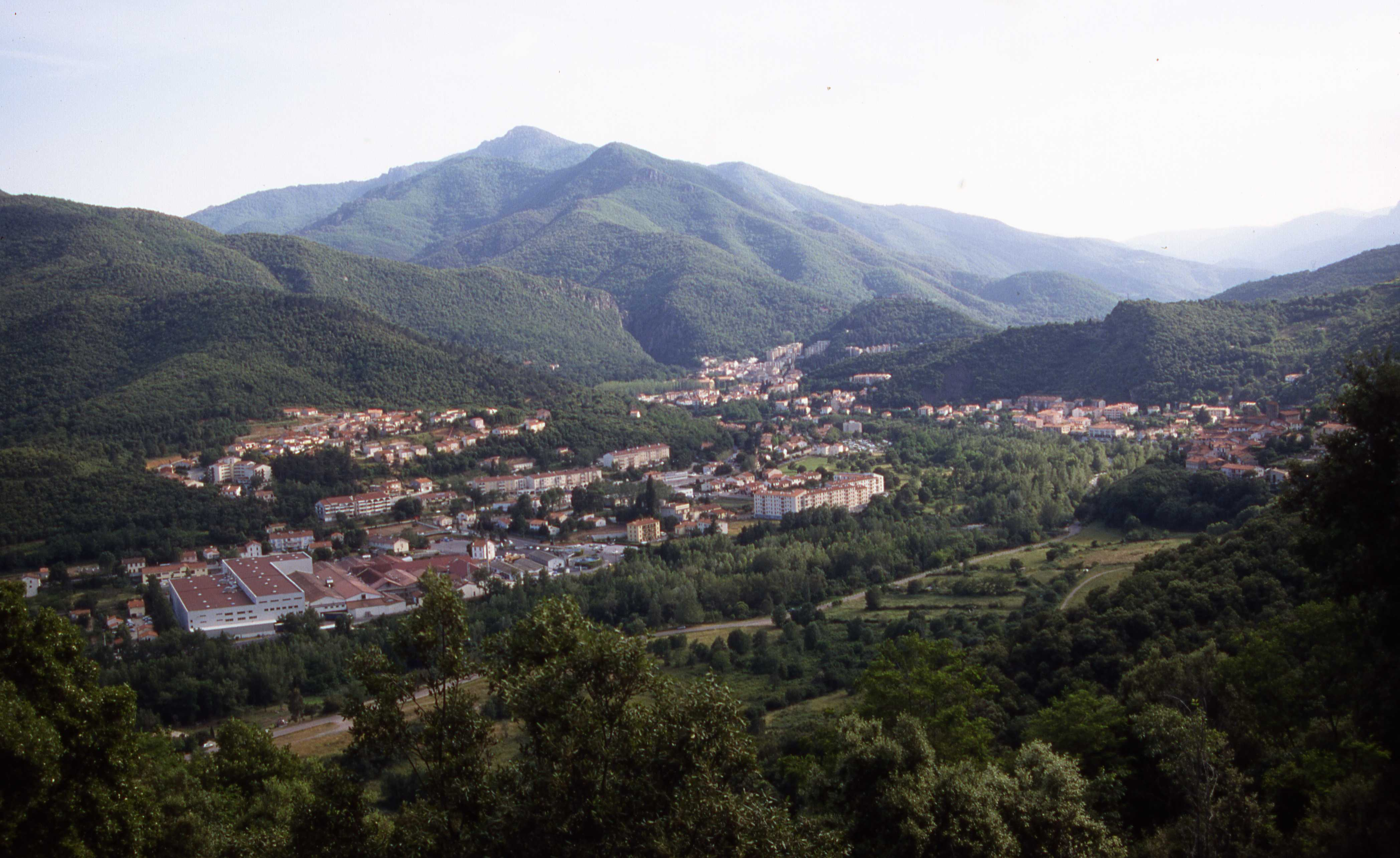
Mount Canigou seen from northwest. The main peak consists of orthogneiss, the slopes on its northwestern side contain the Canaveilles Group.

The areal distribution of the Canaveilles Group centers on the eastern Pyrenees. Further north in the Montagne Noire, the southernmost promontory of the Massif Central, a comparable succession occurs, the la Salvetat-Saint-Pons Series. The Upper Alcudian of the Iberian peninsula also displays great similarities with the Canaveilles Group. The group's main area of distribution focusses on the type locality and the surroundings of Mount Canigou. Yet the group can also be encountered in the Cadí nappe on the Spanish side of the Pyrenees.

== Stratigraphy ==
=== Main sequence ===
At its type locality the marine Canaveilles Group reaches a thickness of 3000 meters, otherwise its thickness varies between 2000 and 4000 meters. On Mount Canigou the group's base overlies leptynitic, so-called “transitional gneisses” with underlying augen gneisses. The group's age reaches back to the Ediacarian, to about 580 million years. Essentially the group consists of shales (with subordinate black shales) and greywackes, intercalated are carbonates and rhyodacites. In the Cadí nappe archeocyathid-bearing limestones occur during the lower Cambrian. With the onset of the middle Cambrian the Canaveilles Group is replaced by the lower metamorphic (greenschist facies conditions, chlorite zone), flyschoid Jujols Group, to be more specific by its basal formation, the olistostrome-rich Tregurà Formation.

=== Carbonate interlayers ===
Within its schists the Canaveilles Group contains at its type locality four carbonate interlayers which have been metamorphosed to marbles and calc schists (from top to bottom):

- calcsilicates
- calcareous marbles
- dolomitic marbles
- basal calcareous marbles

==== Basal calcareous marbles ====
Intercalated at the base of the group are about 150 meters of calcareous marbles (fr. marbres de base). They include five layers of calcareous marble of sometimes massive habit and a layer of impure marbles that has formed from calcarenites. Within the last layer there are gneissic bands reaching ten centimeters and more in thickness; they are composed of calcsilicates and probably represent marly horizons.

==== Dolomitic marbles ====
The fine-grained, grey to cream coloured dolomitic marbles develop the mineral chondrodite. In some layers also clinochlore and phlogopite appear.

Intercalated between the dolomitic marbles and the overlying calcareous marbles are layers of quartzite and greywackes.

==== Calcareous marbles ====
The white, sometimes also greyish calcareous marbles are banded. They display a great variability in thickness. Their normal thickness of about 20 meters can increase in places up to 180 meters. These pronounced variations in thickness indicate a reefal origin of the marbles, most likely as bioherms.

==== Calcsilicates ====
The very fine-grained calcsilicates have a gneissose appearance. They originated from very potassium-rich marbles. They can take on the character of multicoloured (mainly light and greenish colours), banded hornfels. They contain the minerals diopside, tremolite, clinozoisite, basic plagioclase, microcline and microscopic biotite.

At the type locality these calcsilicates form sandy calcschists.

=== Rhyodacites ===
The original rhyodacites (or rhyodacitic tuffs) have been metamorphosed to fine-grained leptynites. Stratigraphically they usually follow after the basal calcareous marbles, but occasionally they can be found somewhat higher above the calcareous marbles. Radiometric age dating on these rhyodacites yielded 581 million years supporting the Ediacarian age of the Canaveilles Group.

== Depositional environment ==
Most likely the Canaveilles Group was deposited during the interval end-Neoproterozoic to lower Cambrian at the northern edge of Gondwana. The sediments are of marine origin and probably were left behind on the continental margin. Possible bioherms within the carbonaceous intercalations and the archeocyathid reefs in the Cadí Nappe point at shelf or shelf edge deposits with some incorporated reefal complexes. The rhyodacites probably were associated with an island arc, so it is possible that the Canaveilles Group was sedimented in a backarc position. This finds support in the group's close relationship with the Alcudian of central Iberia, a 15 kilometer! thick, strongly subsident Neoproterozoic sedimentary succession formed along a transform fault traversing the active northern margin of Gondwana.

== Metamorphism ==
During the Variscan orogeny in the Pennsylvanian about 310 million years ago the sediments of the Canaveilles Group were metamorphosed under mesozonal conditions (amphibolite facies). The original shales transformed into mica schists of the cordierite, andalusite and sillimanite zone in the lower part of the section, higher up they only converted to greenschist facies phyllites of the biotite zone. The carbonaceous intercalations became marbles and calcsilicates. Close to the contact with the “transitional gneiss” first the andalusite isograd is reached, followed by the cordierite isograd. This indicates a magmatic origin of the gneisses formed from intrusive granitoids.

== Magmatism ==
The sedimentary succession of the Canaveilles Group often is crosscut by dikes of two-mica granite and associated pegmatites. These dikes form part of the deep-seated Canigou granite. They intrude mainly the basal calcareous marbles and the dolomitic marbles, but can also be found higher up-section. In the lower section diorites and quartz diorites sometimes occur. All these granitoid intrusions developed after the formation of the nappe structures towards the end of the Variscan orogeny.

== Structural development ==
During the Variscan orogeny the Canaveilles Group was not only metamorphosed but also strongly deformed. In the Canigou Massif the group's metasediments together with the gneisses and the augengneisses were folded into a gigantic flat-lying isoclinal fold. Due to shearing in the fold limbs two nappe units formed which were later deformed plastically (internal folding) and buckled anticlinally. Upon reaching the brittle regime the continuing shortening led to thrusting and backthrusting (especially along the south side of Mount Canigou).

Since several revisions of the intrusion age of the orthogneisses now all find a lower Ordovician age of 474 million years for the last crystallisation on zircons, the concept of a Cadomian basement has become highly questionable. This also casts doubts on the presumed isoclinal fold structure, yet the nappes and later deformations rest established.

A further consequence of the intrusive character of the orthogneisses resides in the fact, that the underlying paragneisses, once considered to be also of Cadomian age, now have to be attributed to the Canaveilles Group. Most likely these metagreywackes only have undergone a higher degree of metamorphism.

== Sources ==
- Jaffrezo, M. (1977). Pyrénées Orientales Corbières. Guides géologiques régionaux. Masson. ISBN 2-225-47290-4
