= Besiberri Nord =

Mountain in Spain

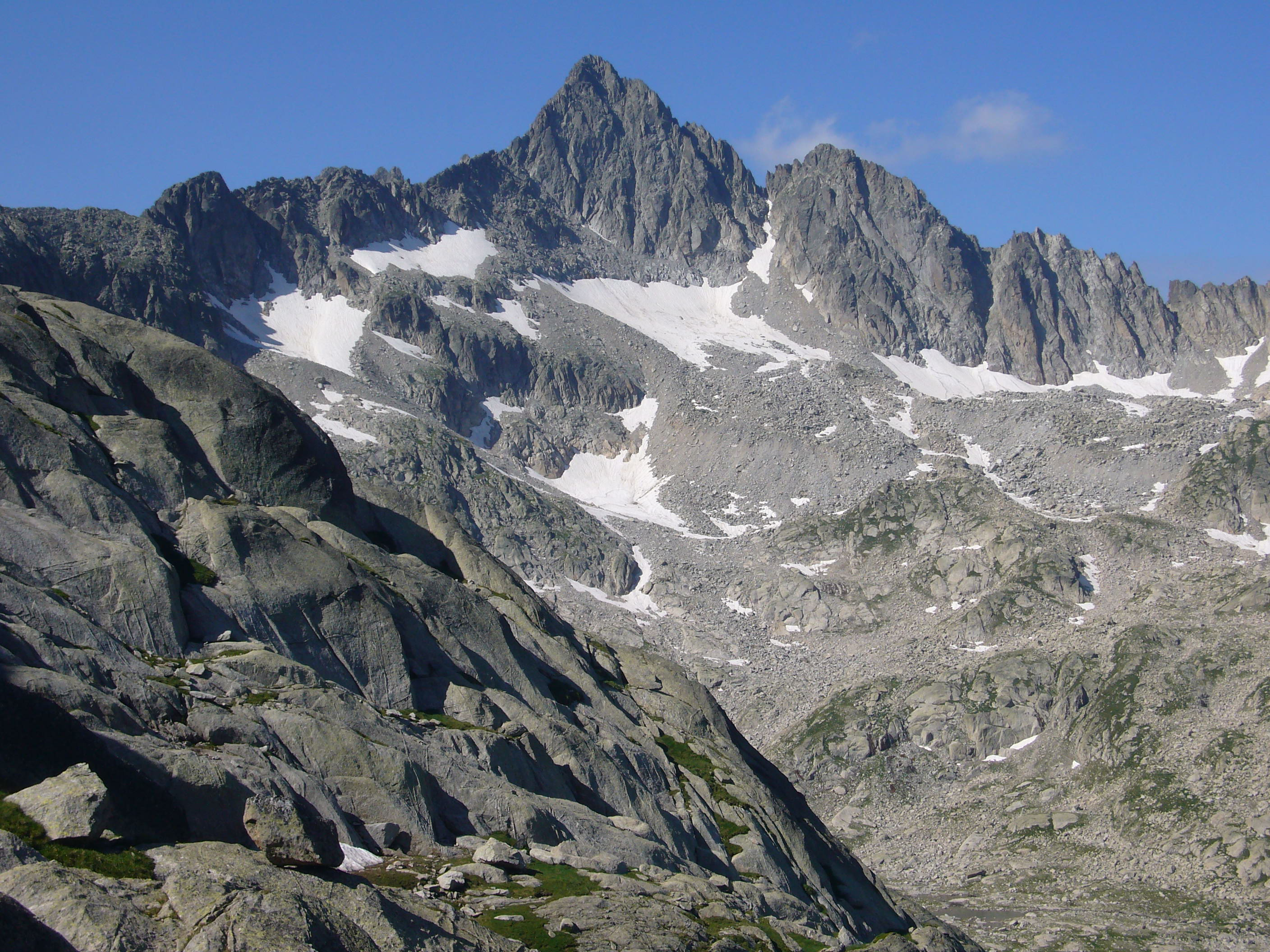

Highest point
- Elevation: 3,009 m (9,872 ft)
- Listing: Mountains in Catalonia
- Coordinates: 42°36′19.01″N 00°49′34.70″E

Geography
- Location within Catalonia
- Location: Vilaller & Vall de Boí (Alta Ribagorça); Naut Aran (Vall d'Aran); Catalonia
- Parent range: Pyrenees

Climbing
- First ascent: Nils de Barck, Marcel & Henri Spont and J.M. Sansuc, 7 August 1899.
- Easiest route: From Estany de Cavallers

Besiberri Nord is a mountain of the Massís del Besiberri, Catalonia, Spain. Located in the Pyrenees, it has an altitude of 3009 metres above sea level.

== See also ==
- Besiberri Sud
- Besiberri del Mig
- Geology of the Pyrenees
