= Ebro Basin =

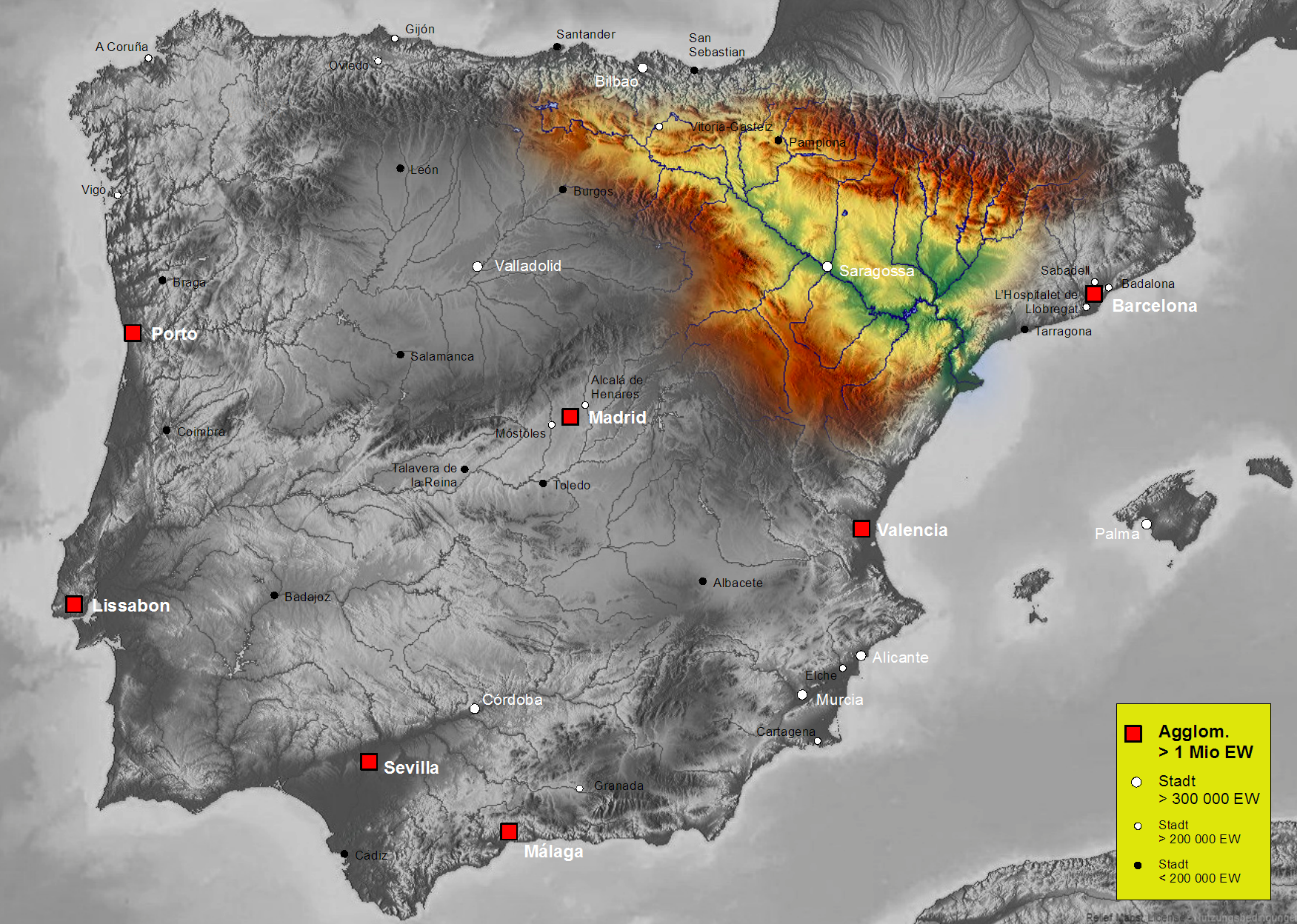
Map of Ebro river basin in Spain

The Ebro Basin, the drainage basin of the River Ebro, encompasses much of the northeast quarter of the Iberian Peninsula, in Spain. It formed during the Paleogene as a foreland marine basin to the south of the Pyrenees with connections to both the Atlantic Ocean and the Mediterranean Sea, limited to the southeast by the Catalan Coastal Ranges. During the Late Eocene it became an endorheic basin, with no connections to either sea. In the Miocene the basin was captured by a precursor to the Ebro river and the new drainage system that developed eroded away much of the basin fill, except for resistant lithologies, such as the conglomerates at Montserrat.
