= Mouthoumet =

Commune in Occitanie, France

- Commune
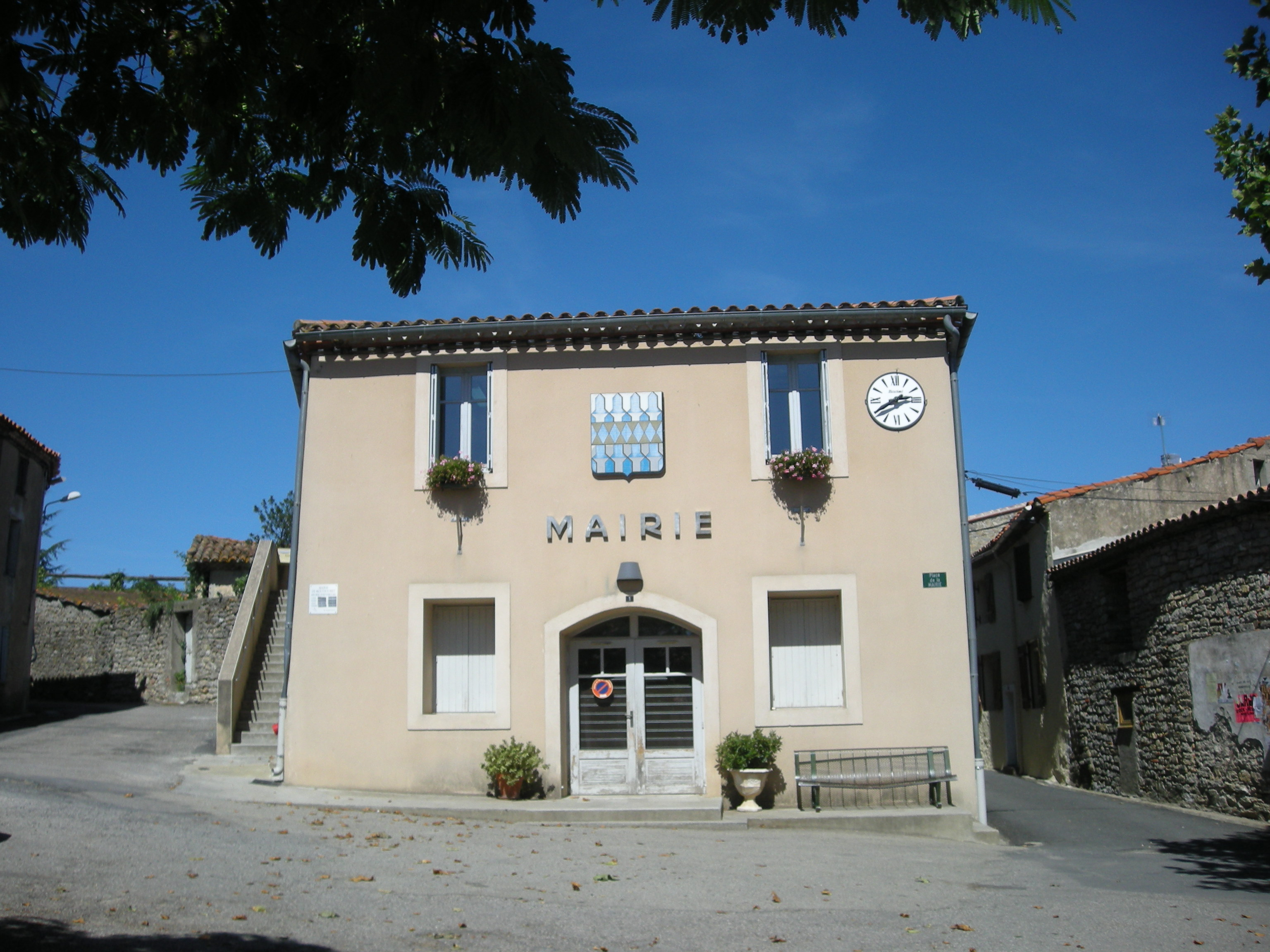
- The town hall in Mouthoumet

- Coat of arms
- Location of Mouthoumet
- Location within France Location within Occitanie
- Coordinates: 42°57′39″N 2°31′39″E
- Country: France
- Region: Occitania
- Department: Aude
- Arrondissement: Narbonne
- Canton: Les Corbières

Government
  - Mayor (2020–2026): Christelle Hermand
- Area^{1}: 13.73 km^{2} (5.30 sq mi)
- Highest elevation: 704 m (2,310 ft)
- Lowest elevation: 400 m (1,300 ft)
- Population (2023): 116
  - Density: 8.45/km^{2} (21.9/sq mi)
- Time zone: UTC+01:00 (CET)
  - Summer (DST): UTC+02:00 (CEST)
- INSEE/Postal code: 11260 /11330
- ^{1} French Land Register data, which excludes lakes, ponds, glaciers > 1 km^{2} (0.386 sq mi or 247 acres) and river estuaries.

Mouthoumet (French pronunciation: [mutumɛ]; Languedocien: Motomet) is a commune in the Aude department in southern France.

== Population ==
Historical population
Year	Pop.	±% p.a.
1968	92	—
1975	71	−3.63%
1982	102	+5.31%
1990	65	−5.48%
1999	86	+3.16%
2007	105	+2.53%
2012	122	+3.05%
2017	107	−2.59%
2023	116	+1.36%
Source: INSEE

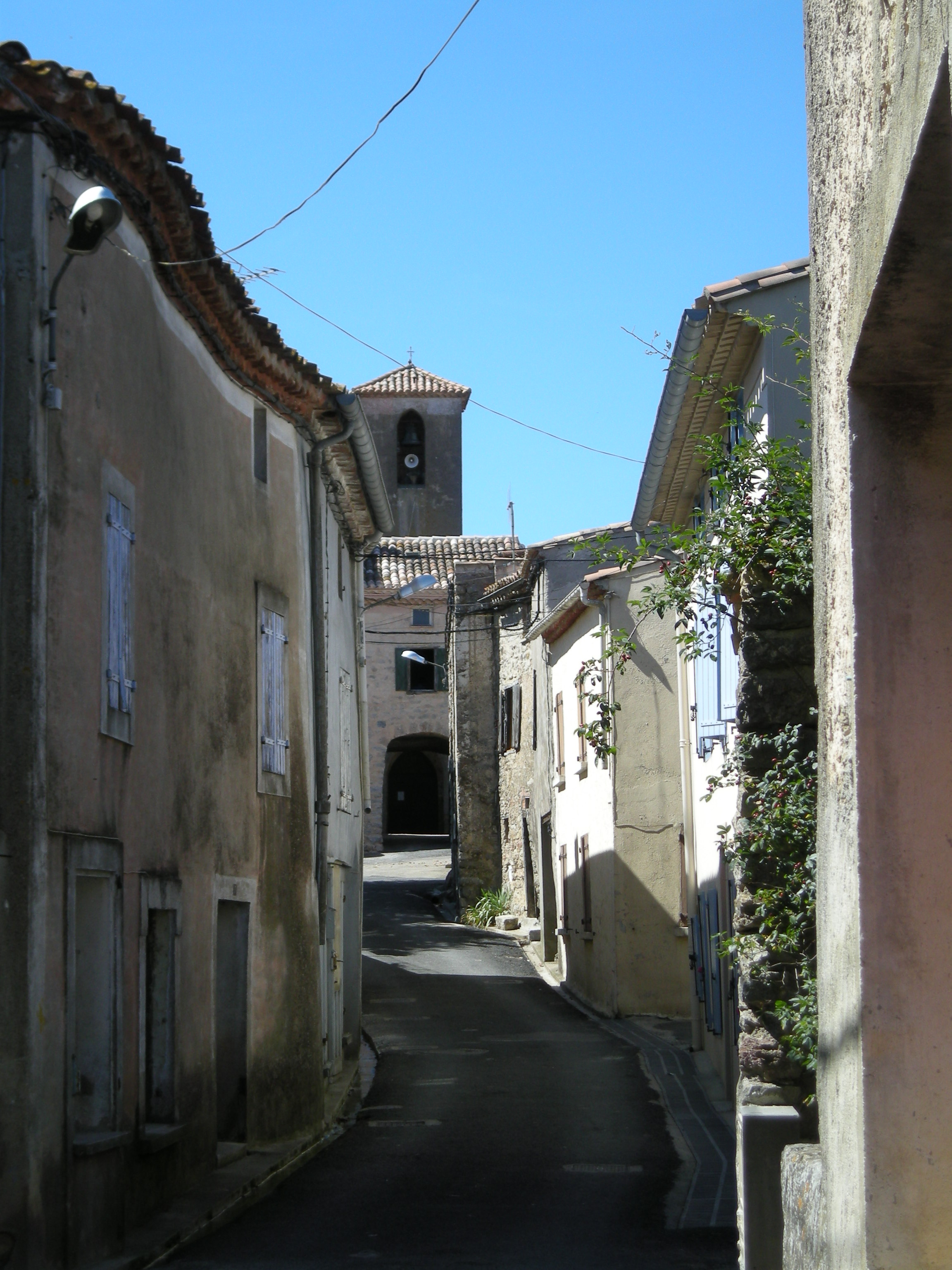

== See also ==
- Corbières Massif
- Communes of the Aude department
