= Geology of the Pyrenees =

European regional geology

Geological cross-section of the Pyrenees

The Pyrenees are a 430-kilometre-long, roughly east–west striking, intracontinental mountain chain that divide France, Spain, and Andorra. The belt has an extended, polycyclic geological evolution dating back to the Precambrian. The chain's present configuration is due to the collision between the Iberian microcontinent and the southwestern promontory of the European plate (i.e. Southern France). The two continents were approaching each other since the onset of the Upper Cretaceous (Albian/Cenomanian) about 100 million years ago and were consequently colliding during the Paleogene (Eocene/Oligocene) 55 to 25 million years ago. After its uplift, the chain experienced intense erosion and isostatic readjustments. A cross-section through the chain shows an asymmetric flower-like structure with steeper dips on the French side. The Pyrenees are not solely the result of compressional forces, but also show an important sinistral shearing.

== Geographic arrangement ==
The Pyrenees sensu stricto stretch in a west-northwest-east-southeast-direction (N 110) over 430 km from the Bay of Biscay in the west to the Golfe du Lion and the Golf de Roses in the east, their width across strike varying between 65 and 150 km. They are bounded in the north by the North Pyrenean Front (French: Front nord-pyrénéen, also North Pyrenean frontal fault or NPFF), a major thrust fault along which units from the North Pyrenean Zone have been transported over the Subpyrenean Zone, southernmost part of the Aquitaine Basin, their northern foreland. Their southern limit is the South Pyrenean Frontal Fault. Here, thrust slices from the Sierras Marginales and their lateral equivalents are displaced southward over the Ebro Basin.

Yet in a larger, geologically more meaningful sense the Pyrenees continue farther west into the Basque and the Cantabrian Mountains (the Basque-Cantabrian chain). They finally disappear along the continental margin of Asturias. Likewise in the east, they do not just vanish in the Mediterranean but rather pursue their course via the nappe units of the Corbières Massif into Bas Languedoc and even into southern Provence. At their far eastern end in Provence, typical Pyrenean fold trends are superimposed by Alpine structures to be finally cut off by the arc of the Western Alps. The Pyrenean chain in the larger sense is nearly 1000 km long.

== Structural organisation of the orogen ==
A profile through the Pyrenees sensu stricto shows a fan-like, flower-like arrangement. The structure is strongly asymmetric with a steeper and narrower French northern side and a much wider and more gently inclined Spanish southern side.

The double-sided orogen can be divided into several tectonic zones, from north to south, that are bounded by east–west-trending major faults:

- Northern foreland – Aquitaine Basin
- Subpyrenean zone or Subpyrenean Basin
- North Pyrenean zone
- Axial zone
- South Pyrenean zone
- Sierras Marginales
- Southern foreland – Ebro Basin

Along strike, the pyrenean orogen can be split into three distinct domains: an eastern domain reaching from the Mediterranean to the Segre River, a central domain extending from the Segre River to the Pamplona Fault, and a western domain beyond the Pamplona Fault.

=== Subpyrenean Zone ===
The Subpyrenean Zone is geologically part of the Aquitaine Basin, the northern foreland of the Pyrenees, and was caught up in the Pyrenean orogeny. The zone was folded during the Eocene and overthrust en echelon by the North Pyrenean Zone along the North Pyrenean Front. These upthrusts change their character in the west and in the east of the orogen, where they become nappe-like, examples being the Bas Adour Nappe in the west and the Corbières Nappe in the east. The latter continues farther east via folds and tectonic slices near Saint-Chinian, via the fold near Montpellier to join the South Provence Thrust near Sainte-Baume, which gradually disappears south of Brignoles.

Within the Pyrenees sensu stricto, the Subpyrenean Zone consists of Upper Cretaceous and very thick Paleogene sediments in surface outcrops. The sediments show simple folds following a WNW-ESE trend.

The subsurface, however, has a far more complicated structure due to Triassic salt diapirs and north-vergent thrusts. Hidden below a more than 6000 metre thick Mesozoic cover are probably more than 6000 m of Paleozoic basement rocks. The Mesozoic cover consists of up to 1500 m of Triassic, well over 500 m of Jurassic and more than 3000 m of Cretaceous sediments.

The up to 500 m thick layer of Lower Triassic (Buntsandstein) comprises conglomerates, breccia, brown sandstones, argillites, shales, and siltstones. The Middle Triassic (Muschelkalk) can attain a thickness of 400 m and shows silty shales, evaporite deposits, and dolomitic micrites. The up to 500 m thick Upper Triassic Keuper deposits are made up of carbonate-rich sediments, salt, siltstones, and intercalated ophitic diabases/olivine dolerites. The lower Lias is a transgressive sequence with up to 200 m of non-marine sandstone, near-shore marine limestone and evaporites. A pelagic fauna at the top suggests open marine conditions. The middle and upper Lias consist of 230 m of shallow marine platform sediments (bioclastic limestone, argillaceous limestone, and micritic limestone). During the Middle Jurassic, an oolitic barrier, made up mostly of argillaceous micrites, separates an outer shelf from an inner shelf. The Upper Jurassic (Malm) deposits are mainly shales and carbonates. Near the end of the Jurassic, restricted environments were established with dolomicrites, banded limestones, and evaporites. The Lower Cretaceous layer starts with sandstones, shales, limestones, and calcareous breccia in the Neocomian, followed by Barremian marls and limestones. During the lower Aptian, sandstones, shales, sandy marls, and limestones were laid down. The upper Aptian and the Albian are mainly marls and limestones. The Upper Cretaceous includes a littoral Turonian with sandstones and sandy limestones. By the beginning of the Senonian (Campanian), a deep trough had formed (the Subpyrenean Basin) receiving a very thick flysch sequence. The Campanian and Maastrichtian flysches comprise 2000 to 3000 m of periodically interlayered fines (marls, calcareous shales, and mudstones) and coarser sediments (conglomerates, sandstones, and greywackes). Near the K/T boundary, the Subpyrenean Basin was filled with continental red deposits in Garumnian facies even including dinosaur eggs in a few places. At this point, the Subpyrenean Basin underwent folding accompanied by a weak metamorphism.

Above the Albian and before the onset of the Campanian, volcanic rocks occur including basaltic lavas, spilite, and diabase, but also pyroclastic rocks like tuff, lapilli tuff, volcanic breccia, and agglomerate. The volcanic rocks can be cross-cut by lamprophyre dikes.

In Paleocene/Eocene times, the sea transgressed from the Atlantic into the Subpyrenean Basin which behaved as a downwarp to the slowly rising Pyrenees immediately to the south. A very thick (2000 to 3000 m) succession of fine-grained detrital or calcareous sediments was deposited. The sedimentation stopped in the late Eocene due to major compression (Pyrenean main phase).

In the vicinity of the Muret Fault, a left-lateral strike-slip fault and a prolongation of the Toulouse Fault to the south, the Subpyrenean Zone can be divided into two unequal halves. The eastern half between the rivers Garonne and Aude can be separated into three different zones (from north to south):

- a northern foreland.
- a 10 km wide folded zone. Its northern boundary are the ranges of the Petits Pyrénées, which are above a blind thrust. This zone narrows to the east and disappears before reaching the Aude. The sediments comprise a gypsum–bearing Triassic at the bottom followed by an internally thrusted Jurassic and a very thick cover sequence of Upper Cretaceous flysch sediments.
- a narrow band of flysch in the south. This fairly thick flysch sequence was also deposited in the Upper Cretaceous. It was upturned into a nearly upright position by thrusting movements on the North Pyrenean Front and now forms the overturned southern flank of an asymmetric syncline.

In the western half, only the northern foreland is present; it is made up of gently folded, but strongly jointed, epicontinental Mesozoic sediments covered and hidden by Miocene molasse sediments. The east–west and northwest–southeast-striking fold sets interfere and are cut by northeast-trending faults. In the subsurface, Triassic salt diapirs are also present.

Within the northern foreland east of the river Aude, the Paleozoic basement uplift of the Mouthoumet appears, a horst tilted to the south and covered by continental Eocene strata.

The fold trains of the Subpyrenean Zone are disrupted in the Bas Languedoc by the Cevennes Fault, a major left-lateral strike-slip fault.

=== North Pyrenean Zone ===
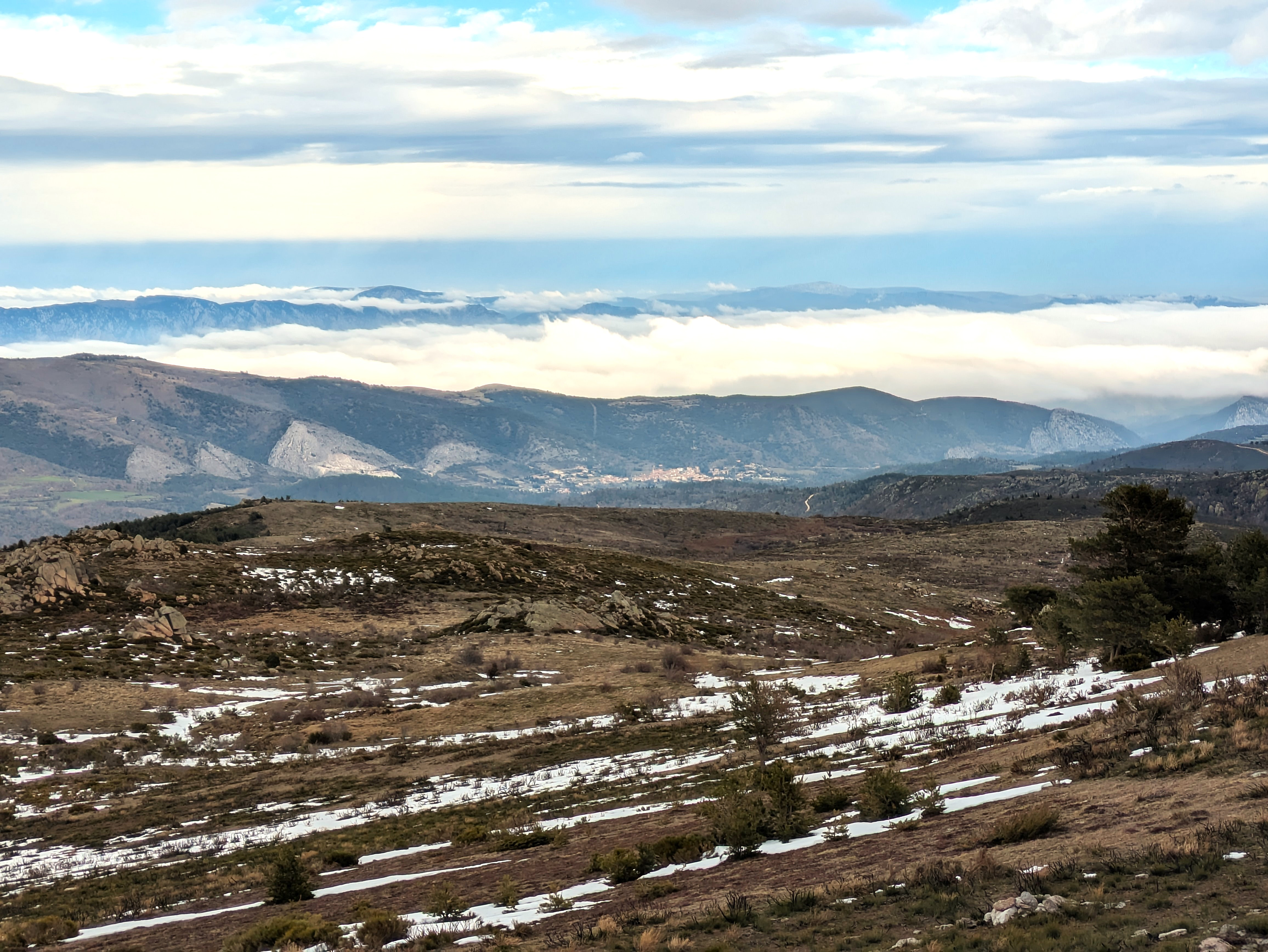
The North Pyrenean Fault extends from left to right across this image, passing through the town of Sournia (Pyrénées-Orientales), visible in the distance. Hercynian granite of the axial zone is visible in the foreground; Cretaceous formations of the North Pyrenean zone form the hills behind Sournia.

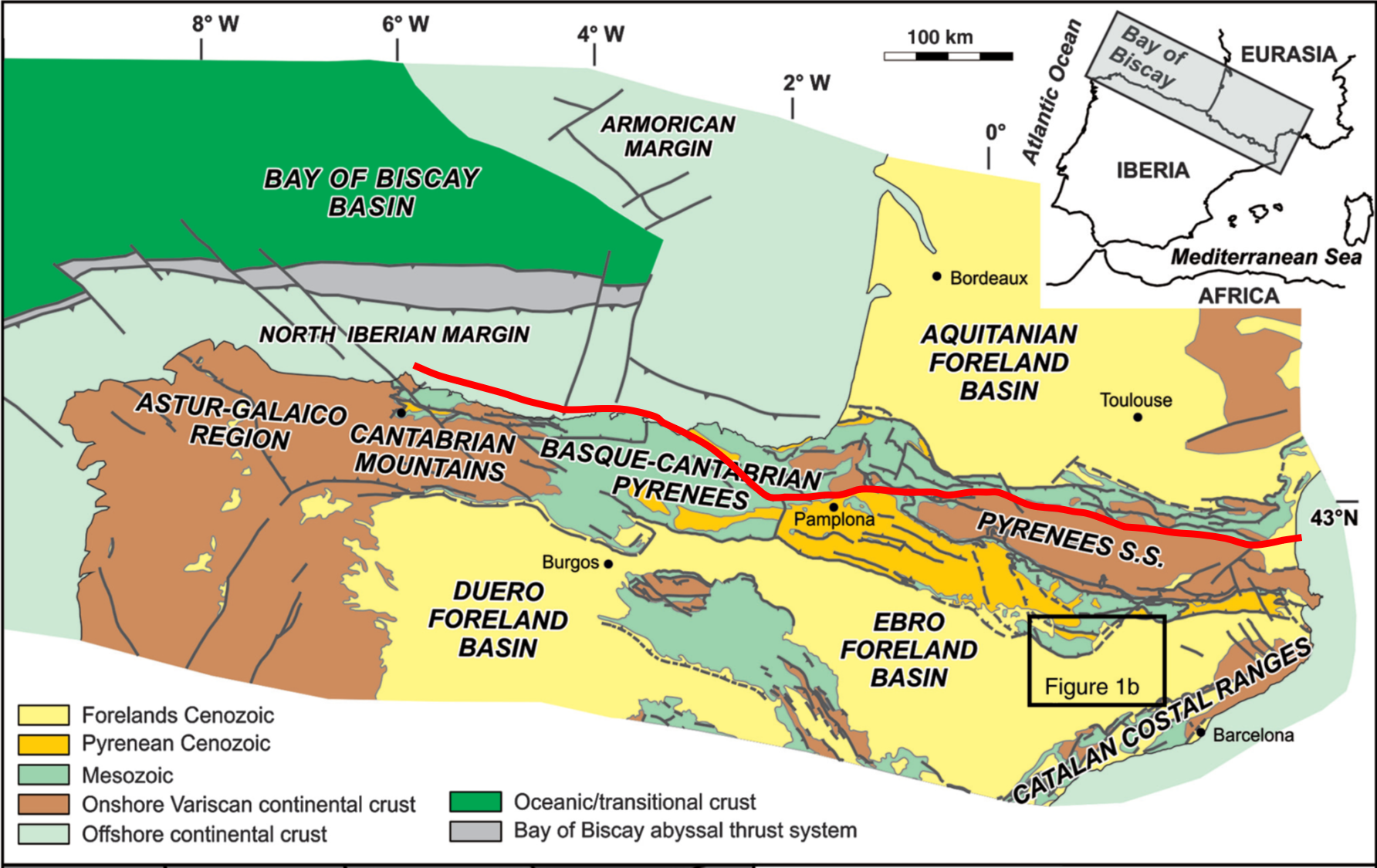
Location of the North Pyrenean Fault (red line). Sournia is towards the eastern end of the fault line.

The North Pyrenean Zone is quite narrow, usually only about 10 km wide, but can widen to 40 km. It is characterised by very strong folding. The zone is thrust to the north along the North Pyrenean Front—its northern limit—over the Subpyrenean Zone. This thrusting motion compressed the overthrust foreland and as a result induced folding in the Subpyrenean Zone. The North Pyrenean Zone is itself overthrust by the axial zone along the North Pyrenean Fault (NPF), a high-angle reverse-fault forming its southern boundary. The North Pyrenean Fault is marked by highly strained mylonites. The rocks in the vicinity bear horizontal lineations underlining the importance of the fault as a major shear zone. Elsewhere in the North Pyrenean Zone, the strain gradient is also high but the stretching direction is generally vertical.

The more than 6000 m thick sedimentary package of the North Pyrenean Zone is formed by Mesozoic (Jurassic and Cretaceous) rocks that have been detached above Upper Triassic evaporites and subsequently slid to the north. In contrast with the Subpyrenean Zone, the North Pyrenean Zone contains hardly any Paleogene. Upper Triassic (Keuper) shale and evaporite deposits locally contain interbedded dolomites, tuffs, and diabase (ophites); these deposits behave plastically and commonly form a tectonic mélange with contacts being expressed as decollement surfaces. From the beginning of the Jurassic till the end of the Lower Cretaceous, a shallow-water carbonate platform developed during tectonic quiescence with mainly limestones being sedimented. The Middle Albian witnessed a major facies change to deep marine conditions. This changeover marks the inception of the North Pyrenean Basin, a 400 km long trough of pull-apart origin filled with unconformable, turbiditic flysch sediments during the Upper Cretaceous. By Upper Albian times, this pull-apart basin had split into an internal trough next to the North Pyrenean fault which accommodated the Flysch ardoisier and an external trough farther north filled by the Flysch noir. Later, during the Turonian and the Coniacian, the external flysch trough received the so-called Flysch à fucoides, a very thick succession of interbedded calcareous mudstones/marlstones and sandy calcarenites. This flysch is followed by a regressive series in the Maastrichtian—thick marls (Marnes de Plagne)—platform limestones (Calcaires nankins), as well as lagoonal and lacustrine deposits. Altogether the Coniacian-Maastrichtian series reaches a thickness of 3000 m.

The Paleozoic basement pierces the sedimentary cover in several almond-shaped, horst-like uplifts, their size ranging from 1 to 300 km^{2}. Examples are the so-called massifs satellites nord-pyrénéens (north pyrenean basement uplifts) between Lourdes and Perpignan, amongst them the following uplifts: Agly, Arize, Barousse, Bessède-de-Sault, Castillon, Milhas, Plantach, Saint-Barthélémy, Salvezines, and Rabat-les-Trois-Seigneurs, plus several uplifts in the northern Basque country. These uplifts have a left-lateral shearing origin and are tilted to the north; simultaneously they also exhibit a vertical shearing component. They probably formed in the Variscan orogeny. In the basement uplifts, mainly Precambrian gneisses and granulitic gneisses (in the Agly massif), and Paleozoic igneous and metamorphic rocks are found.

A small, maximally 5 km wide strip just north of the North Pyrenean Fault experienced dynamic and thermal metamorphism during the Albian/Cenomanian about 110 million years ago (high temperature/low pressure, "HT/LP"-type). Some domains north of the basement uplifts were also metamorphosed (e.g. in the Bigorre and in the southern Corbières). The metamorphism was isochemical without introduction of extraneous elements and affected only the sedimentary cover rocks which were transformed into marble and hornfels. The Paleozoic basement was not affected, probably due to its already dehydrated state.

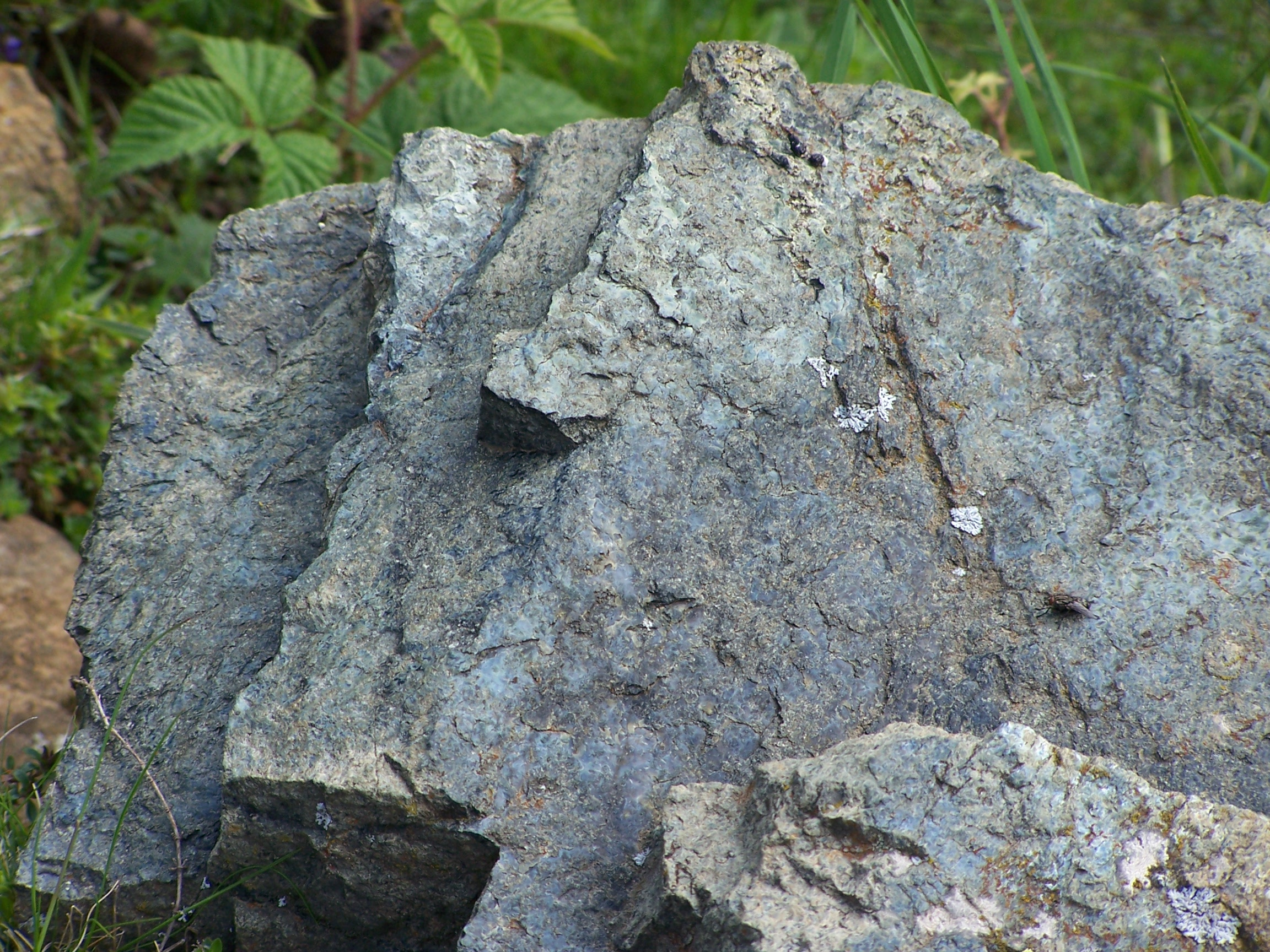
Lherzolite from the North Pyrenean Zone, L'Étang de Lers, Ariège

Scattered within the metamorphic strip are several occurrences of lherzolites (including their type locality at Lers). They were extruded from the upper mantle along deep-reaching faults. The lherzolites are associated with amphibolites, pyroxenites, and amphibole-bearing peridotites. All these mantle rocks are arranged in swarms, the biggest outcrop at Moncaup reaching a mere 3 km^{2}. They are widely distributed, being found from Béarn all the way to Aude. Their emplacement mode has not been clarified yet, but the following factors are relevant:

- associated Jurassic and lower Cretaceous marbles of the metamorphic band.
- granulites of the basement uplifts in the vicinity.
- migmatitic kinzigites.
- the close spatial association with the North Pyrenean Fault a bit farther south.
- lherzolite sedimentary clasts occur in marbles of the metamorphic strip, so the lherzolites must be older than the metamorphism.

Scattered within the North Pyrenean Zone are also some occurrences of volcanic rocks. They are intercalated in sediments of the Lias and the Upper Cretaceous (Aptian till Campanian) and are found mainly in the west (near Tarbes, Orthez, and in the Basque country). They consist of silica undersaturated spilites, picrites, and nepheline syenites. Associated dike rocks are lamprophyres (camptonites and monchiquites).

Other features of interest are several different post-metamorphic breccia formations.

The North Pyrenean Zone can be subdivided into three subzones bounded by major faults:

- a northern subzone. Its sedimentary cover has detached from the basement uplifts farther south. It contains flysch from the Upper Cretaceous.
- an intermediate subzone. Here the basement uplifts crop out.
- a southern subzone. It was affected by metamorphism and contains outcrops of ultramafic rocks.

The North Pyrenean Zone is traversed in the west by NNE-SSW-trending, left-lateral strike-slip faults and then changes into the fold-belt of the Basque country. In the east, it continues after a sharp bend in the Corbières right into southern Provence. At the far eastern end, northwest–southeast-striking Miocene fold trains of the Western Alps start interfering and finally completely overwhelm the pyrenean structures.

=== Axial zone ===
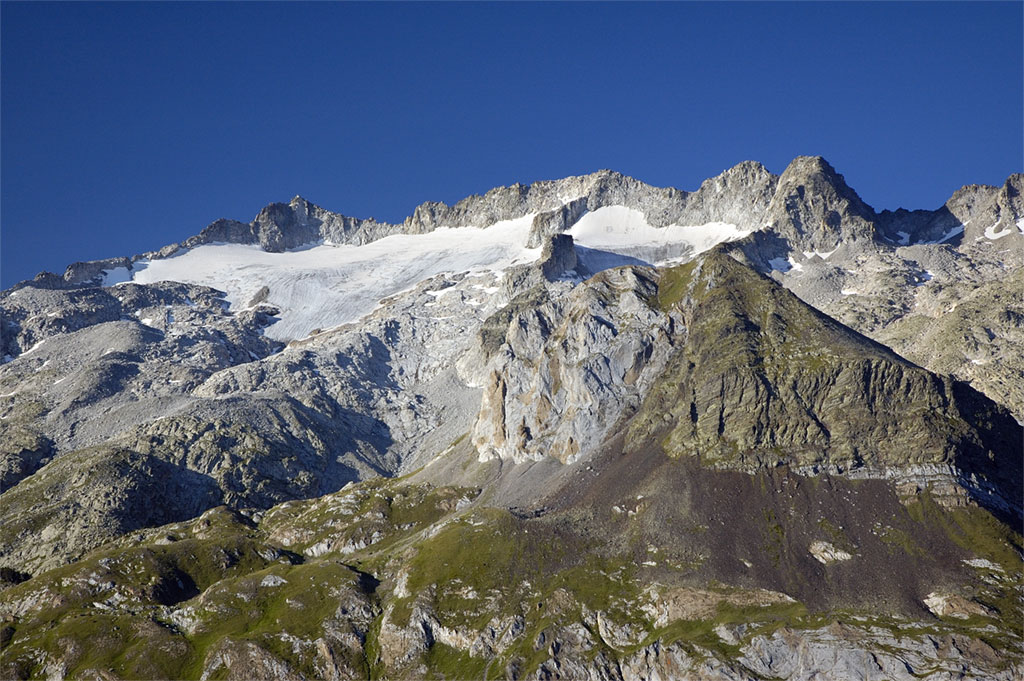
Maladeta, a granodiorite massif in the axial zone, with glacier and Paleozoic cover sediments (front right)

The axial zone, also called primary axial zone, is a huge basement dome of Precambrian and Paleozoic (primary) rocks folded and metamorphosed during the Variscan orogeny and intruded by late-stage Variscan granitoids. All the highest peaks of the Pyrenees are in the axial zone, hence the name.

Amongst the Variscan granitoids are biotite granites (Canigó, Quérigut Massif), two-mica granites (Caillaouas Massif) and granodiorites (Bassiès, Maladeta). The granitoids are mainly shallow epizonal intrusives, but mesozonal and catazonal rocks are also represented.

The high elevations of the axial zone (generally above 3000 m) are compensated isostatically by an increased thickness of the continental crust. For instance below the Maladeta massif, a root zone formed so that the Mohorovicic discontinuity is encountered there at a depth of 50 km. Likewise over most peaks of the axial zone, a negative gravity anomaly can be detected which slowly disappears to the east.

The basement is traversed by major east–west-striking, late Variscan fracture zones that were reactivated during the alpine orogeny cycle. In the eastern part of the axial zone, the fractures are generally upright, a good example being the mylonitic Merens Fault at Pic del Port Vell near Mérens-les-Vals. In the western part, the fractures are more gently dipping to the north and behave as en echelon thrusts arranged in a northwest-southeasterly fashion; along these fractures, the basement of the axial zone overthrusts Mesozoic sedimentary units to the south. Good examples are the en echelon thrusts at Eaux Chaudes, Gavarnie and Bénasque—Las Nogueras (referring to the upper reaches of the rivers Noguera Ribagorzana and Noguera Pallaresa). Concomitant with the thrusts, a schistosity developed that affected the basement as well as the sedimentary cover implying an alpine origin. All these fractures account for an overall compression of the axial zone by 20% which translates as roughly 10 to 20 km of crustal shortening. As a result, the axial zone was squeezed into a south-directed antiformal stack.

The axial zone disappears in the Haut Béarn as a pericline underneath the Upper Cretaceous sedimentary cover only to reappear in the basement uplifts of Aldudés-Quinto Réal, the southernmost of the Basque basement massifs. In the east the axial zone becomes downfaulted into Neogene and Quaternary grabens of Northern Catalonia and finally disappears underneath the Mediterranean.

The central and eastern section of the axial zone is bounded in the north by the North Pyrenean Fault, a system of N 110-striking, steeply dipping reverse-faults. The trace of the North Pyrenean Fault becomes more and more diffuse west of Lourdes; near the Basque basement massifs, it seems to be displaced to the south by a wrench fault and then possibly continues into Spain south of the Basque Marble Nappe and south of the Basque Fold Belt. In Cantabria, it finally reaches the Atlantic coast. The southern limit of the axial zone runs completely on Spanish territory. It is represented by an alpine reverse-fault along which the sediments of the South Pyrenean Zone are overthrust by the axial zone. In the east, the axial zone abuts directly against nappes of eastern representatives of the Sierras Marginales.

=== South Pyrenean zone ===
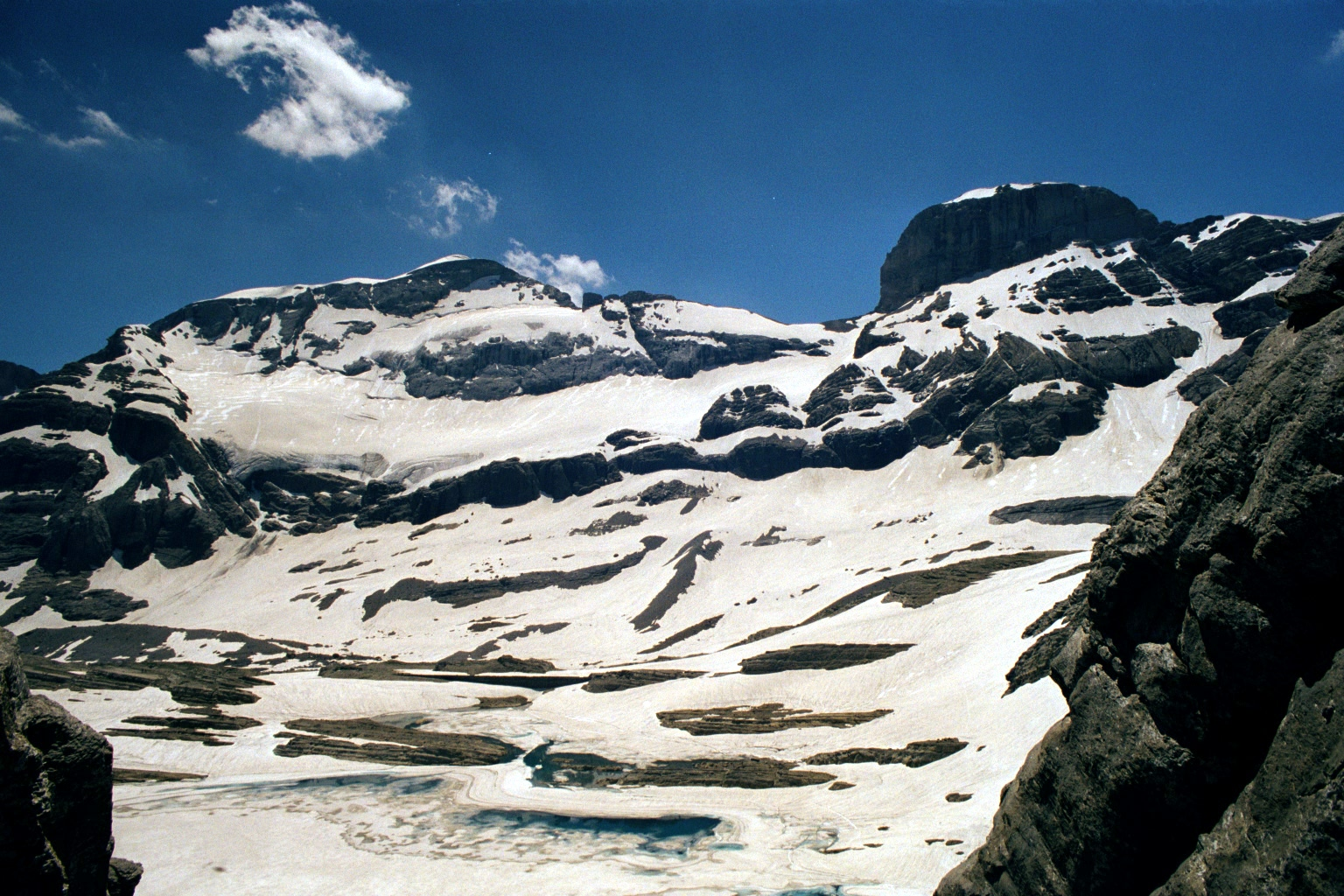
Monte Perdido, an internal sedimentary thrust unit of the northwestern South Pyrenean Zone.

The South Pyrenean Zone consists of a Mesozoic-Eocene sedimentary sequence which has detached from the axial zone within evaporitic horizons of the Middle or Upper Triassic and consequently was transported southward. The basement of this sequence does not outcrop. The southward motion was "channelised" by two major conjugated faults, in the west by the more or less north–south-trending folds and thrusts near the Cinca river (Mediano and Boltaña anticlines), and in the east by the northeast–southwest-trending en echelon wrench faults at the Segre river. At the latter, the thrust system forms a break-back (hindward-thrusting) imbricate emergent fan which developed during the latest Eocene and early Oligocene. Due to constriction, the sedimentary cover was forced into several internal overthrusts, examples being the nappe of the Monte Perdido and the nappe of the Cotiella in the northwest. More centrally placed is the Bóixols Thrust Sheet which continues farther east in the Pedraforca Thrust Sheet (upper unit). The Bóixols Thrust Sheet is hindward-thrusting but also overrides the Montsec Thrust Sheet to the south. Its sediments reach 5000 m in thickness and are mostly Lower Cretaceous in age. The Montsec Thrust Sheet correlates with the lower unit of the Pedraforca Thrust Sheet. It consists of a 2000 m thick layer of Upper Cretaceous limestone followed by Lower and Middle Eocene syntectonic conglomerate, sandstone and shale.

The internal thrusts naturally led to a substantial increase in thickness. The South Pyrenean Zone finally terminates along the South Pyrenean Thrust where the Montsec Thrust Sheet overrides the Sierras Marginales.

The thrusting motions that formed an imbricate thrust system with associated piggyback basins took place mainly during the Eocene. The distances travelled by the thrust sheets is still debated, estimates varying from relatively small to as much as 30 to 50 km.

=== Sierras Marginales ===
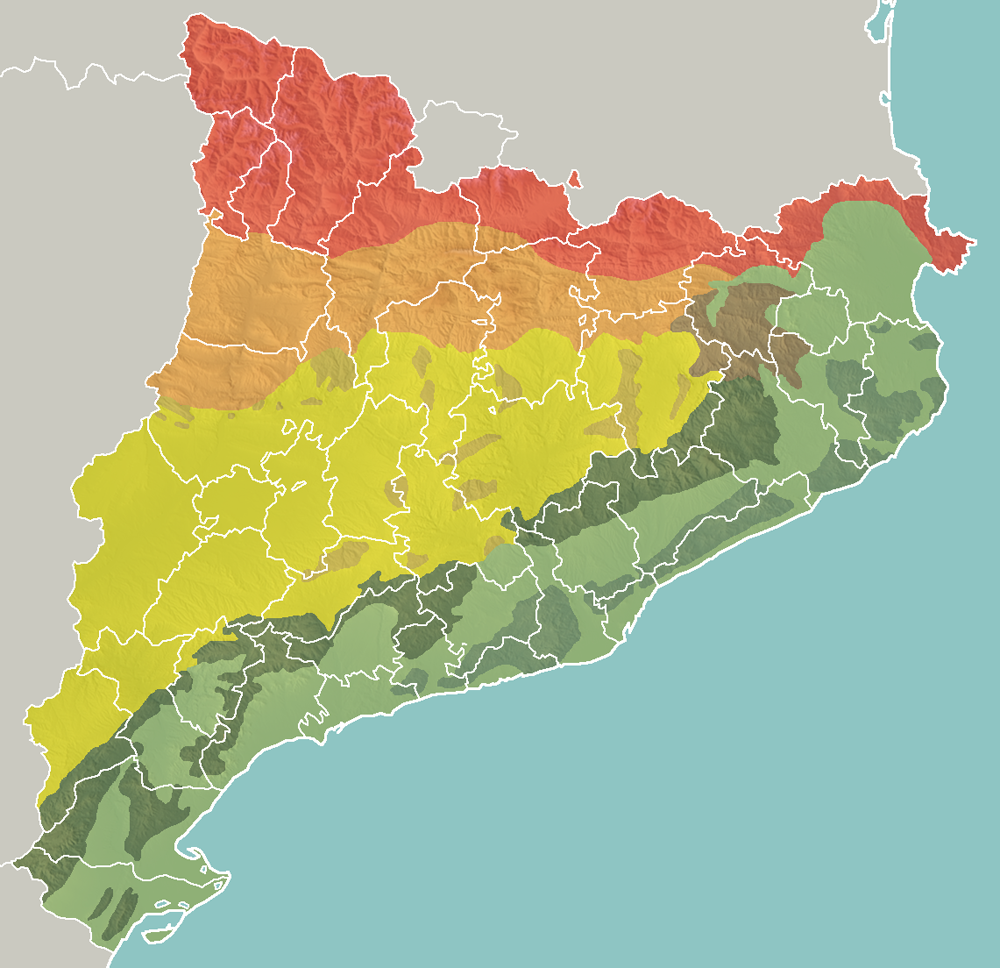
Geomorphologic map of Catalonia: Pyrenees; Pre-Pyrenees; Catalan Central Depression; Smaller mountain ranges of the Central Depression; Catalan Transversal Range; Catalan Pre-Coastal Range; Catalan Coastal Range; Catalan Coastal Depression and other coastal and pre-coastal plains

The Sierras Marginales (Spanish: Border Ranges), or "Serralades marginals" in Catalan, are the Sierras Aragonesas and Serralades Catalanes located at the South of the southern Pre-Pyrenees. They are, much like the South Pyrenean Zone, formed from a Mesozoic-Eocene sedimentary succession, albeit with a much reduced thickness of about 900 m. The succession comprises Keuper, Jurassic, unconformable lower Cretaceous bauxites, unconformable Upper Cretaceous, Paleocene in Garumnian facies, and lower Eocene. Units of the Sierras Marginales underthrust successions of the Ebro Basin. Later on these underthrusts were unconformably covered by Oligocene and Miocene sequences from the Ebro Basin. To the west, the Sierras Marginales are relayed by the Jaca-Pamplona Thrust Sheet which consists of a younger Eocene–Oligocene sedimentary succession. In this thrust sheet west of the Gállego River, the structures simplify: in the Basque and in the Cantabrian Mountains, the sedimentary cover is affected only by long and relatively open fold trains, which are occasionally pierced by doming Keuper salt. In the east, the Sierras Marginales are represented by the tectonically comparable Port del Comte Thrust Sheet and by the Cadí Thrust Sheet, which are made up essentially of an Eocene succession.

The Sierras Marginales are overthrust in the north by the Montsec Range Thrust Sheet of the South Pyrenean Zone.

The end of the southward directed thrusting motions was diachronous and migrated from east to west. For instance in the Cadí Thrust Sheet, motions stopped 34 million years ago (Eocene/Oligocene boundary), whereas in the Jaca-Pamplona Thrust Sheet they stopped as late as 23 million years ago (Oligocene/Miocene boundary).

=== Southern foreland ===
The Southern foreland of the pyrenean orogen is the Ebro Basin or Ebro Foreland Basin. It can be divided into a Southern Folded Foreland section in the northeastern Catalan sector and a basically undeformed flat-lying main section taking up the rest. Like the Subpyrenean Zone in the north, the Southern Folded Foreland was also affected by the thrusting motions of the Sierras Marginales and their easterly representatives. The induced folding intensity decreases the farther one moves away from the thrust fronts until one reaches the undeformed Ebro Basin. The fold trends follow more or less the pyrenean direction or parallel to the thrust fronts, but turn NE-SW near the Segre River (e.g. the Oliana Anticline).

The sedimentary succession in the Ebro Basin shows Paleozoic rocks at the base followed by uppermost Cretaceous/lowermost Paleocene red beds and Eocene limestones, marine marls, and Upper Eocene evaporites (Cardona evaporites). The lower Oligocene is conglomeratic and pro-grades southward into evaporite and lacustrine deposits. In the Southern Folded Foreland, the folded Paleogene series are unconformably overlain by flat-lying non-marine Miocene and Pliocene strata of the main Ebro Basin.

The Ebro Basin deepens towards the South Pyrenean Frontal Fault where it comprises 3000 m of sedimentary infill. This reduces to 1500 m near the thrust front of the Sierra Marginales. The deepest part of the basin with 5000 m of sediments is near Logroño at its most northwestern end.

== Evolution of the orogen ==
Due to its polycyclic geological evolution, the Pyrenees can be attributed to two major orogenic cycles:

- a prealpine cycle.
- an alpine cycle.

=== Prealpine orogenic cycle ===
==== Precambrian ====
Structural and petrological studies in metamorphic rocks of the axial zone and of the North Pyrenean Zone were able to prove the existence of incorporated Precambrian remnants. For example, in the basement of the Canigó massif and in the basement uplift of the Agly, the remnants of a Precambrian basement were discovered (recognised by radiometric dating on granitoids and by certain structures of tectonic origin), which were later incorporated into the Variscan orogen by tectonic movements and the associated metamorphism.

The original radiometric results were, however, not confirmed by the SHRIMP-method (only Ordovician ages between 477 and 471 million years were found). The Cadomian origin of the basement is therefore uncertain.

The Precambrian rocks are mainly gneisses and meta-sediments of amphibolite and granulite facies intruded by charnockites.

==== Neoproterozoic and Paleozoic ====
The Cambro-Ordovician metamorphic rocks comprise migmatites of upper amphibolite facies grade, mica schists with andalusite, cordierite and staurolite of lower amphibolite facies grade, and phyllites of greenschist facies grade.

The epicontinental, psammitic sediments of the Neoproterozoic and the Lower Paleozoic are a very thick detrital (mudstone-sandstone) succession essentially devoid of fossils. These sediments were in a large part later overprinted by the Variscan orogeny. Intercalated near the base of the detrital succession are carbonates.

The (meta)sedimentary succession starts with the 2000 to 3000 m thick Canaveilles Group in the Ediacarian about 580 million years ago. Its sediments consist mainly of shales and greywackes with intercalated rhyolites and carbonates. Within the Cadí Thrust Sheet archeocyathid–bearing limestones developed during the Lower Cambrian. At the onset of the Middle Cambrian, the Canaveilles Group is replaced by the Jujols Group, a 2000 m thick flyschoid series comprising schists, shales, and siltstones interlayered with carbonates and quartzites. The Jujols Group is less metamorphic than the mesozonal Canaveilles Group. Its sedimentation lasted probably into the lowermost Ordovician.

During Ediacaran to Ordovician times, Pyrenees were located at the Northwest margin of Gondwana, where they formed a lateral continuity of neighbouring areas, such as the Montagne Noire and the Mouthoumet massifs and Southwestern territory of Sardinia.

After a longer hiatus, up to 100 m of Caradocian (Ordovician stage 5 and 6) conglomerate follow unconformably upon the Jujols Group—the Rabassa Conglomerate. This is overlain by nearly 500 m of the Cava Formation, interlayered greywackes, and shales containing volcanic horizons. The 200 m thick Estana Formation is made up of limestones and calcareous shales. Its end–Ordovician limestones contain a benthic fauna (brachiopods, bryozoans, cystoids) as well as conodonts. The succession ends with the badly layered Ansobell Formation (20 to 300 m), dark schists that bear microconglomerates indicating a glaciomarine depositional environment. The Ansobell Formation can develop an unconformity and sometimes follows directly upon the Cava Formation.

The included volcanic rocks and the conglomerates hint at unsettled tectonic conditions, which are probably connected with an early stage of the Caledonian orogeny (Taconian Phase).

During the Rhuddanian (Silurian) initially 20 m of quartzitic rocks, the Bar Quartzite, were deposited followed by 50 to 250 m of dark, graphitic, graptolite-bearing shales. The thickness of the shales can increase in the West to 850 m. They take up nearly the entire Silurian (Aeronian until Pridoli), documented by the graptolites. In their upper section (Ludlow), the shales incorporate calcareous horizons and calcareous nodules (with conodonts, nautiloids, bivalves, crinoids, and ostracods). Close to the Basque massifs, the calcareous facies changes into a detritic facies of interlayered sand– and silt–stones. The graptolite-bearing shales were later metamorphosed into lower amphibolite facies slates. They form prominent décollement surfaces.

The Devonian is marine and rich in fossils (spiriferids and trilobites like phacops). It consists of six depositional areas (and a wealth of formations) differing considerably in their sedimentary evolution (especially in the Basque Pyrenees). Generally in the western Pyrenees, shallow marine facies prevail, whereas in the eastern Pyrenees, hemipelagic facies with occasional high grounds predominate. The Devonian has highly variable thicknesses, its 100–600 m—and in places 1400 —thick succession is made up of many different sedimentary facies like greywackes, reefal limestones, and sandstones. Quite distinctive are banded pink to red, blue or green limestones and nodular limestones, the so-called griottes of the lower Famennian. Calcareous shales and black shales also occur.

The Lochkovian consists of black shales and limestones and is very rich in conodonts. During the Pragian, a siliciclastic wedge formed, the San Silvestre Quartzite of the Basibé Formation. The period Upper Givetian till Frasnian witnessed pronounced lithological differences and increased sedimentation rates. In the Lower Frasnian, reef complexes developed, yet at the same time siliciclastic material was being delivered into the western, central, and Basque domain. At the beginning of the Middle Famennian, the sedimentation in the Pyrenees became more uniform again and until the end of the Devonian, monotonous, condensed cephalopod-bearing limestones were laid down (Griotte limestones and grey to pinkish, nodular Supragriotte limestones). Towards the end of the Famennian, first hiati started to appear leading to complete emersion of the western Pyrenees at the onset of the Mississippian. The corresponding unconformity, which exists only in the western Pyrenees, belongs to an early deformation phase of the Variscan orogeny (Breton Phase).

Only in the western Pyrenees is the Lower Carboniferous (Mississippian) distinguished from the Devonian sediments by an unconformity, starting off marine with a transgressive quartz–pebble bed. Anywhere else, the Supragriotte limestones are conformably overlain by pre-orogenic sediments that begin with the Lower Cherts of the Tournaisian. The Lower Cherts comprise 50 m of black, phosphate nodule-bearing cherts interlayered with black shales. After an interlude of grey, nodular, goniatite-bearing limestones, the Upper Cherts were deposited during the Viséan—grey or green cherts sometimes interlayered with pyroclastics and ending with grey nodular limestones.

The Mississippian later on changes into the nearly 1000 m thick detrital, syn-orogenic sediments of the Kulm–facies. An exception are the western Pyrenees, where, during the Serpukhovian, dark grey, laminated limestones precede the Kulm. The diachronous Kulm sediments are a flysch-like (turbidites) interlayering of sandstones and dark shales—harbingers of the Variscan tectonic movements. They also contain layers of hemipelagic limestones, conglomerates, carbonaceous breccias as well as olistoliths. Sedimentation of the Kulm facies started in the East already at the Viséan/Serpukhovian boundary (Namurian), but west of the Gallégo river, it started only at the beginning of the Pennsylvanian (Upper Westphalian, Bashkirian). In the Basque Pyrenees, the Kulm sedimentation perdured into the Moskovian. The Kulm sediments were deposited as canyon deposits on the continental slope or as submarine fans in a southwest migrating foredeep of the Variscan orogen.

==== Variscan orogeny ====
The Variscan orogeny is expressed as an important unconformity within the Paleozoic sedimentary succession, usually placed above the Lower Westphalian (Bashkirian) and below the Stephanian (Moscovian), but sometimes already below the Upper Westphalian. The tectonic movements therefore happened about 310 million years ago, dated by fossil plants.

The Upper Westphalian shows an important unconformity at its base and is made up of conglomerates. The Moscovian is represented by blue-black shales, overlain by the so-called Grey Unit of the Kasimovian (Stephanian B) and the Transitional Layers of the Gzhelian (Stephanian C and Autunian). These sediments are non-metamorphic or only weakly metamorphosed, whereas the sediments below the unconformity fully experienced the Variscan metamorphism.

The far-reaching effects of the Variscan orogeny influenced the pyrenean domain in many ways. Of prime importance were the compressional stresses that folded the Paleozoic sediments. Several fold generations developed, sometimes superimposing each other. Associated with the folds are schistosities. The Paleozoic sediments and its Precambrian basement were also metamorphosed under high-temperature and low-pressure conditions (HP/LT). In places anatexis was reached, an example being the melting of some Precambrian gneisses of the Prevariscan basement together with their enveloping mica schists. Another important consequence of the orogeny was late-orogenic magmatism emplacing granitoids (granodiorites and biotite granites) of mainly acid but occasionally also of basic composition. Amongst these granitoids are deep-seated, rather diffuse, intrusive bodies associated with migmatites, yet also typical, well-defined plutons often rising into the cores of anticlines within the Variscan fold-belt. The main magmatism perdured from 310 to 270 million years (late Pennsylvanian and early Permian cooling ages). A good example for the main magmatism is the 280 million years old Maladeta granodiorite.

Also of importance was late-stage fracturing under brittle conditions. The developing fractures probably followed weak zones already initiated during the Paleozoic. The main direction of these fractures is WNW-ESE, the so-called Pyrenean direction, an excellent example being the North Pyrenean Fault. These fractures will play a decisive role during the further development of the orogen.

=== Alpine orogenic cycle ===
Also compare with: Aquitaine Basin — Sedimentary evolution

==== Pennsylvanian, Permian and Lower Triassic ====
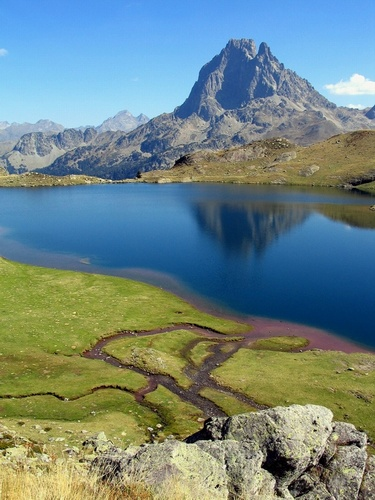
Pic du Midi d'Ossau, remnant of a Permian volcanic edifice

The sediments deposited after the Asturian Phase in the Upper Westphalian (Moscovian) right through to the Upper Triassic can be regarded as molasse of the Variscan orogen which underwent late-stage extension. In half-grabens 2500 of sediment accumulated at the close of the Carboniferous and throughout the Permian, mainly interbedded non-marine and basaltic-andesitic rocks. Detrital formations of lacustrine affinity with coal measures during the Stephanian (Kasimovian and Gzhelian) followed by red sandstones with plant remains during the Permian are typical erosional products of a chain not having reached stability.

The Grey Unit of the Kasimovian is a sequence of decreasing grain-size, starting with breccias and conglomerates and changing into sandstones and coal-bearing shales (anthracite is mined near Campo de la Troya). Also included are andesitic layers that can attain significant thicknesses in places. The Transitional Layers are also a sequence of decreasing grain-size (conglomerates, sandstones, and coal-bearing shales), but, instead of andesites, they include tuffs and rhyodacitic lavas. They close with lacustrine limestones containing stromatolites, charophytes, and ostracods.

The continental red beds of the Permian rest unconformably on the Transitional Layers. They show strong variations in their thicknesses and reach 800 m, sometimes even 1000 m. They occur mainly in the Basque Pyrenees and in the axial zone. Like the Stephanian sediments, they were deposited as alluvial (as fans and in ephemeral streams) and lacustrine sediments within transtensive basins of the Variscan orogen.

The aforementioned fractures were decisive in determining facies distributions during this interval. They also influenced the distribution of volcanic eruptions during the Permian such as the calcalkaline volcanism at Pic du Midi d'Ossau and the basalts of the Basque country. The trigger for these volcanic eruptions probably was early wrenching motions of Iberia relative to the Eurasian plate.

In the axial zone, the Permian can be subdivided into three sedimentary series (from top to bottom):

- La Peña de Marcanton series. It reaches a thickness of 500 m and is mainly fine-grained.
- Pic Baralet series. Up to 300 m thick. It is composed of polygenic conglomerates with Paleozoic limestone fragments embedded in red sandstone. The series rests partially unconformable on the Somport series.
- Somport series. A generally fine-grained series that can attain 300 m in thickness and is composed of red to purple claystones. It rests unconformably on the Transitional Layers.

The detrital Lower Triassic (Buntsandstein) is very similar to the Permian. It reaches 400 to 500 m in thickness and is made up of coarse conglomerates, sandstones, psammites with plant remains (Equisetites, Coniferomyelon) as well as green and red to purple claystones. At this time, the peneplanation of the Variscan orogen had reached an advanced stage and the sedimentary accommodation spaces started to widen.

==== Middle Triassic till Upper Jurassic ====
The sedimentary successions from the Middle Triassic to the Upper Jurassic are very similar on both sides of the Pyrenees.

During the Middle Triassic the sea advanced again, but reached only the North Pyrenean Zone and the Basque country. The resulting sediments left behind are 20 to 100 m of dolomitic cellular limestones, grey fossiliferous limestones, and wavy limestones. In the Upper Triassic (Keuper), the sedimentation spread over the entire Pyrenean domain. About 220 m million years ago (during the Carnian) evaporites settled out in lagoons and grabens—variegated, gypsum–bearing, iron-rich clays, gypsum, anhydrite, dolomitic marls, dolomites, rock salt as well as potassium and magnesium salts occur. The evaporites served later as major decollement horizons. At the limit, Upper Triassic/Hettangian doleritic tholeiites (ophites) formed in the Pyrenees and in the southern Aquitaine Basin, indicating further movements along the fracture zones (submarine fissure eruptions and sills in unsolidified Keuper sediments).

The sedimentation during the Jurassic is characterised by the growth of a carbonate platform. The sediments are mainly epicontinental deposits of lacustrine character, as well as limestones, marls and dolomites with marine or littoral faunas. The basin was under tension during this period and as a result long horsts and graben structures of different subsidence rates were created following more or less the trend of the Variscan fractures. Its northern side is rimmed by the relatively stable Aquitanian shelf. The basin probably is caused by crustal thinning infiltrating from the Atlantic domain.

The Lias started with a transgression that is more important than the advances of the Muschelkalk and Keuper seas. Its total thickness varies between 150 and 400 m. The sea level kept rising during the Hettangian and fossiliferous limestones were deposited; this trend reversed later on into a regression leaving evaporites (rock salt and anhydrite with some calcareous interlayers). At the edge of the basin and in the eastern Pyrenees, argillaceous limestones and banded dolomites with layers of anhydrite settled out; the dolomites transformed upon dissolution of the anhydrite into monogenic breccias. The regression continued during the Lower Sinemurian, sedimenting intra– and supra–tidal banded limestones and dolomites. In the Upper Sinemurian (Lotharingian), more open-marine conditions established themselves due to a renewed sea-level rise; in deeper parts of the basin, fossiliferous limestones developed, whereas, on high ground, oolithic limestones accumulated. The Middle Lias (Pliensbachian) started off transgressive as well with fine-grained detrital, limey to marly sediments (ferruginous oolites, fossiliferous limestones and marls) that change over to marls. In the eastern Pyrenees, pyrite-bearing claystones formed due to a badly oxygenated environment; they contain a very diverse fauna of ammonites belonging to the French southeastern domain, whereas the ammonite population on the Atlantic side is rather monotonous. During the Upper Lias (Toarcian), the sea reached a high stand, continuing with the fine-grained detrital sedimentation and depositing black pelagic marls (marnes noires and schistes esquilleux). Towards the end of the Lias, regressive tendencies again became noticeable.

Falling sea levels continued right into the Middle Jurassic. Near Pau an oolite barrier started to grow that extends all the way north to Poitiers. It divided the sedimentary basin now into two major facies domains: a deeper western domain open to the Atlantic and undergoing infratidal sedimentation (black to blueish argillaceous limestones rich in benthic organisms, microfilaments, and ammonites) and a shallow, enclosed, eastern domain with intertidal sedimentation (variable carbonate facies like pseudo-oolites and banded dolomites, but also anhydrite-bearing evaporites). These intertidal sediments experienced a strong contemporaneous dolomitization. Towards the end of the Middle Jurassic, sea levels fell even further.

==== Upper Jurassic and Lower Cretaceous ====
During the Upper Jurassic (Tithonian) and especially during the Lower Cretaceous, drastic changes occurred. Iberia started to rift off the Armorican Massif in a southerly direction and in its wake the Bay of Biscay slowly began to spread (with formation of oceanic crust from the Middle Albian till the end of the Coniacian).

The sedimentation in the Malm (total thickness 600 to 750 m) did not increase until the Upper Oxfordian, the Lower Oxfordian rarely being present. The 100 to 150 m thick Upper Oxfordian is represented west of the oolite barrier by intratidal platform sediments (argillaceous to sandy, pyrite-bearing limestones), whereas, in the east, dolomitization continues. By Kimmeridgian times, the facies differences attenuated due to shallowing of the western domain, resulting in massive, fine-grained, black, lithographic limestones and fine-grained platy limestones. During the Tithonian, strong regressive tendencies set in that led to a complete withdrawal of the sea. In the Basque country, the sea had withdrawn already at the end of the Kimmeridgian. During times of falling sea levels, evaporitic, dolomitic, lagoonal, and lacustrine facies were left behind.

After a southeasterly re-advance of the sea in the Berriasian via a small strait east of Pau, which deposited 100 m of inter– to sub–tidal limestones and a sandy to clayey detrital border facies, emersion set in during the Neocomian. During Valanginian and Hauterivian times, clayey marls on top of the emerged horsts were transformed under ferralitic climatic conditions into bauxites, which were fossilised by later transgressions. After another marine transgression from the east during the Barremian, the elongated graben regions in the Pyrenean domain received 200 to 300 m of marine shelf sediments of the Urgonian facies, such as dolomites, algal limestones, foraminiferous limestones, and rudist limestones. The Urgonian facies can perdure in the Corbières and in the South Pyrenean Zone into the Albian. With falling sea levels in the Upper Barremian, black, pyrite-bearing claystones and lagoonal limestones rich in ostracods and characeans were sedimented.

After the Barremian/Aptian boundary, marked by another high stand of the sea, there were four more sea-level oscillations during the Aptian and the Albian, bringing about a very significant sediment accumulation (in some places up to 3000 m). Due to sinking grabens in the Atlantic domain, the water masses of the Atlantic and the Tethys mixed for the first time. The Aptian/Albian sediments are characterised by the competitive interplay between fine-grained terrigenic and organic material. The organic material is responsible for the formation of shallow platforms built by rudists, hexacorals, and algae. In the Upper Albian, the terrigenic material predominated, and several shallow marine, partially calcareous sandstone formations were deposited. The source region of the detrital material was the Aragon/Pyrenees domain that was undergoing a first epirogenetic uplift. In the same context, the fluvial delta sediments of the Formation de Mixe were transported from the south, and the very heterogeneous, up to 1000 m thick conglomerates of the Poudingues de Mendibelza, interpreted as the topset of a delta-front.

==== Upper Cretaceous ====
Just before the onset of the Upper Cretaceous, the pyrenean domain had separated in the Albian into two very different sedimentary facies realms. On the northern edge of Iberia (in the South Pyrenean Zone and in the axial zone), shelf carbonates were then being deposited. Because of several emersions, they only show very reduced thicknesses. Due to transtension in the North Pyrenean Zone, a very strongly subsiding flysch basin (North Pyrenean Basin) developed, which follows essentially the east–west-trending Variscan fracture zones. The basin was deepening towards the Atlantic and shallowing towards the east, where it terminates before the Aude river. It is split by the basement massifs of the North Pyrenean Zone into two strands—a southerly strand called sillon aturien, which received up to 2500 m of flysch ardoisier and a northerly strand with the flysch noir. The flysch basin is rimmed to the north by the relatively stable Aquitanian Shelf. It was formed probably by extensive crustal thinning that penetrated from the Atlantic side.

Concurrent with the transtension, the Pyrenean Metamorphism took place characterised by high heat flow (peak temperatures were 500–600 °C) but relatively low pressures (HT/LP-metamorphism). Under these conditions, new minerals like biotite, diopside and scapolite grew. The metamorphism is diachronous and has been dated radiometrically in the eastern North Pyrenean Zone as Albian, whereas in the Basque country in the west (for example in the Basque Marble Nappe) it has been dated only as Campanian. It is possible that the metamorphism lasted in a milder form until the end of the Cretaceous or even the beginning of the Eocene.

Two major deformational phases with the development of schistosities (Upper Albian till Lower Cenomanian and Santonian till Maastrichtian) affected the pyrenean domain during the Upper Cretaceous expressing themselves as unconformities in the sedimentary record. The flysch basin was shortened and at the northern edge of Iberia, an orogenic wedge formed that moved slowly into the northern foreland. As a consequence, the flysch basin receiving the erosional products from the wedge was forced to migrate to the north too (changeover during the Santonian of the centre of subsidence from the North Pyrenean Basin to the Subpyrenean Basin). The Subpyrenean Basin was consequently filled in by 1000 to 4000 m of flysch à fucoides.

The Variscan fracture zones were active during the entire Upper Cretaceous and decisively influenced the sedimentary facies distributions. This activity was further underlined by alkaline magmatism lasting from the Middle Albian until the end of the Coniacian; thus in the west of the North Pyrenean Zone, submarine basaltic lavas extruded, while farther east in the Béarn and in the Bigorre, different magmatic rock types intruded the Upper Cretaceous strata.

==== Cenozoic ====
The sedimentary sequences of the Paleocene highlight the differences between the eastern and the western Pyrenees. In the west, the marine shelf facies continued and the flysch basin carried on subsiding. In the east, the continental red beds of the Garumnian facies (whose deposition started already at the close of the Cretaceous) were laid down, mainly alluvial and paludial facies. At the same time, the first tectonic shortenings and uplifts affected the eastern Pyrenees.

In the western Pyrenees, the marine sedimentation also carried on during the Eocene. In two subsiding basins on both sides of today's chain, limestones, marls, foraminiferous sandstones, and sandstones with a benthic fauna were sedimented. The Eocene sedimentary successions along the French northern edge of the Pyrenees (in the North Pyrenean Zone) are fairly thin and full of facies changes. There, short-lived transgressions and regressions can be followed into the Languedoc. During the Ypresian, the first conglomerates start being delivered.

This very thick conglomeratic formation, called the Poudingues de Palassou, is the indicator for the most important orogenic phase in the Pyrenean domain, the Pyrenean main phase, which was accompanied by very strong deformations and uplifts. The conglomerates are later unconformably overlain by end–Eocene strata, therefore the orogenic phase can be assigned to the interval Ypresian/Lutetian, i.e. roughly 50 to 40 million years ago.

On the southern side of the Pyrenees in Catalonia, folded conglomeratic formations have been dated as Upper Lutetian to Bartonian, representing the interval 44 to 37 million years ago. They also are unconformably overlain by end–Eocene sediments bearing a continental fauna.

The Pyrenean main phase manifested itself on both sides of the axial zone as reverse faults and thrusts with fairly large displacements. The movements were directed on the French side to the north, and on the Spanish side to the south. But their spatial arrangement was not symmetrical; the Spanish side for instance has much lower dipping structures. The faulting and thrusting disrupted not only the Mesozoic and Paleogene sedimentary cover, but also large parts of the Variscan basement. The basement had failed not just rigidly at the Paleozoic fracture systems, but also underwent intensive alpine deformations around heterogeneities and anisotropies in its structural fabric.

Deformational phases of lesser importance followed the Pyrenean main phase, all contributing to the final appearance of the orogen. At the northern margin of the Ebro Basin close to the Sierras Marginales, for example, folded Oligocene is covered unconformably by flat-lying, detrital Miocene of continental origin. This points to another deformational phase at the end of the Oligocene about 25 million years ago.

After the beginning of the Miocene, the uplifted orogen underwent severe erosion, expressed by enormous molasses being shed into the foreland basins such as for example the Aquitaine Basin. In the Pliocene, a renewed uplift started, leading to the formation of huge alluvial fans at the mountain front, a notable example being the Lannemezan alluvial fan. Another important consequence of the uplifting was peneplanation. Several peneplanation levels have been found on very different heights (3000 to 2000 m in the axial zone, close to a 1000 m in the Pays de Sault, near 400 m in the Agly massif and at 100 m in the Corbières). They generally become lower in the east, with several uplifts towards the end of the Oligocene, towards the end of the Miocene (Pontian peneplanation), and towards the end of the Pliocene (Villafranchian peneplanation).

Neogene sediments have been preserved in the Pyrenees mainly in small grabens close to the Mediterranean (near La Cerdanya). The grabens have also repeatedly been flooded by the Mediterranean, examples being the graben near Ampurdan and grabens in the Roussillon containing a Pliocene fauna. These extensional structures most likely owe their existence to renewed movements on Variscan fractures. The very young volcanic area near Olot probably has a similar cause.

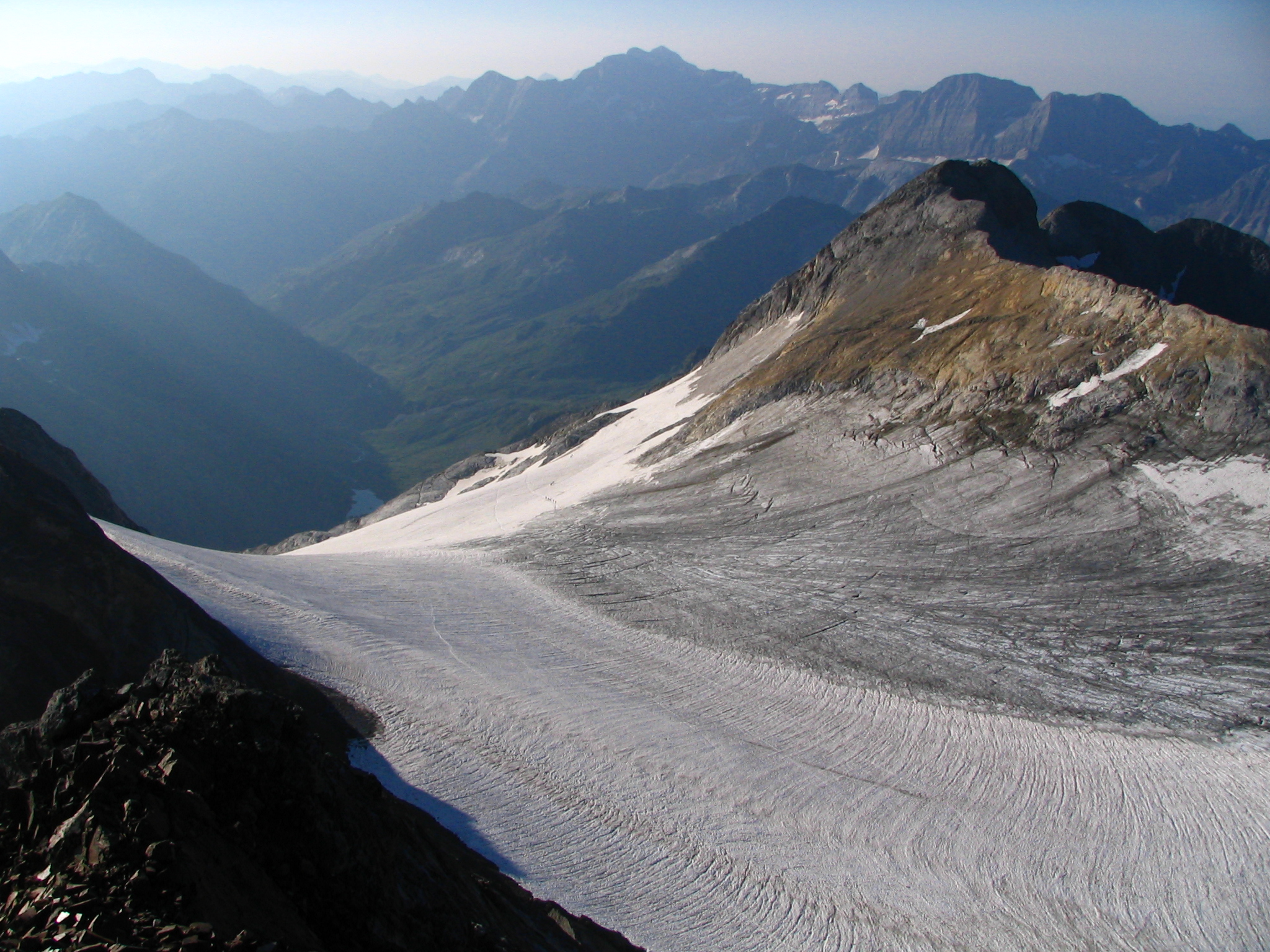
Ossoue glacier and Pic Montferrat in the Vignemale massif

During the Quaternary, the Pyrenees experienced several glaciations, but of far less intensity than for example in the Alps. Large glaciers advanced through the valleys of the Gave d'Ossau, Gave de Pau, Garonne, and Ariège on the French northern side. Today about 20 smaller true glaciers as well as cirques and glacier remnants subsist (examples are the Aneto glacier, the Ossoue glacier in the Vignemale massif and glaciers on Maladeta and Monte Perdido). All these glaciers have undergone a large retreat since 1850 due to global warming. The total glaciated surface area amounted to 45 km^{2} in 1870, whereas in 2005 a mere 5 km^{2} were left.

== Geodynamic evolution ==
The Pyrenees have experienced a very long geological evolution with multiple orogenies. Neoproterozoic crustal remains (Canigó, Agly) hint at possible Cadomian domains. Indications for Caledonian movements are somewhat clearer (conglomerates and volcanic rocks in the Ordovician). During the Variscan orogeny in the Pennsylvanian, the axial zone and the South Pyrenean Zone became an integral part of what was to become the microcontinent Iberia. The Sierras Marginales were part of the Ebro Block, a northeastern section of Iberia. The appartenance of the North Pyrenean Zone is still uncertain, but the Subpyrenean Zone certainly formed part of the microcontinent Aquitania. Iberia and Aquitania were on the south side of the South Variscan Thrust and therefore constituted the foreland of the Variscan orogen. Both microcontinents had originated from Gondwana's northern margin.

At the close of the Variscan orogeny, Iberia was still connected to northwestern France (the Armorican Massif) and most likely was a northwestern prolongation of Aquitania. Its later movements were vital to the alpine cycle of the Pyrenean orogeny. This is accepted by most geologists, yet the details of Iberia's movements are still uncertain.

During the Upper Jurassic, a rift was propagating from the spreading Central Atlantic along the continental margin of northwestern France towards Aquitaine. This happened probably as early as the Tithonian. As a consequence, the rift wedged Iberia southward and separated it from the Armorican Massif. In the wake, the continental crust was thinned and eventually oceanic crust was beginning to form in the Middle Aptian—the opening of the Bay of Biscay was under way. Final oceanisation of the Bay of Biscay was achieved by Santonian/Campanian times (about 84 million years ago as witnessed by the magnetic polarity chron C 34). Paleomagnetic studies additionally show an anticlockwise 35° rotation of Iberia. The drifting motion of Iberia had taken up the entire Lower Cretaceous. Due to the rotational motion, the northeastern edge of Iberia started to interfere with Aquitania, first creating transtensional pull-aparts along the North Pyrenean Zone in the Middle Albian. The crustal thinning associated with the transtensional rifting process led to HT/LP metamorphism in the North Pyrenean Zone, its onset being dated at about 108 million years ago. At the same time, the lherzolites were finally emplaced. The transcurrent motion along the North Pyrenean pull-apart zone was also accompanied by alkaline magmatism that lasted from the Middle Albian to the end of the Coniacian. The slow progression of the metamorphism into the west seems to imply a large sinistral shearing between Iberia and Aquitania, estimated as an offset of about 200 km (the metamorphism reached the Basque Country only about 80 million years ago in the Campanian).

By the beginning of the Turonian about 90 million years ago, the transtensional regime had finished and was replaced by compression. The rifting in the Basquo-Cantabrian, North Pyrenean, and Subpyrenean Basin had stopped and basin inversion set in; tensional faults were then being used as thrusts. This first rather weak compressional phase with very low shortening rates (less than 0.5 mm/year) lasted till the end of the Thanetian. On the Spanish side of the orogen, the first thrust sheets were emplaced (Upper Pedraforca, Bóixols, and Turbón thrust sheets).

In Ilerdian and Cuisian times (Paleocene/Eocene boundary, Thanetian/Ypresian, about 55 million years ago), the Pyrenees underwent very strong compression in the upper crust, bringing about the orogen's actual zonation and structural organisation. The orogen was squeezed into an asymmetric fan-like structure due to the aborted subduction of Iberia underneath Aquitania. This is inferred from the behaviour of the Mohorovicic discontinuity, which at the North Pyrenean Fault abruptly jumps from 30 to 50 km depth. This Pyrenean main phase lasted till about 47 million years ago (beginning of the Lutetian), showing high shortening rates of 4.0 to 4.4 mm/year and emplacing for example the Lower Pedraforca and the Montsec thrust sheets.

After the Pyrenean main phase, other compressional deformational phases followed during the Oligocene and the Pliocene. Since the Neogene, the orogen exhibits post-kinematic collapse (graben structures at its eastern end, volcanism near Olot) associated with the extension of the Golfe de Lion and the opening of the Valencia Trough. The orogen still undergoes strong erosion (since the Eocene), isostatic movements, post-kinematic extension, and even renewed compression (in the western Pyrenees) that can cause medium-sized earthquakes (a magnitude 5,1 earthquake near Arudy in 1980 avec une magnitude de 5,1, près summary]) and a magnitude 5,0 earthquake in 2006 near Lourdes and other historic earthquakes which even destroyed parts of villages, e.g. a magnitude ≥ 6,0 earthquake near Arette in 1967, where 40% of the buildings were damaged and the church steeple collapsed).

== Structural interpretations ==
The aforementioned asymmetric fan-like, flower-like structural organisation of the Pyrenean orogen has so far been interpreted as follows:

- as a near-vertical collisional structure with the thrust-faults rooted in vertical faults.
- as an allochthonous orogen, with Iberia thrust over the Eurasian plate, i.e. Aquitania.
- as an allochthonous orogen, with Aquitania having overridden Iberia. The vertical faults are presumed to flatten at depth.

Current opinions favour Iberia subducting beneath Aquitania; this interpretation seems to be supported by the results of deep seismic (ECORS) and magnetotelluric profiling across the orogen.

Estimates of the overall shortening across the Pyrenean orogen are mostly between 100 and 150 km. Using the ECORS-data Muñoz (1992) arrives at 147 km of shortening with the subduction of the Iberian middle and lower crust taking up around 110 km. Further interpretations of the ECORS-data led to the recognition of a 50 km thick Iberian crust that was subducting beneath the 30 km thick Aquitanian crust. As a consequence, a low-angle intracrustal detachment level formed at 15 km depth, above the subducting middle and lower Iberian crust. Along this detachment, the rocks now making up the axial zone, the South Pyrenean Zone, and the Sierras Marginales were gliding southward and gradually ramping up to the surface. With continuing constriction, the axial zone buckled up into a south-directed antiformal stack. Towards the end of the subduction, a backthrust initiated near the actual trace of the North Pyrenean Fault, which was cutting upward into the Aquitanian crust by utilising its previously thinned, faulted nature. When the subduction process was finally blocked, parts of the northern axial zone and the North Pyrenean Zone with lower crustal fragments and lherzolites sandwiched in between were pushed back northward over the Subpyrenean Zone.

== See also ==
- Pre-Pyrenees
- Sub-Pyrenees
- Geology of the Iberian Peninsula

== Sources ==
- Alvarado M (1980): Introducción a la Geología general de España. Boletin Geológico y Minero. T(XCI-I):1–65. (in Spanish)
- Auboin J, Debelmas J, & Latreille M (1980): Géologie des chaînes alpines issues de la Téthys. Mémoire de BRGM. N° 115. ISBN 2-7159-5019-5. (in French)
- Chantraine J, Autran A, Cavelier C, et al. (1996): Carte géologique de la France au millionième. Éditions BRGM. Service Géologique National. ISBN 2-7159-2128-4. (in French)
- Choukroune P, Mattauer M, & Rios M (1980): Estructura de los Pirineos. Boletin Geológico y Minero. T(XCI-I):213–248. (in Spanish)
- Debourle A & Deloffre R (1976): Pyrénées Occidentales – Béarn, Pays Basque. Guides géologiques régionaux. Masson. ISBN 2-225-44132-4. (in French)
- Hall CA (): France: Spain: Pyrenees. In: Encyclopedia of European and Asian Geology, by EM Moores & RW Fairbridge.
- Jaffrezo M (1997): Pyrénées Orientales – Corbières. Guides géologiques régionaux. Masson. ISBN 2-225-47290-4. (in French)
- Mirouse R (1980): Introducción a la geología del pirineo. Boletin Geológico y Minero. T. XCI-I:91–106. (in Spanish)
- Mirouse R (1995): Pyrénées – Géologie. Contribution in Encyclopædia Universalis. ISBN 2-85229-290-4. (in French)
- Vergés J (1999): Estudi geològic del vessant sud del Pirineu oriental i central. Evolució cinemàtica en 3D. Servei Geològic, Monografia Tècnica, no. 7, 192pp. (in Catalan with summary in English): https://www.dropbox.com/s/8blotx2at0qwaxr/Verges_1993.pdf
