= Catalan counties =

Countship

The Catalan counties (Catalan: Comtats Catalans, IPA: [kumˈtats kətəˈlans]) were those surviving counties of the Hispanic March and the southernmost part of the March of Gothia that were later united to form the Principality of Catalonia.

In 778, Charlemagne led the first military Frankish expedition into Hispania to create a military buffer zone between the Frankish Empire and the Emirate of Córdoba, occasionally known as the "Hispanic March". The territory that he subdued would in later centuries become the kernel of Catalonia (not yet known like that since the first written mention of Catalonia is in 1113). In 781, Charlemagne made his 3-year-old son Louis the Pious (778 – 840) king of Aquitaine, who was sent there with regents and a court in order to secure the southern border of his kingdom against the Arabs and Moors and to expand southwards into Muslim territory.

These counties were originally primitive feudal entities ruled by a small military elite. Counts were appointed directly by and owed allegiance to the Carolingian (Frankish) emperor. The appointment of heirs could not be taken for granted. However, with the rise of the importance of the Bellonids and strong figures among them such as, Sunifred (fl. 844–848) and Wilfred the Hairy (c.870-897), and the weakening of Carolingian royal power, the appointment of heirs eventually become a formality. This trend resulted in the counts becoming independent of the Carolingian crown under Borrell II in 987, and began calling themselves dei gratia comes (counts by the grace of god) and dux catalanensis (Catalan dukes) or even Hispaniae subjogator (subjucator of Hispania) and propugnator et murus christiani populi (wall and defender of the Christian folk).

The many counties (aside from the counties of County of Pallars, County of Urgell and County of Empuries) were to be soon absorbed into the County of Barcelona. The Count of Barcelona Ramon Berenguer IV, married the heiress of the Kingdom of Aragon, Petronilla of Aragon, in 1150, uniting as equals the Kingdom of Aragon and the County of Barcelona. Thus, their son, Alfonso II of Aragon and I of Barcelona, became the king of the Crown of Aragon.

== Creation ==
The Hispanic March counties between the late 8th and 12th centuries that would be united later as the Principality of Catalonia

The Catalan counties and the County of Barcelona (in blue-grey) at the death of Ramon Berenguer III (1131)

The Frankish conquest of the area from Muslim control began in 759, shortly after the capture of Narbonne, with the establishment of the County of Rosselló, the first of what would later become the Catalan counties to be established. In 785, Rostany (or Rostaing) was made Count of Girona, the first one south of the Pyrenees. Besalú and Empúries were originally part of Girona. When Urgell and Cerdanya were conquered by Carolingian forces around 798, they were also made counties of the Hispanic March and Borrell was made count. He took a very active part in the subsequent conquest of Osona in 799 and the successful siege of Barcelona in 801. He was made count of Osona in 799, perhaps as a reward for his services. In 801, in the greatest military triumph of his long career, Louis the Pious, son of Charlamagne, took Barcelona from its Muslim rulers, making it the greatest city of the Hispanic March's littoral. The County of Barcelona was established and Bera was made its count. In 812, Count dilo of Girona (which included Besalú and Empúries) died and the county also passed to Bera.

In 804 and 805, Borrell participated in the expeditions to Tortosa, but not in the subsequent campaigns of 808 and 809. On Borrell's death in 820, Osona was given to Rampon and Urgell and Cerdanya went to Aznar Galíndez. Also in 820, Bera went into political disfavour and lost the countships of Barcelona and Girona, which also went to Rampon.

Around 813, Empúries became a separate county under Ermenguer, and in 817, it was united to the County of Roussillon. From 835 to 844, Sunyer I was count of Empúries and Peralada while Alaric I was count of Roussillon and Vallespir.

Besalú was made a separate county in 878 for Radulf on the condition that it pass to the heirs of Wilfred the Hairy on his death. It went to Miro I the Younger in 912.

Barcelona soon overshadowed the other counties in importance, especially during the reign of Wilfred the Hairy in the late 9th century. At that time, the power of the Carolingian Empire was waning and the neglected Hispanic March counties were practically independent of its royal authority. In the early 11th century, Berenguer Ramon I, Count of Barcelona, was able to submit to Sancho III of Navarre as his suzerain, even though he was still legally a vassal of Robert II of France. With the accession of Robert's father, Hugh Capet, the first non-Carolingian king, in 987, most of the counts refused to pay homage to the new dynasty. Over the next century, most of the counties were absorbed or became vassals of the County of Barcelona. In 1137, the Count of Barcelona Ramon Berenguer IV married the heiress of the Kingdom of Aragon Petronella, daughter of the Aragonese king Ramiro II, thus establishing a personal union of the County of Barcelona and its vassals with the Kingdom of Aragon to create the Crown of Aragon. After 1173, the Catalan counties, including the vassals of Barcelona, fell under the legal definition of Catalonia, a polity which was officially defined as a principality in 1343. Several of the later Aragonese kings re-created some of the counties as appanages for younger sons.

== Catalan Counties and Viscounties ==
Catalan Counties
- County of Barcelona
- County of Berga
- County of Besalú
- County of Cerdanya
- County of Conflent
- County of Empúries
- County of Girona
- County of Manresa
- County of Osona or Ausona
- County of Pallars
- County of Pallars Jussà (Lower Pallars)
- County of Pallars Sobirà (Upper Pallars)
- County of Ribagorça
- County of Rosselló
  (often referred to as Roussillon, its French name)
- County of Urgell
Catalan Viscounties
- Viscounty of Àger
- Viscounty of Besalú or Bas
- Viscounty of Cabrera
- Viscounty of Cardona
- Viscounty of Castellbó
- Viscounty of Cerdanya
- Viscounty of Illa (Ille sur Tet in French)
- Viscounty of Jóc (Joch in French)
- Viscounty of Fenollet or Fenolleda (Fenouillèdes in French)
- Viscounty of Pallars, Siarb or Vilamur
- Viscounty of Peralada
- Viscounty of Rocaberti
- Viscounty of Tatzó (Argelès in French)
- Viscounty of Urtx
- Viscounty of Vallespir or Castellnou

== Appointed rulers ==
| Ruler | Born | Reign | County | Death | Family | Notes |
|---|---|---|---|---|---|---|
| Rostany | ? | 785–801/11 | Girona | ? | ? | |
| Borrell I | ? | 798–820 | Cerdanya; Urgell; Osona | 820 | ? | After his death his counties were annexed by the County of Aragon (820-834/38). |
| Odilon | ? | 801/11–817 | Girona | ? | ? | |
| Beggo | 755; Son of Gerard I of Paris and Rotrude | 806 – 28 October 816 | Pallars; Ribagorça | 28 October 816 aged 60-61 | Girardids | |
| Bera | 770 | 790–820 | Razès; Conflent | 844 aged 73-74? | ? | Nominated to three different counties in the Hispanic March. Conflent merged in Razès. |
| Bera | 770 | 801–820 | Barcelona | 844 aged 73-74? | ? | Nominated to three different counties in the Hispanic March. Conflent merged in Razès. |
| Bera | 770 | 817–820 | Girona; Besalú | 844 aged 73-74? | ? | Nominated to three different counties in the Hispanic March. Conflent merged in Razès. |
| Ermenguer | ? | 813–817 | Empúries | ? | ? | |
| Gaucelm | 796; Second son of William of Gellone and Cunegonde | 817–832 | Roussillon; Empúries | 834 aged 37-38 | Guilhelmids | |
| Gaucelm | 796; Second son of William of Gellone and Cunegonde | 828–832 | Razès | 834 aged 37-38 | Guilhelmids | |
| Rampon | 770 | 820–825 | Girona; Besalú; Barcelona; Razès | 825 aged 54-55? | ? | Osona merged in Barcelona from 820. |
| Bernard of Septimania | 795; First son of William of Gellone and Cunegonde | 825–832; 835–844 | Girona; Besalú; Barcelona; Razès | 844 aged 48-49 | Guilhelmids | Married Dhuoda of Gascony, daughter of the Duke of Gascony. |
| Bernard of Septimania | 795; First son of William of Gellone and Cunegonde | 835–844 | Pallars; Ribagorça | 844 aged 48-49 | Guilhelmids | Married Dhuoda of Gascony, daughter of the Duke of Gascony. |
| Berengar the Wise | 790; Son of Unruoch II of Friuli and Ingeltrude | 28 October 816 – 835 | Pallars; Ribagorça | 835 aged 44-45 | Unrochids | |
| Berengar the Wise | 790; Son of Unruoch II of Friuli and Ingeltrude | 832–835 | Girona; Besalú; Barcelona; Roussillon; Empúries; Razès | 835 aged 44-45 | Unrochids | |
| Sunifred I | ? First son of Bello of Carcassonne | 834–848 | Cerdanya | 848 | Bellonids | Married Ermesinde (in 840), and had offspring, which succeeded him; See Hereditary period below. |
| Sunifred I | ? First son of Bello of Carcassonne | 838–848 | Urgell | 848 | Bellonids | Married Ermesinde (in 840), and had offspring, which succeeded him; See Hereditary period below. |
| Sunifred I | ? First son of Bello of Carcassonne | 844–848 | Girona; Besalú; Barcelona | 848 | Bellonids | Married Ermesinde (in 840), and had offspring, which succeeded him; See Hereditary period below. |
| Sunyer I | ? Second son of Bello of Carcassonne | 835–848 | Roussillon | ? | Bellonids | Brother of Sunifred I. |
| Sunyer I | ? Second son of Bello of Carcassonne | 835–842; 843–848 | Empúries | ? | Bellonids | Brother of Sunifred I. |
| Alaric | ? | 842–843 | Empúries | ? | ? | |
| Argila | ? Son of Bera | 844–846 | Razès | 846 | ? | Son of Count Bera I. |
| Bera II | ? | 846–849 | Razès | 849 | ? | Also Count of Carcassonne. |
| Miro Eutili | ? | 849–850 | Razès | 850 | ? | Also Count of Carcassonne. |
| Fredelo | ? Son of Fulcoald of Rouergue and Senegund | 844–852 | Pallars; Ribagorça | 852 | ? | Also Count of Carcassonne. |
| Fredelo | ? Son of Fulcoald of Rouergue and Senegund | 850–852 | Razès | 852 | ? | Also Count of Carcassonne. |
| Wilfred | ? | 848–852 | Girona | ? | ? | |
| William of Septimania | 826; Son of Bernard of Septimania and Dhuoda of Gascony | 848–850 | Barcelona; Roussillon; Empúries | 850 aged 24-25 | Guilhelmids | Also Duke of Gascony. |
| Aleran of Troyes | ? | 850–852 | Barcelona; Roussillon; Empúries | ? | House of Blois (possibly) | Joint rulers. |
| Isembard of Vergy | ? | 850–852 | Barcelona; Roussillon; Empúries | ? | House of Vergy | Joint rulers. |
| Odalric | ? Son of Hunfrid, Margrave of Istria | 852–858 | Girona | 864 | ? | |
| Humfrid | ? | 858–864 | Roussillon; Barcelona | 864 | Hunfridings | |
| Humfrid | ? | 858-862 | Empúries; Girona | 864 | Hunfridings | |
| Otger | ? | 862–870 | Empúries; Girona | ? | ? | |
| Bernard of Gothia | ? Son of Bernard II, Count of Poitiers and Belihildis | 864–878 | Roussillon; Barcelona | After 879 | Guilhelmids | Also Count of Poitiers. |

== Hereditary Rulers ==
=== Catalan Counties under Bellonid dynasty ===
==== Partitions of the Catalan counties under Bellonid/Barcelona domain ====
County of Roussillon (878-1172) (Bellonid line) | County of Empúries (905-1402) (Barcelona line from 1325)
County of Barcelona (878-1410) (Barcelona line) | County of Besalú (988-1118) | County of Cerdanya (1st creation) (897-1118)
County of Urgell (992-1413) | County of Forcalquier (1129-1209) | Barcelona joined by the Kingdom of Aragon (1137)
County of Provence (1127-1267)
County of Cerdanya (2nd creation) (1162-1344)
Inherited by the Kingdom of Naples
Annexed to the Aragonese House of Trastámara | Annexed to the Aragonese House of Trastámara

==== Table of rulers ====
| Ruler | | Born | Reign | Ruling part/ County | Consort | Death | Notes |
|---|---|---|---|---|---|---|---|
| Wilfred I the Hairy; El Pilós | | c.840 Girona; Disputed filiation, Presumed (first) son of Sunifred, Count of Barcelona and Ermesinde | 878 – 897 | County of Barcelona | Guinidilda; 877 ten children | 897; Tremp aged 46–47 | Children of Sunifred, divided their lands. Wilfred was the first count to explicitly pass his titles to his children: with him begins the hereditary period in the Catalan counties. Radulf had no children and his county passed to his nephew Miro, Count of Cerdanya. |
| Miro I the Elder; El Vell | | c.840 Second son of Sunifred, Count of Barcelona and Ermesinde | 878 –895 | County of Roussillon | Quíxol one child | 896 aged 55-56 | Children of Sunifred, divided their lands. Wilfred was the first count to explicitly pass his titles to his children: with him begins the hereditary period in the Catalan counties. Radulf had no children and his county passed to his nephew Miro, Count of Cerdanya. |
| Radulf | | c.845 Third son of Sunifred, Count of Barcelona and Ermesinde | 878 –920 | County of Besalú | Unmarried | 920 aged 74–75? | Children of Sunifred, divided their lands. Wilfred was the first count to explicitly pass his titles to his children: with him begins the hereditary period in the Catalan counties. Radulf had no children and his county passed to his nephew Miro, Count of Cerdanya. |
Besalú briefly annexed to Barcelona
| Sunyer II | | c.840 First son of Sunyer I, Count of Empúries | 870 –894 | County of Empúries | Ermengarda four children | 915 aged 74–75 | Children of Sunyer I, ruled jointly. In 895, after Miro I's death, Sunyer II assumed his inheritance, and left sole control of Empúries to his brother. |
| Sunyer II | | c.840 First son of Sunyer I, Count of Empúries | 895 –915 | County of Roussillon | Ermengarda four children | 915 aged 74–75 | Children of Sunyer I, ruled jointly. In 895, after Miro I's death, Sunyer II assumed his inheritance, and left sole control of Empúries to his brother. |
| Dela | | c.840 Second son of Sunyer I, Count of Empúries | 870 –894 | County of Empúries | Cixilona two children | 894 aged 33–34 | Children of Sunyer I, ruled jointly. In 895, after Miro I's death, Sunyer II assumed his inheritance, and left sole control of Empúries to his brother. |
Empúries briefly annexed to Roussillon
| Wilfred II Borrell I (Guifré Borrell) | | c.874 Girona; First son of Wilfred I and Guinidilda | 897 – 26 April 911 | County of Barcelona | Garsenda; 898 one child | 26 April 911; Barcelona aged 36–37 | Children of Wilfred the Hairy, divided their inheritance. Wilfred had no children, and Barcelona passed to a younger brother, Sunyer, who didn't participate in the first division. Sunifred's part was eventually reunited with Barcelona. |
| Miro II the Younger; El Jove | | c.878 Second son of Wilfred I and Guinidilda | 897 – October 927 | County of Cerdanya | Ava of Pallars; 915 eight children | October 927 aged 48–49 | Children of Wilfred the Hairy, divided their inheritance. Wilfred had no children, and Barcelona passed to a younger brother, Sunyer, who didn't participate in the first division. Sunifred's part was eventually reunited with Barcelona. |
| Sunifred II | | c.880 Fourth son of Wilfred I and Guinidilda | 897 – 948 | County of Urgell | Adelaide of Barcelona Bonafilla (918-993) no children | 948 aged 67–68 | Children of Wilfred the Hairy, divided their inheritance. Wilfred had no children, and Barcelona passed to a younger brother, Sunyer, who didn't participate in the first division. Sunifred's part was eventually reunited with Barcelona. |
Urgell briefly annexed to Barcelona
| Sunyer | | c.890 Girona; Sixth son of Wilfred I and Guinidilda | 26 April 911 – 947 | County of Barcelona | Aimilda; 914 one child Richilda of Toulouse; 925 five children | 15 October 950; Lagrasse aged 59–60 | Younger brother of Wilfred II and Miro II, succeeded his brother in Barcelona. Abdicated. |
| Bencion | | c.870? First son of Sunyer II and Ermengarda | 915 – 1 September 916 | County of Roussillon | Godlana of Barcelona no children | 1 September 916 aged 45–46 | Children of Sunyer II, ruled jointly. Bencion was son-in-law of his uncle Miro the Elder, but was Gausbert who assured the continuity of the inheritance. |
| Gausbert | | c.870? Second son of Sunyer II and Ermengarda | 915 –931 | County of Roussillon | Trudegarda three children | 931 aged 69–70 | Children of Sunyer II, ruled jointly. Bencion was son-in-law of his uncle Miro the Elder, but was Gausbert who assured the continuity of the inheritance. |
| Regency of Ava of Pallars (927-942) | | | | | | | Children of Miro II, divided their inheritance. Wilfred was the last Catalan count that paid tribute to a Carolingian king. After Wilfred II's death with no descendants, Sunifred reunited Besalú with Cerdanya. However, as Sunifred didn't have children himself, the county passed to his younger brother. |
| Sunifred II | | 915; First son of Miro II and Ava of Pallars | October 927 – 30 October 968 | County of Cerdanya | Godlana of Barcelona no children | 30 October 968; Cuxa aged 52–53 | Children of Miro II, divided their inheritance. Wilfred was the last Catalan count that paid tribute to a Carolingian king. After Wilfred II's death with no descendants, Sunifred reunited Besalú with Cerdanya. However, as Sunifred didn't have children himself, the county passed to his younger brother. |
| Wilfred II | | c.920 Second son of Miro II and Ava of Pallars | October 927 – December 957 | County of Besalú | Unmarried | December 957; Besalú aged 36–37 | Children of Miro II, divided their inheritance. Wilfred was the last Catalan count that paid tribute to a Carolingian king. After Wilfred II's death with no descendants, Sunifred reunited Besalú with Cerdanya. However, as Sunifred didn't have children himself, the county passed to his younger brother. |
Besalú briefly annexed to Cerdanya
| Gausfred I | | c.900 Son of Gausbert and Trudegarda | 931 –991 | County of Roussillon | Ava Guisla of Rouergue four children Sybille no children | 991 aged 90–91? | |
| Miro I | | c.926 Barcelona; Second son of Sunyer and Richilda of Toulouse | 947 – 31 October 966 | County of Barcelona | Unmarried | 31 October 966; Barcelona aged 39–40 | Children of Sunyer, ruled jointly. In his testament, Borrell II, gave Barcelona, Girona and Osona to Ramon Borrell (992-1017), while Urgell went to Ermengol I (992-1010), so that the Count of Urgell title became separated from the House of Barcelona. |
| Borrell II | | c.927 Barcelona; Third son of Sunyer and Richilda of Toulouse | 947 – 30 September 992 | County of Barcelona | Luitgard of Toulouse; 968 five children Aimeruda (of Auvergne?); 980 no children | 30 September 992; Castellciutat aged 64–65 | Children of Sunyer, ruled jointly. In his testament, Borrell II, gave Barcelona, Girona and Osona to Ramon Borrell (992-1017), while Urgell went to Ermengol I (992-1010), so that the Count of Urgell title became separated from the House of Barcelona. |
| Miro III; El Bonfill (The Good Son?) | | c.920 Third son of Miro II and Ava of Pallars | 968 –22 January 984 | County of Cerdanya | Unmarried | 22 January 984; Girona aged 63–64 | Also Bishop of Girona (968-984). |
| Oliba; Cabreta (?) | | c.920 Fourth son of Miro II and Ava of Pallars | 22 January 984 –988 | County of Cerdanya | Ermengarda of Roussillon-Empúries; 966 five children | 990; Montecassino aged 69–70 | Abdicated to his children in 988 to follow a monastic life. |
| Ramon Borrell | | 26 May 972; Girona; Son of Borrell II and Luitgard of Toulouse | 30 September 992 –8 September 1017 | County of Barcelona | Ermesinde of Carcassonne; 993 two children | 8 September 1017; Barcelona aged 45 | Children of Ramon Borrell, divided their inheritance. |
| Ermengol I of Córdoba; El de Córdoba | | 973; Barcelona; Second son of Borrell II and Luitgard of Toulouse | 30 September 992 – 1 September 1010 | County of Urgell | Tetberga of Gévaudan c.1000 two children | 1 September 1010; Córdoba aged 36–37 | Children of Ramon Borrell, divided their inheritance. |
| Regency of Ermengarda of Roussillon-Empúries (988-994) | | | | | | | Children of Oliba Cabreta, divided the county. Oliba abdicated of Berga to become abbot and then Bishop of Vic (1018-1046). |
| Bernard I Taillefer; Tallaferro | | c.970 First son of Oliba Cabreta and Ermengarda of Roussillon-Empúries | 988 – October 1020 | County of Besalú | Toda of Provence; 992 eight children | October 1020; Provence aged 49–50 | Children of Oliba Cabreta, divided the county. Oliba abdicated of Berga to become abbot and then Bishop of Vic (1018-1046). |
| Wilfred II | | c.970 Second son of Oliba Cabreta and Ermengarda of Roussillon-Empúries | 988 – 1035 | County of Cerdanya | Guisla of Pallars c.1006 (c.1020) eight children | 31 July 1049; Abbey of Saint-Martin-du-Canigou aged 78–79 | Children of Oliba Cabreta, divided the county. Oliba abdicated of Berga to become abbot and then Bishop of Vic (1018-1046). |
| Oliba | | 971; Third son of Oliba Cabreta and Ermengarda of Roussillon-Empúries | 988 – 1002 | County of Cerdanya (at Berga) | Unmarried | 31 October 1046; Cuxa aged 74–75 | Children of Oliba Cabreta, divided the county. Oliba abdicated of Berga to become abbot and then Bishop of Vic (1018-1046). |
In 1002 Berga re-joined Cardanya
| Hugh I | | c.965 First son of Gausfred I and Ava Guisla of Rouergue | 991 – 1040 | County of Empúries | Guisla of Béziers five children | 1040 aged 74–75 | Children of Gausfred I, divided their inheritance. |
| Giselbert I | | c.965 Third son of Gausfred I and Ava Guisla of Rouergue | 991 – 1014 | County of Roussillon | Beliarda three children | 1014 aged 48–49 | Children of Gausfred I, divided their inheritance. |
| Regency of Ramon Borrell, Count of Barcelona (1010-1018) | | | | | | | Began a war of conquest alongside his uncle and regent. Died in pilgrimage. |
| Ermengol II the Pilgrim; El Pelegrí | | 1009; Son of Ermengol I and Tetberga of Gévaudan | 1 September 1010 – 1038 | County of Urgell | Arsenda of Béziers; 1026 no children Velasquita-Constance of Besalú; 1030 one child | 1038; Jerusalem aged 26–27 | Began a war of conquest alongside his uncle and regent. Died in pilgrimage. |
| Gausfred II | | c.1000 Son of Giselbert I and Beliarda | 1014 – 1074 | County of Roussillon | Adelaide five children | 1074 aged 73–74 | |
| Regency of Ermesinde of Carcassonne (1017-1021) | | | | | | | |
| Berenguer Ramon I the Crooked; El Corbat | | 1004; Son of Ramon Borrell and Ermesinde of Carcassonne | 8 September 1017 – 31 March 1035 | County of Barcelona | Sancha Sánchez of Castile; 1021 two children Guisla de Lluçà; 1027 three children | 31 March 1035; Barcelona aged 30–31 | |
| William I the Fat; El Gras | | c.995 Son of Bernard I and Toda of Provence | October 1020 – 1052 | County of Besalú | Adelaide (of Provence?); 1020 three children | 1052 aged 56–57 | |
| Regency of Ermesinde of Carcassonne (1035-1039) | | | | | | | Children of Berenguer Ramon, divided their inheritance, which was reunited after William's abdication in 1054. Ramon Berenguer was the first to have the intention of creating a Principality of Catalonia, ideal then applied by his descendant Alfonso II of Aragon from 1162. Some authors argue that he may have ruled with his wife Almodis de La Marche, although her status as sovereign is very disputed. |
| Ramon Berenguer I the Old; El Vell | | 1023; Girona; Son of Berenguer Ramon I and Sancha Sánchez of Castile | 31 March 1035 – 26 June 1076 | County of Barcelona | Élisabeth de Nîmes; 1039 three children Blanche de Narbonne; 16 March 1051 (annulled 1052) no children Almodis de La Marche; 1056; Barcelona (together since 1052) four children | 26 June 1076; Barcelona aged 52–53 | Children of Berenguer Ramon, divided their inheritance, which was reunited after William's abdication in 1054. Ramon Berenguer was the first to have the intention of creating a Principality of Catalonia, ideal then applied by his descendant Alfonso II of Aragon from 1162. Some authors argue that he may have ruled with his wife Almodis de La Marche, although her status as sovereign is very disputed. |
| Regency of Guisla de Lluçà (1035-1054) | | | | | | | Children of Berenguer Ramon, divided their inheritance, which was reunited after William's abdication in 1054. Ramon Berenguer was the first to have the intention of creating a Principality of Catalonia, ideal then applied by his descendant Alfonso II of Aragon from 1162. Some authors argue that he may have ruled with his wife Almodis de La Marche, although her status as sovereign is very disputed. |
| William | | 1028; Girona; Son of Berenguer Ramon I and Guisla de Lluçà | 31 March 1035 – 1054 | County of Barcelona (at Osona and Manresa) | Unmarried | 1057 aged 28–29 | Children of Berenguer Ramon, divided their inheritance, which was reunited after William's abdication in 1054. Ramon Berenguer was the first to have the intention of creating a Principality of Catalonia, ideal then applied by his descendant Alfonso II of Aragon from 1162. Some authors argue that he may have ruled with his wife Almodis de La Marche, although her status as sovereign is very disputed. |
Osona and Manresa reabsorbed in Barcelona
| Ramon | | c.1010 First son of Wilfred II and Guisla of Pallars | 1035 – 1068 | County of Cerdanya | Adelaide c.1040 two children | 1068 aged 57–58 | Children of Wilfred II, divided their inheritance. |
| Bernard I | | c.1010 Second son of Wilfred II and Guisla of Pallars | 1035 – 1050 | County of Cerdanya (at Berga) | Unmarried | 1050 aged 39–40 | Children of Wilfred II, divided their inheritance. |
| Regency of Velasquita-Constance of Besalú (1038-1050) | | | | | | | He was given the rule of Barbastro following its conquest during the Crusade of Barbastro (1064). |
| Ermengol III of Barbastro; El de Barbastre | | June 1032; Monzón; Son of Ermengol II and Velasquita-Constance of Besalú | 1038 – 17 April 1066 | County of Urgell | Adelaide of Besalú; 1050 two children Clemence of Bigorre; 1055 three children Sancha of Aragon; 1063 no children | 17 April 1066; Barbastro aged 33–34 | He was given the rule of Barbastro following its conquest during the Crusade of Barbastro (1064). |
| Ponce I | | 990; Son of Hugh I and Guisla of Béziers | 1040 – 1078 | County of Empúries | Adelaide of Besalú; 3 August 1364 eight children | 1078 aged 87–88? | Transferred the viscounty of Peralada to his son Berengar. |
| Berenguer | | c.1010 Third son of Wilfred II and Guisla of Pallars | 1050 | County of Cerdanya (at Berga) | Unmarried | 1093 aged 57–58 | Younger brother of Bernard, succeeded him in Berga, but abdicated of the county to Cerdanya to become Bishop of Girona (1050-1093). |
Berga rejoined Cerdanya
| William II Trunus; El Tro | | c.1020 First son of William I and Adelaide (of Provence?) | 1052 – 1066 | 1066 aged 45–46 | County of Besalú | Stephanie (of Provence?) two children | |
| Regency of Sancha of Aragon (1066-1075) | | | | | | | His second marriage expanded his authority into the Provençal County of Forcalquier. |
| Ermengol IV of Gerb; El de Gerb | | 1056; Son of Ermengol III and Adelaide of Besalú | 17 April 1066 – 11 March 1092 | County of Urgell | Lucie of Upper Pallars (d.bef.1079); 1077 one child Adelaide, Countess of Forcalquier; 1079 two children | 11 March 1092; Gerb aged 35–36 | His second marriage expanded his authority into the Provençal County of Forcalquier. |
| Bernard II | | c.1020 Second son of William I and Adelaide (of Provence?) | 1066 – 1097 | County of Besalú | Ermengard of Empúries one child | 1097 aged 56–57 | Probably intended as regent for his nephew, he took his place and ruled until his own death. |
| William I Raymond | | c.1040 Son of Sunyer II and Ermengarda | 1068 – 1095 | County of Cerdanya | Adelaide of Carcassonne no children Isabella of Urgell; 1071 no children Sancha of Barcelona c.1080 two children | 1095 aged 54–55 | |
| Giselbert II | | c.1025 Son of Gausfred II and Ava Guisla of Rouergue | 1074 – 1102 | County of Roussillon | Stephanie one child | 1102 aged 76–77 | Made a treaty with his cousin Ponce I of Empúries. |
| Ramon Berenguer II the Towhead; El Cap d'Estopes | | c.1053 Girona; Twin children of Ramon Berenguer I and Almodis de La Marche | 26 June 1076 – 6 December 1082 | County of Barcelona | Mafalda of Apulia-Calabria; 1078; Barcelona three children | 6 December 1082; Sant Feliu de Buixalleu aged 28–29 | Twin children of Ramon Berenguer and Almodis, ascended jointly. Berenguer Ramon probably perpetrated his brother's murder (hence his cognomen). After the event, his nephew was associated to the co-rulership. |
| Berenguer Ramon II the Fratricide; El Fratricida | | c.1053 Girona; Twin children of Ramon Berenguer I and Almodis de La Marche | 26 June 1076 – 1097 | County of Barcelona | Unmarried | 1097; Jerusalem aged 43–44 | Twin children of Ramon Berenguer and Almodis, ascended jointly. Berenguer Ramon probably perpetrated his brother's murder (hence his cognomen). After the event, his nephew was associated to the co-rulership. |
| Hugh II | | 1035; Son of Ponce I and Adelaide of Besalú | 1078 – 1116 | County of Empúries | Sancha of Urgell c.1070 six children | 1116 aged 80–81 | His brother Berenguer was the forefather of the Viscounts of Rocabertí. |
| Ramon Berenguer III the Great; El Gran | | 11 November 1082; Rodez; Son of Ramon Berenguer II and Mafalda of Apulia-Calabria | 6 December 1082 –19 July 1131 | County of Barcelona | María Rodríguez de Vivar; 1103 two children Almodis de Mortain; 1106 no children Douce I, Countess of Provence; 3 February 1112; Arles seven children | 19 July 1131; Barcelona aged 48 | Ruled jointly with his uncle until 1097. His last marriage with the heiress of the County of Provence brought it under Barcelona domain. His reign saw a proliferation of Provençal culture in Catalonia. |
| Ramon Berenguer III the Great; El Gran | | 11 November 1082; Rodez; Son of Ramon Berenguer II and Mafalda of Apulia-Calabria | 1112 – 19 July 1131 | County of Provence | María Rodríguez de Vivar; 1103 two children Almodis de Mortain; 1106 no children Douce I, Countess of Provence; 3 February 1112; Arles seven children | 19 July 1131; Barcelona aged 48 | Ruled jointly with his uncle until 1097. His last marriage with the heiress of the County of Provence brought it under Barcelona domain. His reign saw a proliferation of Provençal culture in Catalonia. |
| Ermengol V of Mollerussa; El de Mollerussa | | 1078; Son of Ermengol IV and Lucie of Upper Pallars | 11 March 1092 – 11 September 1102 | County of Urgell | María Pérez of Valladolid; 1095 five children | 11 September 1102; Mollerussa aged 23–24 | Children of Ermengol IV. Ermengol V was the first count since Ermengol I to not be a minor at the time of his accession. His marriage brought Urgell into the Leonese-Castilian court. William received his mother's inheritance in Forcalquier. |
| William III | | c.1080 Son of Ermengol IV and Adelaide, Countess of Forcalquier | 1129 –7 October 1129 | County of Forcalquier | Gersende of Albon c.1080 two children | 7 October 1129; Avignon aged 48–49 | Children of Ermengol IV. Ermengol V was the first count since Ermengol I to not be a minor at the time of his accession. His marriage brought Urgell into the Leonese-Castilian court. William received his mother's inheritance in Forcalquier. |
| William II Jordan | | 1079; First son of William I and Sancha of Barcelona | 1095 – August 1109 | County of Cerdanya | Unmarried | August 1109; Tripoli aged 29–30 | Died in crusade. He left no heirs and was succeeded by his brother. |
| Bernard III | | c.1065 Son of William II and Stephanie (of Provence?) | 1097 – 1111 | County of Besalú | Ximena, Countess of Osona; 1 October 1107 no children | 1111 aged 45–46 | |
Besalú annexed to Barcelona
| Girard I | | c.1070? Son of Giselbert II and Stephanie | 1102 – 1113 | County of Roussillon | Agnes two children | 1113 aged 62–63 | |
| Regency of Pedro Ansúrez, Lord of Valladolid (1102-1108) | | | | | | | His close bonds with the Castlian court (started by his father) rendered him his nickname. |
| Ermengol VI of Castile; El de Castella | | 1096; Valladolid; Son of Ermengol V andMaría Pérez of Valladolid | 1102 – 28 June 1154 | County of Urgell | Arsenda of Cabrera; 1119 or 1126 one child Elvira Rodríguez de Lara; 1135 three children | 28 June 1154 aged 57–58 | His close bonds with the Castlian court (started by his father) rendered him his nickname. |
| Bernard | | c.1080 Second son of William I and Sancha of Barcelona | August 1109 – 1118 | County of Cerdanya | Teresa of Urgell no children Sancha de Álvar no children | 1118 aged 37–38 | |
Cerdanya annexed to Barcelona
| Regency of Arnau Gausfred of Roussillon (1113-1121) | | | | | | | |
| Gausfred III | | 1103; Son of Girard I and Agnes | 1113 – 24 February 1164 | County of Roussillon | Ermengarde of Béziers (d.1156) c.1110 (annulled 1152) one child | 24 February 1164 aged 60–61 | |
| Ponce II (Ponç Hug I) | | 1070; Son of Hugh II and Sancha of Urgell | 1116 – 1154 | County of Empúries | Brunesilda (d.c.1175) one child | 1154 aged 83–84 | |
| Guigues | | c.1090? First son of William III of Forcalquier and Gersende of Albon | 7 October 1129 – 1149 | County of Forcalquier | Unknown one child | 1149 aged 58–59 | His child probably predeceased him, as he was succeeded by his brother. |
| Ramon Berenguer IV the Saint; El Sant | | c.1113 Barcelona or Rodez; First son of Ramon Berenguer III and Douce I, Countess of Provence | 19 July 1131 – 6 August 1162 | County of Barcelona | Petronilla, Queen of Aragon; August 1150; Lleida five children | 6 August 1162; Borgo San Dalmazzo aged 48–49 | Children of Ramon Berenguer III, divided their inheritance. While Ramon Berenguer IV's marriage with the queen of Aragon united Barcelona and the Kingdom of Aragon, in Provence, Berenguer Ramon took an offensive against Genoa. |
| Berenguer Ramon I | | February 1114; Second son of Ramon Berenguer I and Douce I, Countess of Provence | 19 July 1131 – March 1144 | County of Provence | Beatrice of Melgueil c.1135 one child | March 1144; Melgueil aged 30 | Children of Ramon Berenguer III, divided their inheritance. While Ramon Berenguer IV's marriage with the queen of Aragon united Barcelona and the Kingdom of Aragon, in Provence, Berenguer Ramon took an offensive against Genoa. |
| Regency of Ramon Berenguer IV, Count of Barcelona (1144–1157) | | | | | | | In August 1161, he travelled to Turin with his uncle to obtain confirmation of his countship in Provence from the Emperor Frederick I, for Provence was legally a fief of the Holy Roman Empire. |
| Ramon Berenguer II | | c.1135 Son of Berenguer Ramon I and Beatrice of Melgueil | March 1144 – March 1166 | County of Provence | Richeza of Poland; 17 November 1161 one child | March 1166; Nice aged 30–31 | In August 1161, he travelled to Turin with his uncle to obtain confirmation of his countship in Provence from the Emperor Frederick I, for Provence was legally a fief of the Holy Roman Empire. |
| Bertrand I | | 1104; Second son of William III of Forcalquier and Gersende of Albon | 1149 – 1151 | County of Forcalquier | Josserande de la Flotte; 1130 three children | 1151 aged 46–47 | |
| Bertrand II | | c.1130? First son of Bertrand I and Josserande de la Flotte | 1151 – 13 May 1207 | County of Forcalquier | Cecilia of Béziers two children | 13 May 1207 aged 76–77 | Left no male heirs, and was succeeded by his brother. |
| Ermengol VII of Valencia; El de València | | c.1130 Son of Ermengol VI and Arsenda of Cabrera | 28 June 1154 – 11 August 1184 | County of Urgell | Douce of Foix; 1157 two children | 11 August 1184; Requena aged 26–27 | Continued the Castilian bonds of his ancestors: inherited Castilian land from his grandmother and was Majordomo of Ferdinand II of León. |
| Hugh III | | c.1110/20 Son of Ponce II and Brunesilda | 1154 – 1173 | County of Empúries | Jussiana d'Entença five children | 1173 aged 62–63? | |
| Petronilla | | 29 June 1136; Huesca; Daughter of Ramiro II of Aragon and Agnes of Aquitaine | 6 August 1162 – 18 July 1164 | County of Barcelona (with Kingdom of Aragon) | Ramon Berenguer IV; August 1150; Lleida five children | 15 October 1173; Barcelona aged 37 | After the death of her husband, she, as Queen of Aragon, assumed the reins of his lands until her own abdication. |
| Girard II | | c.1120? Son of Gausfred III and Ermengarde of Béziers | 24 February 1164 – July 1172 | County of Roussillon | Unmarried | July 1172 aged 74–75 | His will determined that the county should be inherited by his relative, Alfonso II of Aragon. |
Roussillon annexed to Barcelona-Aragon, then aligned with Cerdanya
| Regency of Richeza of Poland (1166-1167) | | | | | | | She ruled a few months, as her half brother-in-law, Alfonso II of Aragon, claimed Provence for himself on the basis of the imperial enfeoffment of 1162. |
| Douce II | | c.1162 Daughter of Ramon Berenguer II and Richeza of Poland | March 1166 – 1167 | County of Provence | Unmarried | 1172; Nice aged 9–10 | She ruled a few months, as her half brother-in-law, Alfonso II of Aragon, claimed Provence for himself on the basis of the imperial enfeoffment of 1162. |
| Council of Regency (1164-1172) | | | | | | | Formal union of the Kingdom of Aragon and Barcelona, and with various feudal dependencies. In 1173, Alfonso, who held Provence, gave it to his younger brother, Ramon Berenguer. |
| Alphonse I the Troubadour; El Trobador | Alfons I | 1-25 March 1157; Huesca; Son of Ramon Berenguer IV and Petronilla | 18 July 1164 – 25 April 1196 | County of Barcelona (with Kingdom of Aragon) | Sancha of Castile; 18 January 1174; Zaragoza seven children | 25 April 1196; Perpignan aged 44 | Formal union of the Kingdom of Aragon and Barcelona, and with various feudal dependencies. In 1173, Alfonso, who held Provence, gave it to his younger brother, Ramon Berenguer. |
| Alphonse I the Troubadour; El Trobador | Alfons I | 1-25 March 1157; Huesca; Son of Ramon Berenguer IV and Petronilla | 1167 – 1173 1185 – 1195 | County of Provence | Sancha of Castile; 18 January 1174; Zaragoza seven children | 25 April 1196; Perpignan aged 44 | Formal union of the Kingdom of Aragon and Barcelona, and with various feudal dependencies. In 1173, Alfonso, who held Provence, gave it to his younger brother, Ramon Berenguer. |
| Peter - Ramon Berenguer III | | c.1158 Son of Count Ramon Berenguer IV of Barcelona and Petronilla of Aragon | 1162 – 1168 | County of Cerdanya (with Roussillon) | Unmarried | 5 April 1181; Montpellier aged 22–23 | Abdicated of Cerdanya to his brother Sancho. In 1173, assuming the county of Provence, changed his name to Ramon Berenguer. In 1176, he joined Sancho in conquering Nice from Genoa. He was assassinated. |
| Peter - Ramon Berenguer III | | c.1158 Son of Count Ramon Berenguer IV of Barcelona and Petronilla of Aragon | 1173 – 5 April 1181 | County of Provence | Unmarried | 5 April 1181; Montpellier aged 22–23 | Abdicated of Cerdanya to his brother Sancho. In 1173, assuming the county of Provence, changed his name to Ramon Berenguer. In 1176, he joined Sancho in conquering Nice from Genoa. He was assassinated. |
| Sancho | | c.1161 Son of Count Ramon Berenguer IV of Barcelona and Petronilla of Aragon | 1168 – 1223 | County of Cerdanya (with Roussillon) | Ermesinde of Rocabertí; 1184 one child Sancha Núñez de Lara; 1185 one child | 1223; Montpellier aged 61–62 | Received from his brother the counties of Cerdanya and Roussillon, and in 1181, received also the County of Roussillon, in the sequence of the same brother's death. In 1184, Sancho signed a treaty of alliance with the count of Forcalquier, the count of Toulouse and the Republic of Genoa agreeing to oppose the king of Aragon's efforts to dominate Genoa and to take the city of Marseille from him. Abdicated from Provence in 1185, but ruled in Cerdanya-Roussillon until his death. |
| Sancho | | c.1161 Son of Count Ramon Berenguer IV of Barcelona and Petronilla of Aragon | 1181 – 1185 | County of Provence | Ermesinde of Rocabertí; 1184 one child Sancha Núñez de Lara; 1185 one child | 1223; Montpellier aged 61–62 | Received from his brother the counties of Cerdanya and Roussillon, and in 1181, received also the County of Roussillon, in the sequence of the same brother's death. In 1184, Sancho signed a treaty of alliance with the count of Forcalquier, the count of Toulouse and the Republic of Genoa agreeing to oppose the king of Aragon's efforts to dominate Genoa and to take the city of Marseille from him. Abdicated from Provence in 1185, but ruled in Cerdanya-Roussillon until his death. |
| Ponce III (Ponç Hug II) | | 1135; Son of Hugh III and Jussiana d'Entença | 1173 – 1200 | County of Empúries | Adelaide of Montcada two children Ermesinde of Peratellada no children | 1200 aged 64–65 | |
| Ermengol VIII of Sant Hilari; El de Sant Hilari | | 1158; Son of Ermengol VII and Douce of Foix | 11 August 1184 – 1209 | County of Urgell | Elvira Núñez de Lara (1145-1220) one child | 1209; Sant Hilari Sacalm aged 50–51 | Ensured his daughter's succession to the county. |
| Alphonse II | | 1180; Barcelona; Second son of Alfonso I and Sancha of Castile | 1195 – 2 February 1209 | County of Provence | Garsenda, Countess of Forcalquier; July 1193; Aix-en-Provence one child | 2 February 1209; Palermo aged 28–29 | His reign was marked by his conflicts with the count of Forcalquier, to whose granddaughter he was married. |
| Peter I the Catholic; El Catòlic | Peter I | July 1178; Huesca; First son of Alfons I and Sancha of Castile | 25 April 1196 – 13 September 1213 | County of Barcelona (with Kingdom of Aragon) | Marie of Montpellier; 15 June 1204 two children | 12 September 1213; Battle of Muret aged 35 | Died in the Battle of Muret, in which he retaliated the Cathar Crusade. |
| Hugh IV | | 1170; Son of Ponce III and Adelaide of Montcada | 1200 – April 1230 | County of Empúries | Maria, Lady of Vilademuls; 19 June 1373 five children | April 1230; Mallorca aged 59–60 | Joined the Conquest of Majorca. |
| William IV | | c.1130 Second son of Bertrand I and Josserande de la Flotte | 13 May 1207 – 7 October 1209 | County of Forcalquier | Adelaide of Béziers one child | 7 October 1209 aged 78–79 | Left a daughter, Garsenda, who predeceased him; he was succeeded by his granddaughter, also named Garsenda. |
| Garsenda | | c.1180 Daughter of Rainou of Sabran and Garsenda of Forcalquier | 7 October 1209 – 1220 | County of Forcalquier (half 1, House of Sabran) | Alfonso II, Count of Provence; July 1193; Aix-en-Provence one child | 1242 aged 60–61 | Despite Garsenda being the recognised heir of William IV, his sister Alice claimed the county for herself, with the aid of her son. Garsenda's part was, formally in 1209, and de facto in 1220, absorbed by Provence. |
| Alice | | c.1140 Daughter of Bertrand I and Josserande de la Flotte | 7 October 1209 – 1219 | County of Forcalquier (half 2) | Guiraud II Amic three children | 1219 aged 78-79? | Despite Garsenda being the recognised heir of William IV, his sister Alice claimed the county for herself, with the aid of her son. Garsenda's part was, formally in 1209, and de facto in 1220, absorbed by Provence. |
| William of Sabran | | c.1190 Daughter of Guiraud II Amic and Alice | 7 October 1209 – 1250? | County of Forcalquier (half 2) | Bertranda of Porcelet no children Marguerite de Salins; 1211 three children | 1250 aged 59-60? | Despite Garsenda being the recognised heir of William IV, his sister Alice claimed the county for herself, with the aid of her son. Garsenda's part was, formally in 1209, and de facto in 1220, absorbed by Provence. |
Forcalquier (both parts) annexed to Provence
| Regency of Garsenda, Countess of Forcalquier (1209–1220) | | | | | | | Supporter of the Provençal lyric and culture and the Albigensian Crusade. He also helped his father-in-law in his conflict with Turin and Guigues VI of Viennois. His surviving four daughters all married kings, causing a dispute about his succession. |
| Ramon Berenguer IV | | 1198; Son of Alfonso II and Garsenda, Countess of Forcalquier | February 1209 – 19 August 1245 | County of Provence | Beatrice of Savoy; 5 June 1219; Aix-en-Provence six children | 19 August 1245; Aix-en-Provence aged 46–47 | Supporter of the Provençal lyric and culture and the Albigensian Crusade. He also helped his father-in-law in his conflict with Turin and Guigues VI of Viennois. His surviving four daughters all married kings, causing a dispute about his succession. |
| Regency of Elvira Núnez de Lara (1209-1220) | | | | | | | Made a treaty of concubinage with James I of Aragon in 1209, and was his concubine until 1228. Some authors argue that the claimant Guerau IV of Cabrera had effective control of the county during her stay in the Aragonese court (1213-1228). In 1229, she married Peter of Portugal, and made him her co-ruler. |
| Aurembiaix | | 1196; Balaguer; Daughter of Ermengol VIII and Elvira Núnez de Lara | 1209 – 1231 | County of Urgell | Álvaro Pérez de Castro; 1212 (annulled 1228) no children Peter of Portugal; 1229 no children | 1231; Balagueraged 34–35 | Made a treaty of concubinage with James I of Aragon in 1209, and was his concubine until 1228. Some authors argue that the claimant Guerau IV of Cabrera had effective control of the county during her stay in the Aragonese court (1213-1228). In 1229, she married Peter of Portugal, and made him her co-ruler. |
| Peter (I) of Portugal | | 23 February 1187; Coimbra; Sixth son of Sancho I of Portugal and Dulce of Aragon | 1229 – 1231 | County of Urgell | Aurembiaix, Countess of Urgell; 1229 no children | 2 June 1258; Balearic Islands aged 71 | Co-ruler with his wife. He then ruled the Balearic Islands (1231–44 and 1254–56). |
| Regency of Sancho, Count of Cerdanya (1213-1218) | | | | | | | In his reign, by the Treaty of Corbeil (1258) with Louis IX of France, Aragon formally renounced all possessions beyond the Pyrenees; In compensation, Aragon-Barcelona expands its borders south against the Moors; Aragon conquers also the Balearic Islands, where it is established the Kingdom of Majorca. |
| James I the Conqueror; El Conqueridor | James I | 2 February 1208; Montpellier; Son of Peter I the Catholic and Marie of Montpellier | 13 September 1213 – 27 July 1276 | County of Barcelona (with Kingdom of Aragon) | Eleanor of Castile; 6 February 1221; Ágreda (annulled 1229) one child Violant of Hungary; 8 September 1235; Barcelona ten children Teresa Gil de Vidaure (lover, then wife); 1255 (uncanonical marriage, repudiated 1260) two children | 27 July 1276; Valencia aged 68 | In his reign, by the Treaty of Corbeil (1258) with Louis IX of France, Aragon formally renounced all possessions beyond the Pyrenees; In compensation, Aragon-Barcelona expands its borders south against the Moors; Aragon conquers also the Balearic Islands, where it is established the Kingdom of Majorca. |
| Nuño Sancho | | 1185; Son of Sancho and Sancha Núñez de Lara | 1223 – 1242 | County of Cerdanya (with Roussillon) | Petronilla, Countess of Bigorre; 1215 (annulled 1216) no children Teresa López de Haro; 1234 no children | 1242 aged 56–57 | After his death without heirs, the county was briefly annexed to Barcelona-Aragon. |
Cerdanya-Roussillon briefly annexed to Barcelona-Aragon
| Ponce IV (Ponç Hug III) | | 1205; Son of Hugh IV and Maria of Vilademuls | April 1230 – 1269 | County of Empúries | Benedetta of Torres no children Teresa Fernández de Lara; 1234 four children | 1269 aged 63–64 | His brother, Ponce Hugh, was the forefather of the House of Entença. |
| Ponce | | 1216; First son of Guerau IV de Cabrera and Eylo Pérez de Castro | 1231 – 1243 | County of Urgell (House of Cabrera) | María González Girón six children | 1243 aged 26–27 | Grandson of Marquesa, daughter of Ermengol VII. After a period of dynastic squabbles, James I of Aragon acknowledged him as the successor to the County of Urgell. |
| 1st regency of María González Girón and James of Cervera (1243) | | | | | | | Died as a minor. He was succeeded by his brother. |
| Ermengol IX | | 1235; First son of Ponce and María González Girón | 1243 | County of Urgell (House of Cabrera) | Unmarried | 1243; Balaguer aged 7–8 | Died as a minor. He was succeeded by his brother. |
| 2nd regency of María González Girón and James of Cervera (1243-1253) | | | | | | | |
| Álvaro the Castilian; El Castellà | | 1239; Burgos; Second son of Ponce and María González Girón | 1243 – 1268 | County of Urgell (House of Cabrera) | Constance of Béarn one child Cecilia of Foix; 1256 three children | 1268; Foix aged 28–29 | |
| Beatrice | | 1229; Daughter of Ramon Berenguer IV and Beatrice of Savoy | 19 August 1245 – 23 September 1267 | County of Provence | Charles I, King of Sicily; 31 January 1246; Aix-en-Provence seven children | 23 September 1267; Nocera Inferiore aged 37–38 | Her inheritance caused tense relations with her sisters; Her husband installed his French court in Provence and, after her death, inherited the county. |
Provence annexed to the Kingdom of Naples
| Regency of Cecilia of Foix (1268-1270); Regency of Roger-Bernard III, Count of Foix (1268-1278) | | | | | | | |
| Ermengol X | | 1254; Son of Álvaro and Cecilia of Foix | 1268 – 1314 | County of Urgell (House of Cabrera) | Sybille of Montcada no children Faydida of L'Isle-Jourdain; 1300 no children | 1314; Camporrélls aged 59–60 | |
| Hugh V | | 1240; Son of Ponce IV and Teresa Fernández de Lara | 1269 – 1277 | County of Empúries | Sybilla de Palau; 1262 two children | 1277; Mallorca aged 59–60 | |
| Peter II the Great; El Gran | Peter II | July or August 1240; Valencia; Son of James I and Violant of Hungary | 27 July 1276 – 2 November 1285 | County of Barcelona (with Kingdom of Aragon) | Constance of Sicily; 13 June 1262; Montpellier six children | 2 November 1285; Vilafranca del Penedès aged 45 | Children of James I, divided their possessions. Peter kept Aragon and the majority of the counties, and James inherited Majorca and the more remote counties (Roussillon and Cerdanya). In Peter's reign, Aragon conquers the Kingdom of Sicily, during the Sicilian Vespers. |
| James II | James I | 31 May 1243; Montpellier; Son of James I of Aragon and Violant of Hungary | 27 July 1276 – 29 May 1311 | County of Cerdanya-Roussillon (with Kingdom of Majorca, 1276–86; 1295–1311) | Esclaramunda of Foix; 1275 six children | 29 May 1311; Palma de Mallorca aged 68 | Children of James I, divided their possessions. Peter kept Aragon and the majority of the counties, and James inherited Majorca and the more remote counties (Roussillon and Cerdanya). In Peter's reign, Aragon conquers the Kingdom of Sicily, during the Sicilian Vespers. |
| Ponce V (Ponç Hug IV) | | 1264; Son of Hugh V and Sybilla de Palau | 1277 – 1313 | County of Empúries | Marquesa, Viscountess of Cabrera; 1282 three children | 1313 aged 48–49 | |
| Alphonse II the Liberal; El Liberal | Alfons II | 4 November 1265; Valencia; Son of Peter II and Constance of Sicily | 2 November 1285 – 18 June 1291 | County of Barcelona (with Kingdom of Aragon) | Eleanor of England; 15 August 1290 (by proxy and not consummated) no children | 18 June 1291; Barcelona aged 27 | |
| James II the Just; El Just | James II | 10 August 1267; Valencia; Son of Peter II and Constance of Sicily | 18 June 1291 – 2 November 1327 | County of Barcelona (with Kingdom of Aragon) | Isabella of Castile; 1 December 1291; Soria no children Blanche of Anjou; 29 October or 1 November 1295; Vilabertran ten children Marie de Lusignan; 15 June 1315 (by proxy); Nicosia; 27 November 1315 (in person); Girona no children Elisenda de Montcada; 25 December 1322; Tarragona no children | 5 November 1327; Barcelona aged 60 | |
| Sancho | | 1276; Perpignan; Son of James II of Majorca and Esclaramunda of Foix | 29 May 1311 – 4 September 1324 | County of Cerdanya-Roussillon (with Kingdom of Majorca) | Maria of Naples; 20 September 1304 no children | 4 September 1324; Formiguera aged 48 | |
| Ponce VI; Malgaulí (?) (Ponç Hug V) | | 1290; Son of Ponce V and Marquesa, Viscountess of Cabrera | 1313 – 1322 | County of Empúries | Sybilla of Narbonne no children Elisabeth of Sicily; 1313 one child | 1322 aged 31–32 | |
| Teresa | | 1300; Daughter of Gombau d'Entença and Constance of Antillón | 1314 – 20 October 1327 | County of Urgell (House of Entença) | Alfonso IV of Aragon; 1314; Lerida seven children | 20 October 1327; Zaragoza aged 26–27 | Daughter of Constance, niece of Ermengol X. She married the heir to the crown of Aragon, and by this, she returned the county to the House of Barcelona. |
| Regency of Elisabeth of Sicily (1322) | | | | | | | Deposed because she was a minor, and died as so. The county passed to Hug de Cardona, the nearest relative of the family. |
| Marquesa | | 1322; Daughter of Ponce VI and Elisabeth of Sicily | 1322 | County of Empúries | Unmarried | 1327 aged 4–5 | Deposed because she was a minor, and died as so. The county passed to Hug de Cardona, the nearest relative of the family. |
| Hugh VI | | 1307; Son of Ramon Folch VI of Cardona and María Alfonso de Haro | 1322 – 1325 | County of Empúries (House of Folch de Cardona) | Unmarried | 25 August 1334 aged 26–27 | Grandson of Sybilla, daughter of Ponç IV. Also Viscount of Cardona. He was deposed by James II of Aragon, who replaced him with his own son. |
| Regency of Philip of Majorca (1324-1329) | | | | | | | Nephew of Sancho. Deposed by Peter the Ceremonious, in his attempt to reunite the domains of the Crown of Aragon. |
| James III | | 5 April 1315; Catania; Son of Ferdinand of Majorca and Isabelle of Sabran | 4 September 1324 – 1344 | County of Cerdanya-Roussillon (with Kingdom of Majorca) | Constance of Aragon; 24 September 1336; Perpignan two children Violante of Vilaragut; 10 November 1347 one child | 25 October 1349; Llucmajor aged 34 | Nephew of Sancho. Deposed by Peter the Ceremonious, in his attempt to reunite the domains of the Crown of Aragon. |
Cerdanya-Roussillon reabsorbed in Barcelona
| Peter I | | 1305; Barcelona; Eighth son of James II and Blanche of Anjou | 1325 – 1341 | County of Empúries | Joanna of Foix (d.1358); 12 May 1331; Castelló d'Empúries four children | 4 November 1381; Pisa aged 74–75 | Son of James II of Aragon, he was appointed as count of Empúries. Abdicated to his brother in 1341. |
| James I | | 1321; Zaragoza; Fourth son of Alphonse (future Alphonse III of Barcelona) and Teresa d'Entença | 20 October 1327 – 15 November 1347 | County of Urgell | Cecilia of Comminges; 1335 two children | 15 November 1347; Barcelona aged 25–26 | Son of Alfonso IV of Aragon (III as Count of Barcelona), he was appointed as count of Urgell. |
| Alphonse III the Kind; El Benigne | Alfons III | 2 November 1299; Naples; Son of James II and Blanche of Anjou | 2 November 1327 – 24 January 1336 | County of Barcelona (with Kingdom of Aragon) | Teresa d'Entença; 1314; Lerida seven children Eleanor of Castile; 5 February 1329; Tarazona two children | 27 January 1336; Barcelona aged 37 | |
| Peter III the Ceremonious; El Cerimoniós | Peter III | 5 October 1319; Balaguer; Son of Alphonse III and Teresa d'Entença | 24 January 1336 – 5 January 1387 | County of Barcelona (with Kingdom of Aragon) | Maria of Navarre; 25 July 1337; Zaragoza two children Leonor of Portugal; 14 or 15 November 1347; Barcelona no children Eleanor of Sicily; 27 August 1349; Valencia four children Sibila of Fortia; 11 October 1377; Barcelona three children | 5 January 1387; Barcelona aged 68 | |
| Ramon Berenguer | | 1308; Barcelona; Fifth son of James II and Blanche of Anjou | 1341 – 1364 | County of Empúries | Blanche of Taranto (1309-1337); 1327 two children María Alvárez de Xérica (1310-1364); 1338; Valencia one child | 1366 aged 57–58 | Abdicated of the county to his son, and died two years later. |
| Regency of Cecilia of Comminges (1347-1357) | | | | | | | |
| Peter II | | 1340; Son of James I and Cecilia of Comminges | 15 November 1347 – June 1408 | County of Urgell | Beatrice of Cardona; 22 August 1363 no children Margaret Palaiologina of Montferrat; 1375 eight children | June 1408; Balaguer aged 67–68 | |
| John I the Old; El Vell | | 1338; Son of Ramon Berenguer and María Alvárez de Xérica | 1364 – 1398 | County of Empúries | Blanche of Sicily; 3 August 1364 one child Joanna of Aragon; 19 June 1373 five children | 1398; Castellví de Rosanes aged 59–60 | During his reign, in 1386–1387, the county was briefly occupied by Barcelona-Aragon. |
| John the Hunter; El Caçador | John I | 27 December 1350; Perpignan; Son of Peter III and Eleanor of Sicily | 5 January 1387 – 19 May 1396 | County of Barcelona (with Kingdom of Aragon) | Martha of Armagnac; 24 June 1373; Barcelona five children Violant of Bar; 2 February 1380; Perpignan seven children | 19 May 1396; Foixà aged 46 | |
| Martin the Humanist l'Humà | Martí I | 1356; Girona; Son of Peter III and Eleanor of Sicily | 19 May 1396 – 31 May 1410 | County of Barcelona (with Kingdom of Aragon) | Maria de Luna; 13 June 1372; Barcelona four children Margaret of Prades; 17 September 1409; Barcelona no children | 31 May 1410; Barcelona aged 54 | Left no surviving heirs at the time of his death. Barcelona (and Aragon) entered in a period of convulsion that ended with the Compromise of Caspe (1412). |
| John II | | c.1375 First son of John I and Joanna of Aragon | 1398 –1401 | County of Empúries | Elfa of Cardona no children | 1401; Castelló d'Empúries aged 74–75 | Left no heirs, and was succeeded by his brother. |
| Peter II | | 1377; Second son of John I and Joanna of Aragon | 1401 –1402 | County of Empúries | 20 October 1399 no children | 1402 aged 23–24 | |
| Joana of Rocabertí | | 1358; Daughter of Philip Dalmau I of Rocabertí and Esclarmunda of Fenollet | 1402 | County of Empúries | 20 October 1399 no children | 1416 aged 57–58 | Widow of Peter II, ruled for a brief period before the county was annexed to Aragon. |
Empúries annexed to Barcelona
| James II the Unlucky; El Dissortat | | 1380; Balaguer; First son of Peter II and Margaret Palaiologina of Montferrat | June 1408 – 31 October 1413 | County of Urgell | Isabella of Aragon; 29 June 1407; Valencia five children | 1 June 1433; Xàtiva aged 52–23 | Pretender in the Aragonese War of Succession (1410–12), which caused him the loss of his properties. In 1413 Urgell was annexed to Aragon. |
Urgell annexed to the Crown of Aragon

=== Catalan Counties under House of Pallars/Bigorre ===
(Note: According to some authors, the county of Pallars (and by extension Ribagorça) aren't exactly part of the Catalan group of counties )

==== Partitions of the Catalan counties under Bigorre/Pallars dynasty domain ====
County of Pallars (872-1011)
| | | County of Ribagorça (920-1017) |
| County of Upper Pallars (Pallars Sobirà) (1011-1487) | | County of Ribagorça (920-1017) |
| County of Upper Pallars (Pallars Sobirà) (1011-1487) | County of Lower Pallars (Pallars Jussà) (1011-1192) | Annexed to the Taifa of Zaragoza (1017-1018), Pamplona (1018-1035) and Aragon (from 1035) |
| County of Upper Pallars (Pallars Sobirà) (1011-1487) | Annexed to Aragon (from 1192) | Annexed to the Taifa of Zaragoza (1017-1018), Pamplona (1018-1035) and Aragon (from 1035) |

==== Table of rulers ====
| Ruler | Born | Reign | Ruling part/ County | Consort | Death | Notes |
|---|---|---|---|---|---|---|
| Raymond I | c.860 (Probable) Son of Lop Donat, Count of Bigorre and Faquilo of Toulouse | 872 – 920 | County of Pallars | Guinigenta (d.c.865) five children A daughter of Mutarrif ibn Lop no children | 920 aged 59-60 | Possibly a descendant of the Ducal House of Gascony and the Comital House of Toulouse, Raymond was the first known member of the family to rule Pallars. |
| Bernard I | c.890? First son of Raymond I and Guinigenta | 920 – 955 | County of Ribagorça | Toda Galíndez of Aragon two children | 955 aged 64-65 | Children of Raymond I, divided their inheritance. The eldest, Bernard, received Ribagorça; the younger ones received Pallars and ruled it together. Bernard was probably the father of the countess Ava of Cerdanya. |
| Loup I | c.890? Second son of Raymond I and Guinigenta | 920 – 947 | County of Pallars | Goltregoda of Cerdanya five children | 947 aged 56-57 | Children of Raymond I, divided their inheritance. The eldest, Bernard, received Ribagorça; the younger ones received Pallars and ruled it together. Bernard was probably the father of the countess Ava of Cerdanya. |
| Isarn | c.890? Third son of Raymond I and Guinigenta | 920 – 948 | County of Pallars | Senegunda Adelaide two children (in total) | 948 aged 57-58 | Children of Raymond I, divided their inheritance. The eldest, Bernard, received Ribagorça; the younger ones received Pallars and ruled it together. Bernard was probably the father of the countess Ava of Cerdanya. |
| Raymond II | c.930 First son of Loup I and Goltregoda of Cerdanya | 948 – 992 | County of Pallars | Unmarried | 992 aged 61-62 | Children of Loup, Raymond, Borrell and Sunyer ruled jointly. After Borrell's death, his son Ermengol was associated to the co-rulership. After Sunyer's death in 1011, Ermengol was forced out of power by his cousins, sons of Sunyer, who split the county between them. |
| Borrell I | c.930 Second son of Loup I and Goltregoda of Cerdanya | 948 – 995 | County of Pallars | Ermengard of Rouergue six children | 995 aged 64-65 | Children of Loup, Raymond, Borrell and Sunyer ruled jointly. After Borrell's death, his son Ermengol was associated to the co-rulership. After Sunyer's death in 1011, Ermengol was forced out of power by his cousins, sons of Sunyer, who split the county between them. |
| Sunyer I | c.940 Third son of Loup I and Goltregoda of Cerdanya | 948 – 1011 | County of Pallars | Toda, Countess of Ribagorça five children | 1011 aged 61-62 | Children of Loup, Raymond, Borrell and Sunyer ruled jointly. After Borrell's death, his son Ermengol was associated to the co-rulership. After Sunyer's death in 1011, Ermengol was forced out of power by his cousins, sons of Sunyer, who split the county between them. |
| Ermengol | c.970 Son of Borrell I and Ermengard of Rouergue | 995 – 1011 | County of Pallars | Unmarried | 1030 aged 59-60? | Children of Loup, Raymond, Borrell and Sunyer ruled jointly. After Borrell's death, his son Ermengol was associated to the co-rulership. After Sunyer's death in 1011, Ermengol was forced out of power by his cousins, sons of Sunyer, who split the county between them. |
| Raymond II | c.920 Son of Bernard I and Toda Galíndez of Aragon | 955 – 970 | County of Ribagorça | Garsenda of Fézensac six children | 970 aged 49-50? | |
| Unifred | c.940 First son of Raymond II and Garsenda of Fézensac | 970 – 979 | County of Ribagorça | Sancha one child | 979 aged 38-39? | Left no heirs, and was succeeded by his brother. |
| Arnald | c.940 Second son of Raymond II and Garsenda of Fézensac | 979 – 990 | County of Ribagorça | Unmarried | 990 aged 49-50? | He also left no heirs, and was succeeded by his younger brother. |
| Isarn | c.950 Third son of Raymond II and Garsenda of Fézensac | 990 – 1003 | County of Ribagorça | Unmarried | 1003 aged 52-53? | Left no legitimate heirs, and was succeeded by his sister. |
| Toda | c.950 Daughter of Raymond II and Garsenda of Fézensac | 1003 – 1011 | County of Ribagorça | Sunyer I five children | 1019 aged 68-69? | Abdicated in 1011 to her nephew, illegitimate son of her brother Isarn. |
| Raymond III | c.995 First son of Sunyer I and Toda, Countess of Ribagorça | 1011 – 1047 | County of Lower Pallars | Mayor García of Castile c.1010 (annulled 1020) no children Ermesinde three children | 1047 aged 51-52 | Children of Sunyer, divided the county of Pallars between them. Through his wife Mayor, Raymond was involved in the Ribagorzan succession, as Mayor was a maternal granddaughter of Raymond II of Ribagorza. However, their divorce placed Raymond on Mayor's opposite side, and supporting the claim of Sancho III of Pamplona. |
| William II | c.995 Second son of Sunyer I and Toda, Countess of Ribagorça | 1011 – 1035 | County of Upper Pallars | Stephanie of Urgell (I) four children | 1035 aged 39-40 | Children of Sunyer, divided the county of Pallars between them. Through his wife Mayor, Raymond was involved in the Ribagorzan succession, as Mayor was a maternal granddaughter of Raymond II of Ribagorza. However, their divorce placed Raymond on Mayor's opposite side, and supporting the claim of Sancho III of Pamplona. |
| William Isarn | c.970 Illegitimate son of Isarn | 1011 – 1017 | County of Ribagorça | Unmarried | 1017 aged 46-47 | William ascended to power, helped by her aunt Toda (who wanted to avoid her husband's intrusion in Ribagorza's affairs) and his cousin, count Sancho García of Castile. William divided the county with Mayor, sister of Sancho García (as both were children of Ava, Toda's sister). William's death caused a succession crisis in the county. Mayor García's part was contested by Pamplona, as Sancho III of Pamplona was married to Mayor's heir, Muniadona of Castile. Mayor was expelled in 1025, and her part inherited by the Kingdom of Pamplona and then by the Kingdom of Aragon. William's part, after a brief annexation by the taifa of Zaragoza, also joined Pamplona. |
| Mayor García of Castile | c.970 Daughter of García Fernández, Count of Castile and Ava of Ribagorça | 1011 – 1025 | County of Ribagorça | Raymond III, Count of Lower Pallars c.1010 (annulled 1020) no children | 1035 aged 46-47 | |
Ribagorça annexed to the Taifa of Zaragoza (1017-1018), the Kingdom of Pamplona (1018/1025-1035), and then inherited by the Kingdom of Aragon
| Bernard II | c.1020 First son of William II and Stephanie of Urgell (I) | 1035 – 1049 | County of Upper Pallars | Unmarried | 1049 aged 28-29 | Left no heirs and was succeeded by his brother. |
| Raymond IV | c.1030 Son of Raymond III and Ermesinde | 1047 – 1098 | County of Lower Pallars | Valença de Tost; 1056 four children | 1098 aged 67-68 | |
| Artald I | c.1020 Second son of William II and Stephanie of Urgell (I) | 1049 – 1081 | County of Upper Pallars | Constance (d.bef.1058); 1050 three children Lucie of La Marche; 1058 one child | 1081 aged 60-61 | |
| Artald II | c.1050 Son of Artald I and Constance | 1081 – 1124 | County of Upper Pallars | Eslonza Martínez c.1085 one child | 1124 aged 73-74? | |
| Arnaud Raymond | c.1060 First son of Raymond IV and Valença de Tost | 1098 – 1111 | County of Lower Pallars | Almodis of Cerdanya two children Adelaide one child | 1111 aged 50-51 | Elder children of Raymond IV, ruled jointly. |
| Peter Raymond | c.1060 Second son of Raymond IV and Valença de Tost | 1098 – 1113 | County of Lower Pallars | Unmarried | 1113 aged 52-53 | Elder children of Raymond IV, ruled jointly. |
| Bernard Raymond | c.1070 Third son of Raymond IV and Valença de Tost | 1113 – 1126 | County of Lower Pallars | Toda one child | 1126 aged 53-54 | Younger brother of the predecessors. |
| Artald III | c.1090 Son of Artaud II and Eslonza Martínez | 1124 – 1167 | County of Upper Pallars | Agnes; 1130 two children Ximena Pérez d'Alagón; 1135 one child | 1167 aged 76-77? | His child from his second wife, Palacín, founded a new branch of the family, which continued the maternal surname Alagón . |
| Arnaud Miro | 1113; Son of Arnaud Raymond and Almodis of Cerdanya | 1126 – 1174 | County of Lower Pallars | Stephanie of Urgell (II) (annulled) no children Oria d'Entença c.1145 two children | 1174 aged 60-61 | Son of Arnald Raymond. |
| Artald IV | 1132; Son of Artald III and Agnes | 1167 – 1182 | County of Upper Pallars | Guillema c.1170 two children | 1182 aged 49-50 | |
| Raymond V | c.1150 Son of Arnaud Miro and Oria d'Entença | 1174 – September 1177 | County of Lower Pallars | Anglesa of Cardona (d.1177); 1167 one child | September 1177 aged 26-27 | |
| Regency of Alphonse II of Aragon (1178-c.1180). | | | | | | Left no children. She nominated her grandfather's cousin Douce as her heir. |
| Valença | 1167; Daughter of Raymond V and Anglesa of Cardona | September 1177 – 1182 | County of Lower Pallars | Unmarried | 1182 aged 14-15 | Left no children. She nominated her grandfather's cousin Douce as her heir. |
| Regency of Guillema (1182-c.1185) | | | | | | Left no children, and was succeeded by his sister. |
| Bernard III | 1170; Son of Artald IV and Guillema | 1182 – 1199 | County of Upper Pallars | Unmarried | 1199 aged 28-29 | Left no children, and was succeeded by his sister. |
| Douce | c.1110 Daughter of Bernard Raymond and Toda | 1182 – 1192 | County of Lower Pallars | Unmarried | 1198 aged 87-88? | Daughter of Bernard Raymond, and the last living member of the Lower Pallars branch. In 1192 she donated the county to the County of Barcelona. |
Lower Pallars annexed to the County of Barcelona
| Guillema | 1180; Daughter of Artald IV and Guillema | 1199 – 1229 | County of Upper Pallars | Guilhem d'Erill no children Roger I 1216 no children | 1250; Vallbona de les Monges aged 69-70 | Sister of Bernard. Associated her husband to the county in 1216. In 1229, she retired to a monastic life, and left her husband the entire county. As they didn't have children, the Pallars dynasty was deemed extinct after Guillema's death. |

==== Successor families in the County of Upper Pallars ====
In 1229, Countess Guillema of Upper Pallars sold her domains to her husband Roger I (grandson of Bernard III, Count of Comminges), with whom she had no children. The rights were transmitted to the children of Roger's other marriage, and as so with no close family connection with the Pallarese dynasty. However, if the Bigorre family and the Comminges family share an ancestor in the Ducal House of Gascony, they may have a distant relation.

In 1327, after the death of countess Sybilla, her inheritance went to her children, from the Mataplana family, which was dispossessed of the county in 1491.

| Ruler | Born | Reign | Consort | Death | Notes |
|---|---|---|---|---|---|
House of Comminges (1216-1327)
| Roger I | 1182; Couserans; Son of Roger II, Viscount of Couserans and Sybille of Foix | 1216 – 1236 | Cecilia of Forcalquier c.1200 two children Guillema; 1216 no children | 1240 aged 61-62 | Also Viscount of Couserans. Had no children from his second wife, but she left him the county in 1229. He abdicated to his son (from his first wife) in 1236. |
| Roger II | c.1230 Son of Roger I and Sybille of Saga | 1236 – 1256 | Sybilla of Berga; 1234 two children | 1256 aged 25-26 | |
| Arnald Roger I | 1236; First son of Roger II and Sybilla of Berga | 1256 – 1288 | Sancha of Villamur no children Lascara Lascaris of Ventimglia; 1281 three children | 1288 aged 51-52 | |
| Raymond Roger I | c.1240 Second son of Roger II and Sybilla of Berga | 1288 – 1295 | Blanca de Bellera no children | 1295 aged 54-55 | |
| Sybilla | 1282; Daughter of Arnald Roger I and Lascara Lascaris of Ventimglia | 1295 – 1327 | Hug VII, Lord of Mataplana; 1297 seven children | 1327 aged 44-45 | Through marriage, the county passed to the Catalan Mataplana family. |
Mataplana family (1327-1487)
| Arnald Roger II | 1290; First son of Hug VII de Mataplana and Sybilla | 1327 – 1343 | Alamanda of Rocabertí (d.1320/21); 1320 no children Eleanor of Comminges; 1340 no children | 1343 aged 52-53 | |
| Raymond Roger II | 1305; Second son of Hug VII de Mataplana and Sybilla | 1327 – 1343 | Sybilla of Cardona; 1322 six children | 1350 aged 44-45 | |
| Hugh Roger I | 1322; Son of Raymond Roger II and Sybilla | 1350 – 1366 | Geralda de Cruïlles; 1342 four children | 1366 aged 44-45 | |
| Arnald Roger III | 1347; First son of Hugh Roger I and Geralda de Cruïlles | 1366 – 1369 | Beatrice of Requesens; 1363 no children | 1369 aged 21-22 | |
| Hugh Roger II | 1350; Second son of Hugh Roger I and Geralda de Cruïlles | 1369 – 1416 | Blanche of Foix-Castelbon; 1368 eight children | 1416 aged 75-76 | |
| Roger Bernard | 1370; Son of Hugh Roger II and Blanche of Foix-Castelbon | 1416 – 1424 | Beatrice of Cardona; 1390 two children | 1424 aged 53-54 | |
| Arnald Roger IV | 1401; Son of Roger Bernard and Beatrice of Cardona | 1424 – 1451 | Joana of Cardona; 1421 four children | 1451 aged 49-50 | |
| Hugh Roger III of Pallars Sobirà | 1430; Son of Arnald Roger IV and Joana of Cardona | 1451 – 1491 | Caterina Albert; 1478 two children | 26 November 1508; Xàtiva aged 77-78? | After a siege of Ferdinand II of Aragon, led by John Ramon III, Count of Cardona, the county eventually capitulated to Aragonese domain in 1491. |
Upper Pallars annexed to the Aragonese House of Trastámara

== The House of Trastámara and successors ==
=== House of Trastámara (1412-1516) and the Catalan Civil War (1462-1472) ===
Martin died without legitimate descendants (interregnum 31 May 1410 – 24 June 1412). By the Compromise of Caspe of 1412 the County of Barcelona and the rest of the dominions of the Crown of Aragon passed to a branch of the House of Trastamara.

| Name | Portrait | Reign | Notes |
|---|---|---|---|
| Ferdinand I the Honest | | 3 September 1412 – 2 April 1416 | He was the nephew of Martin I and the first Count of Barcelona of the House of Trastámara. |
| Alphonse IV the Magnanimous | | 2 April 1416 – 27 June 1458 | He was the son of Ferdinand I. |
| John II the Faithless or the Just | | 27 June 1458 – 1462 | He was the brother of Alphonse IV. The Catalans confronted him during the Catalan Civil War and in 1462 transferred the title of count to another Trastamara House pretender |
During the Catalan Civil War, a war between the Catalan government and the king|John II, the Catalan authorities transferred the title of Count of Barcelona to a succession of 3 foreign sovereigns.
| Henry I the Impotent (House of Trastámara) | | 1462 - 1463 | He was the Ferdinand I grandson and thus also from the Trastámara House. |
| Peter IV of Portugal (House of Aviz) | | 1463 – 1466 | He was the greatgrandson of Peter III. |
| René I (House of Valois-Anjou) | | 1466 – 1472 | He was the grandson of John the Hunter. He was also the Count of Provence. |
After the Catalan Civil War, the House of Trastámara was restituted as tenants of the Count of Barcelona title and thus sovereigns of the Principality of Catalonia.
| John II the Faithless or the Just | | 1472 – 20 January 1479 | He was the brother of Alphonse IV. The Catalans confronted him during the Catalan Civil War and afterward reinstated him as Count of Barcelona. |
| Ferdinand II | | 20 January 1479 – 23 January 1516 | He was the son of John II. |
| Joanna | | 23 January 1516 – 12 April 1555 | She was the daughter of Ferdinand II. Her rule was nominal as it was his son Charles who co-ruler. |

=== The Houses of Habsburg and Bourbon 1516-1808 ===
| Name | Portrait | Reign | Notes |
|---|---|---|---|
| Charles I (emperor) | | 14 March 1516 – 12 April 1555 (as regent); 12 April 1555 – 16 January 1556 (as sole ruler) | He was the son of Queen Joanna and Philip I of Castile. Till the death of her mother, in 1555, he was regent but the de facto ruler. From 155 to 1556, he was the sole ruler. As he was not the Count (till her mother died) and had good relations with Catalan authorities, they awarded him the title of Prince of Catalonia. |
| Philip I | | 16 January 1556 – 13 September 1598 | He was the son of Charles I. |
| Philip II | | 13 September 1598 – 31 March 1621 | He was the son of Philip I. |
| Philip III | | 31 March 1621 – 1641 | He was the son of Philip II. He wanted to reduce the Catalan sovereignties, and the Catalan authorities confronted him during the Reapers' War. The title of Count of Barcelona was transferred by the Catalan Courts to the House of Bourbon in France. |
| Louis I (Louis XIII of France); 27 September 1601 – 14 May 1643 | | 1641–1643 | During the Reapers' War, the States-General (Braços Generals) of the Principality of Catalonia on 21 January 1641 declared the French king Louis XIII Count of Barcelona as Louis I. |
| Louis II (Louis XIV of France); 5 September 1638 – 1 September 1715 | | 1643–1652 and 1697 | He inherits the title of Count of Barcelona from his father during the Reapers' War. In 1652 he renounces the title in favor of Philip III in exchange for the Roussillon. |
| Philip III | | 1641 – 17 September 1665 | He was the son of Philip II. He was reinstated as Count of Barcelona. |
| Charles II | | 17 September 1665 – 1 November 1700 | He was the son of Philip III. In 1697 the Duke of Vendôme briefly re-conquers Catalan capital city of Barcelona, and Louis XIV was reinstated as Count of Barcelona for some months. On January 9, 1698, Catalonia is returned to Charles II after signing the Treaty of Rijswijk. |
| Philip IV | | 1700 – 1705 | Philip was a great-grandson of Philip III, and Charles was a cousin of the same king. Charles II's testament in favor of the former destabilized Western Europe because it meant too much power for the Kingdom of France. The rest of the European powers tried to impose another pretender to the Crown of Spain: the Archduke Charles of Austria. The Catalans were caught in the middle of this major conflict: the Spanish Succession War. They initially supported Philip but afterward shifted their allegiance towards Archduke Charles, who was committed to maintaining the composite monarchy system and thus respect the Catalan Constitutions. In 1714, Philip owned the Spanish possessions of the Habsburgs. |
| Charles III | | 1705 – 1714 | |

=== House of Bourbon (Spanish branch) 1714-1808 ===
In 1714, Catalonia, which had backed the Habsburg pretender to the Spanish crown Archduke Charles of Austria, was defeated in the War of the Spanish Succession by the Bourbon forces supporting Philip of Anjou's claim to the Spanish crown. Through the Nueva Planta decrees, the new Bourbon king of Spain Philip V abolished the Catalan Constitutions and merged the Crown of Aragon and the Crown of Castile to form the Kingdom of Spain. The Principality of Catalonia became another province and thus the title of the Count of Barcelona was emptied of real political power.

Since then, the numbering of the Counts of Barcelona, which had followed that of the Crown of Aragon, followed that of the former Crown of Castille. That is the reason why Philip of Anjou was called by the Catalan authorities 'Felip IV' in 1702 but called himself 'Felipe V' when he seized the title of the Count of Barcelona in 1714, after defeating the Habsburg pretender and his Catalan backers.

=== House of Bonaparte 1808-1813 ===
In 1808 Charles IV and his son Ferdinand resign from their Crown of Spain titles and transfer them to Emperor Napoleon, who kept for himself the title of Count of Barcelona. By 1812, once he had full military control over the Principality of Catalonia, he separated it from the Crown of Spain and annexed it to the French Empire.

| Name | Portrait | Reign | Notes |
|---|---|---|---|
| Napoleon I, Emperor | | 1808–1813 | Napoleon annexed Catalonia to the French Empire as 4 new departments. In 1813, after much fighting, it was returned to Spain. |

=== House of Bourbon (Reannexation to Spain) 1813-1931; 1975-present day ===
After the Napoleonic Wars, Barcelona returned to Spanish domain. During the 2nd Spanish Republic and Francoist Dictatorship the Bourbons remained in exile and retained their dynastic titles, including 'Count of Barcelona'. Although on 26 July 1947, Spain was declared a kingdom, no monarch was designated until 1969, when Franco established Juan Carlos of Bourbon as his official heir-apparent. With the death of Franco on 20 November 1975, Juan Carlos became the King of Spain.

| Name | Portrait | Reign | Notes |
|---|---|---|---|
| John III (Juan III) | | 1977–1993 | claimed the title from 1941; officially granted by his son Juan Carlos I as a courtesy in exchange for renouncing his claim to the Spanish throne |

== Sources ==
- Lewis, Archibald Ross (1965), The Development of Southern French and Catalan Society, 718–1050, Austin: University of Texas Press
