= House of Barcelona =

Catalan noble family

- Parent house: Bellonids
- Country: West Francia; Holy Roman Empire; Kingdom of Burgundy-Arles; County of Barcelona; Principality of Catalonia; Kingdom of Aragon; Crown of Aragon; Kingdom of Sicily; Kingdom of Majorca; Kingdom of Valencia
- Founder: Wilfred the Hairy
- Final ruler: Martin of Aragon
- Titles: King of Aragon; King of Valencia; King of Majorca; King of Sicily; King of Sardinia and Corsica; Duke of Athens; Duke of Neopatria; Count of Urgell; Count of Barcelona; Count of Girona; Count of Ausona; Count of Besalú; Count of Provence; Count of Forcalquier; Count of Cerdagne; Lord of Montpellier
- Dissolution: 1438 (male); 1445 (female)
- Deposition: 1410

The House of Barcelona was a medieval dynasty that ruled the County of Barcelona continuously from 878 and the Crown of Aragon from 1137 (as kings from 1162) until 1410. They descend from the Bellonids, the descendants of Wilfred the Hairy. They inherited most of the Catalan counties by the thirteenth century and established a territorial Principality of Catalonia, uniting it with the Kingdom of Aragon through marriage and conquering numerous other lands and kingdoms until the death of the last legitimate male of the main branch, Martin the Humanist, in 1410. Cadet branches of the house continued to rule Urgell (since 992) and Gandia. Cadet branches of the dynasty had also ruled Ausona intermittently from 878 until 1111, Provence from 1112 to 1245, and Sicily from 1282 to 1409. By the Compromise of Caspe of 1412 the Crown of Aragon passed to a branch of the House of Trastámara, descended from the infanta Eleanor of the house of Barcelona.

== Titles of the House of Barcelona and date of acquisition ==
This list does not include titles held by the early Bellonids that did not remain with the family during the tenth century.

- Count of Urgell (870–992)
- Count of Barcelona (878–1410)
- Count of Girona (878–1410)
- Count of Ausona (1111–1410)
- Count of Besalú (1111–1410), inherited from another branch of the family
- Count of Provence (1112–1245)
- Count of Berga (1118–1410)
- Count of Cerdagne (1118–1410), inherited from another branch of the family
- Count of Conflent (1118–1410)
- Prince of Aragon (1137–1162)
- King of Aragon (1162–1410)
- Count of Roussillon (1172–1410)
- Count of Pallars Jussà (1192–1410)
- Lord of Montpellier (1204–1249)
- King of Valencia (1238–1410)
- King of Majorca (1276–1410)
- King of Sicily (1282–1410)
- King of Sardinia and Corsica (1297–1410)
- Duke of Athens (1312–1388)
- Count of Urgell (1314–1413)
- Duke of Neopatria (1319–1390)

== Family tree of the House of Barcelona ==
Sunifred I count of Barcelona, Cerdanya, Besalú, Urgell, Conflent; HOUSE OF BARCELONA	Ermesende (daughter of Bello count of Carcassonne); HOUSE OF BELLO
Wilfred I "the Hairy" count of Barcelona	Radulf count of Besalú	Miro I count of Roussillon, Conflent
Wifred II Borrel I count of Barcelona	Sunyer count of Barcelona	Sunifred II count of Urgell	Miró II count of Cerdanya, Besalú; BRANCH OF CERDANYA
Borrell II count of Barcelona	Miro count of Barcelona	Sunifred II count of Cerdanya	Wifred II count of Besalú	Miro III count of Cerdania, Besalú	Oliba Cabreta count of Cerdanya, Besalú
Ramon Borrell count of Barcelona	Ermengol I count of Urgell; BRANCH OF URGELL	Bernard I count of Besalú	Wifred II count of Cerdania	Oliba abbot, bishop of Bic
Berenguer Ramon I count of Barcelona	Ermengol II count of Urgell	Bernard I count of Berga	Berengar count of Berga
Ramon Berenguer I count of Barcelona	Ermengol III count of Urgell
Peter Raymundi heir apparent	Ramon Berenguer II count of Barcelona	Berenguer Ramond II count of Barcelona	Gerberga countess of Provence; HOUSE OF BOSO	Ermengol IV count of Urgell
Ramon Berenguer III count of Barcelona, I of Provence	Doulce I countess of Provence	Ermengol V count of Urgell	William III count of Forcalquier; BRANCH OF FORCALQUIER
Ramon Berenguer IV count of Barcelona	Petronilla queen of Aragon; HOUSE OF JIMENEZ	Berenger Raymond count of Provence	Ermengol VI count of Urgell	Bertrand I count of Forcalquier
Peter heir apparent	Alfonso II king of Aragon, I count of Provence	Ramon Berenguer III count of Provence	Sancho count of Provence	Ramon Berenguer II count of Provence	Ermengol VII count of Urgell	Bertrand II count of Forcalquier	William IV count of Forcalquier
Eudokia Komnene	Nuño Sánchez count of Russillon, Cerdagne	Douce II countess of Provence	Ermengol VIII count of Urgell	Garcenda heiress
Maria of Montpellier	Peter II king of Aragon	Alfonso II count of Provence	Garcenda de Sabran countess of Forcalquier
James I king of Aragon	Ramon Berenguer IV count of Provence, Forcalquier
Peter III king of Aragon	Constance of Hohenstaufen queen of Sicily	Beatrice countess of Provence, Forcalquier	Charles I king of Sicily	James II king of Majorca; BRANCH OF MAJORCA
Alfonso III king of Aragon	James II king of Aragon, king of Sicily	Frederick II king of Sicily; BRANCH OF SICILY	James heir apparent, monk	Sancho king of Majorca	Ferdinand prince	Philip regent of Majorca
James heir apparent, monk	Alfonso IV king of Aragon	John patriarch of Alexandria	Peter II king of Sicily	(illeg.) Orlando governor of Palermo	(illeg.) Alfonso Fadrique vicar of Athens	Manfred duke of Athens	William II duke of Athens	John duke of Athens	(illeg.) Sancho	James III king of Majorca
Peter IV king of Aragon	James I count of Urgell	Louis king of Sicily	Frederick III king of Sicily duke of Athens	Peter Fadrique count of Salona	James Fadrique count of Salona	Boniface Fadrique lord of Aegina	John Fadrique lord of Salamina	Frederick I duke of Athens	Viguerra chancellor of Sicily	John II Palaiologos marquess of Montferrat	Isabella queen of Majorca	James IV king of Majorca
John I king of Aragon	Eleanor ∞ John I of Trastámara king of Castile	Martin king of Aragon	Peter II count of Urgell	Margaret Palaiologina	Louis Fadrique count of Salona	Elena Kantakouzene	Bartolomeo count of Cammarata	Peter II count of Urgell	Margaret Palaiologina
Henry III king of Castile	Ferdinand I king of Aragon	Martin I of Sicily king of Sicily	Maria queen of Sicily, duchess of Athens
Frederick count of Luna	James II count of Urgell

== See also ==
- Royal House of Aragon

House of Barcelona
Preceded by (founder)	Ruling House of Barcelona; 878 - 1164	Succeeded by Itself as Ruling House of the Crown of Aragon
Preceded by Merged with the House of Aragon	Ruling House of Aragon, Catalonia, Valencia, Majorca, Sardinia, Sicily; 1164 - 1410	Succeeded by House of Trastámara
