= Guinard =

Guinard may refer to:

- Girard I of Roussillon, count of Roussillon from 1102 to 1113
- Manuel Guinard (born 1995), French tennis player
