= Berenguer Ramon I =

Count of Barcelona, Girona and Ausona (1005-1035) (r.1018-1035)

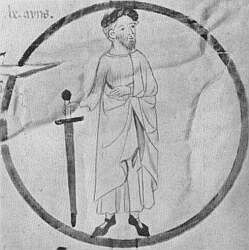
- Born: c. 1005
- Died: 26 May 1035; Barcelona
- Buried: Santa Maria de Ripoll
- Noble family: House of Barcelona
- Spouses: Sancha Sánchez; Guisla de Lluçà
- Issue: Ramon Berenguer I, Count of Barcelona; Sancho Berenguer; Guillem [William] Berenguer; Bernat [Bernard] Berenguer
- Father: Ramon Borrell, Count of Barcelona
- Mother: Ermesinde of Carcassonne

Berenguer Ramon I (c. 1005 – 26 May 1035), called the Crooked or the Hunchback (in Latin curvus; in Catalan el Corbat; in Spanish el Corvado or el Curvo), was the count of Barcelona, Girona, and Ausona from 1018 to his death.

== Life ==
He was the son of Ramon Borrell, count of Barcelona, Girona, and Ausona, and his wife, Ermesinde of Carcassonne. He accepted the suzerainty of Sancho the Great of Navarre.

Berenguer Ramon as a historical figure is enigmatic, shrouded in incomprehensible contradictions and ambiguities. First, he was a man of peace, and peace ruled throughout his reign. He pacified his neighbours as well, bringing to heel the count of Urgell, Ermengol II. He reestablished amicable relations with Count Hugh I of Empúries, and maintained them with Counts William I of Besalú and Wilfred II of Cerdanya. He was a son of the church who maintained relations with the papacy and went on a pilgrimage to Rome in 1032. On many occasions he travelled to Zaragoza and Navarre to discuss with Sancho III the Great, King of Navarre their mutual stance against the counts of Toulouse. His confidantes and councillors were the Abbot Oliva, the judge Ponç Bofill, Gombau de Besora, and Pere de Carcassona and Deudado of Barcelona. In 1025, he decreed that the proprietors of entails (men holding land in fee tail) were free from taxation.

On the other hand, the government of Berenguer Ramon I marks the beginning of the decline of the comital power. At the death of his father in 1018, Berenguer Ramon was a minor and his mother Ermesinde served as regent until 1023. But even when he attained his majority, his mother would not relinquish her power and ruled with him. According to some chroniclers, Berenguer's character left some things to be desired. He is described as weak and indecisive. Moreover, his policy of peace with the Moors was a bone of contention with the noblesse, who saw war with the Muslims as a way of obtaining glory, wealth, and possibly even salvation. This led some nobles to act independently of the count's wishes. Ermesinde, on the other hand, was energetic and decisive, intent on imposing the authority of Barcelona on the baronage. But, as a woman, her capability to exercise control of the military was greatly impeded and organizing a raid or expedition to satisfy the wants of the aristocracy was virtually impossible.

The weakening of comital authority became evident shortly before his death in 1035, when Ermesinde successfully partitioned his patrimony among his sons. Berenguer Ramon died on 26 May 1035 and was buried in Santa Maria de Ripoll.

== Marriages and children ==
In 1021, Berenguer married Sancha of Castile, daughter of Sancho Garcés, Count of Castile. By her he had two sons:

- Ramon Berenguer (born 1023), who received the county of Girona (with his mother) and the county of Barcelona as far as the river Llobregat.
- Sanç (Sancho) Berenguer (birth date unknown), who received the frontier march from the Llobregat to the al-Andalus, which constituted the new county of Penedès with its capital in Olèrdola. Sometime between 1041 and 1049, Sanç swore fealty to his elder brother. Then, on 9 June 1050, he ceded his inheritance to Ramon, who in return granted him some lands and men as a fief. Sanç then entered the church, first as a monk at Saint-Pons-de-Thomières and then as the prior of Sant Benet de Bages, before it became an abbey.

In 1027, Berenguer married as his second wife Guisla de Lluçà, with whom he had two more sons;

- Guillem (William) Berenguer (born 1028), who received the county of Osona (comitatum Ausonensem), with his mother, and the county of Manresa. He renounced his county on 4 December 1054, allowing his brother Ramon to restore their patrimony.
- Bernat [Bernard] Berenguer (born 1029)

Two daughters have also been speculatively assigned to this couple: Clemencia, who married Ermengol III of Urgell, and the wife, name unknown, of Henry of Burgundy.

Berenguer Ramon I House of Barcelona Born: 1005 Died: 26 May 1035
Preceded by Raymond Borrel	Count of Barcelona; 1018–1035	Succeeded by Ramon Berenguer I
