= Hugh II of Empúries =

Hugh II (Catalan: Hug II) (c. 1035 – 1116) was the Count of Empúries from 1078 until his death. He was the eldest son of Ponç I and Adelaida de Besalú, and succeeded his father in Empúries while his brother, Berenguer, was given the Viscounty of Peralada.

In politics he was on good terms with the other Catalan princes. In 1082, he fought in a Catalan coalition at the Battle of Almenar. In 1085, he made an alliance of mutual self-defence with his neighbour, Giselbert II of Roussillon. In 1113–15, he and Ramon Berenguer III, Count of Barcelona, took part in an expedition against the Balearics. He was described by the anonymous author of the Liber maiolichinus as Catalanicus heros (a Catalan hero).

Hugh was involved in several disputes with the diocese of Girona, first with its canons and then with its bishop, Berenguer Guifré, over the tithes collected by the parish church of Santa Maria de Castelló. He made donations to the monastery of Sant Pere de Rodes and made pilgrimages to Santiago de Compostela and the Holy Sepulchre at Jerusalem.

Hugh was married to Sancha, daughter of Ermengol IV of Urgell, which whom he had one child, the heir Ponç II.

Preceded by Ponç I	Count of Empúries; 1078–1116	Succeeded by Ponç II
