= Ermesinde of Carcassonne =

Countess consort of Barcelona, Girona and Osona (c.975/8-1058)

- Born: Ermessenda de Carcassona c. 975/8
- Died: 1 March 1058; Sant Quirze de Besora, County of Ausona
- Noble family: House of Comminges
- Spouse: Ramon Borrell
- Issue Detail: Berenguer Ramon I
- Father: Roger I of Carcassonne
- Mother: Adelaide of Rouergue

Ermesinde of Carcassonne (c. 975/8 – 1 March 1058) was Countess consort of Barcelona, Girona and Osona by marriage to Ramon Borrell, Count of Barcelona. She served as regent in these counties during the minority of her son Berenguer Ramon from 1018 until 1023, and during the minority of her grandson Ramon Berenguer I, Count of Barcelona between 1035 and 1044.

== Life ==
Ermesinde of Carcassonne was the daughter of Roger I of Carcassonne. She married Ramon Borrell, Count of Barcelona.

While he lived she was politically active and presided over assemblies and tribunals. After his death in 1018 she became regent for her son Berenguer Ramon I until 1023. After this, she continued to wield power. Her patronage and close relationship with the Catholic Church helped her build an influential entourage of church officials who helped her retain power throughout her life. In contrast to her son, she favored war with the Muslim powers to the South, partly because of the discontent of the nobles at his policy of peace.

When he died in 1035, she became regent for her grandson until he was declared to be of age in 1044.

== Marriage and children ==
In 991, Ermesinde married Ramon Borrell, Count of Barcelona, with whom she had:

- Borrell Ramon
- Berenguer Ramon (c. 1006)
- (Possibly) Etienette (Stephanie), who married firstly, Roger I of Tosny, and secondly, García Sánchez III of Pamplona.

== Sources ==
- Graham-Leigh, Elaine (2005). The Southern French Nobility and the Albigensian Crusade. The Boydell Press.
- Grifoll, Isabel (2017). "The Culture(Ninth-Twelfth Centuries):Clerics and Troubadours". In Sabaté, Flocel (ed.). The Crown of Aragon: A Singular Mediterranean Empire. Brill.
