= Joanna of Aragon, Countess of Empúries =

Countess consort of Empúries from 1373 to c.1785

Joanna of Aragon

Countess consort of Empúries
- Tenure: 1373-1385
- Born: 7 November 1344; Barcelona, Principality of Catalonia
- Died: 1385 (aged 40–41); Castelló d'Empúries, Empúries, Catalonia
- Burial: Poblet Monastery
- Spouse: John I, Count of Empúries
- Issue: John II, Count of Empúries; Peter, Count of Empúries
- House: Barcelona
- Father: Peter IV of Aragon
- Mother: Maria of Navarre

Joanna of Aragon (7 November 1344, Barcelona - 1385, Castelló d'Empúries) was a Catalan noblewoman, the second child of Peter IV of Aragon and his first wife Maria of Navarre. She was an Infanta of Aragon by birth and Countess of Empúries by her marriage. She was a member of the House of Barcelona.

== Marriage ==
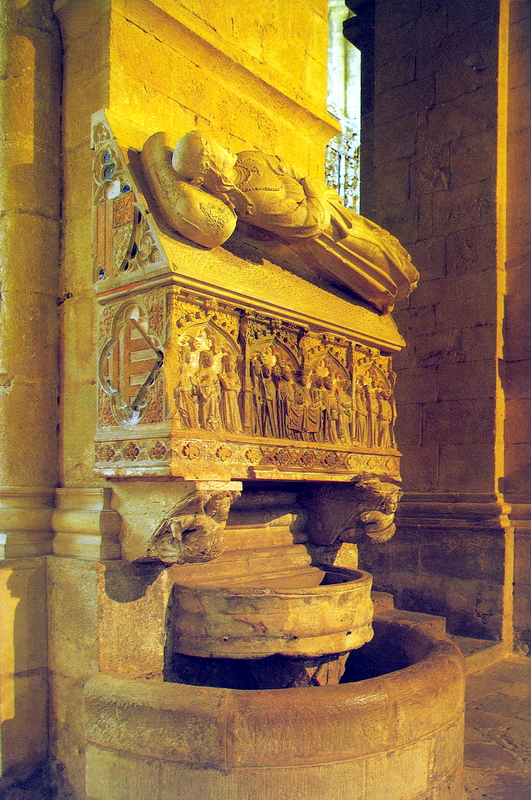
The tomb of Joanna

On the 19 June 1373, Joanna married John I, Count of Empúries. This was his second marriage after the death of his first wife Blanche of Sicily. Joanna was 29 at the time of the marriage, she was considered an older bride.

Many members of her family showed dislike to her father's fourth wife Queen Sibila, due to her low ranking birth and her family's interference at court. Joanna's husband John came into conflict with Sibila, and then rebelled against Joanna's father. The marriage of Peter and Sibila also led to a strain between himself and his three surviving children: Joanna, John and Martin.

Joanna and John were married for twelve years, in this time they had two sons:

1. John (1375–1401), succeeded his father as Count of Empúries
2. Peter (d.1402), succeeded his brother, however only reigned for a year.

Joanna died aged forty or forty-one in 1385. Her husband died thirteen years later in 1398. She is buried at Poblet Monastery.

== Ancestors ==
Ancestors of Joanna of Aragon, Countess of Empúries

8. James II of Aragon
4. Alfonso IV of Aragon
9. Blanche of Anjou
2. Peter IV of Aragon
10. Gombau d'Entença
5. Teresa d'Entença
11. Constança d'Antillón
1. Joanna of Aragon
12. Louis of Évreux
6. Philip III of Navarre
13. Margaret of Artois
3. Maria of Navarre
14. Louis X of France
7. Joan II of Navarre
15. Margaret of Burgundy
