= William IV of Forcalquier =

French noble (1130–1208)

William IV, Count of Forcalquier (French: Guillaume IV d'Urgell ou Guillaume II de Forcalquier; 1130–1208) was the son of Bertrand I, Count of Forcalquier and Josserande de la Flotte. William married Adelaide de Beziers, daughter of Saura de Carcassonne and Raimond Trencavel of Beziers Viscount of Beziers, of Agde, of Albi, of Carcassonne, and of Razès.

He co-ruled the county with his brother Bertrand II, who died leaving him as sole count.

William's daughter Garsenda, who married Rainou of Sabran, Lord of Caylar and Ansouis, predeceased him so his granddaughter of the same name inherited his county at the age of 13. William signed the Treaty of Aix in July 1193, with Alfonso II, who was in line to become Count of Provence, betrothing her to himself in marriage.

== Bibliography ==
- Varano, Mariacristina (2011). Espace religieux et espace politique en pays provençal au Moyen Âge (PDF) (in French). L'exemple de Forcalquier et de sa région, thèse soutenue à l'université d'Aix-Marseille I.
