= Ramon Borrell =

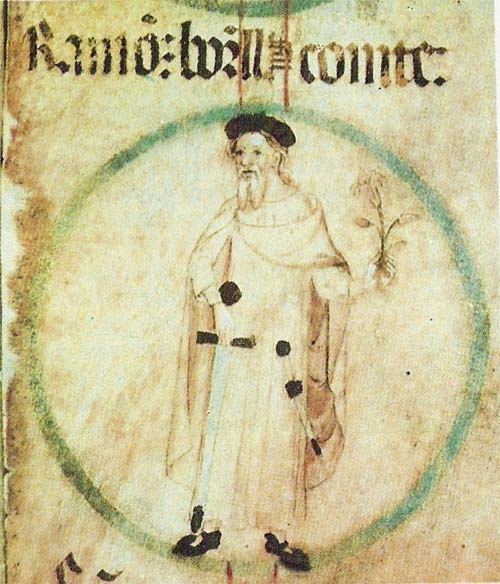
- Ramon Borrell of Barcelona
- Born: 972
- Died: 1017
- Buried: Barcelona Cathedral
- Noble family: House of Barcelona
- Spouse: Ermesinde of Carcassonne
- Issue: Borrell Ramon; Berenguer Ramon I, Count of Barcelona; Adelaide (or Godehildis) Ramon
- Father: Borrell II of Barcelona
- Mother: Letgarda de Rouergue

Ramon Borrell (Catalan: Ramon Borrell, Spanish: Ramón Borrell; 972–1017) was count of Barcelona, Girona and Ausona from 992. He was the son of Borrell II of Barcelona and Letgarda of Rouergue, and was associated with his father in ruling the counties from 988.

== Biography ==
Between 1000 and 1002 Ramon had to deal with a number of incursions by Almanzor. However, Almanzor died in 1002, and seeing an opportunity Ramon counter-attacked in 1003 leading an expedition to Lleida. This prompted a new raid on the county of Barcelona by Almanzor's son, Abd al-Malik al-Muzaffar. This was defeated by an alliance of Christian forces at the Battle of Torà. Ramon was also present at the Battle of Albesa shortly thereafter.

In 1010, with the Cordoban Caliphate crumbling into civil war, Ramon saw another opportunity. He organised a campaign, assisted by the bishop of Vic and Sal·la, bishop of Urgell, against the Caliphate with Ermengol I of Urgell and Bernard I of Besalú, and joined forces with Muhammad II of Córdoba. Their army destroyed the forces of Caliph Sulayman II and sacked Córdoba in May 1010, although Ermengol died as a result of the battle. Both Arnulf, of bishop of Vic and Sal·la, bishop of Urgell died on this campaign. On 2 June 1010, Ramon participated in the Battle of Aqbat al-Bakr on the side of the Muslim rebels as part of the Andalusian civil wars.

In 1015 and 1016 Ramon made further expeditions to the rivers Ebro and Segre. The treasure obtained from these campaigns maintained the loyalty of his barons.

Within the County of Barcelona he ensured the repopulation of the Segarra, Conca de Barberà and Camp de Tarragona. He was also the first Catalan ruler to mint his own coinage.

At his death in 1017, he was succeeded by his son Berenguer Ramon under the regency of his mother. He was reportedly buried in the Barcelona Cathedral, but his grave was lost.

== Marriage and children ==
In 991, Ramon married Ermesinde of Carcassonne, with whom he had:

- Borrell Ramon
- Berenguer Ramon (c. 1006)
- (Possibly) Etienette (Stephanie), who married, firstly, Roger I of Tosny, and, secondly, García Sánchez III of Pamplona.

== Sources ==
- Bowman, Jeffrey A. (2002). "The Bishop Builds a Bridge: Sanctity and Power in the Medieval Pyrenees". The Catholic Historical Review. 88, No. 1 (Jan.).
- Erdmann, Carl (1977). The Origin of the Idea of Crusade. Princeton: Princeton University Press.
- Graham-Leigh, Elaine (2005). The Southern French Nobility and the Albigensian Crusade. The Boydell Press. ISBN 978-1-84383-129-7.
- Grifoll, Isabel (2017). "The Culture (Ninth-Twelfth Centuries): Clerics and Troubadours". In Sabaté, Flocel (ed.). The Crown of Aragon: A Singular Mediterranean Empire. Brill.
- Nelson, Lynn Harry, ed. (1991). The Chronicle of San Juan de la Peña: A Fourteenth-century Official History of the Crown of Aragon. University of Pennsylvania Press. ISBN 978-0-8122-1352-2.

Ramon Borrell House of Barcelona Born: 972 Died: 1017
Preceded by Borrel II	Count of Barcelona; 992–1017	Succeeded by Berenguer Ramon I
