= Giselbert II of Roussillon =

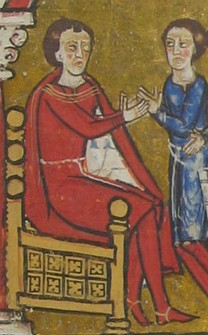

Giselbert II (Spanish: Guislaberto, Catalan: Guislabert) (died 1102) was the count of Roussillon from the death of his father, Gausfred II, in 1074 until his own death. His mother was Adelaide.

In 1040, he participated in his father's sack of Ampurias. He himself had a peace treaty with Ponç I of Ampurias that lasted from 1075 to 1085. In 1082, he fought alongside Count Hugh II of Empúries at the battle of Almenar.

He married Estefania and was succeeded by his son Girard.

Preceded by Gausfred II	Count of Roussillon; 1074–1102	Succeeded by Girard I
