= Josserande de la Flotte =

Jossande de Flotte, Countess of Forcalquier
- Born: circa 1110; Flotte, Charente-Maritime, France
- Died: 1152
- Spouses: Bertrand I, Count of Forcalquier
- Issue: Guillaume IV, Count of Forcalquier; 1130–1208; Bertrand II, Count of Forcalquier; 1135–1207; Alix, Countess of Forcalquier 1150–1219; Azalaïs de Forcalquier 1115–1151 Viscountess of Lautrec
- Father: Pierre Arnaud de la Flotte, dit "Flotte" the Seigneur De Ravel and Bégueline
- Mother: Adelaide de Comps

Jossande de Flotte, also known as Josserande de Fleet, Josserane, or Josserande Flotte, (d. ca. 1151 CE) was a noblewoman born to Pierre Arnaud de la Flotte and Adelaide de Comps.

== Birth ==
There seems to be some debate on her exact birthdate but it has been listed on multiple sources as, 1104, 1106, c. 1110, or c. 1120. More research will need to be conducted of contemporary sources to determine the exact date.

She was born in La Flotte, which is a commune on the Île de Ré, an island in the Atlantic Ocean off the midwestern coast of France.

== Family ==
She was the sister of Henri I Lambert de Flotte (c. 1090). She was married to Bertrand I, Count of Forcalquier, in the Kingdom of France around the year 1130. There is debate on the marriage date, and more research will need to be done to confirm the exact date. Some sources state that the marriage date was in 1135, yet it is a disgrace for a countess to bear a child to a count illegitimately. Since her first child with Bertrand I was born in 1130 and he is listed as legitimate heir, this would show that their marriage must have been before 1130. She then became the Countess of Forcalquier upon marrying Bertrand I, Count of Forcalquier. She bore a son, Guillaume IV in 1130, and heir to Forcalquier. She would go on to bear three other children, a son, Bertrand II (1135–1207), and daughters Alix (1150–1219) and Azalais.

This quote was cited on a genealogical website about Josserande De Flotte:

"The state of Provence, containing what is most remarkable in the ..." by Robert de Briancon:

"... But whatever it may be, this family of Flotte is very old in Provence and there is a great appearance which she defends of Arnaud Flotte, who, in the year 1150, is named among the Gentishommes of the country, who followed the party of Count Raimond Berenger, against the Princess Etiennette des Baux, called Jofferande Fleet epousa Bertrand second, Earl of Forcalquier ... "
