= Bellonids =

Counts descended from the Goth Belló

The Bellonids (Catalan: Bel·lònides, Spanish: Bellónidas, French: Bellonides), sometimes called the Bellonid Dynasty, were the counts descended from the Goth Belló who ruled in Carcassonne, Urgell, Cerdanya, County of Conflent, Barcelona, and numerous other Hispanic and Gothic march counties in the 9th and 10th centuries. His most famous grandson was Wilfred the Hairy, who founded the House of Barcelona, rulers of the County of Barcelona from 878, and since 1164 the Crown of Aragon, until the end of the reign of Martin the Humane in 1410.

Since the early years of the 10th century all of the eastern counties of the Hispanic March and the counties of Conflent, Carcassonne, Foix, and Razès of the Gothic March were ruled by Belló's descendants. This would have favored the co-ruling of some territories, and a clan-like network of mutual support, although they would have also been exposed to the risk of endogamy.
