= Arnau Ramon of Pallars Jussà =

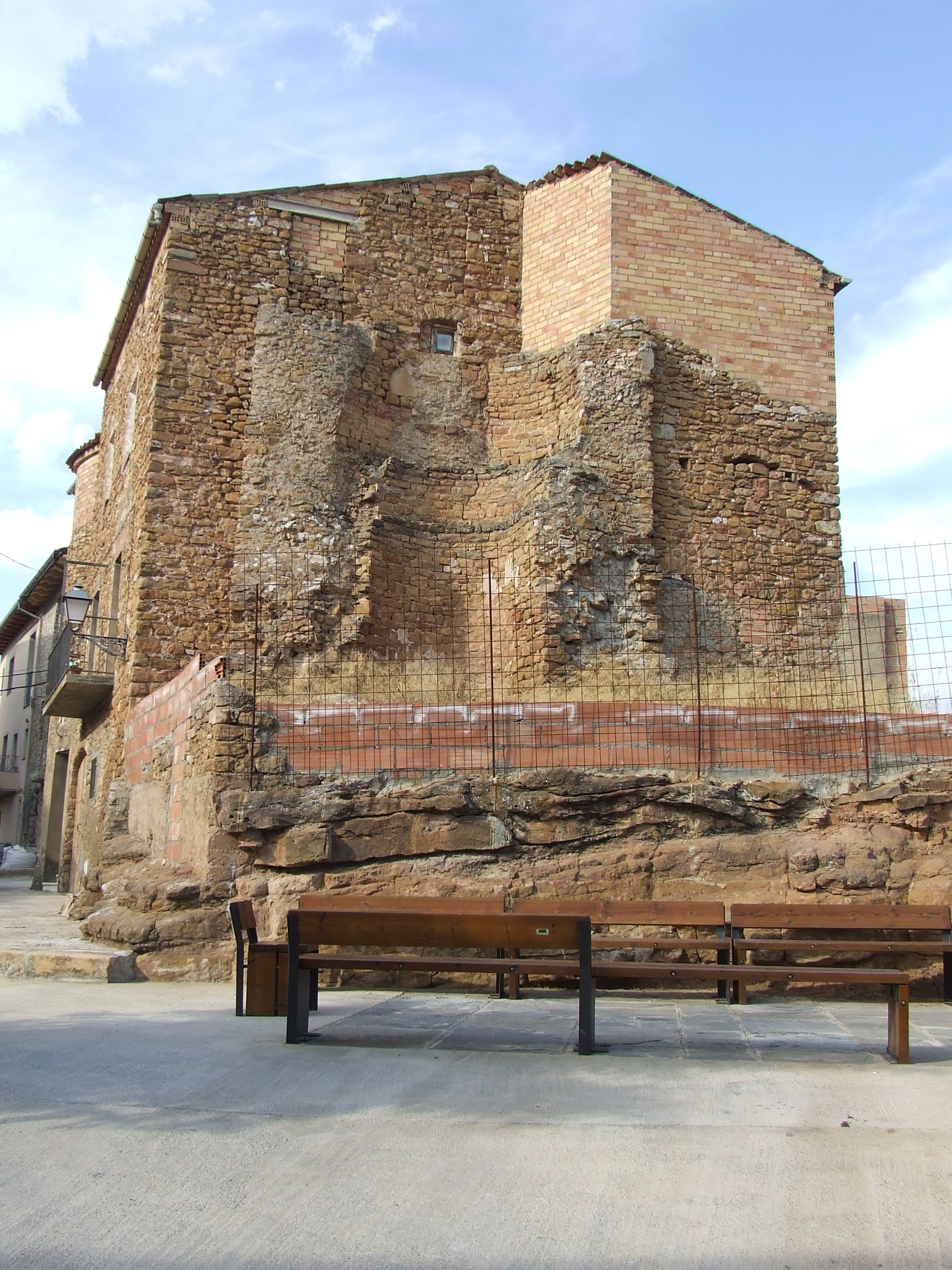
The Torre de la Presó, remains of the castle of Talarn, once held by Arnau Ramon

Arnau Ramon (died 1112) was the Count of Pallars Jussà from 1098 until his death. He was the second son of Ramon IV and co-ruled with his elder brother Pere Ramon until the latter's death in 1111. After this he was succeeded by his younger brother Bernat Ramon. There is preserved a document recording how Ramon IV exempted Arnau from owing his brother Pere potestas for the castle of Talarn:

Et mandavit Raimundus comes que non donasset potestatem Arnallus iamdictus de ipso castro de Talarn a Petro comite, si non erat bauzia conprobata.	And Count Ramon ordered that the aforementioned Arnau should not give potestas for that castle of Talarn, unless he was proved a traitor.

The right of potestas ("power") was the right of a superior to assume direct control of a castle upon request.
