= Guillemundus =

Count of Razès and Conflent

Guillemundus (also Guillemó) (died 827) was count of Razès and Conflent, in what is now southern France.

He was the son of Bera, Count of Barcelona. He received these counties from delegation of his father in 812. Guillemundus retained the counties when Bera was exiled to Rouen in 821/22. In 826 he joined the revolt of Aissó and, routed, fled to Córdoba.
