= County of Manresa =

Coordinates: 41.7282°N 1.8263°E

The County of Manresa (Catalan: Comtat de Manresa, Spanish: Condado de Manresa) is the western extremity of the County of Osona, divided into the Moianès and Bages. Through the Reconquista, Manresa was extended as far as Anoia, Segarra, and Urgell.

The castle at Manresa dates from the last quarter of the ninth century. In that period, the region, depopulated since the rebellion of Aissó in 826, was repopulated by settlers from the overpopulated regions of Pallars and Cerdanya. The repopulated regions came under the control of Wilfred the Hairy, who gave them their ecclesiastical and political organisation. The Valle de Lord was attached to the County of Urgell and the pagus of Berga (Berguedà) to the County of Cerdanya, but the region of the Ripollès, the Lluçanès, the Plana de Vic, and the Guilleries were structured around the city of Ausa, a region which in ancient times had been ethnically distinct, inhabited by the Ausetani. The County of Ausona was thus born and to it Wilfred attached the Moianés and Bages, which already had their own traditional capital, Manresa, which had historically been the region of the Lacetani.

From the year 906, it is clear from documents that Manresa never possessed any judicial or administrative significance — it never had a viscount — rather it was a geographical unit solely. The centre of Manresa was the pagus of the same name. The most notable difference between Manresa and the rest of Ausona was due to privileges granted by King Odo in 889 and 890 whereby he gave Manresa the right, because of its position on the front line against Moorish aggression, to build towers of defence called manresanas or manresanes. Manresa fell into disuse as a term in the twelfth century, when the county was divided into veguerias.

== Sources ==
- Lewis, Archibald Ross. The Development of Southern French and Catalan Society, 718–1050. University of Texas Press: Austin, 1965.
