= Count of Girona =

Spanish nobility title

The Counts of Girona (Catalan: Comtes de Girona, Spanish: Condes de Gerona) ruled over the County of Girona (currently in Catalonia), the earliest-established of the Catalan Counties which formed the Marca Hispanica. The line was established by the Frankish noble Charles Rostan, Rostany, first Count of Girona (785-801) at the time of Sa'dun al Ruayni.

== Subsequent counts ==
- Odilon (801-812)
- Bera (812-820)
- Rampo (820-826)
- Bernard I (826-832), first reign
- Berengar (832-835)
- Bernard I (836-844), second reign
- Sunifred I (844-848)
- Wilfred I (848-852)
- Odalric (852-858)
- Humfrid (858-864)
- Otger (861-870)
- Bernat (870-878)
- Wilfred II (878-897)

== See also ==
- Catalan Counties
- Marca Hispanica
- Principality of Catalonia
