= Aisso =

Ayxun or Aissó was a nobleman who led a revolt in Barcelona, Ausona, and Girona in 826 to 827. His identity is uncertain.

Aissó is thought to have been either a Goth and former lieutenant of the deposed Count Berà, or an Arab (Ayxun ibn Sulayman ibn Yaqdhan al-Arabí), the son of Sulayman al-Arabi who had been imprisoned in Aachen after being captured by Frankish forces at Girona.

After Bernat of Septimania was anointed Count of Barcelona, Aisso joined the revolt against the new count. Only the castle of Roda de Ter, in the county of Ausona, resisted and was destroyed by revolters. Many Goth nobles joined Aissó and Guillemó (or Guillemundus) son of Berà and Count of Rasez and Conflent.

Aissó raided the County of Cerdanya and the region of Vallés from his base in the centre of Catalonia. The young Count Bernat requested and received some help from the Emperor, as well as from some local Goth noblemen or "Hispani" (826).

Faced with this opposition, Aissó appealed to the sole power that could be compared to the Franks, the Emir of Córdoba. He sent a deputation, led by his brother, to request help from Abd ar-Rahman II. He sent his General, Ubayd Allah (also known as Abu Marwan), who arrived in Zaragoza in May 827. From there, his forces entered the territory of the County of Barcelona, reaching the City of Barcelona later that summer. The city was besieged without success; however, the surroundings were ransacked. The army then moved to Girona, which was attacked on October 10, 827.

When Louis I the Pious heard of the Muslim raid, he ordered to his son Pepin I of Aquitaine, and Counts Hugo of Tours and Matfred of Orleans to recruit an army. However, recruitment was slow and, by the time it was formed, Abu Merwan was already returning south. The rebels fled with them in 826. Aissó probably sought refuge in Córdoba, where he was later murdered on the orders of the Emir, who was suspicious of a conspiracy. Guillemó also lived the rest of his life in exile in Córdoba.
