= Borrell, Count of Osona =

Visigoth noble (died 820)

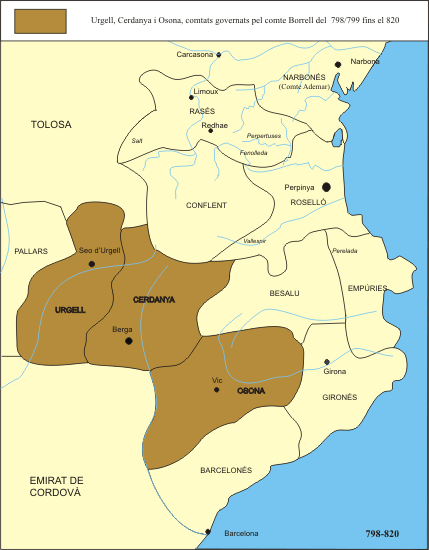
The territories of Borrell

Borrell I was the first count of Cerdanya, Urgell, and Osona from between 797 and 799 to his death in 820. He was a Visigoth nobleman, probably from Cerretana (Cerdanya).

In the final years of the eighth century, the Franks under Charlemagne and his son Louis the Pious, king of Aquitaine, were subduing the Marca Hispanica and expanding southwards into Moorish territory. When Urgell and Cerdanya were subdued around 798, Borrel was appointed count. He took a very active part in the subsequent conquest of Osona in 799 and the successful siege of Barcelona in 801. He may have been named count in Osona as a reward for his services.

In 804 and 805, he participated in the expeditions to Tortosa, but not in the subsequent campaigns of 807, 808, and 809.

He died in 820 and Osona was given to Rampon, Count of Barcelona. Urgell and Cerdanya were granted to Aznar Galíndez I.

New title	Count of Osona; 799–820	Succeeded by Rampon, Count of Barcelona
New title	Count of Urgell; 798–820	Succeeded by Aznar Galíndez I
New title	Count of Cerdanya; 798–820	Succeeded by Aznar Galíndez I
