= Rampon, Count of Barcelona =

Rampon (Rampó) was the second count of the Catalan counties of Barcelona and Osona from 820 until his death in 825.

Rampon was given the county of Barcelona, by Louis the Pious, King of Aquitaine, following Bera's accusation of treason, trial by combat, and his subsequent defeat. During his time as count of Barcelona, Rampon founded monasteries, all of Frankish origin, thus spreading Carolingian hegemony throughout the Spanish March.

Rampon was ruler of Barcelona, Girona, and Besalú with the title of Count, but possibly also Margrave; the latter title was reserved only for the rulers of border counties.

In 821, the Court at Aachen ordered Rampon to attack Muslim territory, an order which he carried out in 822, ransacking land up to the river Segre. The same year, Louis the Pious at the request of Rampon, granted privileges to the monastery Saint-Stephen of Banyoles.

Rampon died in 825. However, it was not until an assembly in Aachen in February 826 that Louis designated his successor to be Bernard of Septimania, the son of William of Gellone, Count of Toulouse, and younger half-brother of Gaucelm, Count of Empúries and Roussillon.

== Sources ==
- Chandler, Cullen J. (2019). Carolingian Catalonia: Politics, Culture, and Identity in an Imperial Province, 778–987. Cambridge University Press.
- Lewis, Archibal R. (1965). The Development of Southern French and Catalan Society, 718-1050. University of Texas Press.

Preceded by Bera	Count of Barcelona; 820–825	Succeeded by Bernard I
Preceded by Borrell	Count of Osona; 820–825	Succeeded by Bernard I
