= Bertrand II of Forcalquier =

Bertrand II, Count of Forcalquier (d. 1207), was the son of Bertrand I Count of Forcalquier and his wife Josserande de la Flotte, daughter of Arnaud de la Flotte Seigneur de Ravel. He was the grandson of William III of Forcalquier Marquis of Provence and Gersende of Albon.

He co-ruled Forcalquier with his brother, also a child of Bertrand I Count of Forcalquier and Josserande de la Flotte, William IV Count of Forcalquier (1130 – Nov. 1208) who married Adelaide de Beziers, and whose granddaughter succeeded them.

Bertrand II married Cécile de Béziers, probably a member of the Trencavel family, and had:

- Béatrix, who married Pons Justas
- Cécile, who married Roger III († 1257), vicomte de Couserans and comte de Pallars.
