= Siege of Tortosa (808–809) =

808–809 siege during the Carolingian conquest of the Spanish March

- Part of the Reconquista
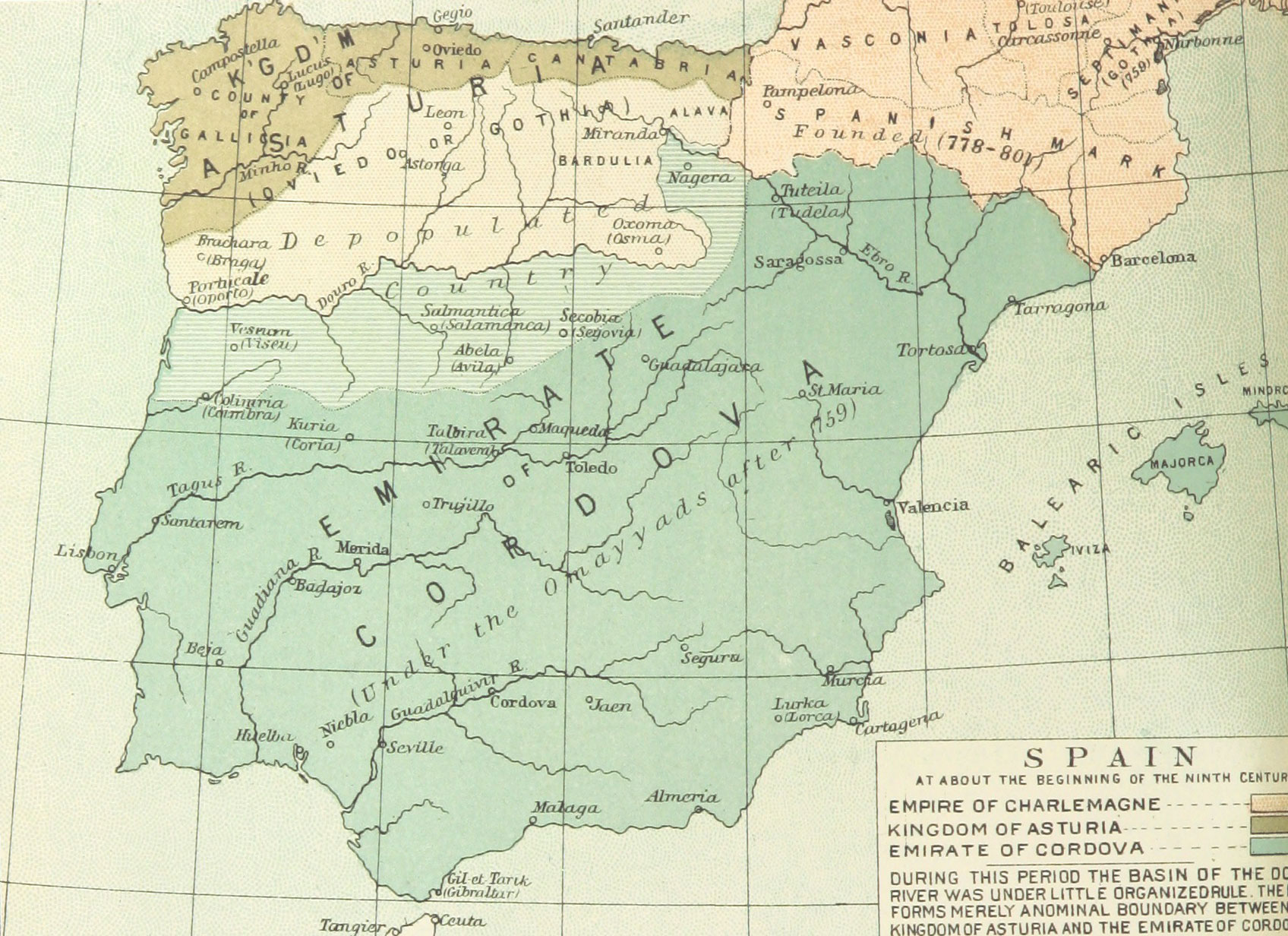
- Iberian Peninsula early 9th Century
Date	808–809
Location	Tortosa
Result	Umayyad victory

Belligerents
Carolingian Empire	Emirate of Córdoba

Commanders and leaders
Ingobert (808); Louis the Pious (809)	ʿAbdūn (808) ʿAbd al-Raḥmān II (809) ʿAmrūs ibn Yūsuf (809)

Strength
Aquitanians, Franks, Basques (?); Rams and trebuchets	Unknown

The siege of Tortosa was a military campaign by King Louis the Pious of Aquitaine in 808–809. It was part of a decade of intense activity by Louis against the Umayyad Emirate of Córdoba in the region of the lower Ebro. The chronology of his campaigns, which must be worked out from both Latin and Arabic sources, is subject to different interpretations.

The siege was begun in 808 by Ingobert, Louis arriving the following year with a larger army and siege train. The earliest reference to trebuchets in western Europe is made in connection with this siege. Louis failed to take Tortosa or force its surrender, but he may have received a formal submission before retiring to his own kingdom. The Arabic sources present him as defeated by a relieving force, while at least one Latin source suggests that the walls were in fact breached.

== Background and first siege ==
The siege of Tortosa was part of a decade of intense activity by Louis against the Umayyads in the region of Catalonia. Following Louis's capture of Barcelona in 801, the southern boundary of Carolingian dominion was the river Llobregat, while the northern boundary of the Umayyads was the Ebro. The land between became a violent and depopulated frontier zone. Tortosa was the most important Umayyad fortification on this frontier and effectively the furthest Umayyad outpost in Catalonia.

The chronology of Louis's campaigns is confusing and has led to different reconstructions. The Vita Hludovici, a Latin biography of Louis, describes three campaigns against Tortosa. The Muslim Arabic chroniclers Ibn ʿIdhārī and al-Maqqarī note two Carolingian attacks on Tortosa in the period AH 192–193 (807–809). The campaigns are also mentioned in Ibn Khaldūn's al-ʿIbar and Ibn Saʿīd's al-Mughrib.

Louis first laid siege to Tortosa sometime between 802 and 807. This attack is not mentioned in the Muslim sources. During the campaign, Louis sent a detachment under Adhemar, Isembard, Bera and Borrell to raid across the Ebro and Cinca. Over the course of twenty days, they sacked Villa Rubea, ravaged the countryside and defeated a Muslim army before rejoining the main army, whereupon Louis lifted his siege and returned to Aquitaine. He does not appear to have seriously invested the city. There is no record of the use of siege engines. Tarragona was attacked and possibly even captured on this campaign.

== Campaign of 808–809 ==
A second attack was launched against Tortosa in 808. Louis did not lead it personally. The Emperor Charles sent his own vassus and missus, Ingobert, to begin the siege, while Adhemar and Bera again launched raids across the Ebro. The raiders' presence was detected by horse dung floating down the Ebro from their position upriver. They nonetheless managed to sack an Umayyad camp and defeated an army sent by ʿAbdūn, the wālī (governor) of Tortosa, before going home with substantial loot. Ingobert, however, continued the siege through the winter.

Louis led a third campaign against Tortosa in 809. He brought Aquitanian reinforcements and equipment to Ingobert's ongoing siege. Further reinforcements under the command of Heribert were sent by Charles from Francia proper. Isembard and Count Liutard of Fezensac were also present. Liutard may have brought with him a contingent of Basques. The main accounts of the siege operations and outcome, in the Vita Hludovici and the Annales regni Francorum, do not exactly match:

On arriving [at Tortosa, Louis] battered and wore down the city with rams, mangonels, covered sheds, and other torments, so that its citizens abandoned hope, and seeing that Mars had turned against them and that they were beaten, they handed over the keys of the city, which Louis on his return sent to his father with great satisfaction. These events, carried out in such a way, struck great anxiety in the Saracens and Moors, for they feared a similar fate might be in store for each city. So forty days after he had begun the siege, the king went home from the city and reentered his kingdom.

— Vita Hludovici, §16

In the west the Lord King Louis entered Spain with his army and besieged the city of Tortosa on the River Ebro. When he had devoted some time to the siege and had seen that he could not take the city quickly, he gave up and returned to Aquitaine with his army unimpaired.

— Annales regni Francorum, s.a. 809

The "covered sheds" in the Vita's description of Louis siege works refers to mobile shelters used to protect soldiers from projectiles. The reference to mangonels is the first in Western Europe. The stone-throwing machine in question, long known in the Byzantine Empire, was the traction trebuchet. Louis's siege, his personal presence before Tortosa, lasted forty days. Although some historians read the Vita as saying that Louis succeeded in breaching the walls, most agree that he simply accepted a formal act of submission and retired.

Some later Muslims sources report a different outcome. The caliph's son and heir, the future ʿAbd al-Raḥmān II, along with the commander of the Upper March, ʿAmrūs ibn Yūsuf, is said to have led a relief force that rescued the city. According to Ibn Ḥayyān, "the polytheists [were] routed and many Franks annihilated." Al-Maqqarī also reports a Frankish defeat.

== Aftermath ==
Following the failure to take Tortosa by force, there was an attack on Huesca in 810. Both failed. The siege of the latter was undertaken by Heribert on Charles's behalf, but he appears to have had insufficient troops. After the failure at Huesca, a treaty was negotiated with the Umayyads in 811. The frontier north of the Ebro became stable for several centuries.

== Bibliography ==
- Auzias, L (1936). "Les sièges de Barcelone, de Tortose et d'Huesca (801–811): Essai chronologique". Annales du Midi. 48 (189): 5–28. doi:10.3406/anami.1936.5308.
- Bachrach, B. S. (1974). "Military Organization in Aquitaine under the Early Carolingians". Speculum. 49 (1): 1–33. doi:10.2307/2856549. JSTOR 2856549. S2CID 162218193.
- Chandler, C. J. (2019). Carolingian Catalonia: Politics, Culture, and Identity in an Imperial Province, 778–987. Cambridge University Press.
- Collins, R. J. H. (2012). Caliphs and Kings: Spain, 796–1031. Wiley Blackwell.
- El-Hajji, Abdurrahman A. (1991). "Andalusian Diplomatic Relations with the Franks during the Umayyad Period". Islamic Studies. 30: 241–262.
- Kennedy, Hugh (1996). Muslim Spain and Portugal: A Political History of al-Andalus. Routledge.
- Manzano-Moreno, E. (1992). "Oriental Topoi in Andalusian Historical Sources". Arabica. 39 (1): 42–58. doi:10.1163/157005892x00283.
- Noble, T. F. X., ed. (2009). Charlemagne and Louis the Pious: The Lives by Einhard, Notker, Ermoldus, Thegan and the Astronomer. Pennsylvania State University Press.
- Petersen, L. I. R. (2013). Siege Warfare and Military Organization in the Successor States (400–800 AD): Byzantium, the West and Islam. Brill.
- Purton, P. F. (2009). A History of the Early Medieval Siege, c. 450–1220. Boydell Press.
- Scholz, B. W.; Rogers, B., eds. (1972). Carolingian Chronicles: Royal Frankish Annals and Nithard's Histories. University of Michigan Press. ISBN 9780472061860.
- Viguera, M. J. (2000). "Ṭarrakūna" (pp. 303–304) and "Ṭurṭūsha" (pp. 738–739). In Bearman, P. J.; Bianquis, Th.; Bosworth, C. E.; van Donzel, E. & Heinrichs, W. P., eds. (2000). The Encyclopaedia of Islam, Second Edition. Volume X: T–U. Leiden: E. J. Brill. ISBN 978-90-04-11211-7.
- Wolff, P. (1965). "Les événements de Catalogne de 798–812 et la chronologie de l'Astronome". Anuario de Estudios Medievales. 2: 451–458. ProQuest 1300190655
