= Girard I of Roussillon =

Catalan noble

Gerard I (Girard in French and Catalan, Gerardo in Spanish), called Guinard, was the count of Roussillon from 1102 to his murder in 1113. He was the son and heir of Giselbert II.

He participated in the First Crusade, possibly in the retinue of Raymond IV of Toulouse, although the database of Riley-Smith, et al., is uncertain of his affiliation. He was at the Siege of Antioch and was one of the first in Jerusalem after the successful siege of 15 July 1099.

He returned to Roussillon for the period between 1100 and 1105. He returned to the Holy Land at the request of Raymond, then besieging Tripoli. During his absence, his wife, the Countess Agnes, governed Roussillon. In 1112, Raymond's successor, Bertrand, died and Gerard returned once more to his county. Not long after his return, he was assassinated in unknown circumstances. His son Gausfred III was too young to rule and his brother Arnold Gausfred acted as regent. His daughter Beatrice married William of Narbonne.

== Sources ==
- Prof. J. S. C. Riley-Smith, Prof, Jonathan Phillips, Dr. Alan V. Murray, Dr. Guy Perry, Dr. Nicholas Morton, A Database of Crusaders to the Holy Land, 1099-1149 (available on-line)

Preceded by Giselbert II	Count of Roussillon; 1102–1113	Succeeded by Gausfred III
