= William III of Forcalquier =

William I (born c. 1085 and died October 1129) was the Count of Forcalquier and Marquis of Provence from 1094. He was the second son of Count Ermengol IV of Urgell and the only son of Adelaide of Forcalquier, heiress of Count William Bertrand of Provence.

William married Gersende, daughter of Count Guigues III of Albon. They had two sons, Guigues of Forcalquier and Bertrand I.

On the death of his father in 1092, he received a part of the parias (tribute) from the taifa of Zaragoza. His father's will, now lost, enjoined him and his brother Ermengol V, who inherited Urgell, to fight continuously against the Muslims.

William inherited a share of Provence (Forcalquier) on the death of his maternal grandfather in 1094. He died in Avignon.

== Sources ==
- Miret i Sans, Joaquim (1904). "La casa condal de Urgell en Provenza". Butlletí de la Reial Acadèmia de Bones Lletres de Barcelona. 2 (9).
