= Bertrand I of Forcalquier =

12th-century nobleman

Bertrand I of Forcalquier (c. 1104 – 1150) was Count of Forcalquier from 1129 to 1144. He was the second son of William III and Gersende of Albon.

He married Josserande de Flotte, daughter of Arnould de Flotte and Adelaide de Comps. Their sons, Bertrand and William, were counts of Forcalquier.
