= County of Forcalquier =

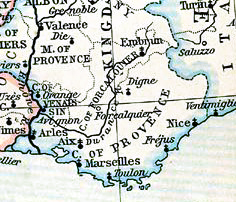
Map of Forcalquier c. 1184

The County of Forcalquier was a medieval county in the region of Provence in the Kingdom of Arles, then part of the Holy Roman Empire. It was named after the fortress around which it grew, Forcalquier.

The earliest mention of a castle at Forcalquier dates to 1044, when it was in the possession of Fulk Bertrand, joint count of Provence. When Fulk died in 1051 his lands were shared between his sons William Bertrand and Geoffrey II, who inherited Forcalquier. Sometime in the 1060s Forcalquier was inherited by William's daughter Adelaide, who was the first person to be styled "Countess of Forcalquier". She married Ermengol IV of Urgell and died in 1129, at a time when Provence was sharply disputed by the many persons who had inherited some title to it. The counts of Toulouse claimed the title marchio as descendants of Emma of Provence, while the counts of Barcelona laid claim to Provence as descendants of Douce I. In 1125 a formal division of Provence into a march and a county was effected, but in 1131 a new claimant, the House of Baux, provoked a series of wars, the Baussenque Wars, fought over the rights to the county of Provence. Meanwhile, the county north of the Durance, with Forcalquier and Embrun, had devolved to Adelaide's son by Ermengol, William III (the enumeration of counts of Forcalquier includes earlier counts of Provence). William III and his descendants, a cadet branch of the counts of Urgell, continued to rule Forcalquier until the end of the century, when the Treaty of Aix (1193) gave in marriage the last count's granddaughter, Garsenda of Sabran, to Alfonso, son of Alfonso II of Aragon and heir of the county of Provence. Their marriage in July 1193, Alfonso's inheritance in 1196, and Garsenda's in 1209 united the two counties permanently.

== List of counts ==
Arms of the County of Forcalquier

- 1110?–1129 Adelaide of Forcalquier

=== House of Barcelona ===
- 1110?–1129 William I, husband and co-ruler of previous
- 1129–1149 Guigues, co-ruling with...
- 1129–1144 Bertrand I
- 1144–1207 Bertrand II, co-ruling with...
- 1144–1209 William IV
- 1209–1217/1220 Garsenda II
- 1220–after United to Provence in the person of Raymond Berengar V
