= County of Razès =

European state

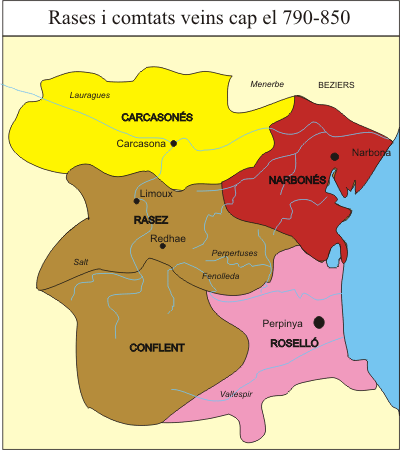
The ancient County of Razes, circa 790-850

The County of Razès was a feudal jurisdiction in Occitania, south of the County of Carcassonne, in what is now Southern France. It was founded in 781, after the creation of the Kingdom of Aquitania, when Septimania was separated from that state.

== History ==
The county had its seat in Rhedae, a Roman and later Visigoth town conquered by the Franks in 756, together with Septimania. In 781 Charlemagne created the Kingdom of Aquitaine for his infant son Louis. About 790 he sent his first cousin William of Gellone to be the count of Toulouse and the duke of Septimania. After the conquest of Barcelona in 801, Bera was appointed Count of Barcelona by Louis of Aquitaine and Charlemagne. He delegated the two counties, Razès and Confluent, to his son Guillemundus in around 820. Guillemundus rebelled against Bernard of Septimania, who succeeded his father, William of Gellone, as count of Toulouse and Duke of Septimania. Gillemundus was defeated and went into exile in Córdoba. Razès and Conflent went to Bernard. Bernard was deposed in 832 by Pepin's father Louis the Pious, and his lands assigned to Berengar the Wise who had helped subdue Bernard of Septimania and Pepin. Berengar died in 835, and Bernard's territories were returned to him.

Pepin died in 838 and his father Louis the Pious in 840. That same year, Pepin's son Pepin II was "elected" king by the nobles of Aquitaine (despite the fact Louis the Pious had granted the territory to his youngest son, Charles the Bald). So a dispute developed between Pepin II and King Charles the Bald. Bernard I of Septimania joined on the side of Pepin II. After he was captured at the Battle of Toulouse in 844, Charles the Bald ordered Septimania's execution in May 844.

So, in 844, Argila, son of Bera and brother of Guillemundus, was restored in Razès and Conflent. He died shortly afterwards, to be succeeded by Bera II and then by the latter's son, Miro the Elder. Miro was deposed after rebelling against Charles the Bald. At around 850 Razès was united to the county of Carcassonne.

== Rhedae and Rennes-le-Château ==
Louis Fédié (1815–1899), the 19th-century author, amateur historian and president of the Société des Arts et Sciences in Carcassonne, popularised the claim that Rhedae was the village of Rennes-le-Château in his 1880 book Le Comté de Razès et le diocèse d'Alet. His 19th-century identification is widely disputed by professional French archaeologists and historians, and the precise location of Rhedae remains unknown. It was probably near modern Quillan, which is a major crossroads town about 20 kilometers south of Limoux in the heart of the ancient County of Razès, now in Aude .

Putnam and Wood have noted the difficulty in understanding how the name Rhedae could have been changed to Rennes-le-Château; and Rhedae was cited as being "located at the crossing point of four major roads: how could this possibly be the case at Rennes-le-Château on its isolated hilltop?"

== See also ==
- Aude
- Rennes-le-Château
