= Adelaide of Forcalquier =

Adelaide of Forcalquier (11th century – after 1129) was a suo jure reigning countess of Forcalquier from 1110 to 1129.

She was the daughter of William Bertrand of Provence. She married Ermengol IV, Count of Urgell.
