= Ermengol IV =

11th-century Catalonian count

Ermengol or Armengol IV (1056–1092), called el de Gerb or Gerp, was the count of Urgell from 1066 to his death. He was the son of Ermengol III and Adelaide. (Note: In a charter dated 1066 – 1076, he appears as Ermengaudum, Urgellensem comitem, filium Adalaidis comitisse (Ermengol, count of Urgell, son of Countess Adelaide), and, in another charter, dated 1069 – 1071, he identifies himself as Ego, Ermengaudus comes Urgelli, filius qui sum comitisse Adalaidis (I, Ermengol count of Urgell, son of Countess Adelaide). In this charter, he swears fealty to his brother-in-law William I, Count of Cerdanya and promises that if he died without issue, the County of Urgell would be inherited by his sister Isabella.) (Note: Adelaide's family is not known with certainty, though some scholars have considered her the daughter of Guillem I, Count of Besalú.)

Ermengol inherited Urgell when he was only ten years old and ruled under the tutelage of the countess dowager, Sancha, third wife of his father, until he was twelve. During this brief minority, the nobility took the opportunity to plunder and occupy the comital demesne. It was not until 1075 that Ermengol had genuine control of his county and his nobles.

Ermengol was an active count. During his reign, Urgell profited economically, collecting tribute from Lleida and Fraga. In 1076, having brought the nobles to submission, he began a Reconquista of his own, taking the basin of the river Sió with the villages of Agramunt and Almenar that year and Linyola and Belcaire in 1091. He conquered Calassanç and built a castle at Gerb, Spain, where he later died, in an effort to pave the way to the recapture of Balaguer, which occurred during the reign of his son, Ermengol V, in 1102.

Ermengol IV was a firm supporter of the contemporary Gregorian reform of the Church, which he introduced to Urgell. In 1077, Ermengol married Lucy, daughter of Artau I, Count of Pallars Sobirà, and granddaughter of Bernard I of La Marche. With her, he had his son and heir, the aforementioned Ermengol V.

In 1079, he remarried to Adelaide of Forcalquier, daughter of William Bertrand of Provence. They had a son, William, who inherited Forcalquier, and a daughter who died young. Ermengol IV died in 1092.

== Sources ==
- Baiges, Ignasi J.; Feliu, Gaspar; Salrach, Josep M. (2010). Els pergamins de l'Arxiu Comtal de Barcelona, de Ramon Berenguer II a Ramon Berenguer IV (PDF) (in Catalan). Vol. I. (Coord.). Barcelona: Fundació Noguera. ISBN 978-84-9779-958-4.
- Fernández-Xesta y Vázquez, Ernesto (2001). Relaciones del condado de Urgel con Castilla y León (in Spanish). Madrid: E&P Libros Antiguos, S.L. ISBN 84-87860-37-0.
- Turton, William H. (2005) [First published in 1900]. The Plantagenet Ancestry. London: Clearfield Company. ISBN 9780806303307.

Preceded by Ermengol III	Count of Urgell; 1066–1092	Succeeded by Ermengol V
