= Viscounts of Narbonne =

The viscount of Narbonne was the secular ruler of Narbonne in the Middle Ages. Narbonne had been the capital of the Visigoth province of Septimania, until the 8th century, after which it became the Carolingian Viscounty of Narbonne. Narbonne was nominally subject to the Carolingian counts of Toulouse but was usually governed autonomously. The city was a major port on the Mediterranean Sea. In the 12th century, Ermengarde of Narbonne (reigned 1134 to 1192) presided over one of the cultural centers where the spirit of courtly love was developed. In the 15th century Narbonne passed to the County of Foix and in 1507 to the royal domain of France.

== Other governors of Narbonne ==
=== Muslim governors ===
- Umar ibn Umar (747-?)
- Abd ar-Rahman ibn Uqba (?-759)

=== Visigothic counts ===
- Gilbert (c. 750)
- Milo (c. 752-753)
- Unknown (753-759)

=== Carolingian counts ===
- Milo (restored, 759?-790? attested in 782)
- Adhemar (c. 790-817)
- Berà (817-820, also count of Barcelona)
- Leibulf of Provence (c. 820-828)
- Bernard of Septimania (828-829, also count of Barcelona)
- Gaucelm (829-830, also count of Roussillon)
- Bernard of Septimania (restored, 830-832)
- Berenguer the Wise (832-835, also count of Barcelona)
- Bernard of Septimania (restored, 835-844)
- Sunifred (844-848, also count of Barcelona)
- William of Septimania (848-849, also count of Barcelona)
- Aleran (849-852, also count of Barcelona)
- Odalric (852-857, also count of Barcelona)
- Humfrid (857-865, also count of Barcelona)
- Bernard of Gothia (865-878, also count of Barcelona)
- Bernard Plantapilosa (878)

After 830 the counts were gradually reduced to viscounts.

=== Carolingian vigerii ===
- Magnari (c. 790-c. 800)
- Esturmio (800-811)
- Quixilà (811-817)

== Viscounts of Narbonne ==
=== Independent viscounts ===
- Lindoi (876-878)
- Maiol I (878-911)
- Gauger or Gualquer (c. 911)
- Francis II (c. 911-924)
- Odo I (924-933)
  - Volverad (with Odo, c. 924-926)
- Matfred I (933-966 or 969)
- Raymond I (c. 969-1019/1023)
- Béranger (1019/1023-c. 1066)
- Raymond II (1066-1067)
- Bernard (1066-c. 1077)
- Aimery I (1077-1105)
- Aimery II (1105-1134)
- Ermengarde (1134-1192)
  - Alphonse I of Toulouse claimed the regency of Narbonne from 1134 to 1143 during Ermengarde's minority
  - Aimerico Manrique de Lara was the heir presumptive to his aunt, Ermengarde, from 1167 to his death in 1177

=== House of Lara ===
- Peter (1192-1202)
- Aimery III (1202-1239)
- Amalric I (1239-1270)
- Aimery IV (1270-1298)
- Amalric II (1298-1328)
- Aimery V (1328-1336)
- Amalric III (1336-1341)
- Aimery VI (1341-1388)
- William I (1388-1397)
- William II (1397-1424)

=== House of Tinières ===
- Peter of Tinières (1424-1447, ruled as William III)

=== House of Foix ===
- Gaston IV of Foix-Grailly (1447-1468, also count of Foix)
- John of Foix (1468-1500, also count of Étampes)
- Gaston of Foix (1500-1507, also duke of Nemours and count of Étampes)

In 1507, Narbonne passed to Louis XII of France.

== Sources ==
- Jacqueline Caille, "Ermengarde, vicomtesse de Narbonne (1127/29-1196/97). Une grande figure féminine du midi aristocratique", in La femme dans l'histoire et la société méridionales (IXe-XIXe siècles), Actes du 66e congrès de la Fédération Historique du Languedoc Méditerranéen et du Roussillon (Narbonne, October 15-16, 1994), Montpellier, 1995, pages 9-50.
- Thierry Stasser, "La maison vicomtale de Narbonne aux Xe et XIe siècles", Annales du Midi, v. 204, 1993, p. 489-507.
