= County of Melgueil =

The County of Melgueil (Occitan: Melguelh, modern Mauguio) was a fief of first the Carolingian Emperor, then the King of France, and finally (1085) the Papacy during the Middle Ages. Counts probably sat at Melgueil from the time of the Visigoths. The counts of Melgueil were also counts of Maguelonne and Substantion from at least the time of Peter's homage to Pope Gregory VII on 27 April 1085. In 1172 Beatriu disinherited her son Bertrand and named her daughter Ermessenda her heiress. Later that year Ermessenda married the future Raymond VI of Toulouse and by her will of 1176 the county was to go to Toulouse. Bertrand refused to recognise his disinheritance and pledged homage as Count of Melgueil to Alfonso II of Aragon in 1172. The county fell to the Toulouse in 1190 and was annexed to the French crown in 1213, during the Albigensian Crusade. At the Fourth Council of the Lateran in 1215 it was given to the Diocese of Maguelonne and secular and ecclesiastical authority were merged.

== List of counts ==
- Aigulf (c. 750)
- Amic (???–778), son of Agilulf
- Robert (778–???)
- Adolf
- Ernest
- Eberard (???–812)
- Bera (812–820), also Count of Barcelona
- Rampo (820–826), also Count of Barcelona
- Bernard of Septimania (826–832), also Margrave of Septimania
- Berengar the Wise (832–835), also Count of Toulouse
- Bernard of Septimania (836–844), also Margrave of Septimania
- Sunifred (844–848), also Count of Barcelona
- William of Septimania (848–850), also Margrave of Septimania
- Aleran (850–852), also Count of Barcelona
- Isembart (850–852), also Count of Barcelona
- Odalric (852–858), also Margrave of Septimania
- Humfrid (858–864), also Margrave of Gothia
- Bernard of Gothia (865–878), also Margrave of Gothia
- Guillermona (c.878–920), married to Robert of Magalona
- Bernard I (c.920–930), son of Guillermona
- Berengar (c.930–950), son of Bernard I
- Bernard II, Count of Melgueil (c. 950–988), son of Berengar
- N.N. (c.988–989), son of Bernard II
- Bernard III, Count of Melgueil (c. 989–1055), son of the son of Bernard II
- Raymond I (c.1055–1079), son of Bernard III
- Peter, Count of Melgueil (1079 – after 1085), son of Raymond I
- Raymond II (????–1120), son of Peter
- Bernard IV (1120–????), son of Raymond II
- Beatrice (c.1130–c.1190), daughter of Bernard IV, under the regency of her cousin William VI of Montpellier
- Berengar Raymond (1135–1144), first husband of Beatrice, also Count of Provence
- Bernard V of Pelet (1146–1172), second husband of Beatrice, also Lord of Alès
- Ermessenda (1170-1176), daughter of the previous
- Raymond VI (1173-1190), husband of the previous, also Count of Toulouse.

On the death of Beatrice the county was disputed. In 1172 it was divided. In 1190 it was reunited.
