= Battle of Toulouse (844) =

Battle of the Carolingian Civil War

- Part of Carolingian Civil War
Date	844
Location	Tolosa, Gallia Narbonensis I (modern Toulouse, France) 43.6045°N 1.444°E
Result	Frankish defeat

Belligerents
West Francia	Kingdom of Aquitaine

Commanders and leaders
Charles the Bald	Pepin II of Aquitaine

Strength
Unknown	Unknown

Casualties and losses
Unknown	Unknown

The Battle of Toulouse in 844 was part of the campaign by Charles the Bald in Aquitaine to force the submission of Pepin II of Aquitaine, the rebellious son of Pepin, the half-brother of Charles. The historical context of this battle is the three-year Carolingian civil war, culminating in the Battle of Fontenay-en-Puisaye in 841. Here Charles and Louis the German defeated their brother Lothair I, who retreated to the south with his army.

A key player in this intrigue was Bernard of Septimania, Count of Barcelona, who remained outside the battle awaiting its result, upon which he sent his son William of Septimania to offer homage to Charles and to promise him that his father would obtain the submission of Charles’ nephew Pepin II, who was claiming to rule Aquitaine. It seems that Bernard had no intention of keeping this last promise.

During Charles’ campaign in Aquitaine of 842, he decided to punish Bernard, dispossessing him of the county of Toulouse in favor of Acfred, Count of Toulouse. Bernard refused to accept the decision and revolted, openly allying himself to Pepin II and expelling Acfred from Toulouse in 843. Charles responded by sending Guerin, Duke of Provence, to direct the 842 campaign in Aquitaine against Bernard.

Renewed Viking invasions and Breton raids compelled an end to the internal civil struggles afflicting the empire and, in August 843, the Treaty of Verdun was signed between Charles, Louis, and Lothair. Septimania and Gothia were left in the hands of Charles. The county of Uzès, where Bernard still possessed estates, was assigned to Lothair. Furthermore, the county of Autun, which had long been lost to Bernard, and to which his son had renewed a claim, was given to Guerin.

In 844, Charles returned to Aquitaine with the objective of forcing Pepin II to submit and conquering Toulouse. Bernard was captured by the royal forces during the assault on Toulouse. In May 844, Bernard was presented to Charles, who ordered his execution. Ekkehard, Count of Hesbaye, and two of his sons were killed in the battle.

The Frankish troops were beaten by the Aquitanians near the river Agout and were forced to retreat without significant accomplishments. However, Pepin’s ally Nominoë, Duke of Brittany, refused to submit, and eventually defeated Charles in the Battle of Ballon on 22 November 845.

== Sources ==
- Reuter, Timothy (Translator), The Annals of Fulda, Manchester University Press, Manchester, 1992
- Lewis, Archibald R., The Dukes in the Regnum Francorum, A.D. 550-751, Speculum 51.3, July 1976
- Bury, J. B. (Editor), The Cambridge Medieval History, Volume III: Germany and the Western Empire, Cambridge University Press, Cambridge, 1922
