= Bernard II of Toulouse =

Bernard II (died 877), known as the Calf, was count of Toulouse, Rouergue, Limoges, Nîmes, Carcassonne, Razès, and Albi. He was the son of Raymond I and Bertha. The dates of his reign are uncertain, with sources citing either 865–877 or 864–872.

In 863, his father, loyal to Charles the Bald, was deposed by Humfrid, count of Barcelona. In 865, when his father died and Humfrid fled, Charles appointed him to the counties of Toulouse and Rouergue, probably including Pallars and Ribagorza, and Limoges. In 872, following the deposition of Oliba II of Carcassonne, he was given the counties of Albi, Nîmes, Carcassonne, and Razès. In 877, he was assassinated by a vassal of Bernard Plantapilosa, who took over Toulouse and Limoges. In Limoges, however, Bernard's brother Foucher, with the title of viscount, continued to exercise the power of government and is the founder of that great vicecomital family. Meanwhile, Oliba was reinstated in his old counties. In Pallars and Ribagorza, one Raymond I succeeded in separating those countships from the rest and inaugurating a new and de facto independent dynastic authority in the region.
