= Harun of Barcelona =

Andalusi politician

Harun of Barcelona (Arabic: هارون البرشلوني) was the last Wali of Barcelona, ruling from 800 to 801, during the Siege of Barcelona.

A Muwallad Muslim of local Visigothic stock, Harun succeeded as Wali when his predecessor, Sa'dun al Ruayni was captured by besieging Frankish forces while trying to reach Córdoba to raise help. Harun was chosen as Wali by both the Gothic and Muslim population in the city. However totally besieged, with no food and no hope of help, the city's Gothic magnates forced him to surrender Barcelona to the Frank Louis the Pious on April 3, 801.

The surrender meant the city passed from Muslim control into part of the "Hispanic Marches" of the Carolingian Empire and Bera got the first Count of Barcelona.

Preceded by Sa'dun al Ruayni	Wali of Barcelona; 800–801	Succeeded by -
