= Bernard of Gothia =

9th-century count and margrave of Gothia

Bernard II (in Catalan, Bernat de Gothia) was the count of Barcelona, Girona and margrave of Gothia and Septimania from 865 to 878.

== Origins ==
Bernard was the son of Count Bernard I of Poitiers (814–844) and Bilichilde, daughter of Count Rorgon I of Maine. He was the paternal cousin of Emeno, Count of Angoulême (839–863), who died fighting the Vikings. On his mother's side he was a nephew of Rorgon II of Maine and of the royal Chancellor Gauzlin, abbot of Saint-Germain-des-Prés.

== End of rebellion ==
Bernard was loyal to King Charles the Bald in the civil war that erupted in 851. After the flight of Humfrid in 864 and the death of the other rebels, Charles redistributed the counties and marches of North-East Iberia and Languedoc (March of Gotia). In 864, Bernard was installed in the counties of Auvergne and Autun in central France after Bernard Plantapilosa (son of Bernard of Septimania) was dispossessed of them for rebellion. At that time Auxerre and Nevers were given to Robert the Strong who also received Autun in 865. In 865, Toulouse, Limousin, Pallars, and Ribagorza were entrusted to Bernard, son of Raymond I of Toulouse. Raymond had been dispossessed by Humfrid three years before. Ermengol, Count of Albi, received Rouergue, and Oliba received Carcassonne and probably Razès.

In 865, however, the king redistributed the counties of Auvergne and Autun from Bernard and instead gave him the more strategically important Counties of Barcelona, Ausona, Roussillon, Narbonne, Agde, Béziers, Melgueil, and Nîmes.

King Charles the Child, son of Charles the Bald and thus grandson of Louis the Pious, died on 29 September 866, creating a crisis of succession in Aquitaine. There were many vacancies to be filled in Aquitaine: Ranulph of Poitou, Landri of Saintonge, Emeno of Périgord and Angoulême, Bishop Ralph of Bourges, and Bernard of Auvergne were all either dead or had rebelled.

== Government reforms ==
Wulgrin, a relative of Charles the Bald, was given the counties of Angoulême, Périgord, Agen, and Saintogne, while other family members received their own newly vacated lands: Wullfadus was named Bishop of Bourges, and Effroi (who had been a rebel from 862 to 864, but was now loyal to the king) was made Count of Poitou (however he died very soon afterwards). The nominal independence of the Aquitainian kingdom was restored with the proclamation of Charles' son Louis the Stammerer as King, although real power was retained by a Council of Nobles loyal to Charles. Upon the death of Effroi of Poitiers, the county was given to Bernard of Gothia. At this time, the County of Autun, whose countship had been vacant since the death of Robert the Strong, was returned to Bernard Plantapilosa, who had been reconciled to the king. Auvergne was given to Gari.

Towards 869, Count Solomon of Urgell, Cerdanya, and Conflent, died and within the year. So had Count Otger of Girona and Besalú. In 870, the King assigned Otger's counties to the County of Barcelona (and hence to Bernard of Gothia). Solomon's titles in Urgell and Cerdanya were given to Wilfred the Hairy, eldest son of Sunifred I. The County of Conflent was given to the second son of Sunifred, Miró the Old. The other three sons of Sunifred – Radulf, Sunifred, and Riculf – were not given any titles.

In 872, Charles the Bald gave the government of Aquitaine to his brother-in-law Boso, Count of Lyon and Vienne, and showered him with titles and territories: the County of Berry, Royal Chamberlain, and Magister Ostiariorum. However, Bernard of Gothia and Bernard Plantapilosa were asked to assist in the government of the empire. The County of Auvergne was also given to Plantapilosa.

Bernard II of Toulouse was compensated for not being given greater power by being granted the lands of his enemy Oliba II in Carcassonne and Razès. Shortly after, however, Bernard was assassinated by a vassal of (Oliba's former ally) Bernard Plantapilosa, in August 872. Oliba II was restored to his old possessions and Plantapilosa was given Toulouse and Limousin, but Pallars and Ribagorza escaped his control.

== 876 reforms ==
In 876 Charles the Bald reformed his government in the south of the kingdom again. He placed Provence and Italy under the command of Boso and gave the County of Berry to Bernard of Gothia. A year later, Count Ekhard, who had many lands in Mâcon and Chaunois, died and his domains were also added to those of Boso, who had Provence taken away but retained Italy and his own counties. Autun was given for the second time to Bernard. On 8 October 876 Bernard Plantapilosa was captured by Louis the Younger, King of Saxony, at the Battle of Andernach and was as a result not given any new lands.

Bishop Wullfadus died on 1 April 876 and Frotario was named his successor by Charles. However Bernard opposed the elevation of the new bishop, who would have been a counterweight to the immense power and holdings which Bernard had attained. He did not take arms directly against the King, but sought to oppose the King's directions.

== 877 rebellion ==
877 finally saw an open rebellion with Boso, Hugh the Abbot, Bernard Plantapilosa, and Bernard of Gothia all taking up arms against the King. King Charles however died on 6 October 877 in the middle of the rebellion. The death of the king did not stop the conflict. They fought Charles' appointed successor, Louis the Stammerer, former King of Aquitaine where he had been their overlord. Hincmar, Archbishop of Rheims, subdued Boso, Plantapilosa, and Hugh, leaving Bernard, his brother Emeno, uncle Abbot Gauzlin of Saint Denis, and other uncle Count Gosfrid of Maine to fight alone.

Louis was crowned on 8 December 877. Pope John VIII invoked the Council of Troyes to condemn the rebels for their actions against Bishop Frotario and for the taking of ecclesiastic property.

On 11 September 878, Louis dispossessed Bernard of his honours. Theodoric, his chamberlain, was given Autun; Plantapilosa received Berry and Septimania; Wilfred the Hairy received Barcelona, Ausona, Girona, and Besalú; and Miró the Old received Roussillon.

Bernard continued to resist in Autun until 879, after which he died.

Preceded by Humfrid	Count of Roussillon; 865–878	Succeeded by Miro the Elder
Preceded by Humfrid	Count of Barcelona; 865–878	Succeeded by Wilfred the Hairy
