= Oliba =

Oliba may refer to:

- Oliba I of Carcassonne (died 837), Count of Carcassonne
- Oliba Cabreta (c. 920–990), Count of Cerdanya and Count of Besalú
- Abbot Oliba (c. 971–1046), Count of Berga and Ripoll, abbot of two monasteries and Bishop of Vic
