= Siege of Barcelona (801) =

Part of the Reconquista

- Part of the Reconquista
- Iberian Peninsula c. 814
Date	October 800 – April 4, 801
Location	Barcelona
Result	Carolingian victory
Territorial changes	foundation of the County of Barcelona

Belligerents
Carolingian Empire	Emirate of Córdoba

Commanders and leaders
Louis the Pious; William of Gellone; Rostaing of Girona	Sa'dun al Ruayni; Harun of Barcelona

Strength
"Troops from Aquitaine, Gascony, Burgundy and Septimania"	Unknown

The siege of Barcelona was a military operation by a Carolingian army with the aim of conquering the city of Barcelona, which had been under Muslim control for 80 years. The siege and conquest were part of the expansion of the Marca Hispanica and the constitution of the County of Barcelona by the Carolingians.

== Background ==
In the beginning of the 8th century when the Visigothic Kingdom was conquered by the Muslim troops of the Umayyad Caliphate, Barcelona was taken by the Muslim wali of Al-Andalus, Al-Hurr ibn Abd al-Rahman al-Thaqafi. After the failure of the Muslim invasion of Gaul at the Battles of Toulouse in 721 and Tours in 732, the city was integrated into the Upper March of Al-Andalus.

From 759 onwards the Frankish Kingdom embarked on the conquest of the territories under Muslim domination. The capture of the city of Narbonne by the forces of the Frankish king, Pepin the Short, brought the border to the Pyrenees. The Frankish advance was met with failure in front of Zaragoza, when Charlemagne was forced to retreat and suffered a setback in Roncevaux in the hands of Basque forces allied with the Muslims. But in 785, the rebellion of the inhabitants of Girona, who opened their gates to the Frankish army, pushed back the border and opened the way for a direct attack against Barcelona. Rostaing, a relative of Charlemagne, was appointed head of a vast county which also extended over the ancient pagi of Girona, Empúries and Besalú.

The Emirate of Cordoba was then in a crisis: the Umayyad Emir Al-Hakam I, ascended to the throne in 796 and had to fight against the claims of his uncles, Sulayman and Ubayd-Allah Abu-Marwan, who had rebelled after the death of Hisham I. In 798, the Count of Toulouse and Marquis of Septimania, William of Gellone, was responsible for coordinating operations for the conquest of the Upper March of Al-Andalus. He called an assembly in Toulouse, attended by ambassadors of the King of Asturias, Alfonso II, and Bahlul Ibn Marzuq, a muwallad leader in revolt against Emir Al-Hakam I, who had seized Zaragoza. In 799, Bahlul also seized Huesca after driving out the Banu Salama, a family loyal to Al-Hakam I.

== Siege ==
On August 20, 800, a considerable army was gathered under the authority of the son of Charlemagne, Louis the Pious, named King of Aquitaine by his father in 781. It was made up of troops from Aquitaine, Gascony, Burgundy and Septimania, and was equipped with many siege weapons. The army itself was divided into three corps. The first, commanded by the count of Girona, Rostaing, led the siege, at the foot of the city; the second, led by the counts of Toulouse and Narbonne, William of Gellone and Adhemar, took position between the Muslim-held cities of Lleida and Zaragoza, to oppose the arrival of any Muslim relief troops from Cordoba; the third corps, commanded by Louis the Pious himself, was charged with protecting the Roussillon valley.

The troops of Rostaing arrived under the walls of Barcelona in October 800. The Muslim wali of Barcelona, Sa'dun al Ruayni, seeing that the siege was going to last, left the city to ask for help from Cordoba, but he was discovered and captured by the Frankish troops, and then sent to the court of Aachen where he was condemned to exile. A certain Harun therefore assumed the government of Barcelona.

During the winter of 800–801, the troops of William of Gellone and Adhémar of Narbonne laid siege to Lleida and Huesca, devastating their surroundings. West of the Pyrenees, a revolt of the people of Pamplona against the Muslim occupation served as a diversion. Louis the Pious, was called to come to aid in the final assault on the city and arrived in front of Barcelona in February 801. On April 4, 801, Harun, commander of Barcelona accepted terms to surrender the city, worn out by hunger, deprivation and the constant attacks. The inhabitants of Barcelona then opened the gates of the city to the Carolingian army. Louis entered the city preceded by priests and clergy singing psalms, processing to a church to give thanks to God.

== Aftermath ==
The Carolingians made Barcelona the capital of the County of Barcelona and incorporated it into the Hispanic Marches. Authority was to be exercised in the city by the Count and the Bishop. Bera, son of the Count of Toulouse, William of Gellone, was made the first Count of Barcelona.

The conquered territory however had several weak points, and a vulnerable border that made it poorly defended against possible Muslim attacks from the Upper March, reorganized around Zaragoza and its forward base of Lleida. The border, along the valley of Llobregat, was reinforced, and the Carolingians would then seek to conquer, without success, Tortosa in the following years, and Huesca in 807 and 812.

== Bibliography ==
- d'Abadal i de Vinyals, Ramon (1986). El domini carolingi a Catalunya. Institut d'Estudis Catalans. ISBN 978-84-321-1882-1. (Catalan)
- Fernández, Luis Suárez (1976). Historia de España antigua y media 2. ed.. Ediciones Rialp, Madrid. (Spanish)
- Bramon, Dolors (2001). "3 d'abril de 801: la conquesta cristiana de Barcelona". L'Avenç. 257. (Catalan)
- Augustí, David (2008). Historia Breve de Barcelona. Silex, Barcelona. ISBN 978-84-7737-205-9. (Spanish)
- Faral, Edmond (1932). "Ermold le Noir, Poème sur Louis le Pieux et épitres au roi Pépin". Les classiques de l'histoire de France au Moyen Age. éd. Honoré Champion. (French)
