= Bera, Count of Barcelona =

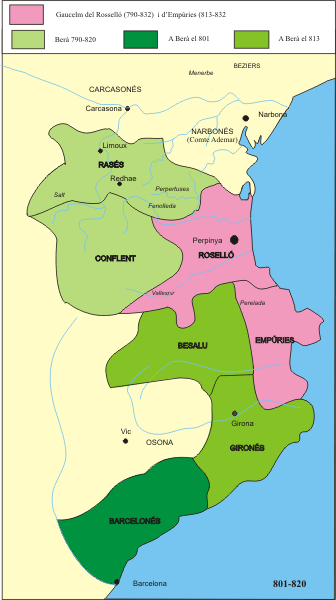
The changing territory of Bera throughout his reign.

Bera (Catalan: Berà) (died 844) was the first count of Barcelona from 801 until his deposition in 820. He was also the count of Razès and Conflent from 790, and the count of Girona and Besalú from 812 (or 813 or 817) until his deposition. In 811, he was witness to the last will and testament of Charlemagne.

== Origins ==
Bera's origins are mostly unknown, although it seems certain that he was a Visigoth. He may have been one of the sons of William of Gellone, Count of Toulouse and cousin of Charlemagne, although this is not supported by William's detailed will from 804. In 790, Bera was given the governorship of the counties of Razès and Conflent, possibly by William. The Counties of Roussillon (with the pagus of Vallespir) and Empúries were given to William's son Gaucelm, whose mother was Gunegunde (Cunegonde), one of William's two wives.

== Background and installation ==
In 796, Sa'dun al Ruayni, the Wali of Barcelona, attempted to break his allegiance to Al-Hakam I, emir of Córdoba. In April 797, he travelled to Aachen and offered to switch the city's allegiance to Charlemagne in exchange for help against Córdoba. Charlemagne summoned an assembly in Toulouse in the spring of 800 which agreed to send his son Louis the Pious to Barcelona.

The army included a number of noble men, among them Rostany of Girona, Adhemar of Narbonne, and William of Toulouse. Sa’dun, however, had changed his mind and the Frankish forces laid siege of Barcelona. Eventually, starving and with Sa’dun having been captured by the Franks trying to reach Caliphate of Cordoba in a plea for help, the city's Visigoth population handed the new Wali Harun over to the Franks with their surrender on Saturday, April 3, 801. Louis entered the city on the following day. Soon after, Bera, who was part of the besieging army, was invested as the first Count of Barcelona.

== Expeditions across the Ebro ==
Bera took part in the Frankish campaigns in 804, 808, and 809 to extend the southern border of the Marca Hispanica to the River Ebro which was felt to be a natural defendable barrier between the two empires. This was despite his Visigoth mother who urged him to keep peace with the Muslims States to the south and west.

=== First expedition ===
In 804, Louis the Pious led an army to Tarragona. At Santa Coloma, the army divided into two. Louis marched his division straight for Tortosa while the other commanded by Bera, Adhemar, and Borrell of Ausona covered Louis' western flank and attacked Tortosa from the south. Bera turned his army around after they had crossed the River Ebro where it meets the Cinca. The army went as far as Vila Rubea before being forced to turn back to Vallis Ibana (this is possibly modern Vallibona), near Morella. They then rejoined the troops commanded by Louis's which has unsuccessfully undertaken a siege of Tortosa. The army then turned north and returned to Barcelona.

=== Second and third expeditions ===
In 808, Charlemagne sent his legate Ingobert to Toulouse to meet Louis and prepare for another expedition south. The plan was to follow the same tactics as in 804. The "Astronomer", author of the Vita Hludovici, writes that the forces of Bera and Adhemar crossed the Ebro in boats while their horses swam across. However, the horse dung was swept by the current past Tortosa which alerted the town's garrison. The Wali of the city attacked Bera, who was forced to retreat north again.

In 809, Louis led his last expedition as King of Aquitaine into the Marca. This time equipped with siege engines, Tortosa was besieged for forty days by Frankish and troops from the Marca (under Bera). The new Emir of Cordoba, Abd ar-Rahman II, however met the besiegers with an army. The Moorish chronicler Al Maqqari records a Muslim victory, while Astronomus simply states that the besieged offered Louis's the keys to the city and, satisfied, the King of Aquitaine lifted his siege and left.

== First truce ==
It is probable that Bera was the strongest promoter of peace with Córdoba. This would allow him to consolidate his power in his new possessions. Advised by his mother, and supported by the city's residents keen for continued peaceful relations with the nearby Muslim states, Bera sought to institute a truce. The Frankish court eventually signed a three-year peace treaty with the Caliphate of Córdoba in 812.

Bera's father died on 18 May 812 and the Counties of Razès and Conflent passed to him. Following his father's example, Bera gave governorship of the counties to his son Guillemundus.

In 812, Bera also travelled to the Imperial Court in Aachen with several other Counts of the region: Adhemar of Narbonne, Gaucelm of Roussillon, Odilo of Girona, Guiscafred of Carcassonne, Ermengar of Empúries, Laibulf of Provence, and Erlin of Béziers. Several Visigoth (hispani) nobles had accused the Counts of Frankish paternity and of imposing unjust tributes and excises on their lands. The Magnates defence was unsuccessful and Charlemagne decided in favour of the claimants

== Second truce and downfall ==
Around 813, Count Odilo of Girona and Besalú died and these Counties passed to Bera.

In 815, the truce with the Caliphate was broken and the war with the Muslims resumed. The Muslim army under the command of Ubayd Allah Abu Marwan, uncle of the Emir Al-Hakam I, attacked Barcelona. However, the attack was beaten back by a mercenary Visigothic army. This victory increased the prestige of Bera, whose relationships with the local Visigoth nobility improved. In November 816, the Wali of Zaragoza travelled to Aachen and negotiated a new three-year truce, which was finally concluded in February 817.

However, despite attempts to secure alliances in Pamplona, the Basques remained allied to the Banu Qasi family based in the valley of the River Ebro. They continued to defy Frankish authority, as did Aragón, where the Count was allied with the Basques. Gaucelm and his brother Bernard both claimed that the truce promoted by Bera was against the Empire's best interests and inhibited attempts to force the Basques and Aragón to recognise themselves as vassals of the Empire.

In February 820, a general assembly was held in Aachen at which Bera was in attendance. Gaucelm sent his Visigoth lieutenant Sanila in his place, who accused Bera of infidelity and perfidy. The litigation, as was customary in that era, was settled by a duel in the palace. Bera was defeated by Sanila and deprived of his counties. However Emperor Louis I, who did not believe the Count was a traitor, commuted the death penalty carried by the defeat into an exile in Rouen. He remained there until his death in 844. He was succeeded as Count of Barcelona by Rampon.

New title	Count of Barcelona; 801–820	Succeeded by Rampon
