= Duoda Women's Research Centre =

Spanish research centre

Coordinates: 41°23′5.06″N 2°6′55.36″E

The Duoda Women's Research Centre is an interdisciplinary research center internationally recognized for research, teaching and publications.

The center is on located at Edifici Florensa, a building in the Campus Diagonal Sur of the University of Barcelona.

== History ==
The name Duoda was taken from a ninth-century Barcelona countess, Dhuoda, famous for the education manual Liber Manualis she wrote for her sons, who were taken from her. Duoda began as a Centre for Historical Research on Women in 1982, founded by women lecturers and students at the university who wanted to have a women's space within it.

In 1991 it took on the name of Duoda and over time evolved from its historical focus to one encompassing an interdisciplinary scope. It started to offer an MA programme in Women's Studies in 1998 and an Online MA in the Studies of Sexual Difference in 2000. These two programmes, after the Bologna agreement, were merged into one programme that can be followed in different forms.

== Sexual differences as thought and politics ==
In Spain, Duoda has been central to the introduction of the thinking and politics of sexual differences undertaken by two important and inter-related Italian groups, the Milan Women's Bookstore Collective and Diotima, the Women's Philosophical Community at the University of Verona. The work and evolution of these two groups was explained in their book, No credere di avere dei diriti, translated into English as,

The thinking and politics of sexual differences emerged in the late 1960s - in part triggered by Luce Irigaray. Her thesis, Speculum, posed a critique of western cultural and philosophical structures and beliefs. She proposed moving beyond equality towards wider freedoms.

The Italian groups and Duoda are committed to exploring politics rooted in sexual differences. They have worked on topics such as affidamento, the politics of desire, female authority (as opposed to power), and the politics of setting out from the self.

Lisa Muraro authored The Symbolic Order of the Mother. It emphasizes the relationships between women, on giving them significance and on language. It is grounded in the need to think through sexual differences. It enabled a different kind of perception of politics to develop among those who find sense in it.

== Virtual library ==
Duoda recently created a virtual library, to hold texts and documents in various languages. Currently the texts are available in Spanish and Catalan.
