= Guisclafred of Carcassonne =

Count of Carcassonne from 810

Guisclafred (died circa 821) was the Count of Carcassonne from 810. He was the eldest son and successor of Bello of Carcassonne. His brothers were Sunyer I of Ampurias, Sunifred I of Barcelona, and Oliba I of Carcassonne.

When Bello died, his sons partitioned his domains between them, according to the eldest the chief city of Carcassonne. He was succeeded after a short reign by his brother Oliba.

Preceded by Bello	Count of Carcassonne; 810–821	Succeeded by Oliba I
