= Oliba I of Carcassonne =

Oliba I of Carcassonne (died 837) was a count of Carcassonne.

He was the son of Bello of Carcassonne, and brother (or cousin) of Sunifred I of Barcelona. He succeeded to the county of Carcassonne (as well as to the county of Razès) after his brother Guisclafred had died without heirs.

Oliba married to Elmetruda and Richelda, with whom he had three sons: Oliba II, Sunifred (who was abbot of Lagrasse) and Acfred.

After his death the county of Carcassonne was ruled by Bernard of Septimania.

Preceded by Guisclafred	Count of Carcassonne; 821–837	Succeeded by Bernard of Septimania
