= Sa'dun al-Ruayni =

Sa'dun al-Ruayni (Arabic: سعدون الرعيني) was Governor, or Wali, of Barcelona from 792 to 801 and the penultimate Muslim ruler of the city.

He was appointed successor to Matruh ben Sulayman al-Arabi in circa 792 by the Emir of Córdoba, Hisham. However, in 796 he led a revolt against the Emir; in April 797 he travelled to Aachen and offered Charlemagne the city's loyalty in exchange for the empire's help against Córdoba.

Charlemagne summoned an assembly in Toulouse in the spring of the 800 which agreed to send an expedition led by his son Louis the Pious to Barcelona. The army included several notable commanders including Rostany, Count of Girona; Ademar, Count of Narbonne; and William of Gellone, Count of Toulouse (cousin of Charlemagne). However, on arriving at Barcelona, Sa'dun, who had in the meantime been reconciled to the Caliphate, refused to open the city gates. The Frankish forces then began a long siege in the autumn of 800. Sa'dun attempted to escape in order to raise help from Córdoba, but was captured by the besieging army. He was replaced as governor by Harun of Barcelona, however the siege was successful and Harun surrendered the city and its starving population on Saturday, April 3, 801. Louis I entered the city on the following day (April 4, 801). Sa'dun was brought before Charlemagne in the summer of 801 and condemned to exile.

Preceded by Matruh al-Arabi	Wali of Barcelona; 792–800	Succeeded by Harun of Barcelona
