= Leibulf of Provence =

Leibulf, Leybulf, or Letibulf was the Count of Provence in the early ninth century. Along with Gaucelm, who ruled Septimania, and Bera, who ruled Catalonia, he was one of the three most important magnates in the south during the early reign of Louis the Pious, during which the emperor reorganised that territory's government.

Leibulf's origins are unknown, though the probability is high that he was a native of Provence where he held ex rebus proprietas (allodial land) in Arles. His rise to power occurred in the last years of the reign of Charlemagne (768 – 814), who may have granted him many of the honores he held. Along with Bera's Goths and Duke Sancho I's Gascons, he led a contingent of Provençals on Louis the Pious' expedition against Barcelona in 801 – 802.

Leibulf was a patron of the monastery of Lérins. He exchanged some estates with Noton, Archbishop of Arles. He died in 829 (after 16 March, date of his last donation to Lérins) and Bernard of Septimania was given his honores. He was probably succeeded in Provence by the dux Guerin. He left a wife named Oda who had likewise patronised Lérins.

== Sources ==
- Lewis, Archibald R. The Development of Southern French and Catalan Society, 718–1050. University of Texas Press: Austin, 1965.
- Février, P. "La donation faite à Lérins par le comte Leibulfe." Provence Historique, Vol. VI. 1956.
