= Bello of Carcassonne =

Bello (c. 755 – 810) was Count of Carcassonne from 790 until his death. He was the founder of the Bellonid Dynasty of Carcassonne and Razès which reached its apex in Wilfred the Hairy, progenitor of the House of Barcelona.

Bello married Ermentrude de Ampurias, several children have been suggested for him:

- Guisclafred, his successor in Carcassonne
- Oliba I, Count of Carcassonne and Razès
- Sunyer I, Count of Empúries
- Sunifred I, Count of Barcelona - may have been his son or possibly son-in-law. He is mentioned to be the brother of Sunyer I; might have been his brother-in-law.
- Argila of Razès, Count of Carcassonne and Razès
- Bera of Barcelona, Count of Carcassonne and Razès, Count of Barcelona, Girona, Ausona, Empúries

Argila and Bera are less likely to have been sons of Bello. Bera is also noted to be the son of William of Gellone, but that is also unlikely based on references detailing William's inheritance.

Preceded by New title	Count of Carcassonne; 790 – 810	Succeeded by Guisclafred
