= Fulcrad =

French aristocrat

Fulcrad was the count of Arles in the middle of the ninth century, who was given military command over the other counts of the Provençal country and took the title of duke (Latin dux). His recorded activity took place after the treaty of Verdun (843), when Provence lay in the south of the kingdom of Middle Francia ruled by the Emperor Lothair I. As the leading man in Provence he seems to have succeeded Warin.

In 845 Fulcrad led the counts of Provence in revolt against Lothair. The emperor came down and forced him to surrender. The northern Annals of Saint-Bertin record that "Count Fulcrad and the other Provençals failed to usurp all power in Provence from Lothair". The German Annals of Fulda give Fulcrad the title of duke: "Lothair accepted the surrender of the duke of Arles and the rest of the counts of the party planning to rebel and ordered Provence according to his own wishes." Fulcrad was reconciled to the emperor by the next year (846), when he accompanied Lothair on a military expedition against the Saracens of Italy.

Fulcrad's revolt took place at a time when Provence was increasingly under attack from foreign quarters. In 842 Saracens attacked Marseille and Arles, and in 848 Marseille was assaulted by Byzantine (Greek) pirates. In 859 Arles was fortified against Saracen attacks. In 859–60 Provence was ravaged by the Vikings under Hastein and Björn Ironside.

After Lothair's death in 855, Middle Francia was divided between his sons. Charles, the youngest, received Provence and the lands to its immediate north. His kingdom is usually called the "Kingdom of Provence", although it was much more extensive than Fulcrad's dukedom. The southern part of Charles's kingdom—Provence proper—is poorly documented in this period.

Fulcrad attended the public assembly at Sermorens (near Voiron) that probably took place between 858 and 860 (prior to the death of Bishop Ebbo of Grenoble). Fulcrad's preeminence among the counts of Provence is indicated by his place in the surviving list of attendants: second after the regent of the kingdom, Girard of Roussillon. In a royal diploma of 25 August 862, Fulcrad appears as Charles's special representative (ambasciator) to the church of Orange when the king donated a village in the county of Orange to the church. The count of Orange at the time was Aldric, who also participated in Lothair's Italian expedition in 846.

== Sources ==
- Lewis, Archibald R. (1965). The Development of Southern French and Catalan Society, 718–1050. Austin: University of Texas Press.
- Poupardin, René (1901). Le royaume de Provence sous les Carolingiens (855–933?). Paris: É. Bouillon.
- Reuter, Timothy (1992). The Annals of Fulda. Manchester Medieval series, Ninth-Century Histories. Vol. II. Manchester: Manchester University Press.
