= Ekkehard, Count of Hesbaye =

9th-century European noble

Ekkehard (Eggebard) (d. 844), Count of Hesbaye, possibly son of Nibelung, Count of the Vexin, and grandson of Childebrand I of Herstal. Ekkehard was a vassal of Louis the Pious. Ekkehard apparently assumed the title of Count of Hesbaye upon the death of Robert II, although the circumstances of this transition are unknown. Ekkehard may be related to Count Meginhare.

In 834, Louis was imprisoned by his son Lothair, and Ekkehard attempted to procure the release of the emperor. Louis turned the loyal barons of Austrasia and Saxony against Lothair, who fled to Burgundy. Louis was restored the next year, on 1 March 834. Ekkehard and two of his two sons were killed supporting Charles the Bald in the Battle of Toulouse in 844, fighting Pepin II of Aquitaine.
