= Rostany =

Rostaing (Latin Rostagnus), commonly known as Rostany in Catalan, was the first Count of Girona (785-801), ruling over the earliest-established of the Catalan Counties which formed the Marca Hispanica. A Frankish noble, he was elevated to Count of Girona at the time of Charlemagne. In the Spring of 800 he led his knights with Louis the Pious to take part in the campaign culminating in the siege and fall of Barcelona, removing the last Arab ruler of the city Sa'dun al Ruayni. Sources give the next Count of Girona commencing his rule in 811. So the exact date of Rostany's death and his relationship, if any, to his successor are ambiguous.Rostani is the title of Sayyid Sharif Rustam bin Saad bin Yaqoub bin Saad bin Yaqoub bin Muhammad Amin bin Saad bin Yaqoub bin Saad bin Ghaleb al-Ridhawi al-Qummi. Rustam is the father of Sayyid Sharif Mohsen al-Hassuna, the grandfather of the Sayyids al-Hassuna.
