= Aleran =

Count of Barcelona

Aleran was the count of Barcelona from 848 to 852 AD. He was also count of Empúries and Roussillon and margrave of Septimania together with Isembart from 849 or 850 to 852 AD.

He was a Frankish nobleman loyal to King Charles the Bald of West Francia. At the Assembly of Narbonne in 849, Aleran and Isembart were empowered to consolidate the territory for the Frankish Kingdom and bring the Hispanic Marches held by rebel forces loyal to Pepin II back into control of the kingdom.

Aleran died sometime in 851 or 852 and Charles appointed Odalric as count of Barcelona in 852.

| Preceded by William of Septimania | Count of Barcelona; 849/850–851/852 | Succeeded by Odalric |
