= Sanila (lieutenant) =

Gothic lieutenant

Sanila (?800–834) was a Gothic magnate, lieutenant of the count Gaucelm of Rosselló, Empúries, Conflent and Rasez. What is known of his life is linked to Gaucelm. Sanila was his staunch lieutenant. The most notable surviving recorded incident about him was in 820, when Sanila beat the count Berà in a judicial duel (see Berà), which resulted in Berà losing his lands and being exiled, although Gaucelm did not immediately gain power over his estates as planned.

Gaucelm and Sanila defended Chalon-sur-Saône against the assault of Lothar in 834. The city was taken and Gaucelm and Sanila were captured and executed.
