= Solomon of Urgell =

Solomon (Catalan: 'Salomó') (died c. 869) was the count of Urgell and Cerdanya from 848 and of Conflent from 860 to his death.

According to the historian Ramon d'Abadal i de Vinyals, Solomon recognised the succession of the children of his possible relative, Sunifred I, Count of Barcelona, on the latter's death in 848, and acted as their defender. He was ratified as count of Urgel and Cerdanya at the Assembly of Narbonne in October 849.

Solomon went on a trip to Córdoba in 863 to request the return of the relics of Saint Vincent, which were then in the possession of the wali of Zaragoza. Abadal supposes that it was more probably a diplomatic mission to secure the neutrality or friendship of the caliph during the rebellion of Humphrey, Count of Barcelona, from 862 to 864.

Solomon last appears in 868 and Wilfred the Hairy is mentioned as count in 870, thus his death is set between those years.

Preceded by Sunifred I	Count of Urgell; 849–869	Succeeded by Wilfred I
Preceded by Sunifred I	Count of Cerdagne; 849–869	Succeeded by Wilfred I
