= Bernard of Septimania =

9th-century Frankish nobleman

Bernard (or Bernat) of Septimania (795–844), son of William of Gellone and cousin of Charlemagne, was the Duke of Septimania and Count of Barcelona from 826 to 832 and again from 835 until his execution, and also Count of Carcassonne from 837. He was appointed to succeed the third Count of Barcelona, Rampon. During his career, Bernard was one of the closest counsellors of the Emperor Louis the Pious, a leading proponent of the war against the Moors, and was an opponent of the interests of the local Visigothic nobility in Iberia.

== Title ==
Bernard was indisputably a count (comes) of Barcelona and several other counties over the course of his long career. He also appears in the chronicles with the title duke (dux), though the extent to which this was a military designation is obscure. He is sometimes retrospectively referred to by historians as a margrave (marchio). His name and title as they appear in several primary sources were:

- Bernhardus comes Barcinonensis ("Bernard, Count of Barcelona")
- duce Bernhardo ("Duke Bernard")
- præfatus Bernardus ("Prefect Bernard")
- Bernhardum Barcenonensium ducem ("Bernard, Duke of Barcelona")
- Bernardus comes marcæ Hispanicæ ("Bernard, Count of the Hispanic March")
- Bernardo comiti Tolosano ("Bernard, Count of Toulouse")

== Count of Barcelona ==
Bernard is first attested in historical records as one of four sons in a document of his father's dating to 14 December 804 concerning the foundation of the monastery of Gellone. (Note: There are two extant versions of this charter, and one is dated to 15 December and does not mention Bernard.)

Bernard must have inherited land in the area around Toulouse, from which he expanded his power to become count around 826. He first attracted the attention of higher nobility by quelling the local revolt of a nobleman named Aisso, who was perhaps a Visigothic lieutenant of the deposed Bera, Count of Barcelona. (Note: Others hypothesise that the name "Aisso" is a corruption of the Arabic Aysun, which was the name of the son of Sulayman al-Arabi, formerly imprisoned in Aachen, but who had escaped from captivity to the Hispanic March and established himself in the region of Vic.) The garrisons of the castles in the area, who had favored Bera, joined Aisso in a revolt against the new count. Only the castle of Roda de Ter, in the county of Ausona, resisted and was subsequently destroyed by Aisso. From his newly occupied territory, Aisso attacked the county of Cerdanya and the region of the Vallès. The young count Bernard requested and received some help from the Emperor, as well as that of some local hispani (probably Gothic noblemen). To counter these reinforcements, Aisso sent his brother to request help from Abd ar-Rahman II, Emir of Córdoba, the only potential ally powerful enough to threaten the Franks. Abd ar-Rahman sent the general Ubayd Allah Abu Marwan to Zaragoza in May 827, from whence he invaded the territory of Barcelona, reaching the city itself in the summer. He besieged it and ransacked its environs, but failed to take it.

When the Emperor learned of these raids, he ordered his second son, Pepin, then King of Aquitaine, and the counts Hugh of Tours and Matfrid of Orléans to recruit an army against the Muslims, but recruitment was slow. By the time the army arrived, Abu Marwan had already returned to Muslim territory, taking Aisso and his followers with him (late 827).

This reprieve, seen as a victory, greatly increased Bernard's prestige. Though the ravaged county of Ausona, a dependency of Barcelona, remained depopulated into the mid-ninth century, its ruin was attributed to the late arrival of Hugh and Matfrid. Both counts were dispossessed of their counties at the Assembly of Aachen in 828. At that assembly, Orléans was granted to Odo and Bernard's brother Gaucelm received the fiefs of Conflent and Razes. As Leibulf of Provence had died in the spring, his vast dominions—Narbonne, Béziers, Agde, Melgueil, Nîmes, and probably Uzès—were assigned to Bernard. From this wide collection of honores in Septimania, Bernard took the title "Duke of Septimania". In another assembly, at Ingelheim in June, a reprisal raid into Cordoban territory was considered, but although an army was gathered in Thionville, it did not enter the lands controlled by Bernard as the risk of Muslim raiding seemed to have declined.

== Court career ==
In August 829, the Emperor sent his son Lothair to Pavia to wear the Iron Crown. Louis summoned Bernard to replace his son at court, granting him the title of camerarius or Chamberlain and the custody of the young Charles, then just Duke of Alsace, Alemannia, and Rhaetia, but later destined to be king of West Francia. Bernard delegated the government of his counties to his brother Gaucelm, who thereupon took the title marchio or margrave.

After only a few months at court, Bernard had made many enemies. Indeed, he was the prime catalyst for the revolt of Lothair the following year. Thegan of Trier, in his Gesta Hludowici, recorded that Bernard was accused of having an illicit relationship with Empress Judith of Bavaria, but considered these rumours to be lies. Nevertheless, these rumours provoked a riot in the army gathered at Rennes to fight the Bretons in April 830. His life under threat, as the three elder children of Louis supported the opposition against him, Bernard abandoned the court and, according to the Annales Bertiniani, returned to Barcelona. His brother, Eribert, who had remained at court, was banished. Bernard was deprived of the county of Autun which he had sometime before been granted.

At an assembly in Nijmegen in October 830, the Emperor recovered his authority after a brief civil war with his sons. Subsequently, in another assembly at Aachen in February 831, he proceeded to divide the Empire, giving Gothia to Charles, although the division would not be effective until his death. Bernard attempted to regain favour with Judith and Charles, but they avoided renewing relations with him after his fall from grace. At the Assembly of Thionville in October 831, Bernard spoke personally with the Emperor, but could not regain his previous position at court. In response Bernard reversed his previous loyalties and sided with the Emperor's enemies.

== Civil war of 831–832 ==
In November 831, Pepin of Aquitaine revolted against his father. While Berengar the Wise, Count of Toulouse, advised him against such a course of action, Bernard encouraged it. In early 832 Louis the Pious began the campaign against his rebellious son. Berengar, loyal to the Emperor, invaded Bernard's honores and took Roussillon (with Vallespir) and probably also Razes and Conflent. By 2 February, Berengar was already in Elna.

Ultimately, the successive victories of the imperial forces compelled Pepin and Bernard to appear before the Emperor in October 832. Pepin was dispossessed of his kingdom and sent as prisoner to Trier, having ceded all his territories to his half-brother Charles. Bernard was accused of infidelity and dismissed from all his offices and dispossessed of all his honores in Septimania and Gothia, which were given to Berengar. His brother Gaucelm was probably also dispossessed, but for a time he remained in possession of the County of Empúries, ignoring his dismissal.

== Civil war of 833–834 ==
In 833, however, Lothair revolted. Pepin, with Bernard and Gaucelm, remained loyal to Louis this time. After defeating Lothair's forces and returning the emperor to power on 1 March 834, Bernard requested the return of his honores, citing the loss of men he had sustained for the emperor's cause. However, Berengar was still in legal possession. The Emperor hesitated over his decision, but in June 835 he summoned Bernard and Berengar to an Assembly in Cremieux, near Lyon, where he would deliver a verdict. Berengar died unexpectedly on the way and, freed of obstacles, the Emperor gave Septimania and its counties and Toulouse to Bernard. The only territories not returned were Empúries and Roussillon, which had already been granted to Sunyer I and Alaric, respectively, and Urgell and Cerdanya, which had been detached from Toulouse by the usurper Aznar I Galíndez. Sunifred, brother of Oliba I of Carcassonne, was assigned to expel him.

Bernard returned to his domain, where the Goth population that had supported Bera and then Berengar still opposed him. Ten complaints were presented against him at the Assembly of Quierzy-sur-Oise in September 838. From 841, he was often absent from his lands, participating in the struggles of the Empire, and the counties were administered by their respective viscounts.

== Reign of Charles the Bald ==
Bernard avoided participating in the Battle of Fontenay-en-Puisaye (25 June 841), where Charles the Bald and Louis the German defeated their brother Lothair, who retreated to the south with his army. Bernard remained outside the battle awaiting its result, upon which he sent his son William to offer homage to Charles the Bald and to promise him that his father would obtain the submission of Pepin II, the rebellious son of Pepin, who was claiming to rule Aquitaine. It seems that Bernard had no intention of keeping this last promise.

During Charles the Bald's campaign in Aquitaine (842), he decided to punish Bernard, dispossessing him of the county of Toulouse in favor of Acfred (July). Bernard, however, refused to accept the decision and revolted, openly allying himself to Pepin II and expelling Acfred from Toulouse (843). Charles responded by sending the dux Guerin of Provence, who in 842 directed the campaign in Aquitaine, against Septimania. Various other events—renewed Viking invasions and Breton raids—compelled an end to the internal civil struggles afflicting the Empire and, in August 843, the Treaty of Verdun was signed between the three brothers: Charles, Louis, and Lothair. Septimania and Gothia were left in the hands of Charles the Bald. The county of Uzès, where Bernard still possessed estates, was assigned to Lothair. Furthermore, the county of Autun, which had long been lost to Bernard, and to which his son had renewed a claim, was given to Guerin.

In 844 Charles the Bald returned to Aquitaine with the objective of forcing Pepin II to submit and conquering Toulouse. During the Battle of Toulouse of 844, Bernard of Septimania was captured, either by the royal forces during the assault on Toulouse or, according to French historian Pierre Andoque, the year before by Guerin in Uzès. Andoque maintains that in 844 he was merely brought before Charles during his campaign through Aquitaine. One way or the other, in May 844 Bernard was presented to Charles, who ordered his execution.

The following month, Pepin II and Bernard's son William dealt a severe blow to Charles in the Angoumois on 14 June. Bernard's honores were given to Sunifred, who had been tasked previously with subduing Aznar in Aragon.

Bernard married Dhuoda, perhaps daughter of Sancho I of Gascony, on 29 June 824 in Aachen. By her he had two sons, the aforementioned William of Septimania and another named Bernard Plantapilosa.

== See also ==
- Regnum francorum

== Sources ==
- Lewis, Archibald R. The Development of Southern French and Catalan Society, 718–1050. University of Texas Press: Austin, 1965.
- Thomassy, R. "Critique des deux chartes de foundation de l'abbaye de Saint-Guillem-du-Désert," Bibliothèque de l'Ecole des Chartes, Series 1, Volume II (Paris, 1840–1844).
- Hummer, Hans J. Politics and Power in Early Medieval Europe: Alsace and the Frankish Realm 600–1000. Cambridge University Press: 2005.
- Flodoard. Historia Remensis Ecclesiæ'. III, XXVI, MGH SS XXXVI.
- Thegan of Trier. Gesta Hludowici. 36, MGH SS II, p. 597.
- Annales Xantenses. MGH SS II, p. 227.
- Annales Fuldenses (Gesta quorundam regum Francorum), ed. G.H. Pertz, Annales et chronica aevi Carolini. MGH Scriptores 1. Hanover, 1826. 337–415.

Preceded by Rampon	Count of Barcelona; 826–832	Succeeded by Berengar
Preceded by Berengar	Count of Barcelona; 835–844	Succeeded by Sunifred I
Preceded by Oliba I	Count of Carcassonne; 837–844	Succeeded by Argila
