= William of Septimania =

Count of Toulouse and Barcelona (826–850)

William of Septimania (29 November 826 – 850) was the son of Bernard and Dhuoda. He was the count of Toulouse from 844 and count of Barcelona from 848.

The sources for his life are primarily the Annales Bertiniani and the Chronica Fontanellensis, while his mother wrote an educational instruction book called the Liber Manualis for him and his brother sometime before February 842.

William was initially sent to the court of his uncle, Theodoric of Autun, who died around 830, and left the child in the charge of Louis the Pious, then reigning emperor. When Louis died in June 840, custody of the youth passed to Charles the Bald of West Francia. Throughout most of this time, William lived in Uzès, with frequent stays with his father in Toulouse. On 25 June 841, the same day as the Battle of Fontenoy, William petitioned Charles the Bald for investiture of the benefices of his godfather Theodoric in Burgundy. This was granted and the young William was invited to live at the royal palace, being promised investiture with the county of Autun in the future. When, however, Guerin of Provence was installed in Autun, dissension ripped apart the court.

William's father was dispossessed of his benefices, offices, and titles in July 842 and they were not passed to William. In May 844, his father was executed and William promptly joined the rebellion then under way in Aquitaine led by Pepin II. In June, he fought in the Battle of Angoumois. Pepin invested him with Toulouse, while Charles installed Fredelo there. It has been hypothesised that William was also the same person as the count of Bordeaux and possible duke of Gascony appointed by Pepin in 845. At that time, the Vikings invaded Aquitaine and ravaged as far as Limoges. As Ghilyam ibn Burbat ibn Ghilyam, he and several allies are said by chronicler Ibn Hayyan to have visited Córdoba in 846, seeking assistance from Abd al-Rahman II against Charles. In 847, Vikings again besieged Bordeaux, and when William came to the city's relief he was captured. Finally liberated in 848 through an accord signed by Pepin, William returned to Gothia to lead the ongoing revolt there.

In that year, William entered Barcelona and Empúries and assumed authority there, "more by cunning and lies than by force of arms," according to the chroniclers. It has been supposed that Sunifred I of Barcelona died a natural death and Charles the Bald nominated Aleran to succeed him, but William, not recognising this, laid claim to the counties of Sunifred as the heir of Bernard. He asserted these rights and was recognised in the counties themselves. However, the sudden disappearance of Sunyer I of Empúries and Bera II of Conflent has led some scholars to posit an act of treachery (coup d'état) to secure his claimed inheritance. Following his successes, William wrote a letter of thanks to Abd al-Rahman, who in turn urged his lords on the Upper March to assist and support the Toulousain count, who again visited the Córdoban court.

In summer 849, when Charles the Bald decided to attack Aquitaine, Fredelo welcomed him with open gates at Toulouse and the king reconfirmed Fredelo's investiture. Pepin fled in haste and Charles marched to Narbonne, where he named Aleran as count in Barcelona, Empúries, and Roussillon and as Margrave of Septimania. He granted Wilfred the counties of Girona and Besalú, and Solomon those of Cerdanya, Urgell, and Conflent. Aleran, who was possibly also the count of Troyes and son of William I of Blois, appointed an adjunct, Isembard, son of Guerin of Provence, given that he had to guard against William's territorial aspirations. In the end, Charles' nominations had little trouble taking up their charges.

In February 850, when Charles the Bald marched into Aquitaine and the nobles en masse switched allegiance to Pepin II, Sancho II Sánchez of Gascony took control of Bordeaux, and William marched over Catalonia. Charles sent reinforcements and William was defeated in battle. William fled to Barcelona, where he was caught and killed by the royal partisans. William was reportedly still in possession of his mother's Manual when he died. In Barcelona, Sancho and his brother-in-law Emenon were captured by Musa ibn Musa of the Banu Qasi. In 851, the Moors occupied Barcelona, decimating the population. In September 852, Sancho was released by a treaty.

== Notes ==
=== Sources ===
- Lewis, Archibald R. (1965). The Development of Southern French and Catalan Society, 718–1050. Austin, TX: University of Texas Press.

Preceded by Sunifred I	Count of Barcelona; 848–850	Succeeded by Aleran
