= Dhuoda =

Frankish writer

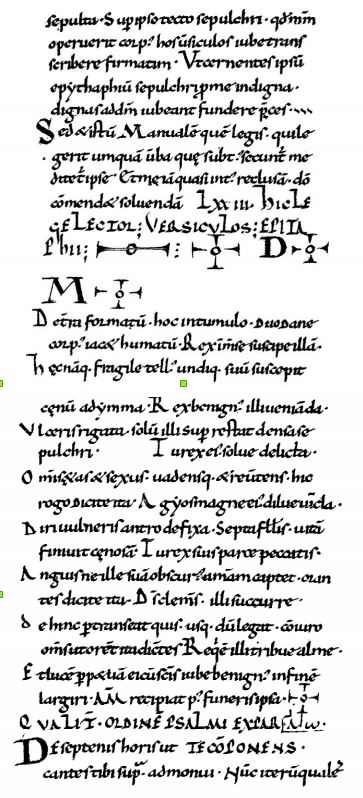
Page from the Liber Manualis (end of Book 10, beginning of Book 11)

Dhuoda (fl. AD 824–844) was a Frankish writer, as well as Duchess consort of Septimania and Countess consort of Barcelona. She was the author of the Liber Manualis, a handbook written for her eldest son, William of Septimania.

== Life ==
Dhuoda, author of the Liber Manualis, was a significant Carolingian woman and writer. Earlier scholarship suggested that Dhuoda may have come from a powerful Austrasian family connected to Aachen. However, the Liber Manualis does not provide information about her natal lineage, and more recent scholarship argues that her ancestry remains uncertain. It has been speculated that her unusual name is an attempt to render the Basque name Toda, and that she may have been daughter of Sancho I, Duke of Gascony. She married Bernard, Duke of Septimania, at the Carolingian capital of Aachen in 824. The specific date of the wedding is contested. Some believe that it fell on the feast of Saints Peter and Paul, which was the 24th of June, while others believe the date to be the 29th of June. Her husband Bernard was the son of William of Gellone, Duke of Toulouse and Charlemagne's cousin, who was later named the patron saint of knights. Bernard was a Count of Barcelona and during their marriage he was advisor to Emperor Louis and protector of the empress Judith of Bavaria, as well as being appointed to the office of chamberlain. There were reports of Judith and Bernard being guilty of adultery, sorcery, and attempted assassination. When Bernard broke his alliance with Charles the Bald, he took control of Toulouse but was later captured and decapitated.

It is possible that Dhuoda was educated at a religious institution or while at court.

Their first son, William of Septimania, was born on 29 November 826, and the second, Bernard Plantapilosa, on 22 March 841. Her husband Bernard’s involvement in the dynastic conflict, including the civil war of the 830s and in the Battle of Fontenoy in 841, led to their elder son, William, being sent to Charles the Bald as a political hostage. While he was away, Dhuoda began to write her handbook for him. Her youngest son was taken from her shortly after birth by his father Bernard and the Bishop of Uzès in order to keep him safe. Bernard was at court in Aachen while Dhuoda remained exiled in Uzès, where she experienced financial and personal hardship. Dhuoda herself mentions very little of him during this time. According to Dhuoda, she spent this time struggling to maintain her husband's authority in their land and on the border of Francia. She fulfilled the administrative and military responsibilities of Frankish Septimania on Louis the Pious' behalf. One scholar has suggested that a daughter was born in 844, as one chronicler reports the marriage of William's sister.

Although Dhuoda was married to the most prominent Frankish magistrate at the time, she is not mentioned in any contemporary works from that period except her own. What little we know of her life comes from her book, the Liber Manualis, or Manual, which Dhuoda wrote for her elder son, William, between 841 and 843. It is known to have been sent to William in 843. It was a work written when Dhuoda had been separated from both her husband and her two sons, the victim of the conflicting ambitions of Charlemagne's descendants.

=== Historical Context ===
Dhuoda lived and wrote amidst a turbulent period of Frankish history, in which various noble factions within the region warred over territory and sovereignty.

Emperor Louis the Pious, son of Charlemagne, died in 840. His three sons (Lothair, Louis the German, and Charles the Bald) fought over the partition of the empire. Eventually they divided Europe at the Treaty of Verdun. Louis would hold onto authority over the eastern Franks, Charles established himself in the west, and Lothar received territory that cut north to south from the Low Countries to Italy.

Dhuoda wrote that the Carolingian house's enmity had started over ten years before when the emperor's sons started to rebel against their father's authority. The struggle for power embroiled the nobility with the heirs, including her husband, who held a great amount of power as the ruler of Septimania. Because of this power, Bernard's son, William, was held hostage at the court of Charles the Bald, while their other son Bernard lived with his father in Aquitaine.

Dhuoda's own family would be deeply impacted by the ongoing violence. Her husband, Bernard, was condemned for rebellion and executed in 844. Of her sons, William was killed in 850, Bernard in 885.

== Liber Manualis ==
Dhuoda is arguably best known for writing the Liber Manualis. The work serves as a practical moral handbook to help guide her sons in matters of piety, virtue, and conduct. It is an invaluable document both for the general history of the Frankish era, but also provides evidence for the levels of education that Frankish nobility--even, notably, noblewomen--could obtain within the prescriptive bounds of early medieval society. It contains numerous quotations from and allusions to the Bible, and some references to secular writers, though some of the references are incorrect and the Latin is not overly polished. The Liber Manualis also discusses numerology and computation, particularly in its ninth book, presenting numbers as tools for moral instruction and memory.

Dhuoda noted that she began writing the Liber Manualis in late 841, shortly after a major Frankish civil war battle on 22 June 841 and just after her son William reached the age of fifteen. She completed her manual on 2 February 843, during the period leading up to the Treaty of Verdun. Dhuoda was precise in dating her work. Her references to specific feast days and liturgical celebrations have been understood as linking her personal circumstances to the broader political events of that period.

Dhuoda wrote the Liber Manualis while she was fearing for the lives of herself and her children. Christian devotion was an important part in the lives of Frankish nobility and was the main theme throughout the handbook. Presented as advice for her son, the Liber Manualis also subtly addresses a wider courtly audience. Alongside religious guidance, the text provides advice on political conduct, loyalty, and proper courtly behavior, reflecting Dhuoda’s experience within elite Carolingian society.

Although the book's title doesn’t contain the name of her son, William, it is made clear in the introduction and conclusion of the book that the intended audience was that of her oldest son. Several manuscripts of the Liber Manualis have survived, suggesting that the work circulated beyond its initial recipient. The Liber Manualis also subtly addresses a courtly audience. Alongside religious guidance, the text also provides advice on political conduct, loyalty, and proper courtly behavior, reflecting Dhuoda’s experience within elite Carolingian society. This has led to the view that Dhuoda was not only a mother providing private counsel, but also a contributor to the intellectual culture of the Carolingian court. Some historians also believe that in addition to her son Dhuoda intended to have the extended audience of his peers at court including Charles the Bald. In addition to this she also encouraged William to share what he learned from the handbook with his younger brother when he is older.

The Liber Manualis is divided by the 1975 editor into the following books:

- Prologue – the author and her reasons for writing
- Book 1 – loving God
- Book 2 – the mystery of Trinity
- Book 3 – social order and secular success
- Book 4 – moral life
- Book 5 – God's chastisement of those he loves
- Book 6 – the usefulness of the beatitudes
- Book 7 – the deaths of the body and of the spirit
- Book 8 – how to pray and for whom
- Book 9 – interpreting numbers
- Book 10 – summary of the work's major points, more on the author
- Book 11 – the usefulness of reciting the Psalms

The work is known from a manuscript of the seventeenth century in the Bibliothèque Nationale, Paris, and from fragments of a manuscript of the Carolingian epoch, found in the library of Nîmes.

=== Influence ===
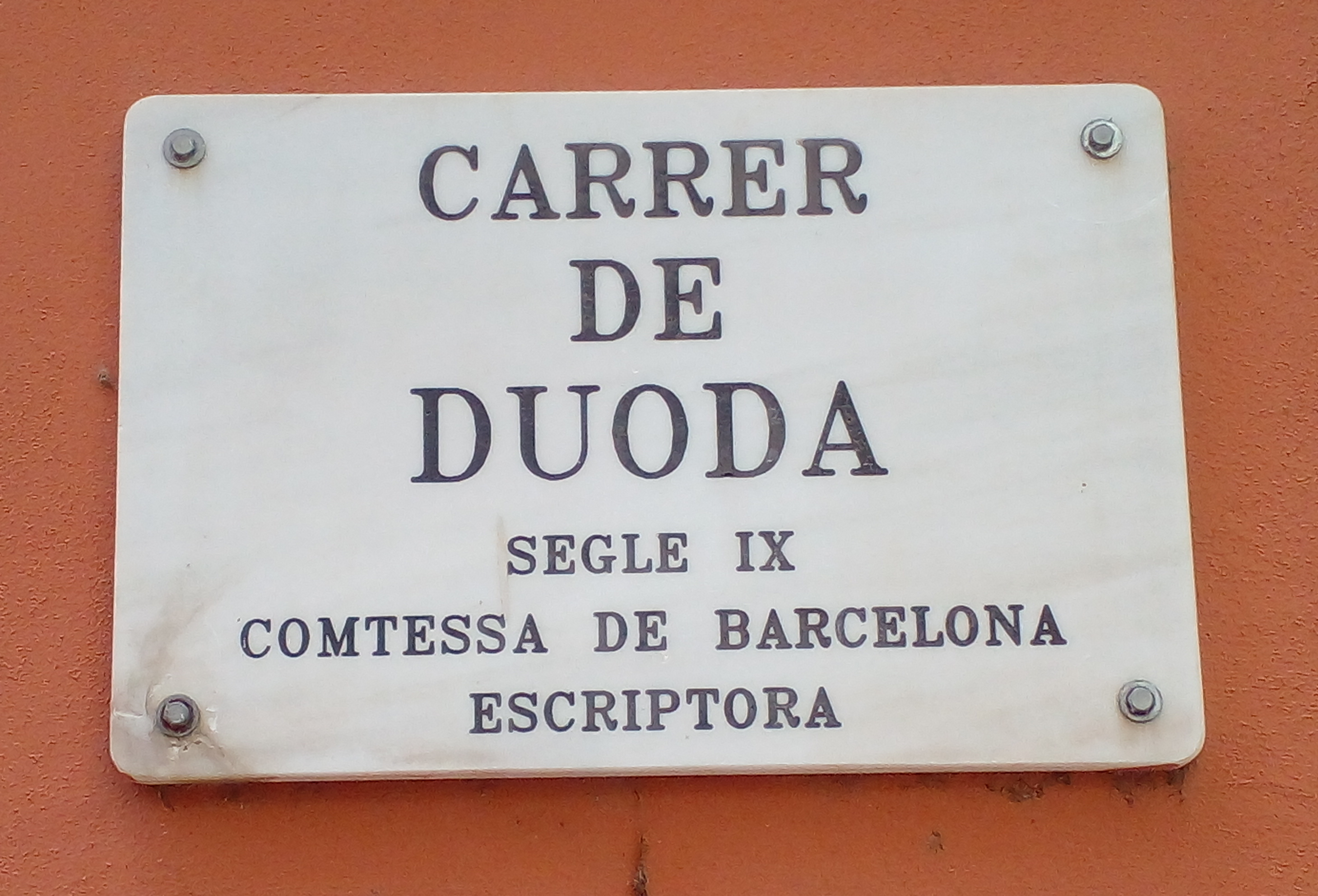
Street in Barcelona named in her honour

Dhuoda's book is the only one known to be written by a woman to survive from the Carolingian period. Her work is important in that it offers insight into the education of women, the raising of children, the order of society, the importance of fathers, and how Christianity impacted the lives of the Frankish nobility.

Dhuoda was not the only elite Carolingian woman to combine learning with maternal guidance. Contemporary figures such as Empress Judith, the wife of Louis the Pious, were also recognized for their involvement in their children’s education and as participants in Carolingian literary culture.

Having the Liber Manualis provides one look into what knowledge women's education provided in this period. Dhuoda's handbook showed that she was not only literate but also understood numerical learning. The numerology passages suggest that Carolingian aristocratic women, and men, engaged with mathematical and symbolic ideas beyond basic arithmetic. In addition to being a guide for William, Dhuoda provides examples of her knowledge on Christian texts like the Bible and other topics, like the Latin language.

Pierre Riché, a 1975 French translator of Dhuoda's work, argued that Dhuoda's intellectual background represented the education offered to women during the reign of Charlemagne and Louis the Pious.

Dhuoda often stresses the importance of obeying fathers, even above kings, highlighting the importance of patriarchy in Frankish society. For example, she says: "Now I must do my best to guide you in how you should fear, love, and be faithful to your lord and father, Bernard, in all things, both when you are with him and when you are apart from him." (Book 3)

Dhuoda often references works by thinkers including Alcuin of York, Gregory of Tours, and Augustine of Hippo, among many others.

Dhuoda's work was not widely studied until 1975 when Pierre Riché translated the text in French in 1975 and it was available for wider distribution.

Duoda is the name given to the Duoda Women’s Research Centre or Centre for Research on Women at the University of Barcelona, Spain

=== Quotations ===
- You will find in it [the handbook] a mirror in which you can without hesitation contemplate the health of your soul, so that you may be pleasing not only in this world, but to him who formed you out of dust. (Prologue)
- Among the human race, to attain perfection requires the application of great and constant effort. We must apply to various evils the remedies that are their antidotes. (Book 4)
- We know that poverty and want are found not only among the least of men but also frequently, for many reasons, among the great, So it is that a rich man too may be in need. Why? Because his soul is wretchedly needy. And then there is the poor man who gathers riches with great ease. Or the rich man who envies the poor man, or the poor man who wishes to become rich, just as an unlettered man wishing to become learned may desire this completely but never accomplish it. (Book 4)
- Pray for the past, if you have been neglectful, that you may finally forget this; for present evils, that you may always escape them; for the future, that you may beware those evils and that they not continue to pursue you there. (Book 8)
- Because the recitation of the Psalms has such and so many powers, my son William, I urge and direct that you recite them constantly, for yourself, for your father, for all the living, for those persons who have stood lovingly by you, for all the faithful who are dead, and for those whose commemoration is written down here or who you command be added. And do not hesitate to recite the Psalms that you choose for the remedy of my soul, so that when my last day and the end of my life come for me, I may be found worthy to be raised up to heaven on the right with those good folk whose actions have been worthy, not on the left with the impious. Return frequently to this little book. Farewell, noble boy, and always be strong in Christ. (Book 11)

== Bibliography ==
The Liber manualis (full title: Liber manualis Dhuodane quem ad filium suum transmisit Wilhelmum) has been edited and translated:

- Thiebaux, Marcelle (ed. and tr.). Dhuoda. Handbook for her warrior son. Cambridge Medieval Classics 8. Cambridge, 1998. (English translation)
- Riché, Pierre (ed.), Bernard de Vregille and Claude Mondésert (trs.), Dhuoda: Manuel pour mon Fils. Sources Chrétiennes 225. Paris, 1975.(French translation)
- Bondurand, Édouard (ed. and tr.). Le Manuel de Dhuoda. Paris: Picard, 1887. French translation. PDF of reprint available from Gallica
- Mabillon, Jacques (ed.). PL 106.109–118. Partial edition, available from Documenta Catholica Omnia
- Neel, Carol (tr.). Handbook for William. A Carolingian woman’s counsel for her son. Regents Studies in Medieval Culture. Lincoln: University of Nebraska Press, 1991.
- Thiebaux, Marcelle (tr.). The Writings of Medieval Women. New York, 1987. 65–79. Selective translation into English.

A selection of secondary literature in English and French:

- Cherewatuk, Karen. "Speculum Matris: Duoda’s Manual." Florilegium 10 (1988–91): 49–64. <http://gilles.maillet.free.fr/histoire/pdf/dhuoda.pdf>
- Claussen, Martin A. "God and Man in Dhuoda’s Liber Manualis." SCH 27 (1990): 43–52.
- Claussen, Martin A. "Fathers of Power and Mothers of Authority: Dhuoda and the Liber Manualis". French Historical Studies 19 (1996): 785–809.
- Dronke, Peter. Women Writers of the Middle Ages. Cambridge, 1984.
- Durrens, Janine. Dhuoda, duchesse de Septimanie. Clairsud, 2003.
- Godard, Jocelyne. Dhuoda. La Carolingienne. Le Sémaphore, 1997.
- Marchand, James. "The Frankish Mother: Dhuoda." In Medieval Woman Writers, ed. Katharina M. Wilson. Athens, 1984. 1–29. Includes selective translation of the Liber Manualis.
- Mayeski, Marie Anne. "A Troublesome Puppy: Dhuoda of Septimania." In Women: Models of Liberation. Sheed & Ward, 1988.
- Mayeski, Marie Anne. "Mother's Psalter: Psalms in the Moral Instruction of Dhuoda of Septimania." In The Place of the Psalms in the Intellectual Culture of the Middle Ages. ed. Nancy van Deusen. State University of New York Press, 1999.
- Mayeski, Marie Anne. Dhuoda: Ninth Century Mother and Theologian. University of Scranton Press, 1995.
- Nelson, Janet L. "Dhuoda." In Lay Intellectuals in the Carolingian World, ed. Patrick Wormald and Janet L. Nelson. Cambridge, 2007. 106–120.
- Stofferahn, Steven A. "The many faces in Dhuoda's mirror: The Liber Manualis and a century of scholarship." Magistra. A journal of women's spirituality in history 4.2 (Winter 1998): 89–134.
