= Spanish March =

Counties in Southern border of the Frankish Kingdom

The Spanish March and surrounding regions.

The Spanish March or Hispanic March was a march or military buffer zone established after the failed Umayyad invasion of Gaul. It was established in c. 795 by Charlemagne in the eastern Pyrenees and nearby areas, to protect the new territories of the Christian Carolingian Empire—the Duchy of Gascony, the Duchy of Aquitaine, and Septimania—from the Muslim Umayyad Emirate of Córdoba in al-Andalus.

In its broader meaning, the Spanish March sometimes refers to a group of early Iberian and trans-Pyrenean lordships or counts coming under Frankish rule. As time passed, these lordships merged or gained independence from Frankish imperial rule.

== Geographical context ==
The area of the Spanish March broadly corresponds to the eastern regions between the Pyrenees and the Ebro. The local population of the march was diverse. It included Basques in its northwestern valleys, the Jews of Occitania, and a large Occitano-Romance-speaking population governed by the Visigothic Code, all of them under the influence of al-Andalus since their lords had vowed allegiance to the Umayyad Córdoban rulers in 719, until King Pepin the Short of Francia conquered Septimania in 759. The Pyrenean valleys started to switch loyalties after 785 (Girona, Ribagorza, etc.).

The territory of the Spanish March changed with the fortunes of the empires and the feudal ambitions of those, whether counts or walis, who were appointed to administer the counties. Though owing loyalty to the Carolingian monarch, the counts became largely autonomous. Out of the welter of counties in the march, many would be absorbed by more powerful counties, leading to the predominance of the County of Barcelona, from which, along with its vassal counties, would emerge the Principality of Catalonia centuries later. Other Spanish March counties would later be absorbed into the kingdoms of Aragon or France. Only Andorra, between modern France and Spain, retained its independence.

Counties that at various times formed part of the Spanish March included Ribagorza (initially including Pallars), Urgell, Cerdanya, Peralada, Empúries, Besalú, Osona, Barcelona, and Girona. The Gothic March included Conflent, Roussillon, Vallespir and Fenouillet.

The nominal boundaries attributed to the Spanish and Gothic marches vary in time and not without confusion. Also, Navarre and Aragon have sometimes been depicted as being within the Spanish March, but formally they were not. However, they came under Carolingian overlordship between 794 and 806 as part of the Duchy of Vasconia (Gascony).

== History ==
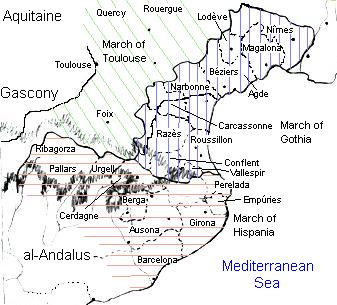
The Spanish March and the March of Gothia.

By 716, under the pressure of the Umayyad Caliphate from the south, the Kingdom of the Visigoths had been rapidly reduced to the province of Narbonensis (Septimania), a region which corresponds approximately to the modern Languedoc-Roussillon. With the exception of the Visigothic province of Septimania and some territories in the mountains of northern Hispania, the Umayyad conquest of the Visgothic Kingdom of Hispania was largely complete by 718. In 719, the Umayyad forces of al-Samh ibn Malik bypassed the Pyrenees by marching along the Mediterranean coast to conquer Septimania and established a fortified base at the city of Narbonne. Umayyad control of this frontier province was secured by offering the local population generous terms, intermarriage between ruling families, and treaties. Further Umayyad expansion northward was halted by al-Samh ibn Malik al-Khawlanis defeat at the Battle of Toulouse in 721. Wālis were installed in Girona and Barcelona.

In 725, his successor, Anbasa ibn Suhaym al-Kalbi, besieged the city of Carcassonne, which had to agree to cede half of its territory, pay tribute, and make an offensive and defensive alliance with Muslim forces. Nîmes and all the other main Septimanian cities fell too under the sway of the Umayyads. In the 720s the savage fighting, the massacres and destruction particularly affecting the Ebro valley and Septimania unleashed a flow of refugees who mainly found shelter in southern Aquitaine across the Pyrenees, and Provence. Peace was signed in 730 between the victor at Toulouse, the Duke of Aquitaine, and Munuza, a Berber rebel Muslim lord based in Cerdanya (in current-day Catalonia), a region that could act as a buffer zone against Umayyad expansionism. The peace treaty was sealed with the marriage of the Duke’s daughter to Munuza. However, Munuza was defeated by an Umayyad military expedition in 731 during another Umayyad expansion.

The Spanish March was to be the result of the southward expansion of the Frankish realm from its heartland in Neustria and Austrasia starting with Charles Martel in 732 after various decades of fighting between the Franks and Umayyads or "Saracens".

The Dukes of Aquitaine (including Vasconia) pledged formal allegiance to the kings of the Franks several times, Odo the Great in 732 and Hunald I in 736 after being defeated, but remained independent. In 737, Charles Martel led an expedition to the lower Rhône and Septimania, possibly seeing that the Umayyad thrust was threatening his grip on Burgundy, which had just been subdued in 736, but he failed to keep the region.

Both Aquitaine and Septimania were still out of Frankish control after Charles's death, but Pepin the Short was determined to subdue southern Gaul. In 759, after conquering Septimania from the Umayyads, the Carolingian king focused all his might in crushing Aquitanian resistance to central Frankish power. After a ruthless war of eight years, Aquitainian independence came to an end. Toulouse was now under the grip of the new Carolingian king, Charlemagne, and access to al-Andalus was open to him despite sporadic rebellions in Vasconia over the next two decades (Basques subdued in 790 by Charlemagne's new loyal strongman in Toulouse, William of Gellone).

The first county to be established by the Franks from the territory taken from the Muslims was Roussillon (with Vallespir) circa 760. In 785 the county of Girona (with Besalú) to the south of the Pyrenees was taken. Ribagorza and Pallars were linked to Toulouse and were added to this county circa 790. Urgell and Cerdanya were added in 798. The first records of the county of Empúries (with Perelada) are from 812 but the county was probably under Frankish control before 800.

Pepin's son, Charlemagne, fulfilled the Carolingian goal of extending the defensive boundaries of the empire beyond Septimania, creating a strong barrier between the Umayyad Caliphate and Francia, besides tightening control over the Duchy of Vasconia by establishing the Kingdom of Aquitaine, ruled by his son Louis the Pious in 781.

After a series of struggles the County of Barcelona (with Ausona) was taken by Frankish forces in 801. A number of castles were established in Aragon between 798 and 802 (appointment by Count Aureolus). After subduing the Basques to the north of the Pyrenees (790), Frankish overlordship expanded to the upper Ebro (794) and Pamplona (798), when Alfonso II of Asturias also came under Charlemagne's influence. Sobrarbe was not incorporated into the march, as it appears later in history and was probably within the area of influence of the County of Aragon.

The death of Charlemagne (814) was followed by a scene of open revolt and Carolingian setbacks around the Pyrenees. After being defeated by the Moors in the 816 Battle of Pancorbo, Pamplona, now led by the Basque lord Iñigo Arista broke away from the Spanish March, with the County of Aragon following suit shortly thereafter in 820. The counties to the south, which were used by the Moors to enter and overrun Visigothic Septimania in 719, became, at this point, a natural extension of the March of Gothia ruled by local counts under the Carolingian Empire.

== Structure ==
The local population of the Spanish March was diverse. The majority were Hispano-Romans (Goths) and Basques but there were also Muslims, and Jews from Septimania who repopulated the Frankish conquered easternmost territories of present-day northern Spain and a small portion of southern France. The area changed with the fortunes of the empires and the feudal ambitions of the counts appointed to administer the counties. As Frankish imperial power waned, the rulers of the March of Hispania became independent fiefs. Most of the region would later become part of Catalonia.

Charlemagne's son Louis the Pious took Barcelona from its Moorish ruler in 801, thus securing Frankish power in the borderland between the Franks and the Moors. The Counts of Barcelona then became the principal representatives of Frankish authority in the Spanish March. The march included various outlying smaller territories, each ruled by a lesser miles with his armed retainers and who theoretically owed allegiance through the count to the emperor.

The rulers of the counties were called counts and when they governed several counties they often took the title of duke (Dux Gothiae). When the county formed the border with the Muslim Kingdom, the Frankish title marquis (Marquis de Gothie) was chosen. Besides, certain counts aspired to the Frankish title "Prince of Gothia". A margrave or Marcgravi is a Graf ("duke") of the March. The later Toulousain and Catalan lords, such as Bernard of Septimania, Humfrid, Bernard of Gothia, Borrell II, and Ramon Borrell, inherited these titles.

In the early 9th century, Charlemagne began issuing a new kind of land grant, the aprisio, which reallocated land previously held by the imperial crown fisc in deserted or abandoned areas. This included special rights and immunities that allowed considerable independence from the imperial control. Historians have interpreted the aprisio both as an early form of feudalism and in economic and military terms as a mechanism to entice settlers to a depopulated border region. Such self-sufficient landholders would aid the counts in providing armed men to defend the Frankish frontier. Aprisio grants (the first ones were in Septimania) were given personally by the Carolingian king, so that they reinforced loyalty to central power, to counterbalance the local power exercised by the march's counts.

However poor communications and a distant central power allowed these basic feudal, heavily agrarian entities to be self-sufficient. Each was ruled by a small hereditary military elite. For example, the first Count of Barcelona Bera was appointed by the King in 801, however subsequently strong heirs were able to inherit the title such as Sunifred, fl. 844–848. This gradually became custom until countship became hereditary (for Wifred the Hairy in 897). The County of Barcelona became de facto independent under count Borrell II, when he ceased to request royal charters after the kings Lothair and Hugh Capet failed to assist him in the defense of the county against Muslim leader al-Mansur, although the change of dynasty may have played a part in that decision; meanwhile other counties maintained links with the Frankish crown for a longer time.

The early history of Andorra in the Pyrenees provides a fairly typical example of a lordship of the region, as Andorra is the only part of the Spanish March that was never incorporated into either France or Spain, a feat mentioned in its national anthem, El Gran Carlemany.
