= Bernard Plantapilosa =

Frenkish count (881–886)

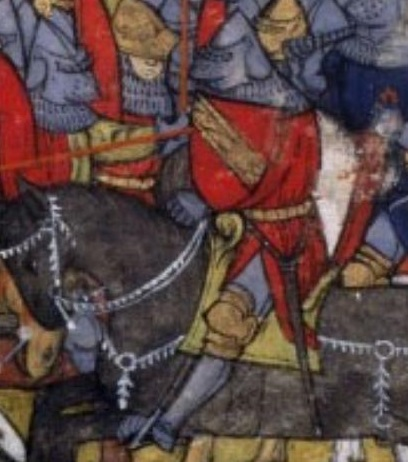
Bernart Plantapilosa

Bernard Plantapilosa or Bernard II of Auvergne (22 March 841-886), or Plantevelue, son of Bernard of Septimania and Dhuoda, was the Count of Auvergne (as Bernard II) from 872 to his death. The Emperor Charles the Fat granted him the title of Margrave of Aquitaine in 885.

His mother's Liber Manualis mentions that he was born at Uzès in the year following the death of Louis the Pious. He was appointed Margrave of Septimania (or Gothia) before 868. He was the lay abbot of Brioude between 857 and 868 and Count of Autun and from 864 to 869. He was deposed before 876 and replaced by Bernard of Gothia in that year. He returned to favour under Charles the Fat. In the war against Boso of Provence, he obtained the county of Mâcon.

== Family ==
He married Ermengard, countess of Auvergne in her own right as its heiress. Her father is often given as a count Bernard I of Auvergne, active in the 860s, but these instances may represent Ermengard's husband Plantapilosa and not a predecessor in the county. An earlier Count Bernard was active in the Auvergne in the 840s, but has no known connection to Ermengard. Instead, she was perhaps daughter of Guerin of Provence, Count of Auvergne, and his wife Ava. Their children were:

- William I of Aquitaine
- Warin
- Ava
- Adelinda, who married Acfred I of Carcassonne

== Etymology ==
Plantapilosa is often claimed to mean "Hairyfeet" or "Hairypaws". This is based on the Latin meaning "sole of foot" of planta.

== Sources ==
- Bouchard, Constance Brittain Those of My Blood: Creating Noble Families in Medieval Francia, University of Pennsylvania Press: 2001.
- Hummer, Hans J. Politics and Power in Early Medieval Europe: Alsace and the Frankish Realm 600–1000. Cambridge University Press: 2005.
- MacLean, Simon. Kingship and Politics in the Late Ninth Century: Charles the Fat and the end of the Carolingian Empire. Cambridge University Press: 2003.
