= Acfred of Toulouse =

Count of Toulouse

Acfred (also Acfredus, Egfridus, Ecfrid or Effroi) was the Count of Toulouse from 842 to 843. When Charles the Bald deposed Bernard of Septimania in 842, he installed Acfred in Toulouse in July. The next year, however, Bernard, allied with Pepin II of Aquitaine, expelled Acfred. He never regained his country. Acfred's deposition was not recognised by the king until 844 or 845, when, having defeated and executed Bernard, he appointed Fredelon count of Toulouse. Perhaps Acfred had died by then, but perhaps not.
