= Isembard, Count of Autun =

Isembard (also spelled Isembart or Isembert) was a Burgundian nobleman and count of Autun. According to the Annales Fontanellenses, his father was Warin of Provence.

In 850, Isembard and Count Aledramn of Barcelona were sent by King Charles the Bald to subdue the rebellious Margrave William of Septimania. They were both captured through a ruse. On 21 March 858, at the synod of Quierzy, Isembard was one of the lay magnates who swore fidelity to King Charles. He was thus probably one of the "leading men of Burgundy" whom the Annales Bertiniani record as joined Charles at Brienne and Chalon that November, when he and Louis the German almost came to battle.

On 20 June 859, Isembard (or possibly his son), described as a fidelis (loyal follower) in the charter, received a villa in the Narbonnais from the king, to be held in perpetuity (in proprium aeternaliter) as an allod. In 864, Isembard (or possibly his son again) was a royal missus and the viscount of Narbonne. The appointment of a royal fidelis to the office of viscount demonstrates that at this stage in Charles's reign, the king still coveted influence at the local level even in the far south of his realm.
