= Guerin of Provence =

Carolingian nobleman

Guerin, Garin, Warin, or Werner (Latin: Werinus or Guarnarius; died 845 or 856) was the Count of Auvergne, Chalon, Mâcon, Autun, Arles and Duke of Provence, Burgundy, and Toulouse. Guerin established the region against the Saracens from a base of Marseille and fortified Chalon-sur-Saône (834). He took part in many campaigns during the civil wars that marked the reign of Louis the Pious (814–840) and after his death until the Treaty of Verdun (843). The primary sources for his life are charters and chronicles like the Vita Hludovici.

There is a good deal of confusion amongst authors over the exact identity of this person. He has been allocated as a son of William of Gellone and his second wife Guitbergis (or Vuithbergis) on the basis of the Liber Manualis of Dhuoda, wife of Bernard of Septimania, one of William's sons by his first wife. Otherwise, he has been recently hypothesised as the son or grandson of Adalard, Count of Chalon, who defended that site against Waifer of Aquitaine. Warin was thus Count of Chalon by heredity or by grateful gift of the king on account of his father's service. This latter theory hinges on the assumption that there were two Guerins who have been subsequently confused: Guerin I and his son Guerin II. Neither descent from William of Gellone nor the two persons hypothesis are universally accepted. His proximity, in extant documents of the time, to Bernard of Septimania has been used as evidence for a relationship to that family, as has the existence of a related "Count Guerin" in later charters of the 850s and 860s. Guerin has been suggested as a brother of Bernard I of Auvergne, whose relationships are unknown.

In 818, Louis the Pious granted him the Auvergne, probably because of a connection of his wife's, for she was possibly the daughter of the previous count Ithier. In 825, he received the town of Cluny from Hildebald, Bishop of Mâcon, in an exchange.

In 819, he and Berengar of Toulouse invaded Gascony to put down a rebellion of Lupus III Centule, as recorded by both the Annales regni Francorum and the Vita Hludowici. By 820, Gascony was pacified and Carolingian authority restored, but not across the Pyrenees in Navarre.

On 24 July 840 in Strasbourg, Lothair precipitated a new civil war by declaring his imperium over all the lands of the empire and, joining with his nephew Pepin II of Aquitaine, attacked the Loire Valley. While Ermenaud III of Auxerre, Arnulf of Sens, Audri of Autun, and Gerard II of Paris pledged themselves for Lothair, Guerin and Adalbert of Avallon remained with Charles the Bald. In March 841, the Burgundians faithful to Charles accompanied Guerin to Aquitaine, from which they expelled Lothair and Pepin. In May, Guerin, as dux cum Tolosanis et Provincianis, joined Charles and the king of Bavaria, Louis the German, at Châlons-sur-Marne. In June, Pepin finally joined with Lothair in Auxerre. On 25 June 841, Lothair and Pepin initiated the ensuing Battle of Fontenoy and had the upper hand until the arrival of Guerin and his army of Provençals turned the tide in favour of Charles.

Charles sent Guerin to expel Bernard of Septimania from Toulouse in 842 and then against Gothia in 843. After the Treaty of Verdun in August that year, he was the dux and marchio in Provence under Lothair. He may have inherited that office from Leibulf around 829. In 844, he received Autun, which had been stripped from Bernard's heir William. The French historian Pierre Andoque asserts that Bernard was captured in 843 by Guerin in Uzès and brought before Charles to be executed in 844. He was succeeded in 845 by Fulcrad as duke, with Marseille going to a count Adalbert.

Guerin married Albane (or Ava) and was the father of Isembard, Count of Autun, and perhaps of Ermengarde mother of William I, Duke of Aquitania.

== Sources ==
- Lewis, Archibald R. (1965). The Development of Southern French and Catalan Society, 718–1050. Austin: University of Texas Press.
- Guinard, P. Recherches sur les origines des seigneurs de Semur-en-Brionnais. Semur-en-Brionnais, 1996.
