= Odalric of Barcelona =

Spanish count and noble

Odalric, also spelled Odalrih, Odelric, or Udalrich, was the Count of Barcelona, Girona, Roussillon, and Empúries and Margrave of Septimania from 852 to 858.

Odalric was a Hunfriding, probably the second son of Hunfrid, Margrave of Istria. He had to deal with increasing conflicts with the Muslim kingdoms to the south while the Frankish Empire was suffering succession issues.

== Sources ==
- Lewis, Archibald R. The Development of Southern French and Catalan Society, 718–1050. University of Texas Press: Austin, 1965.

Preceded by Aleran	Count of Barcelona; 852–858	Succeeded by Humfrid
