= Odalric =

Odalric is a masculine given name related to Ulrich. It may refer to:

- Odalric, Count of Barcelona (fl. 850s)
- Odalric (bishop), Archbishop of Reims (962–969)
- Oldřich, Duke of Bohemia (c. 975–1034) (German: Odalric)
- Ulric I, Margrave of Carniola (died 1070), also spelled Odalric
