= Ermenguer =

Visigoth count (r. 813–817)

Ermenguer was the ruler of the County of Empúries whose attested reign was from 813 to 817. In 813, his naval influence reached the Balearic Islands.
