= Sunifred of Barcelona =

9th-century Catalan nobleman

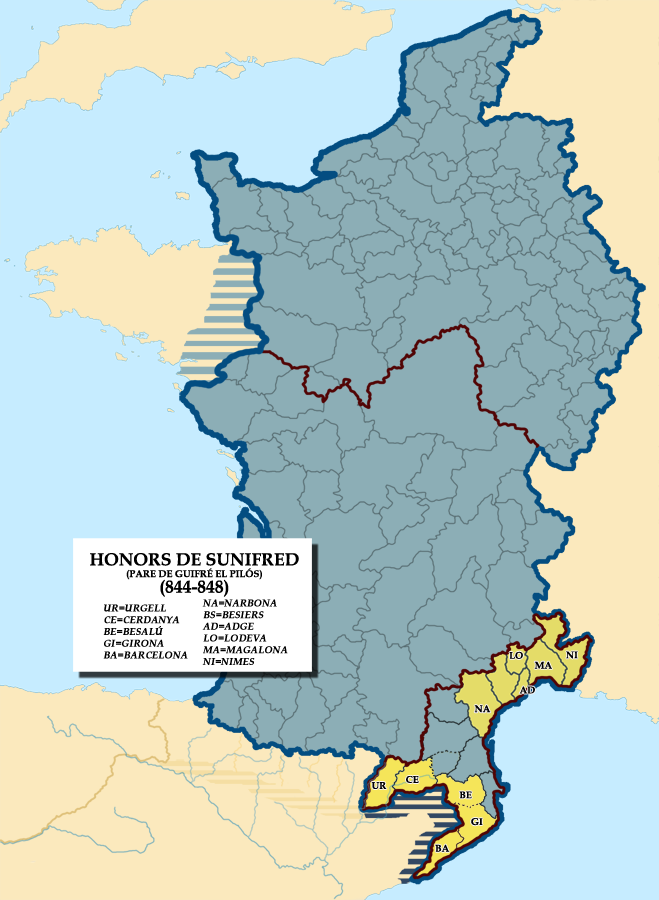
Honors-sunifred-844-848

Sunifred I (died 848) was the count of Urgell and Cerdanya from 834 to 848, and the count of Barcelona as well as many other Catalan and Septimanian counties, including Ausona, Besalú, Girona, Narbonne, Agde, Béziers, Lodève, Melgueil, Conflent and Nîmes, from 844 to 848.

He may have been the son of Belló, Count of Carcassonne, or, more probably, his son-in-law. In 834, he was named Count of Urgell and Cerdanya by Louis the Pious, Holy Roman Emperor; at the time these counties were under the control of Aznar Galíndez I, an ally of the Banu Qasi. Sunifred conquered Cerdanya in 835 and Urgell three years later (838).

In the dynastic struggles that accompanied the three years between Louis the Pious' death (840) and the Treaty of Verdun (843), Bernard of Septimania, Count of Barcelona (and many other marches and counties, including Septimania, Girona, Narbonne, Béziers, Agde, Melgueil, Nîmes and Toulouse), failed to align with Charles the Bald. Bernard did not enter the fray at the Battle of Fontenoy (841), and had to leave his son William as a hostage to guarantee his good behavior in the future. Sunifred, on the other hand, halted a Moor invasion in 841/2, which marched against Narbonne through the region of Cerdanya and he was granted land in 843. In 844, Pepin II of Aquitaine rose again in rebellion, supported by Bernard. After the siege of Toulouse, and the capture and execution of Bernard, Sunifred received the counties of Barcelona, Girona and the march of Gothia. Sunifred also augmented his domains when Conflent fell into his hands, as reigning count of Cerdanya, on the death of Bera II.

He was apparently successful at pacifying the march and stopping the Moors, since in 847 envoys went from Cordoba to Rheims to make peace. In 848, William was named count of Toulouse and Empúries by Pepin II, as part of his continuing struggle with Charles the Bald. He quickly moved to eliminate Sunifred and his brother Sunyer. Both brothers died in 848 and some of their counties were assumed by William. Sunifred supposedly died of natural causes, but the cause of Sunyer's death is unknown.

Sunifred I married Ermesende, and had the following children:

- Wilfred the Hairy (died 11 August 897)
- Radulf of Besalú (died 920)
- Miro the Elder (died 896)
- Sisenanda
- Sunifred (abbot of Abbey of Arles-sur-Tech)
- Riculf (Roman Catholic Diocese of Perpignan-Elne)
- Cixilona

== Notes ==
Preceded by Aznar Galíndez I	Count of Cerdanya; Count of Urgell; 834–848	Succeeded by Solomon I of Urgell
Preceded by Bernard of Septimania	Count of Barcelona; 844–848	Succeeded by William of Septimania
