= Gaucelm =

Frankish count and magnate

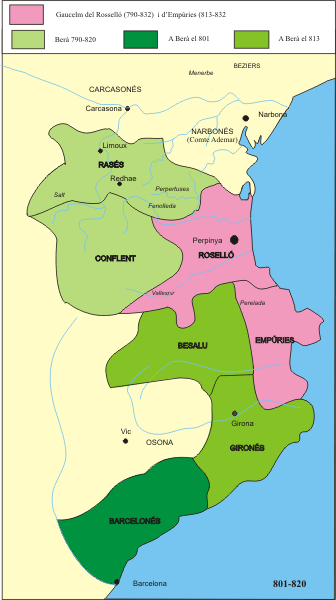
Gaucelm was the count of Rosselló and Empúries, both of which are highlighted in pink on this map. The image visually contextualizes the extent of his rule within the region of early medieval Catalonia.

Gaucelm (died 834) was a Frankish count and leading magnate in Gothia during the reign of Louis the Pious. He was initially the Count of Roussillon from about 800, but he received Empúries in 817 and was thenceforward the chief representative of imperial authority in that region.

He was the son of William of Gellone and his first wife, Gunegunde (Cunegonde), a Frankish lady. It was from his father, sometime after 790, that he received the county of Roussillon to govern within his father's vast holdings in Septimania, centered on Toulouse. At that time, Roussillon included Vallespir. Gaucelm, thoroughly Frankish, supported ongoing war with the Moors and was supported by his brother, Bernard of Septimania. Bera, the Visigothic Count of Razès and Conflent since 790, and Count of Barcelona since 801, supported the local Goth population who desired peace with the Moors to their south.

In January 820, at an assembly in Aachen, Sanila, Gaucelm's Gothic lieutenant, probably on orders from Gaucelm, accused Bera of infidelity and perfidy. Bera was deposed, but Gaucelm did not receive his honores as he had wanted. However, he did later obtain two of them (Barcelona and Besalú) for his brother Bernard (February 826). The third, Girona, went either to Bernard or Gaucelm himself, but which is unclear. After taking part in the defeat of the son of Bera, Guillemundus, and his lieutenant, Aisso, in Barcelona and Girona (to 827), he received the counties of Razès and Conflent (both previously ruled by Guillemundus). While Bernard was absent from Septimania (April to April, 829 – 830), Gaucelm also ruled his honores: Uzès, Nîmes, Melguelh, Agde, Béziers, Narbonne, Besalú, and Barcelona.

In Autumn 831, Pepin I of Aquitaine revolted against his father, Emperor Louis the Pious. Bernard and Gaucelm supported Pepin. Subsequently invading royal forces quickly occupied Bernard's lands. In another assembly at Aachen in February 832, the whole region was assigned to Charles the Bald, while Gaucelm and Bernard were deposed later that same year. Gaucelm tried to resist and held out in Ampurias. Finally, in 833, after mediation with Ansegisus, Abbot of Fontanelle, he resigned and retired with Sanila to some familial properties in Burgundy.

Gaucelm and Sanila were killed in the battle of Chalon-sur-Saône the next year, while fighting for Louis the Pious against his son Lothair.

== Sources ==
- Lewis, Archibald R. The Development of Southern French and Catalan Society, 718–1050. University of Texas Press: Austin, 1965.

Preceded by none	Count of Roussillon; 800–832	Succeeded by Berengar the Wise
Preceded by Ermengar	County of Empúries; 817–832	Succeeded by Berengar the Wise
