= Humfrid, Margrave of Gothia =

9th-Century Hunfriding duke in Iberia

Humfrid was the count of Barcelona, Girona, Empúries, Roussillon, and Narbonne from 858 to 864. He also bore the title margrave of Gothia (Gothiæ marchio), as he held several frontier counties.

== Life ==
=== Early life and move West ===
He was a Hunfriding by birth, with no connection to Gothia. He was probably Hunfrid III, the second son of Hunfrid II, dux super Redicam (duke over Rhaetia). He rebelled against Louis the German, the king of East Francia, and was forced to flee to Charles the Bald, the king of West Francia, to whom he was one of the few to remain loyal during the vicissitudes of the 850s. He was appointed count and margrave of several counties in the Marca Hispanica by Charles, possibly as early as 854 and no later than 858.

=== Warrior under Charles the Bald ===
In 858, Humfrid negotiated a treaty of peace with Abd al-Rahman, the Moorish governor of Zaragoza, and marched into Gaul to the assistance of Charles. He arrived at Beaune in February and he did homage to the king on 21 March. He then joined Charles in making war on the Norsemen. Louis took this as an opportunity to invade the country and Humfrid assisted Charles in fending him off. In September, Humfrid regrouped with his forces at Beaune before joining in the defeat of Louis at Saint-Quentin on 15 January 859.

During the campaigning of 858, Humfrid had been enfeoffed with the County of Autun and Margraviate of Burgundy.

In 856, the Moors captured the castle of Terrassa near Barcelona. In 861, they besieged Barcelona itself, but Humfrid bought them off and renewed the treaty with the consent of Charles. It was to last for three decades.

=== Exile to the east ===
In 862, Charles named his son Charles the Child as king of Aquitaine. This was opposed by the nobles, who, with the exception of Humfrid, did not support the young Charles in his subsequent rebellion. The elder Charles accused Humfrid of disloyalty. On 19 August, Humfrid was deposed. He was not to give up, though. He took Toulouse and killed Count Raymond I in the fighting. Charles responded by confiscating Humfrid's Burgundian lands. Even the pretender Pepin II of Aquitaine led a band of Norsemen in an attack on Toulouse, but was repulsed. Humfrid then fled to Italy, and from there to Swabia, where, in 872, he was a count in Zürich. He was alive as late as 876.

== Sources ==
- Lewis, Archibald R. The Development of Southern French and Catalan Society, 718–1050. University of Texas Press: Austin, 1965.
- Calmette, J. "Onfroy, Marquis de Gothie." Etudes Médiévales.
- Chaume, M. "Onfroi, Marquis de Gothie, ses origines et ses attaches familiales." Annales du Midi, LII (1940).

Preceded by Odalric	Count of Barcelona; 858–865	Succeeded by Bernard
