= Count of Barcelona =

9th–18th century prince in Calalonia

The count of Barcelona (Catalan: comte de Barcelona, Spanish: conde de Barcelona, French: comte de Barcelone, Latin: comes Barcinonensis) was the ruler of the County of Barcelona and also, by extension and according with the Usages and Constitutions of Catalonia, of the Principality of Catalonia as prince (sovereign) for much of Catalan history, from the 9th century until the 18th century. After 1162, with Alfonso II of Aragon and I of Barcelona, the title of count of Barcelona was united with that of king of Aragon, and after the 16th century, with that of king of Spain.

== History ==
Catalan counties between 9th and 12th centuries

The Emperor Charlemagne conquered the area north of the river Ebro and captured the city of Barcelona in 801. He then organized these lands, historiographically known as the Marca Hispanica, into various counties, one of which was the County of Barcelona, with the city of Barcelona as its capital. The Count of Barcelona, usually holding other counties simultaneously, eventually obtained primacy over the region. As the County became hereditary in one family, the bond of the Counts to their Frankish overlords loosened, especially after the Capetian dynasty supplanted the Carolingians.

In 1150, Count Raymond Berengar IV married Queen Petronilla of Aragon. Their son Alfonso succeeded as Count and also as King of Aragon, establishing the Crown of Aragon. In the Treaty of Corbeil (1258), King Louis IX of France relinquished France's historical claim to the County. In 1516, Queen Joanna of Castile also succeeded in Catalonia and Aragon, forming the Monarchy of Spain. The title of Count of Barcelona remained one of the many hereditary titles of the Spanish monarchy.

In the 20th century, the title regained some prominence when Juan de Borbón, the exiled heir to the Spanish throne, adopted the title of Count of Barcelona. In doing so, he claimed a historical royal title without claiming to be the current king of Spain, especially after his son Juan Carlos became the prospective successor of the then-ruler of Spain, Francisco Franco. In 1977, after Juan Carlos had become king upon Franco's death in 1975, he officially awarded the comital title to his father, who had renounced his rights to the throne. Juan held that title until his death in 1993, when it reverted to Juan Carlos. Juan de Borbón's widow used the title Countess of Barcelona until her death in 2000.

== List of counts of Barcelona ==
=== Non-dynastic (appointed by the rulers of the Carolingian Empire), 801–878 ===
During this period, the County of Barcelona was one of many Counties at the March located in the Eastern Pyrenees and known as Gothia or Marca Hispanica. The Counts of this March were appointed by the Carolingian authorities.

| Name | Portrait | Reign | Notes |
|---|---|---|---|
| Bera | | 801–820 | son of William of Gellone, also Count of Razès and Conflent (790–820), Girona, Besalú, Ausona (812/817–820), deposed. |
| Rampon (Rampó) | | 820–826 | also Count of Girona and Besalú |
| Bernard I (Bernat I) | | 826–832 | son of William of Gellone, also margrave of Septimania (834–835) and Imperial Chamberlain (829–830), deposed. |
| Berenguer | | 832–835 | also Count of Toulouse. |
| Bernard I (Bernat I) | | 836–844 | restored, executed on orders of Charles the Bald. |
| Sunifred | | 844–848 | son or son-in-law of Belló of Carcassonne, also Count of Ausona, Besalú, Girona, Narbonne, Agde, Béziers, Lodève, Melgueil, Cerdanya, Urgell, Conflent and Nîmes. |
| William (Guillem) | | 848–850 | son of Bernard I, also Count of Toulouse (844–850), rebelled and was killed. |
| Aleran | | 850–852 | also Count of Empúries and Roussillon and Margrave of Septimania. |
| Odalric | | 852–858 | son of Hunfrid, Margrave of Istria, also Count of Girona, Roussillon, Empúries and Margrave of Septimania. |
| Humfrid | | 858–864 | son of Hunfrid II, Duke of Rhaetia, also Count of Girona, Empúries, Roussillon, and Narbonne and Margrave of Gothia. |
| Bernard II (Bernat II) | | 865–878 | son of Bernard of Poitiers also Count of Girona and Margrave of Gothia and Septimania, rebelled. |

=== House of Sunifred (Bellonids), 878–1162 ===
The crisis of the Carolingian Empire, incapable of attending to the requests for help against the Moorish attacks coming from the Catalan counts, resulted in a disconnection between them and the Carolingian central power far North. The County of Barcelona became a hereditary title.

| Name | Portrait | Birth | Marriage(s) | Death |
|---|---|---|---|---|
| Wilfred I the Hairy; 878 –897 | | c.840 Girona; Disputed filiation | Guinidilda; 877; 10 children | 897; Tremp aged 46–47 |
| Wilfred II Borrell I 897 –26 April 911 | | c.874 Girona; First son of Wilfred I and Guinidilda | Garsenda; 898; 1 child | 26 April 911; Barcelona aged 36–37 |
| Sunyer; 26 April 911 –947 | | c.890 Girona; Sixth son of Wilfred I and Guinidilda | Aimilda; 914; 1 child Richilde; 925; 5 children | 15 October 950; Lagrasse aged 59–60 |
| Miro I 947 –966 | | c.926 Barcelona; Second son of Sunyer and Richilde | Unmarried | 966 aged 39–40 |
| Borrell II; 947 –992 (joint rule 947-966) | | c.927 Barcelona; Third son of Sunyer and Richilde | Luitgarde; 968; 5 children | 992 aged 64–65 |
| Ramon Borrell; 988 –8 September 1017 (joint rule 988–992) | | 26 May 972; Girona; Son of Borrell II and Luitgarde | Ermesinde of Carcassonne; 993; 2 children | 8 September 1017; Barcelona aged 45 |
| Ermesinde of Carcassonne (regent 1017–1021, 1035–1039) | | 972; Carcassonne; Daughter of Roger I of Carcassonne and Adelaide of Melgueil | Ramon I Borrell III; 993; 2 children | 1 March 1058; Sant Quirze de Besora aged 85–86 |
| Berenguer Ramon I the Crooked; 8 September 1017 –31 March 1035 (under regency of Ermesinde of Carcassonne 1017–1021) | | 1004; Son of Ramon Borrell and Ermesinde of Carcassonne | Sancha of Castile; 1021; 2 children Guisla of Lluçá; 1027; 3 children | 31 March 1035; Barcelona aged 30–31 |
| Ramon Berenguer I the Old; 31 March 1035 –26 June 1076 (under regency of Ermesinde of Carcassonne 1035–1039) | | 1023; Girona; Son of Berenguer Ramon I and Sancha of Castile | Élisabeth de Nîmes; 1039; 3 children Blanche de Narbonne; 16 March 1051 (annulled 1052) no children Almodis de La Marche; 1056; Barcelona (together since 1052); 4 children | 26 June 1076; Barcelona aged 52–53 |
| Ramon Berenguer II the Towhead; 26 June 1076 –6 December 1082 | | c.1053 Girona; First/Second son of Ramon Berenguer I and Almodis de La Marche | Mafalda of Apulia-Calabria; 1078; Barcelona; 3 children | 6 December 1082; Sant Feliu de Buixalleu aged 28–29 |
| Berenguer Ramon II the Fratricide; 26 June 1076 –1097 (joint rule 1076–1082) | | c.1053 First/Second son of Ramon Berenguer I and Almodis de La Marche | Unmarried | 1097; Jerusalem aged 43–44 |
| Ramon Berenguer III the Great; 6 December 1082 –19 July 1131 (joint rule 1082–1097) | | 11 November 1082; Rodez; Son of Ramon Berenguer II and Mafalda of Apulia-Calabria | María Díaz de Vívar; 1103; 2 children Almodis de Mortain; 1106 no children Douce I, Countess of Provence; 3 February 1112; Arles; 7 children | 19 July 1131; Barcelona aged 48 |
| Ramon Berenguer IV the Saint; 19 July 1131 –6 August 1162 | | c.1113 Barcelona or Rodez; Son of Ramon Berenguer III and Douce I, Countess of Provence | Petronilla of Aragon; August 1150; Lleida; 5 children | 6 August 1162; Borgo San Dalmazzo aged 48–49 |

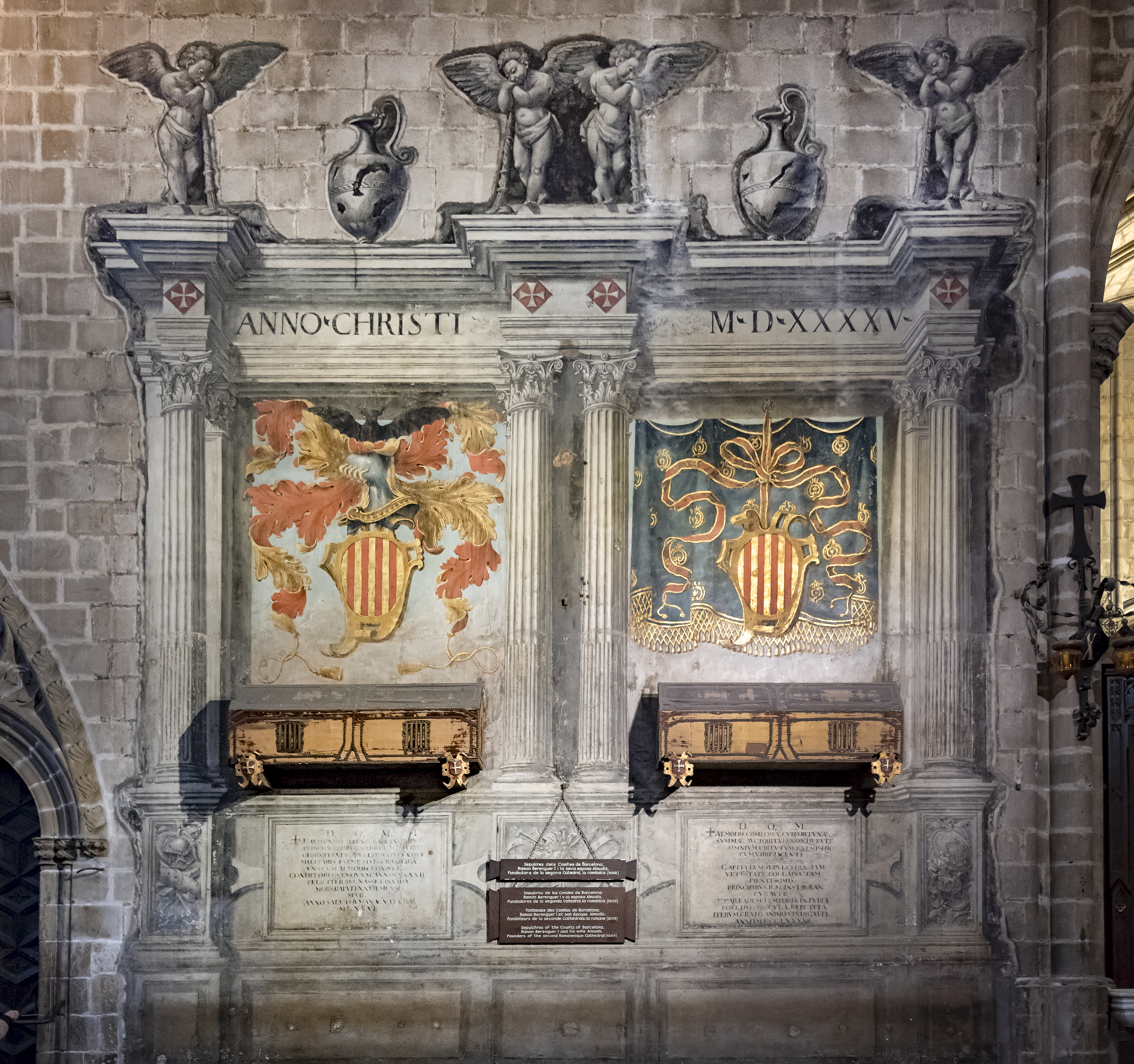
Tomb of Count Ramon Berenger I (d. 1076).

=== Jiménez dynasty, 1162–1164 ===
| Name | Portrait | Birth | Marriage(s) | Death |
|---|---|---|---|---|
| Petronilla; 6 August 1162 – 18 July 1164 | | 29 June 1136; Huesca daughter of Ramiro II of Aragon and Agnes of Aquitaine | Ramon Berenguer IV of Barcelona; August 1150; Lleida; 5 children | 15 October 1173; Barcelona aged 37 |

The succession of Ramon Berenguer IV and Petronilla led to the creation of the Crown of Aragon.

=== House of Barcelona, 1164–1410 ===
| Name | Portrait | Birth | Marriage(s) | Death |
|---|---|---|---|---|
| Alphonse I the Troubadour; 18 July 1164 – 25 April 1196 | Alfons I | 1-25 March 1157; Huesca son of Ramon Berenguer IV of Barcelona and Petronilla of Aragon | marriage agreement with Mafalda of Portugal 1159-1162, not fulfilled Sancha of Castile; 18 January 1174; Zaragoza; 7 children | 25 April 1196; Perpignan aged 44 |
| Peter I the Catholic; 25 April 1196 – 13 September 1213 | Peter I | July 1178; Huesca son of Alfons I and Sancha of Castile | Marie of Montpellier; 15 June 1204; 2 children | 12 September 1213; Battle of Muret aged 35 |
| James I the Conqueror; 13 September 1213 – 27 July 1276 | James I | 2 February 1208; Montpellier son of Peter I the Catholic and Marie of Montpellier | marriage agreement with Aurembiaix, Countess of Urgell 1209, not fulfilled Eleanor of Castile; 6 February 1221; Ágreda; 1 child Violant of Hungary; 8 September 1235; Barcelona; 10 children Teresa Gil de Vidaure (lover, then wife); 1255 (uncanonical marriage, repudiated 1260); 2 children | 27 July 1276; Valencia aged 68 |
| Peter II the Great; 27 July 1276 – 2 November 1285 | Peter II | July or August 1240; Valencia son of James I and Violant of Hungary | Constance of Sicily; 13 June 1262; Montpellier; 6 children | 2 November 1285; Vilafranca del Penedès aged 45 |
| Alphonse II the Liberal; 2 November 1285 – 18 June 1291 | Alfons II | 4 November 1265; Valencia son of Peter II and Constance of Sicily | Eleanor of England; 15 August 1290 (by proxy and not consummated; death of the groom during bride's way to Aragon) | 18 June 1291; Barcelona aged 25 |
| James II the Fair; 18 June 1291 – 2 November 1327 | James II | 10 August 1267; Valencia son of Peter II and Constance of Sicily | Isabella of Castile; 1 December 1291; Soria; No children Blanche of Anjou; 29 October or 1 November 1295; Vilabertran; 10 children Marie de Lusignan; 15 June 1315 (by proxy); Nicosia; 27 November 1315 (in person); Girona; No children Elisenda de Montcada; 25 December 1322; Tarragona; No children | 5 November 1327; Barcelona aged 60 |
| Alphonse III the Kind; 2 November 1327 – 24 January 1336 | Alfons III | 2 November 1299; Naples son of James II of Aragon and Blanche of Anjou | Teresa d'Entença; 1314; Lerida; 7 children Eleanor of Castile; 5 February 1329; Tarazona; 2 children | 27 January 1336; Barcelona aged 37 |
| Peter III the Ceremonious; 24 January 1336 – 5 January 1387 | Peter III | 5 October 1319; Balaguer son of Alphonse III and Teresa d'Entença | Maria of Navarre; 25 July 1337; Zaragoza; 2 children Leonor of Portugal; 14 or 15 November 1347; Barcelona; No children Eleanor of Sicily; 27 August 1349; Valencia; 4 children Sibila of Fortia; 11 October 1377; Barcelona; 3 children | 5 January 1387; Barcelona aged 68 |
| John the Hunter; 5 January 1387 – 19 May 1396 | John I | 27 December 1350; Perpignan son of Peter III and Eleanor of Sicily | marriage agreement with Jeanne-Blanche of France 1370-1371, not fulfilled Martha of Armagnac; 24 June 1373; Barcelona; 5 children Violant of Bar; 2 February 1380; Perpignan; 7 children | 19 May 1396; Foixà aged 46 |
| Martin the Humanist; 19 May 1396 – 31 May 1410 | Martí I | 1356; Girona son of Peter III and Eleanor of Sicily | Maria de Luna; 13 June 1372; Barcelona; 4 children Margaret of Prades; 17 September 1409; Barcelona; No children | 31 May 1410; Barcelona aged 54 |

=== House of Trastamara 1412-1462 ===
Martin died without legitimate descendants (interregnum 31 May 1410 – 24 June 1412). By the Compromise of Caspe of 1412 the County of Barcelona and the rest of the dominions of the Crown of Aragon passed to a branch of the House of Trastamara.

| Name | Portrait | Reign | Notes |
|---|---|---|---|
| Ferdinand I the Honest | | 3 September 1412 – 2 April 1416 | He was the nephew of Martin I and the first Count of Barcelona of the House of Trastámara. |
| Alphonse IV the Magnanimous | | 2 April 1416 – 27 June 1458 | He was the son of Ferdinand I. |
| John II the Faithless or the Just | | 27 June 1458 – 1462 | He was the brother of Alphonse IV. The Catalans confronted him during the Catalan Civil War and in 1462 transferred the title of count to another Trastamara House pretender|- |

=== Catalan Civil War 1462-1472 ===
During the Catalan Civil War the Catalan authorities transferred the title of Count of Barcelona to a succession of 3 foreign sovereigns.

| Name | Portrait | Reign | Notes |
|---|---|---|---|
| Henry I the Impotent | | 1462 - 1463 | He was the Ferdinand I grandson and thus also from the Trastámara House. |
| Peter IV of Portugal | | 1463 – 1466 | He was the greatgrandson of Peter III. |
| René I | | 1466 – 1472 | He was the grandson of John the Hunter. He was also the Count of Provence.- |

=== House of Trastamara (reinstated) 1472-1555 ===
After the Catalan Civil War, the House of Trastamara was restituted as tenants of the Count of Barcelona title and thus sovereigns of the Principality of Catalonia.

| Name | Portrait | Reign | Notes |
|---|---|---|---|
| John II the Faithless or the Just | | 1472 – 20 January 1479 | He was the brother of Alphonse IV. The Catalans confronted him during the Catalan Civil War and afterward reinstated him as Count of Barcelona. |
| Ferdinand II | | 20 January 1479 – 23 January 1516 | He was the son of John II. |
| Joanna | | 23 January 1516 – 12 April 1555 | She was the daughter of Ferdinand II. Her rule was nominal as it was her son Charles who was co-ruler. |

=== House of Habsburg 1516-1641 ===
| Name | Portrait | Reign | Notes |
|---|---|---|---|
| Charles I (emperor) | | 14 March 1516 – 12 April 1555 (as regent); 12 April 1555 – 16 January 1556 (as sole ruler) | He was the son of Queen Joanna and Philip I of Castile. Till the death of his mother, in 1555, he was regent but the de facto ruler. From 1555 to 1556, he was the sole ruler. As he was not the Count (till her mother died) and had good relations with Catalan authorities, they awarded him the title of Prince of Catalonia. |
| Philip I | | 16 January 1556 – 13 September 1598 | He was the son of Charles I. |
| Philip II | | 13 September 1598 – 31 March 1621 | He was the son of Philip I. |
| Philip III | | 31 March 1621 – 1641 | He was the son of Philip II. He wanted to reduce the Catalan sovereignties, and the Catalan authorities confronted him during the Reapers' War. The title of Count of Barcelona was transferred by the Catalan Courts to the House of Bourbon in France. |

=== House of Bourbon, 1641–1659 ===
| Name | Portrait | Reign | Notes |
|---|---|---|---|
| Louis I (Louis XIII of France); 27 September 1601 – 14 May 1643 | | 1641–1643 | During the Reapers' War, the States-General (Braços Generals) of the Principality of Catalonia on 21 January 1641 declared the French king Louis XIII Count of Barcelona as Louis I. |
| Louis II (Louis XIV of France); 5 September 1638 – 1 September 1715 | | 1643–1652 and 1697 | He inherits the title of Count of Barcelona from his father during the Reapers' War. In 1652 he renounces the title in favor of Philip III in exchange for the Roussillon. |

=== House of Habsburg (reinstated) 1659–1700 ===
| Name | Portrait | Reign | Notes |
|---|---|---|---|
| Philip III | | 1659 – 17 September 1665 | He was the son of Philip II. He was reinstated as Count of Barcelona. |
| Charles II | | 17 September 1665 – 1 November 1700 | He was the son of Philip III. |

In 1697, French troops under the Duke of Vendôme captured Barcelona, and Louis XIV of France was reinstated as Count of Barcelona for some months. On 9 January 1698, Catalonia (including Barcelona) was returned to Charles II by the Peace of Ryswick.

=== War of the Spanish Succession (1700–1714) ===
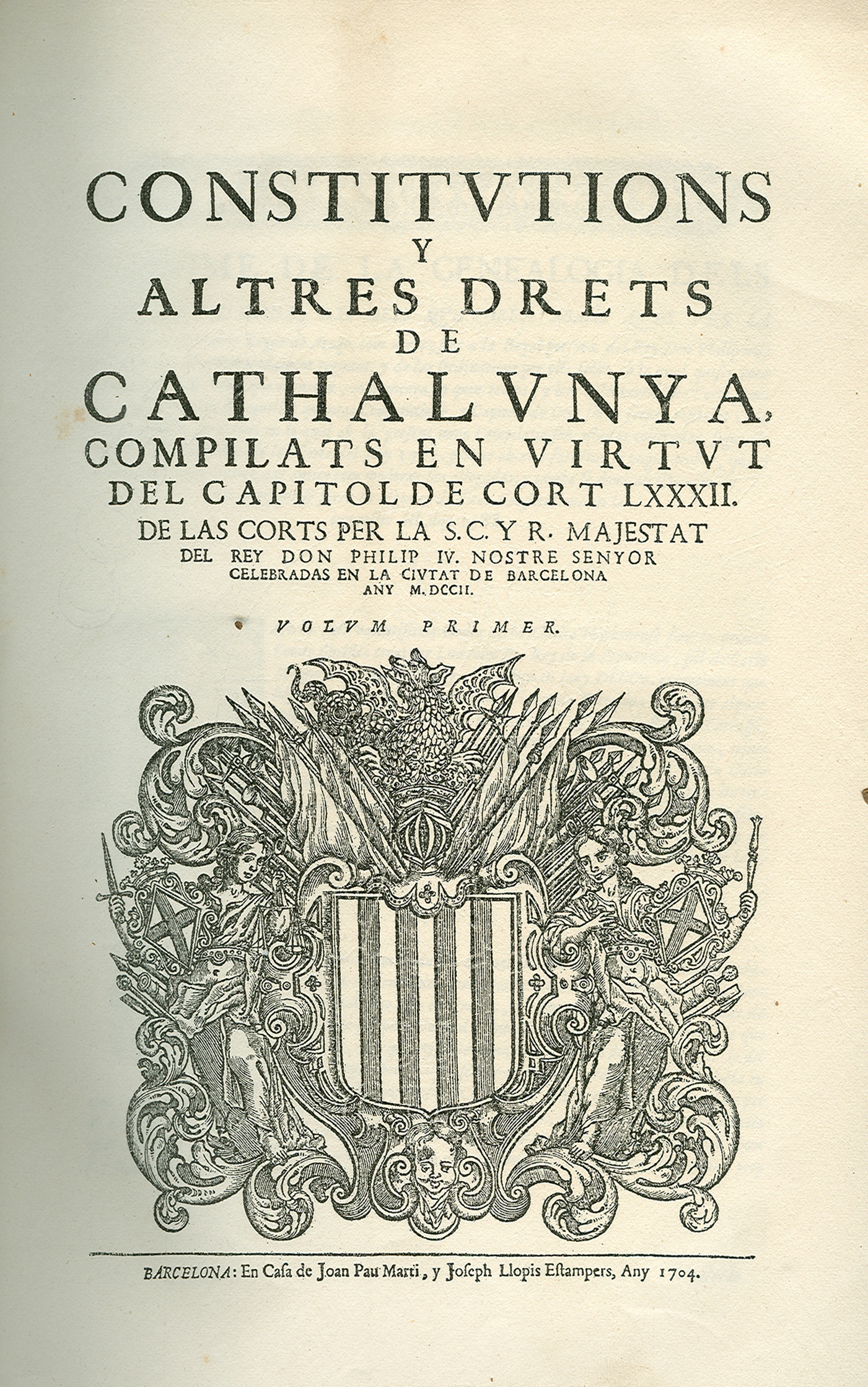
The first page of the Constitutions of Catalonia granted by Philip IV, Count of Barcelona in 1704.

Charles II named as his successor Philip of Anjou, a younger grandson of Louis XIV. The other European powers thought that meant too much power for France. They tried to impose another candidate as King of Spain: Archduke Charles of Austria, in the War of the Spanish Succession. The Catalans were caught in the middle of this major conflict. They initially supported Philip, but then shifted their allegiance to Charles, who was committed to maintaining the composite monarchy system and thus respected the Constitutions of Catalonia. However, Philip won the war.

| Name | Portrait | Reign | Notes |
|---|---|---|---|
| Philip IV | | 1700 – 1705 | He was the great grandson of Philip III. |
| Charles III | | 1705 – 1714 | He was the son of Philip III. |

=== House of Bourbon (Spanish branch) 1714–1808 ===
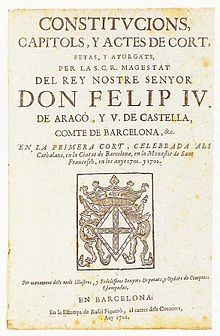
The first page of the Constitutions of Catalonia mentioning Philip V of Spain as 'Felip IV' of Aragon, Count of Barcelona

In 1714, Catalonia, which had supported the Habsburg pretender to the Spanish throne, Archduke Charles of Austria, lost their war within the Spanish war of Succession against the Bourbon pretender Philip of Anjou.

Through the Nueva Planta decrees, Philip of Anjou as the new king of Spain Philip V abolished the Constitutions of Catalonia and dissolved the Crown of Aragon and merged its abolished states with the territories of the Crown of Castile to form the Kingdom of Spain. The Principality of Catalonia became another province and thus the title of Count of Barcelona was emptied of real political significance and power. Since then, the numbering of the Counts of Barcelona follows that of the Crown of Castille. That is the reason why Philip of Anjou was called by the Catalan Authorities 'Felip IV' in 1702 but called himself 'Felipe V' when he seized the title of Count of Barcelona in 1714, after winning the war against the Catalans.

| Name | Portrait | Reign | Notes |
|---|---|---|---|
| Philip V | | 1714 – 15 January 1724 | He was the great grandson of Philip III, previously referred as Philip IV. |
| Louis I | | 15 January 1724 – 31 August 1724 | He was the son of Philip V of Spain. |
| Philip V (second reign) | | 6 September 1724 – 9 July 1746 | Previously referred as Philip IV. |
| Ferdinand VI | | 9 July 1746 – 10 August 1759 | Son of Philip V. |
| Charles III | | 10 August 1759 – 14 December 1788 | Son of Philip V. |
| Charles IV | | 14 December 1788 – 19 March 1808 | Son of Charles III. |
| Ferdinand VII | | 19 March 1808 – 6 May 1808 | Son of Charles IV. |

=== House of Bonaparte 1808–1813 ===
In 1808 Charles IV and his son Ferdinand VII resign from their Crown of Spain titles and transfer them to Emperor Napoleon, who kept for himself the title of Count of Barcelona. By 1812, once he had full military control over the Principality of Catalonia, he separated it from the Crown of Spain and annexed it to the French Empire.

| Name | Portrait | Reign | Notes |
|---|---|---|---|
| Napoleon I, Emperor | | 1808–1813 | Napoleon annexed Catalonia to the French Empire as 4 new departments. |

=== House of Bourbon (restored) 1813–1868 ===
| Name | Portrait | Reign | Notes |
|---|---|---|---|
| Ferdinand VII (restored) | | 4 May 1814 – 29 September 1833 | Son of Charles IV. |
| Isabella II | | 29 September 1833 – 30 September 1868 | Daughter of Ferdinand VII. |

Isabella of Spain was deposed by a liberal revolution and went into exile.

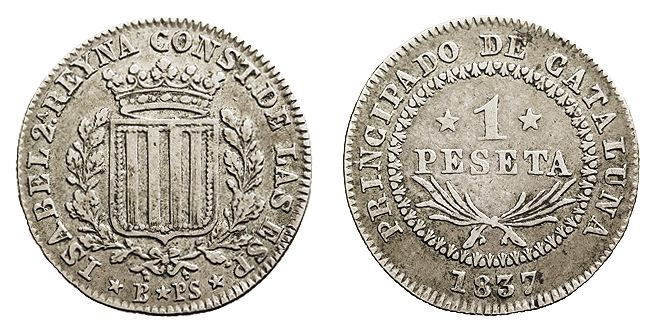
During Isabella's reign the last coinage from the Principality of Catalonia was minted

=== House of Savoy 1870–1873 ===
After a brief Republican period, the Spanish government offered the kingship and its accessory titles (including that of 'Count of Barcelona') to Amadeo Duke of Aosta and son of the king of Italy Victor Emmanuel II.

| Name | Portrait | Reign | Notes |
|---|---|---|---|
| Amadeo I | | 16 November 1870 – 11 February 1873 | After a brief kingship Amadeo abdicated. |

=== House of Bourbon (restored) 1874–1931 ===
A pronunciamiento deposed the Republican government that followed the abdication of Amadeo I and restored the Bourbons as kings of Spain.

| Name | Portrait | Reign | Notes |
|---|---|---|---|
| Alfonso XII | | 29 December 1874 – 25 November 1885 | Son of Isabella II. |
| Alfonso XIII | | 17 May 1886 – 14 April 1931 | Son of Alfonso XII. |

In the 12 April 1931 municipal elections, the Republicans short of winning a majority of councilors overall, won a sweeping majority in major cities. These elections were perceived as a plebiscite on the monarchy, and the king left the country and the Second Spanish Republic was proclaimed on 14 April 1931.

=== House of Bourbon (in exile) 1931–1975 ===
During the 2nd Spanish Republic and Francoist Dictatorship the Bourbons remained in exile and retained their dynastic titles, including 'Count of Barcelona'.

| Name | Portrait | Reign | Notes |
|---|---|---|---|
| Alfonso XIII (in exile) | | 14 April 1931 – 28 February 1941 | The deposed and exiled king kept the Crown of Spain and its associated titles. |
| Juan, Count of Barcelona (claimant in exile as Juan III) | | 15 January 1941 – 22 November 1975 | Son of Alfonso XIII. To assert his claim to the throne, after his father's death, he used the title of Count of Barcelona. |

=== House of Bourbon (restored) 1975 – present day ===
Although on 26 July 1947, Spain was declared a kingdom, no monarch was designated until 1969, when Franco established Juan Carlos of Bourbon as his official heir. With the death of Franco on 20 November 1975, Juan Carlos became the King of Spain.

| Name | Portrait | Reign | Notes |
|---|---|---|---|
| Juan, Count of Barcelona (Juan III) | | 1977 – 1993 | In 1977 his son Juan Carlos I officially granted him the title of Count of Barcelona as a courtesy in exchange for renouncing his claim to the Spanish throne. |
| Juan Carlos I | | 22 November 1975 – 1977 | Grandson of Alfonso XIII. Recovered the title of Count of Barcelona after his father's death. He abdicated in favor of his son Felipe. |
| Felipe VI | | 19 June 2014 – Present | Current King of Spain and Count of Barcelona (amongst other titles). |

== See also ==
- List of Aragonese monarchs
- List of Spanish monarchs
- List of Viscounts of Barcelona
