= Prince of Gothia =

Title of nobility

The title Prince of Gothia (princeps Gothiæ) or Prince of the Goths (princeps Gothorum) was a title of nobility, sometimes assumed by its holder as a sign of supremacy in the region of Gothia and sometimes bestowed by the sovereign of West Francia to the principal nobleman in the south of the realm, in the ninth and tenth centuries. Sometimes hereditary and sometimes not, the title has been rendered in English as Duke (or Margrave) of Septimania (dux Septimaniæ) or Duke (or Margrave) of Gothia (Gothiæ marchio). A similar or the same "office" was often held with the title comes marcæ Hispanicæ: "Count (or Margrave) of the Spanish March." The title was also a chronicler's device and, as presented in some chronicles, may never have been used in any official capacity.

The first employer of the title "Duke of Septimania" was William of Gellone, who acted as Charlemagne's chief official and missus in the region. He was succeeded by Berengar the Wise, who also used the ducal-margravial title. He in turn was succeeded by Bernard of Septimania, who is called comes marcæ Hispanicæ in the Annales Bertiniani. He ruled over both the County of Toulouse and that of Barcelona on the other side of the Pyrenees. They had independent histories after the Moorish conquest of Iberia, but were both Visigothic in population. The Marca Hispanica corresponded to the Gothic lands on the other side of the Pyrenees to the east of the Navarre. The marca was evidently considered a political unity composed of several counties. In the civil wars in the region which followed Bernard's downfall and death in 844, the title went into abeyance.

Sometime around 858, Charles the Bald granted Humfrid several Catalan counties and the title Gothiæ marchio, signifying the same supremacy over the Hispanic march that Bernard had held years earlier. In 862, Humfrid was deposed and probably about that time, Bernard Plantapilosa was appointed to his place as margrave of Gothia. Sometime before 876, he too was deposed and replaced by Bernard II of Poitou. This Bernard was known as "Bernard of Gothia," but his attempt to usurp authority in Gothia was met with stiff punishment by his sovereign and he was out of power by 877. In the early 880s, Charles the Fat employed three marchiones to act as viceroys in the major parts of his realm that he did not regularly visit. Bernard Plantapilos returned to favour and ruled again in Gothia and probably also Provence and Catalonia, perhaps all Aquitaine.

In 932, Rudolph of France revived the title and bestowed it (princeps Gothiæ) on the brothers Ermengol of Rouergue and Raymond Pons of Toulouse. The change in title from marchio to princeps was indicative of the change in political structure and the increasing independence of the great magnates from the royal power in the tenth century. The brothers succeeded in passing the titles princeps and marchio on to their descendants, but the title had little meaning after that. William III of Toulouse, marchio prefatus in pago Tholosano ("prefect margrave in the Toulousain country"), also became Margrave of Provence.

== Princes of Gothia ==
- William of Gellone (abdicated 806)
- Berengar the Wise (806 – 837)
- Bernard of Septimania (837 – 844)
- Humfrid (858 – 862)
- Bernard Plantapilosa (863 – 876)
- Bernard of Gothia (876 – 877)
- Bernard Plantapilosa (884 – 885)
- Ermengol of Rouergue (932 – 937)
- Raymond Pons of Toulouse (932 – 950)
- Raymond II of Rouergue (937 – 965)
- Raymond of Toulouse (950 – 978)
- Raymond III of Rouergue (965 – 1008)
- William Taillefer (978 – 1037)
- Raymond IV (1041 - 1105) Prince of Gothia begun to be called "Marquis of Gothia" a title which he bore as a leader of the First Crusade. As a Count of Toulouse he was of the Peerage of France which had equal rank to the King of the Franks.
