= Berengar the Wise =

Berengar, called the Wise (Catalan: Berenguer el Savi, Latin: Berengarius Sapiens), was the duke or count of Toulouse (814–835) and duke (or margrave) of Septimania (832–835). He held the County of Barcelona concomitantly with Septimania.

Berengar was a member of the family of the Unrochids. He was the son of Unruoch II of Friuli and Ingeltrude and brother of Eberhard. His nephew was the Holy Roman Emperor Berengar.

In 814, Louis the Pious installed Berengar as Count of Toulouse in succession to Raymond Raphinel who had been appointed by Charlemagne. He was also a councillor of Pepin I of Aquitaine in 816. In 819, he and Guerin, Count of Auvergne, fought against the usurping Duke of Gascony, Lupo III Centule. Berengar appears as a missus dominicus of Louis in May 825 and then in 827 in the six counties of Rheims, Soissons, Senlis, Beauvais, Laon, and Catolonis and the four bishoprics of Amiens, Cambrai, Saint-Pol-sur-Ternoise, and Noviomacensem.

In November 831, Pepin revolted against his father, with Berengar advising him not to rebel, but with Bernard of Septimania inciting him. In the beginning of 832, Louis the Pious began campaigning against his rebellious son. Berengar, loyal to the Emperor, attacked the domains of Bernard, taking Roussillon (with Vallespir), Razès, and Conflent. On 2 February, Berengar had already reached Elna. Finally, in the autumn of the same year, successive victories by the imperial forces compelled Pepin and Bernard to appear before the Emperor (October) to plead for peace. Pepin was dispossessed of his kingdom and sent, as a prisoner, to Trier. His territories were given to Charles the Bald, youngest son of the Emperor. Bernard was accused of infidelity and dispossessed of all his lands in Septimania and Gothia; they were given to Berengar. Gaucelm, Bernard's brother, was also dispossessed of the majority of his lands, but for a time kept the Empúries although this too was lost to Berengar later.

In 833, Aznar I Galíndez, Count of Urgell and Cerdanya, usurped the counties of Pallars and Ribagorza from under Berengar's rule. In 834, when another rebellious son of the emperor, Lothair, was defeated, Bernard, having fought on the side of Louis with Pepin, reclaimed his old domains as the price of his support. The lands were passed to Bernard and Berengar was weakened. As a result Berengar's Pyrenean lands were confiscated unlawfully and redistributed by the imperial crown to others. His Catalan grants were taken away and given to his old enemy. He was left with nothing but the County of Toulouse after fighting loyally for the old emperor and the successful Pepin.

In June 835, Bernard and Berengar were summoned to an Assembly at Crémieu, near Lyon, where a decision would be made about the distribution of lands in Septimania and Gothia, but on the way Berengar died unexpectedly. Thus the decision was simplified, and the Emperor gave the region's counties to Bernard and Toulouse to Guerin.

Preceded by Raymond Raphinel	Count of Toulouse; 814–835	Succeeded by Guerin
Preceded by Bernard	Count of Barcelona; 832–835	Succeeded by Bernard
Preceded by Gaucelm	Count of Empúries; 832–835	Succeeded by Sunyer I
