= Bellver Castle =

- Palma de Mallorca, Spain
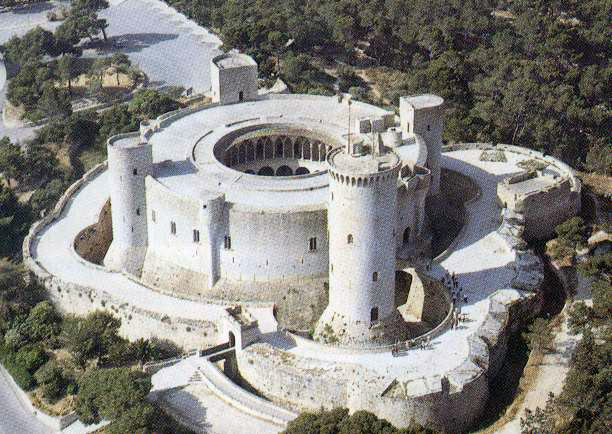
- Aerial view of the castle

Site information
- Owner: Palma de Mallorca City Council

Location
- Coordinates: 39.56375°N 2.619338°E
- Height: 112 m

Site history
- Built: 1311
- Built by: Pere Salvà
- Materials: Marès

Spanish Cultural Heritage
- Official name: Castillo de Bellver
- Type: Non-movable
- Criteria: Monument
- Designated: June 3, 1931
- Reference no.: RI-51-0000411

Bellver Castle (Catalan: Castell de Bellver [kəsˈteʎ də ˌbeʎˈvə]) is a Gothic-style castle on a hill 3 km to the west of the center of Palma de Mallorca on the island of Mallorca, Balearic Islands, Spain. It was built in the 14th century for King James II of Majorca, and is one of the few circular castles in Europe. First serving as the residence of the Kings of Majorca, and afterward long used as a military prison throughout the 18th to mid-20th century, it is now under civilian control, being one of the main tourist attractions of the island, as well as the seat for the city's History Museum.

== Origins and evolution ==
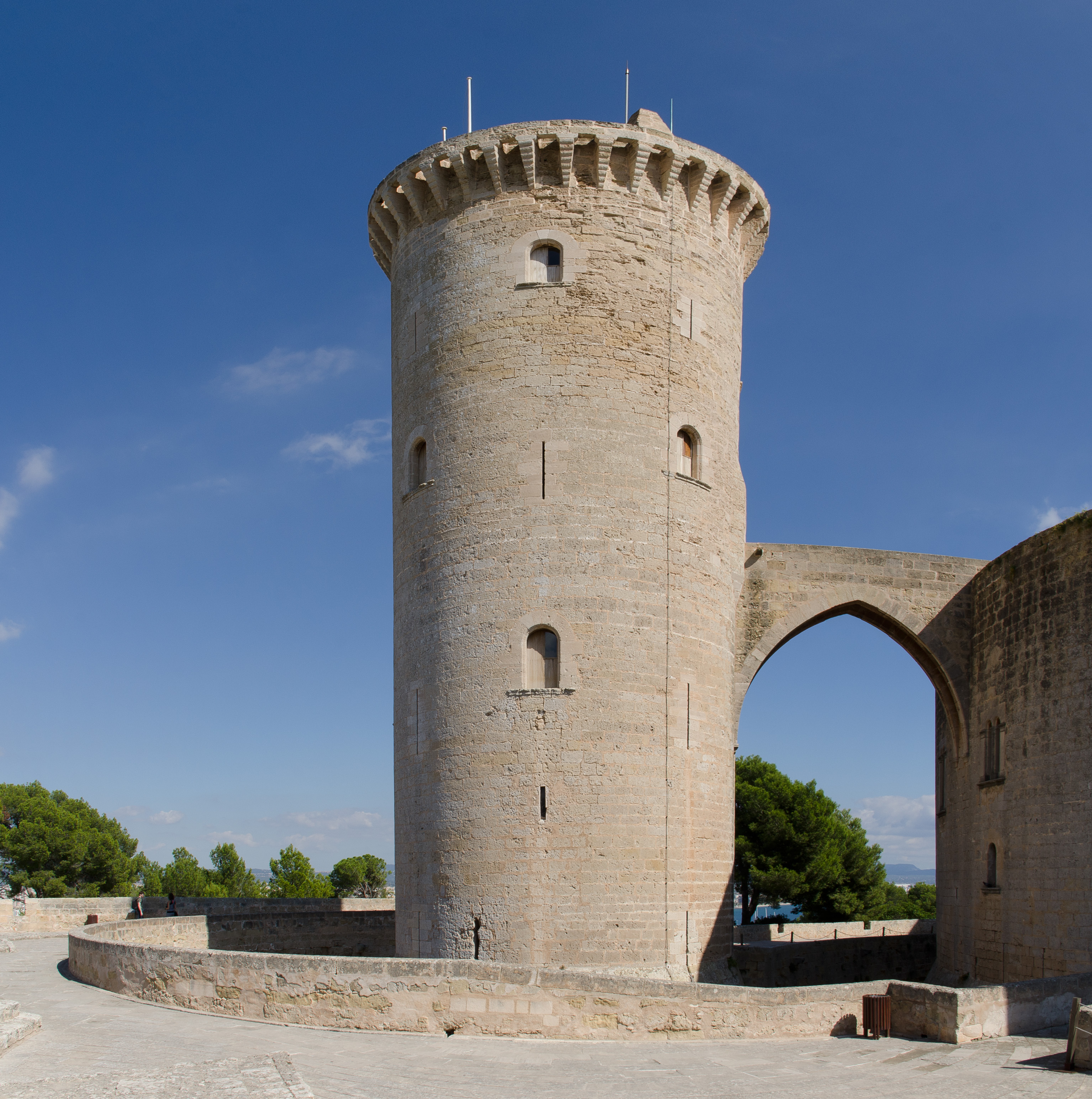
Donjon of the Bellver Castle.

The castle's plan, a circular floor with round towers attached to it, somewhat like the Herodion, a 15 BCE hilltop palace in the West Bank, that was also circular and had a large principal tower and three minor towers as well. They are attached while the principal one is coupled to the complex by a high bridge over the surrounding moat.

The Castle has clear Islamic influences in its original design, displaying double Arches characteristic of Moorish architecture, a part of the fortification was built by architect Pere Salvà, who also worked in the construction of the Royal Palace of La Almudaina, together with other master masons between 1300 and 1311 for King James II of Aragon and Majorca. Rock from the hill where the castle sits was used for the building, which has eventually led to the appearance of cracks. Once the castle had been built, and following the introduction of artillery, the battlements on the top balconies and the barbican disappeared, being soon followed by those in every tower; loopholes were built instead.

== History ==
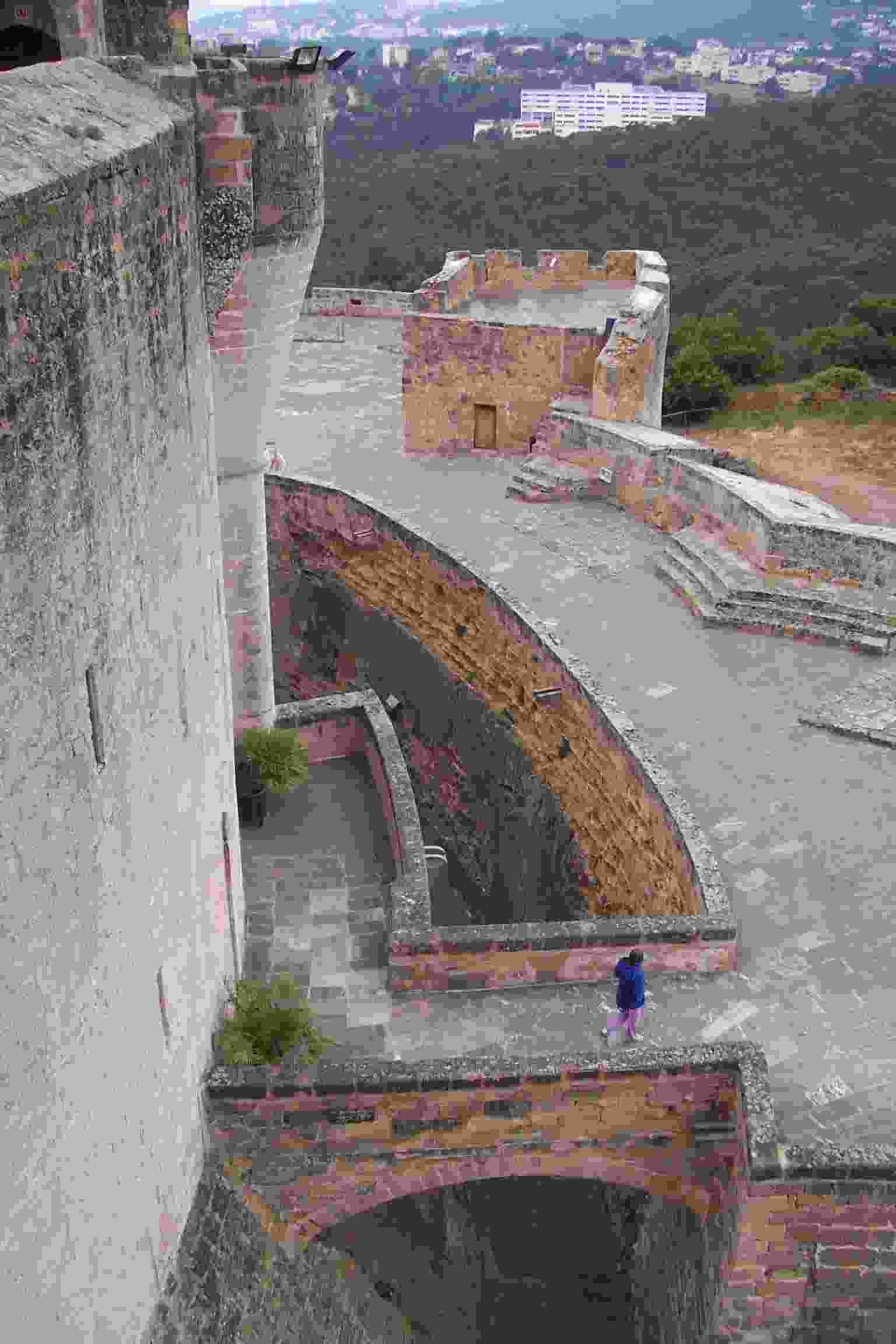
Internal portal, valley, revellí and eaves at the background

The castle originally served as a residence for the Kings of Mallorca after the conquest of Majorca from the Almohad Caliphate Taifa of Majorca, whenever they were not staying in mainland Europe, and was subsequently rarely used as a residence for viceroys during the 17th century. As a fortification, it suffered and successfully resisted two sieges during the Middle Ages; the first of them in 1343, during Peter IV of Aragon's campaign to reincorporate the Majorcan territories to the Crown of Aragon, and then again in 1391 during an anti-semitic peasant revolt. The castle has only fallen once in its history into enemy hands, in 1521 after an assault during the Majorcan second Revolt of the Brotherhoods.

The castle was usually governed by a Lord Warden. In 1408, King Martin I of Aragon gave the lordship of Bellver to the Charterhouse of Jesus of Nazareth in Valldemossa. Charles of Viana arrived in 1459 to take possession of both the island and the castle, as he had agreed with his father King John II of Aragon, even though the King did not grant the lordship or Bellver Castle.

Being an enclosed site, since the end of the 14th century, it was used as a prison to hold Queen Violante of Vilaragut, her stepchildren James and Isabella and other supporters of King James III of Mallorca after his death in the Battle of Llucmajor in 1349. During the War of Spanish Succession, it was used to imprison first supporters of Philip of Anjou, and after the Bourbon victory, Maulets (supporters of the Habsburg pretender). During the Spanish Independence War, it was used to hold several prisoners captured at the Battle of Bailén and later, political prisoners, the most famous of these being the minister Gaspar Melchor de Jovellanos (1802–1808) who first made a description of the castle and commissioned the original blueprints and drawings of it. The castle served from then on as a political prison, used to lock up several important supporters of the subsequent Habsburg pretenders to the Spanish throne in the 19th century, and later notable republican and Catalanist leaders during the 20th century, including Alexandre Jaume, Member of the Parliament who first won the castle for the city, and Emili Darder, who was the mayor of the city, both subsequently shot.

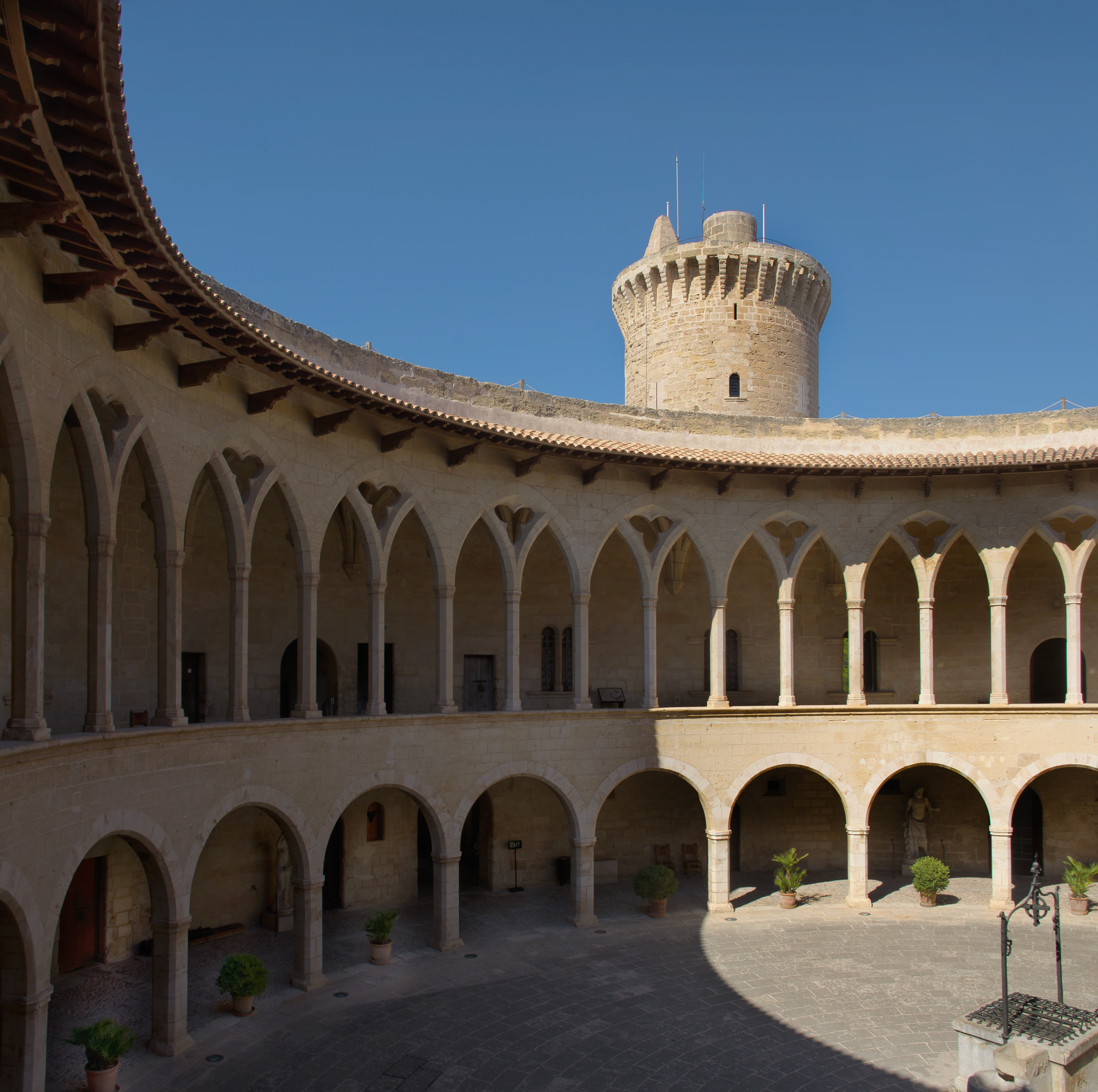
Circular inner yard

Video of the Bellver Castle

== Features ==
Having been founded as a seat for the royal court of James of Mallorca, its structure combines the needs of a palace with defensive elements. The most notable feature in its structure is its circular shape, unique in Mallorca. Both its surrounding wall and the inner yard are so-shaped, along with the three minor towers and the donjon. A moat is found surrounding the castle and its donjon.

The circular inner yard must be highlighted. It has a well in the middle of it, which indicates there is a cistern underneath. The palace itself is structured as a two-story building around the central yard. All its dependencies face this yard through a gallery of gothic semi-circular arches.

== Current uses ==
In 1931, the Spanish Second Republic gave the castle to the city of Palma, along with the surrounding forest. It became a museum in 1932, being restored in 1976 to become the city's History museum. The parking lot and road built next to the castle allows for a great number of visitors. The main yard is the seat to many different public ceremonies, such as protocol and cultural acts, and concerts. Due to its location and visibility from the sea or any other point of the city, it has become one of the city's symbols.

The surrounding forest encloses the stables of the city's Mounted Peelers. There is also a chapel dedicated to Saint Alphonsus Rodriguez, built between 1879 and 1885.

On the Sunday following Easter Sunday, the citizens gather at the forest and the castle for the celebration of the Diumenge de l'Àngel.

== See also: other circular castles ==
- Blue Tower (Gorinchem)
- Queenborough Castle
