= County of Roussillon =

Medieval Catalonian county (759–1172)

County of Roussillon Comtat de Rosselló (Catalan)
- 759–1172
- The County of Roussillon and other Catalan counties
- Capital: Perpignan
- Religion: Roman Catholic
- Government: County
- Historical era: Middle Ages
  - Establishment: 759
  - Annexed into the Principality of Catalonia: 1172
Preceded by	Succeeded by
Emirate of Córdoba	Principality of Catalonia
- Today part of: France

The County of Roussillon (Catalan: Comtat de Rosselló, IPA: [kumˈtad də rusəˈʎo], Latin: Comitatus Ruscinonensis) was one of the Catalan counties in the Marca Hispanica during the Middle Ages. The rulers of the county were the counts of Roussillon, whose interests lay both north and south of the Pyrenees.

The historic county's lands today lie within the borders of France.

== Visigothic county ==
There was a Visigothic county around the city of Ruscino in the 6th and 7th centuries with a jurisdiction corresponding to the Diocese of Elna. This early county comprising the historic comarques of Plana del Roselló, Conflent, and Vallespir was created by Visigothic king Liuva I in 571. The Visigothic legacy in Roussillon survived in its courts, where Visigothic law was applied exclusively as late as the 11th century.

Roussillon was occupied by the Moors in 721. It was probably conquered for the Frankish Empire by Pepin the Short and his Visigothic allies in 760, immediately following his conquest of Narbonne, though all that is certain is that it was in Frankish hands during the reign of Charlemagne. By that point, Roussillon had been nearly completely depopulated, was not widely cultivated, and land use was very inefficient, which has often been explained by Moorish razzias and Frankish reprisals over a span of forty years.

Pepin reestablished the old Gothic county with its seat at Ruscino. The new count—a Goth—built a castle at their capital: the castrum or castellum Rossilio, by which Ruscino came to be known as Castell-Rosselló. Beginning in 780, Charlemagne started granting aprisiones of unpopulated land in Roussillon and around Narbonne to incoming spani (or hispani, that is, Christian Spaniards of Gothic, Roman, and Basque origin). These spani migrants, along with the native Gothic aristocracy, took part in the reconquest of the southern slopes of the Pyrenees and the Tarraconensian littoral which formed the new Marca Hispanica.

== Union with Empúries ==
The history of the Frankish county in the 8th and 9th centuries is not well known. In the Carolingian age, it may have formed the westernmost extent of non-Basque settlement in the Pyrenees. It was affected by the second wave of monasticism which swept Catalonia in the first half of the 9th century and saw the foundation and imperial recognition of new monasteries, as at Saint-Genesius des Fonts, Saint-Clement de Regulla, and Saint-André de Sureda in 819 and 823 respectively. In 859–860, a fleet of Vikings under Hasting and Bjorn plundered the abbeys of Roussillon before wintering in the Camargue.

The first count known by name, Gaucelm, received the County of Empúries in 817. The counties of Roussillon and Empúries remained united until 989. However, they probably had separate viscounts. The office of viscount appeared in Roussillon early when a Richelm is mentioned as filling it in 859. The original viscounts acted as missi dominici of the margraves of Septimania. Throughout this period, Roussillon gradually gained de facto independence from its nominal suzerain, the king of France. As late as 878, Louis the Stammerer could enforce his will in the selection of Roussillon's count, but by the end of the 9th century the royal writ rarely ran as far south as the Pyrenees. The counties of Roussillon and Empúries became relatively stable, hereditary possessions of the Bellonid family; Gausfred I even took the title dux (duke) in 975.

Late in the 10th century, Alt Rosselló, Conflent, and inland Vallespir passed to the counts of Cerdanya and Roussillon was reduced to the coastal regions of Roussillon and Vallespir. Throughout the century, Empúries was the centre of comital power and the counts had their seat there. It was only when Viking and Moorish pirates forced him to move from the coast to the more easily defensible inland that Gausfred I made his capital at Castelló d'Empúries. After his death, the counties were separated, with Roussillon going to his younger son, Giselbert I.

The division, however, was made under certain stipulations of the deceased count. First, both counts had a right to attend the synods and tribunals held in either county. Second, rights of justice were shared between the two counts. Third, the count of Roussillon had the right to make his residence in Empúries, the ancient capital. And finally, that either count could possess lands in either county. In 1014, Hugh I of Empúries invaded Roussillon, but in 1019 a pact was signed making the two counties permanently separate entities.

== Treuga Dei ==
Roussillon was the site of the first promulgation of the Truce of God (treuga Dei). In 1027, a council of Elna was held in the meadow of Toulouges, because the throng of attendees was so great: clergymen, aristocrats, and poor men and women. The council first decreed a series of canons in keeping with the Peace of God (pax Dei) movement inaugurated at Charroux Abbey in 989 and which had spread across Aquitaine, Gascony, the Languedoc, and Catalonia like wildfire. The Elna council, however, went a step further than previous local councils. It also declared a truce effective from Saturday evening until Monday morning each week: "No one dwelling in the aforesaid county and diocese [of Roussillon] should assail any enemy of his from the ninth hour on Saturday to the first hour on Monday, so that everyone may render the honour owed to the Lord's day." The truce spread rapidly through Languedoc and was soon extended so that it was generally understood that fighting was prohibited between Wednesday evening and dawn Monday.

== Independent Roussillon ==
Giselbert moved the capital of Roussillon from Castellrosellón to a village named Perpignan, which was destined to be the first city of Roussillon, in preference to the episcopal seat of Elna. Giselbert II made a pact with Empúries concerning military and ecclesiastical possessions. During this period, Roussillon fell more under the influence of the count of Toulouse to its north than the count of Barcelona to its south, contrary to the path of most of the Catalan counties. It also suffered under a series of coastal raids by the navy of the taifa kingdom of Denia.

In the mid-12th century, under Gausfred III, Roussillon experienced an epoch of turbulence with increased attacks from both Empúries and Moorish pirates. Gausfred's eldest son also rebelled. In order to quell his son's revolt, he made him Lord of Perpignan and heir apparent.

On the death of Gerard II without heirs in 1172, Roussillon passed, as per prior agreement of the nobles with the count, to Alfonso II of Aragon. It was thought that the Crown of Aragon could protect Roussillon from the pretensions of Empúries, which still possessed certain communal rights in Roussillon. In 1173, Alfonso called an assembly at Perpignan, where he declared a peace for all Roussillon and the diocese of Elna.

== Roussillon in the Crown of Aragon ==
Roussillon was, along with Cerdanya and Conflent, the subject of a major cartulary under Alfonso II or perhaps Peter II: the Liber feudorum Ceritaniae. It is a record of charters, usually related to castle- and land-holding in the three counties, from the archive of the counts of Barcelona.

Surely as a reaction to the threat posed by the anti-Cathar crusade in Languedoc led by French nobles, King Peter II of Aragon granted around 1209 to his uncle Sancho the county of Roussillon, including Conflent and those territories of upper Roussillon and Vallespir that had been part of the County of Besalú. Therefore, the county of Roussillon again coincided with the Diocese of Elna. Sancho I of Roussillon-Cerdanya, was succeeded by his son Nuño Sánchez, on whose death in 1242, his Counties reverted to the Crown of Aragon.

In his will of 1261, King James I of Aragon stipulated that the Counties of Roussillon and Cerdanya were to become part of the Kingdom of Mallorca, which would correspond to his second son James, being separated from Aragon, Catalonia and Valencia which would be for his eldest son Peter. From then on, the infante James administered his future kingdom as a Governor. On the death of James I in 1276, this testament was put into practice, and the counties of Roussillon and Cerdanya came under the control of King James II of Mallorca (1276–1311), who made Perpignan the second capital of the Kingdom.

The County of Roussillon, and the rest of the Kingdom of Mallorca, was reunited with the Kingdom of Aragon after a military campaign in 1343-1344 by King Peter IV of Aragon.

Between 1462 and 1492, the County of Roussillon was occupied by France.
At the outbreak of the Catalan Civil War, in the Treaty of Bayonne, King John II of Aragon ceded to King Louis XI of France the jurisdiction, rights and income of the counties of Roussillon and Cerdagne, as long as the King of Aragon did not make effective the payment of 200,000 escudos, in exchange for Louis XI providing him with military aid to subdue the rest of Catalonia. When the War ended in 1472, France had switched sides and had supported the Council of the Principality of Catalonia. John II of Aragon invaded Roussillon and Cerdagne to expel the French, but didn't succeed after 3 years of fighting.

Finally, Roussillon and Cerdagne were returned to Aragon in the Treaty of Barcelona (1493), as a price for Ferdinand II of Aragon's promise to maintain neutrality during Charles VIII of France's forthcoming invasion of the Kingdom of Naples.

166 years later, in the Treaty of the Pyrenees (1659), the County of Roussillon was definitively ceded to the Kingdom of France.

== Sources ==
- Bisson, Thomas N. "Une paix peu connue pour le Roussillon (A.D. 1173)." Droit Privé et Institutions Régionales. Études Historiques Offertes à Jean Yver (Paris, 1976), pp. 69–76. Reprinted in Medieval France and her Pyrenean Neighbours: Studies in Early Institutional History (London: Hambledon, 1989), pp. 179–86.
- Lewis, Archibald Ross. The Development of Southern French and Catalan Society, 718–1050. University of Texas Press: Austin, 1965.
- Jordan, William Chester. Europe in the High Middle Ages. London: Viking, 2003.
