= Hugh I of Empúries =

Spanish noble and count

Hugh I (Spanish: Hugo, Catalan: Hug) (c. 965 – 1040), Count of Empúries (Ampurias) from 991, was the son of Gausfred I and his first wife, Ava, daughter of Raymond II of Rouergue.

By the testament of his father, dated 969, Hugh was to receive the county of Ampurias while his brother Giselbert received that of Roussillon. The division took place on the death of Gausfred, but on the death of Giselbert in 1014, Hugh tried to reunify the counties and invaded the county of his nephew, Gausfred II. Gausfred obtained the help of Bernard I of Besalú and the Abbot Oliva and the two relations arrived to a peace in 1020.

Hugh made a career of harassing his neighbours. Ermesinde of Carcassonne, the widow of Ramon Borrell, Count of Barcelona, reclaimed the allod of Ullastrell, which had been sold by Borrell and subsequently invaded by Hugh. In 1019, a judicial synod in Girona, presided over by Oliva and Bernard, devolved the allod to Ermesinda. At about this time, Hugh made enemies of the church by seizing the monastery of San Salvador de Verdera.

Preceded by Gausfred I	Count of Empúries; 991–1040	Succeeded by Ponç I
