= Sunyer =

Sunyer (Catalan) or Suñer/Suniario (Spanish), from Latin Suniarius, possibly from Proto-Germanic *sunjō ("truth, protest"), may refer to:

- Sunyer, Count of Barcelona (870–950)
- Sunyer I of Empúries (834–848)
- Sunyer II of Empúries (862–915)
- Sunyer I of Pallars (948–1010)
- Joaquim Sunyer (1874–1956), Catalan artist

== See also ==
- Sunyer, Lleida, a municipality in the comarca of Segrià, Catalonia
