= Sunyer I =

Sunyer I may refer to:

- Sunyer I, Count of Empúries
- Sunyer I of Pallars
- Sunyer, Count of Barcelona
