= Counts of Roussillon =

This is a list of the counts of Roussillon (Catalan: Comtes de Rosselló, French: Comtes de Roussillon, Latin: Comites Ruscinonensis) who ruled over the eponymous County of Roussillon.

== Carolingian counts ==
These counts were nominated by the Carolingian kings of France, of whom they were vassals.

- Gaucelm (812–832)

Hereafter, also counts of Barcelona.

- Berenguer of Toulouse (832–835)
- Bernat of Septimania (835–844)
- Sunifred I, also known as Sunyer, (844–848)
- Guillem (848–850)
- Aleran (850–852)
- Odalric (852–858)
- Humfrid (858–864)
- Bernat of Gothia (865–878)

No longer counts of Barcelona.

- Miro the Elder (878–895)

== Independent counts ==
These counts were also counts of Empúries. By this time the counts were practically independent.

- Sunifred II (895–915)
- Bencion (915–916)
- Gausbert (915–931)
- Gausfred I, also known as Wilfred, (931–991)

The counts hereafter were no longer counts of Empúries.

- Giselbert I, also known as Guislabert, (991–1014)
- Gausfred II (1014–1074)
- Giselbert II (1074–1102)
- Girard I, also known as Guinard, (1102–1113)
- Gausfred III (1113–1164)
- Girard II (1164–1172), died without heirs

After Girard II, the county of Roussillon was subsumed within the Crown of Aragón. Later, the title was briefly revived.

- Sancho (1209–1223), also count of Cerdanya
- Nuño Sancho (1223–1242), also count of Cerdanya

Nuño Sancho died without issue and Roussillon was subsumed by

- King James I of Aragon (1242–1276).

Before dying in 1276, he gave Roussillon to his second surviving son James, who also became King of Majorca. For subsequent counts of Roussillon (and Cerdanya), see Kingdom of Majorca (1276–1344).

The County of Roussillon, and the rest of the Kingdom of Mallorca, was reunited with the Kingdom of Aragon after a military campaign in 1343-1344 by King Peter IV of Aragon.

- French occupation (1462–1492). The County of Roussillon was occupied by France, but returned to Aragon in the Treaty of Barcelona (1493).

In the Treaty of the Pyrenees (1659), the County of Roussillon was definitively ceded to the Kingdom of France.

== French counts ==
=== Louis of Bourbon ===
Louis of Bourbon (1450–1487) was the first French Count of Roussillon. He was an illegitimate son of Charles I, Duke of Bourbon and Jeanne Bournan. In 1463, he was legitimated by letters patent. He was known for his many services to the Kingdom of France and was made an Admiral of France. Jeanne de Valois, Dame de Mirabeau et d'Usson en Auvergne, illegitimate daughter of Louis XI and Félizé Regnard, was given in marriage to Louis, by her father. Louis XI legitimated Jeanne in 1466. The marriage of Jeanne and Louis produced three children: Charles de Bourbon-Roussillon, 2nd comte de Roussillon; Suzanne, Countess of Roussillon and Ligny; and Anne, Dame de Mirabeau. Louis of Bourbon died on 19 January 1487 and was buried in the church of the Franciscan monastery of Valognes, which he founded.

== Fictional counts ==
- A fictional Count of Roussillon, Bertram, is a principal character in William Shakespeare's play All's Well That Ends Well.

== See also ==
- County of Roussillon
