= Thomàs Périz de Fozes =

Thomàs Périz de Fozes (or Thomas Periz in original orthography) was an Aragonese troubadour of the knightly class, who has left two poems in the Occitan language. His mother tongue was evidently Aragonese. His Occitan is the literary koiné of the classical era of the troubadours (1160–1220) and was apparently learned: it is in general grammatically and rhythmically perfect asides from a few errors of declension caused by his greater familiarity with Aragonese.

Thomàs is mentioned among the barons of Aragon in a sirventes of Joan de Castellnou, which is sufficient to show that he was considered an exemplar of the practice of courtly love between the years 1339 and 1343. In 1339 he was a counsellor of Peter IV of Aragon, who named him administrator of the Val d'Aran and castellan of Castell-lleons. Through his brother, Artal de Fozes, who married Esclaramonda, daughter of Sancho, an illegitimate brother of King James III of Majorca, Thomàs was related by marriage to the younger branch of the royal House of Barcelona. His brother's second wife (1371) and widow, Sibil•la de Fortià, was a mistress and then wife (1377) of Peter IV.

Thomàs tried to use his influence at court for the benefit of his relatives when, early in 1342, he composed a poem, Trop me desplay can vey falir, petitioning the king for clemency towards James III, whom Peter desired to depose. He admits to the pride and infidelity of James, who had refused to swear fealty to Peter, but urges that he should not lose everything for a moment's folly. Finally, he draws on the magnanimity of Peter's paternal and maternal lineages, which earned his father, Alfonso IV, the epithet "the Benign", in a direct appeal to the king to spare his vassal. In the end, James III died at the Battle of Llucmajor in 1349.

Thomàs' second poem, Si col vassayl can servex longamen, is a canso addressed to a Na Resplendens (Resplendent Lady) mentioned in the second tornada of his earlier poem. This senhal (code name) refers to an unknown lady of high rank. The main theme of the poem is the poet's need to "seize the day" (carpe diem):

Valetz-me, donchs, mentre jovens m'avança, d'un joy, qu'estiers, can torn en veylezir, covendrà'm, las, tot joy d'amor jaquir, e viuré puys am trista desirança.	Help me, then, while youth recedes, to joy, because otherwise, as I begin to age I must, alas!, all joy of love abandon, and live thereafter with melancholy desire.
