= Sunyer II of Empúries =

Frankish nobleman

Sunyer II (c. 840–915) was the count of Empúries from 862 and Roussillon from 896 until his death. He was the son of Sunyer I of Empúries.

He and his brother Dela obtained the county of Empúries in 862 after Humfrid, margrave of Gothia, rebelled. They governed it together until Dela's death. In 878, the council of Troyes deposed Bernat of Gothia, who had held Roussillon since 865. It was given to Miro the Elder and, in 896, when Miro died, it passed by heredity to Sunifred. Together with Dela, he tried to occupy Girona, but their cousin, Wilfred the Hairy, stopped them. In 888, he travelled to Orléans to do homage to King Odo of France. In 891, he prepared a naval expedition to attack Moorish Almería. The campaign, however, ended in a truce.

He married a woman named Ermengarda, with whom he had the following issue:

- Bencion (d. 916), successor
- Gausbert (d. 931), successor of his brother
- Elmerat (d. 920), bishop of Elna
- Guadal (d. 947), bishop of Elna

Preceded by Humfrid	Count of Empúries; 862–915	Succeeded by Bencion
Preceded by Miro the Elder	Count of Rosselló; 896–915	Succeeded by Bencion
