= Gerard II =

Gerard II may refer to:

- Gerard II, Count of Guelders (from 1129 to 1131)
- Gerard II of Isenburg-Kempenich (co-Lord in 1329–1330)

== See also ==
- Girard II of Roussillon
