= Gausfred III of Roussillon =

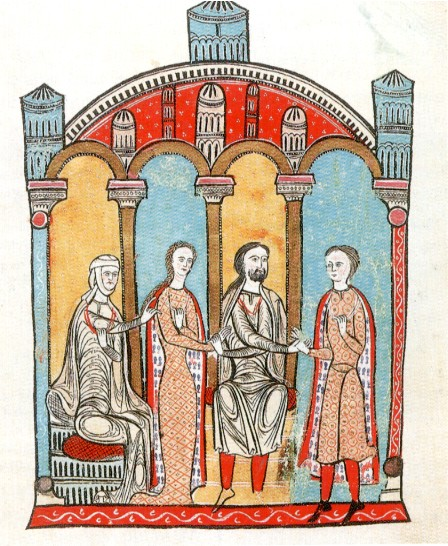
Gausfred (right) is being betrothed to Ermengard, standing between her mother (Cecilia of Provence) and her father (Bernard Ato)

Gausfred III (died 1164) was the count of Roussillon from 1113 until his death. He was the son and successor of Girard I, who was assassinated, leaving Gausfred a child. Arnold Gausfred, the young count's uncle, acted as regent until 1121.

Gausfred maintained disputes with the Trencavel, the viscounts of Béziers. On the other hand, he maintained the friendly relations begun by his grandfather Giselbert II with the counts of Ampurias. A treaty recognising the mutual rights of the two counties was in force between 1121 and 1155.

Gausfred was the suzerain of the troubadour Berenguier de Palazol, who celebrated him in several songs as Jaufres. He married Ermengard, daughter of the Viscount Bernard Ato IV. Their son was his successor, Girard II.

Preceded by Girard I	Count of Roussillon; 1113–1164	Succeeded by Girard II
