= Miro the Elder =

Miro I, called the Old or the Elder (in Catalan, Miró el Vell) was the count of Conflent from 870 and Rosselló (Roussillon) from 878 until his death in 896. He was the son of Sunifred I, count of Barcelona, Urgell, Cerdanya, and Besalú, and Ermesende, and thus the brother of Wilfred the Hairy and Radulf of Besalú.

In 870 Miro received the county of Conflent either directly from his uncle Solomon I, or by transfer via his brother Wilfred, who inherited the counties of Urgell and Cerdanya. In 876, he rebelled against Bernard, Margrave of Gothia, and invaded Rosselló with the help of his brother and Lindoi, viscount of Narbonne. In 878, though condemned for his invasion by Pope John VIII, he was confirmed in his new possession by the king of France, Louis II. He was a protector of the monastery of Saint Andrew of Eixalada and, before it was destroyed by a flood, the monastery of Saint Michael of Cuixà.

He married Quíxol, with whom he had one daughter, Godlana, who married Bencion, son of Count Sunyer II of Empúries. Miro died in 896 and the county of Rosselló passed to Bencion under his father Sunyer. Conflent, and the interior counties of Gothia that had previously been linked with Rosselló (Vallespir, Capcir, and Fenolleda), passed to Wilfred, and upon his death to Miro the Young.

Preceded by Solomon I	Count of Conflent; 870–896	Succeeded by Wilfred the Hairy
Preceded by Bernard of Gothia	Count of Rosselló; 878–896	Succeeded by Sunifred II
