= Blue Tower (Gorinchem) =

Former circular castle in Gorinchem, seat of Charles the Bold, duke of Burgundy

Coordinates: 51.826944°N 4.974167°E

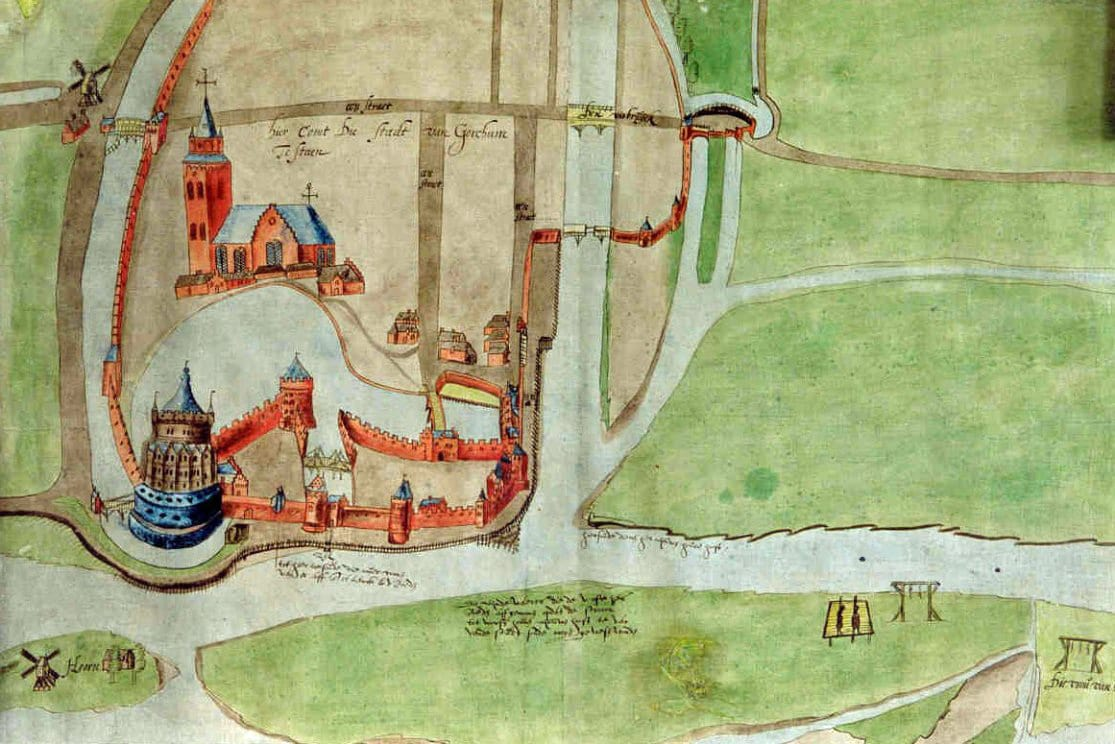
View of the Blue Tower (mid 16th century)

The Blue Tower (Dutch: Kasteel de Blauwe Toren) was a castle with an imposing stone keep in Gorinchem, the Netherlands. It was a princely residence of Charles the Bold, Duke of Burgundy. The complex, which stood there between 1461 and 1578, gained an almost mythical status thanks in part to descriptions by the Gorinchem chronicler Abraham Kemp and the discovery of its foundations in 1983.

It was located at the southwestern side of the city center, at the level of the current Tolsteeg, Duivelsgracht, and Buiten de Waterpoort by the Merwede river.

== History ==
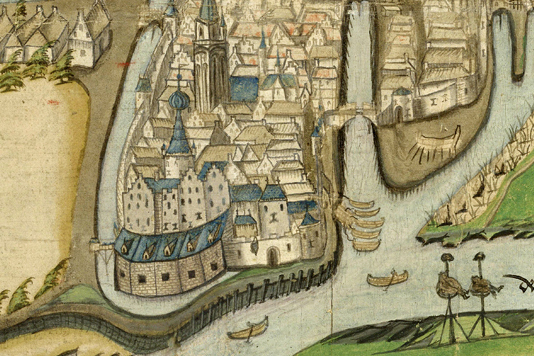
The Blue Tower on a map by Pieter Sluyter (1553)

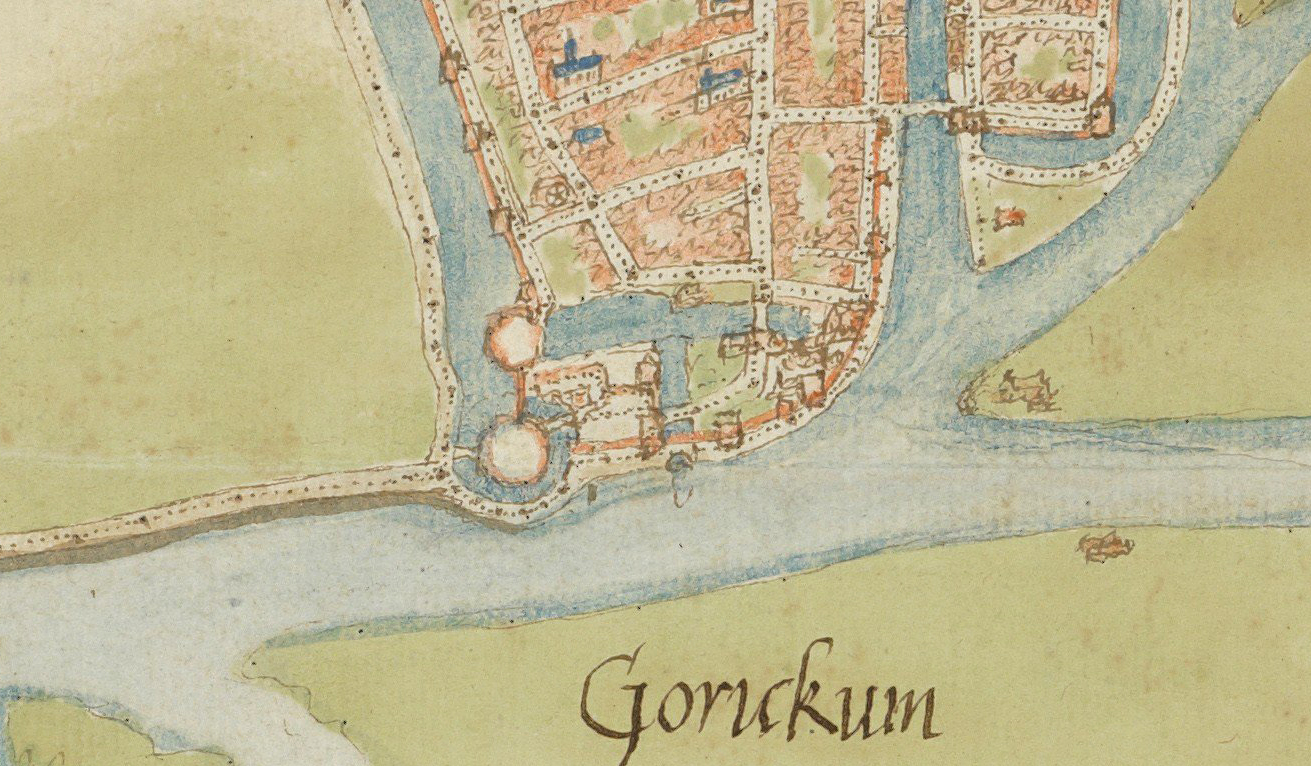
The floor plan of the Blue Tower can be recognized on a map by Jacob van Deventer (1558)

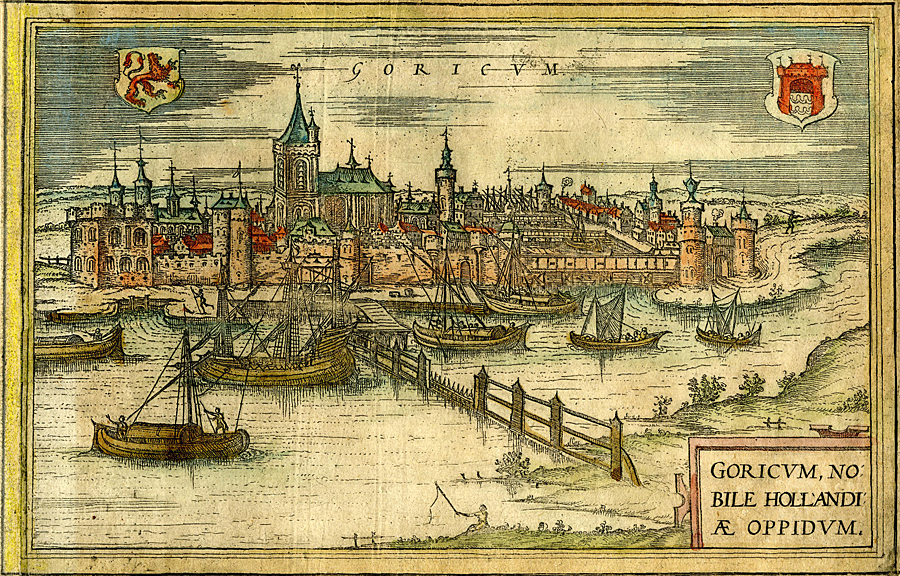
The Blue Tower as a quadrangular tower on a view by Frans Hogenberg (around 1580)

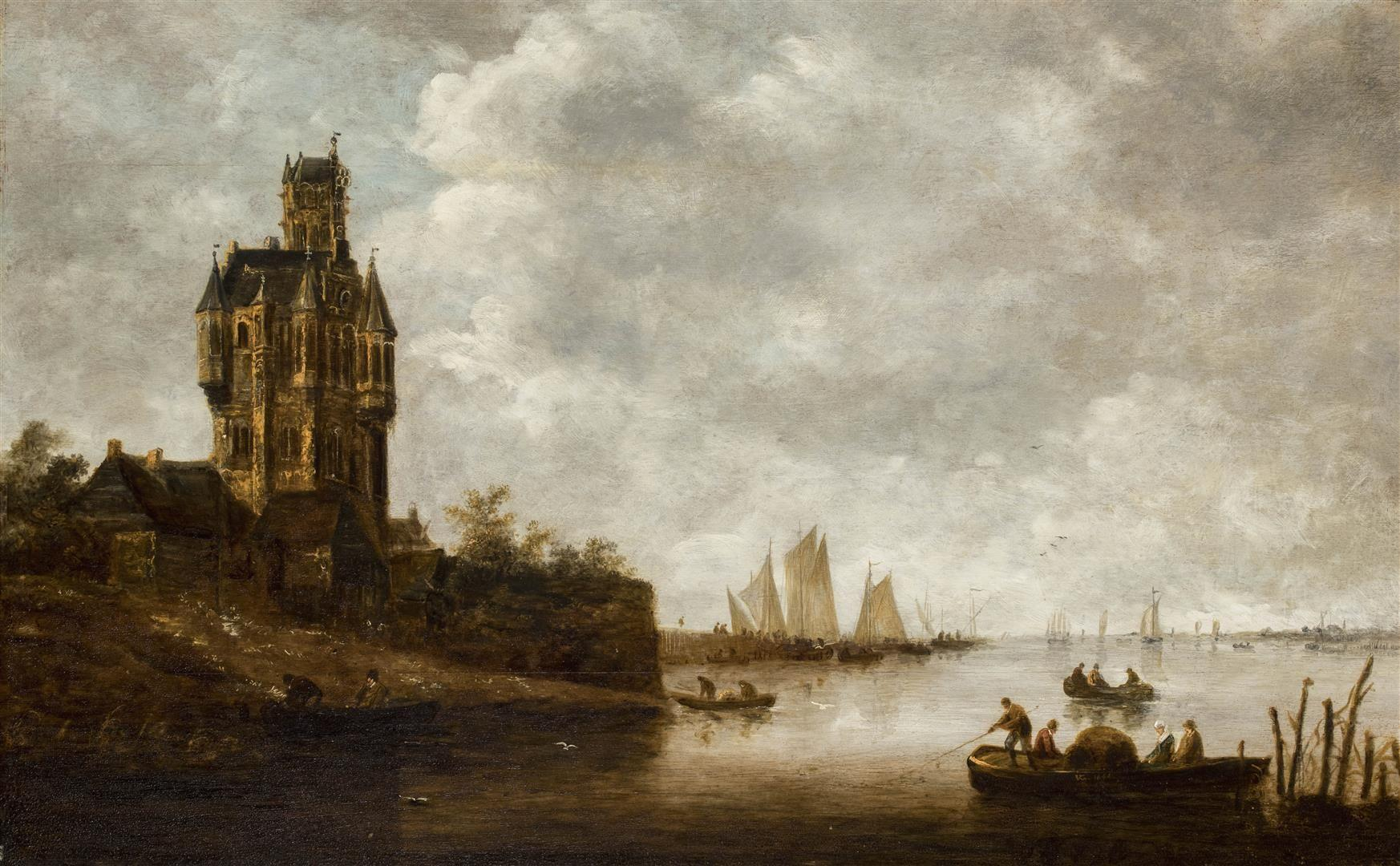
Dutch Riverscape by a follower of Jan van Goyen (1644) with possibly the Blue Tower included

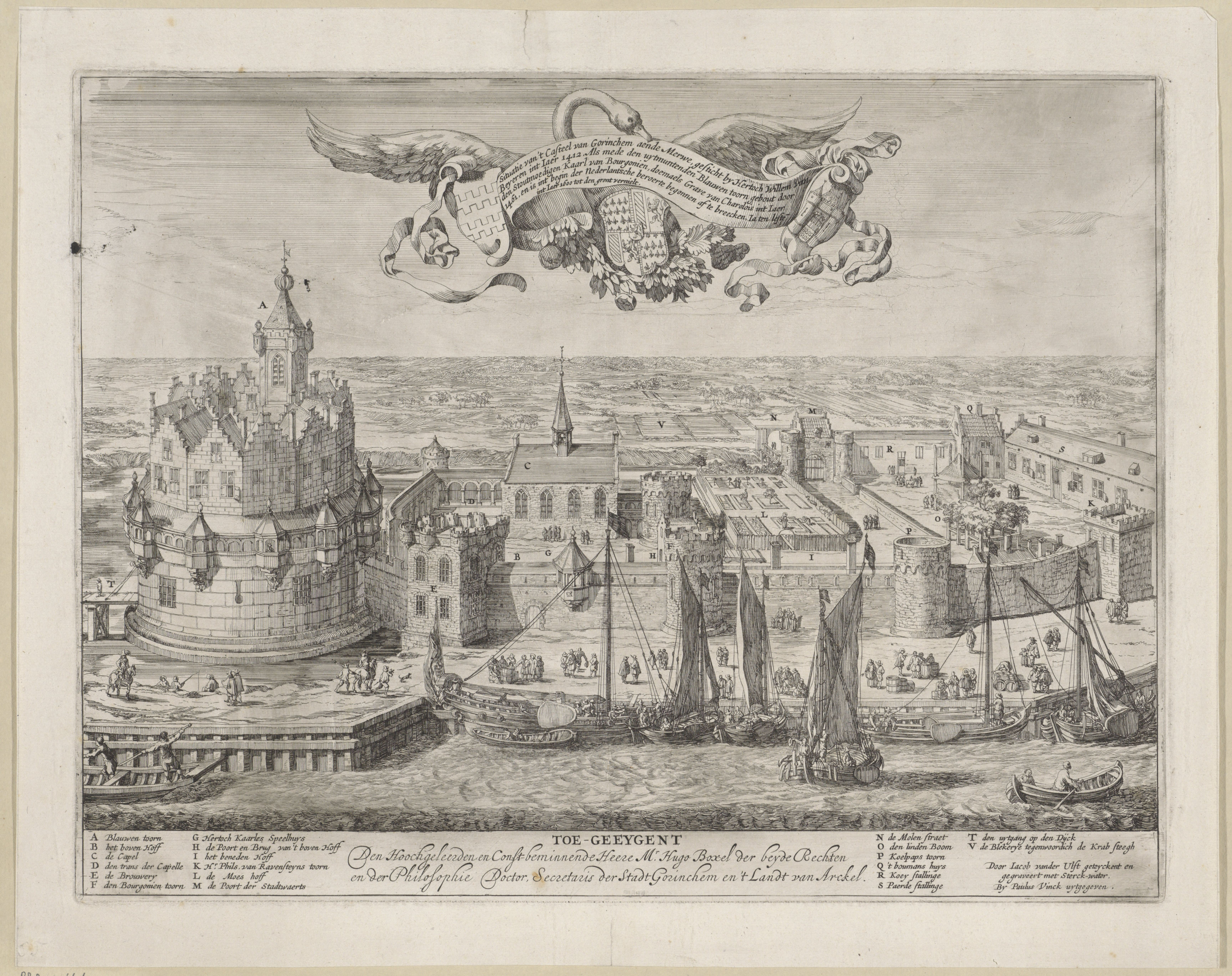
The Blue Tower by Jacob van der Ulft (1656)

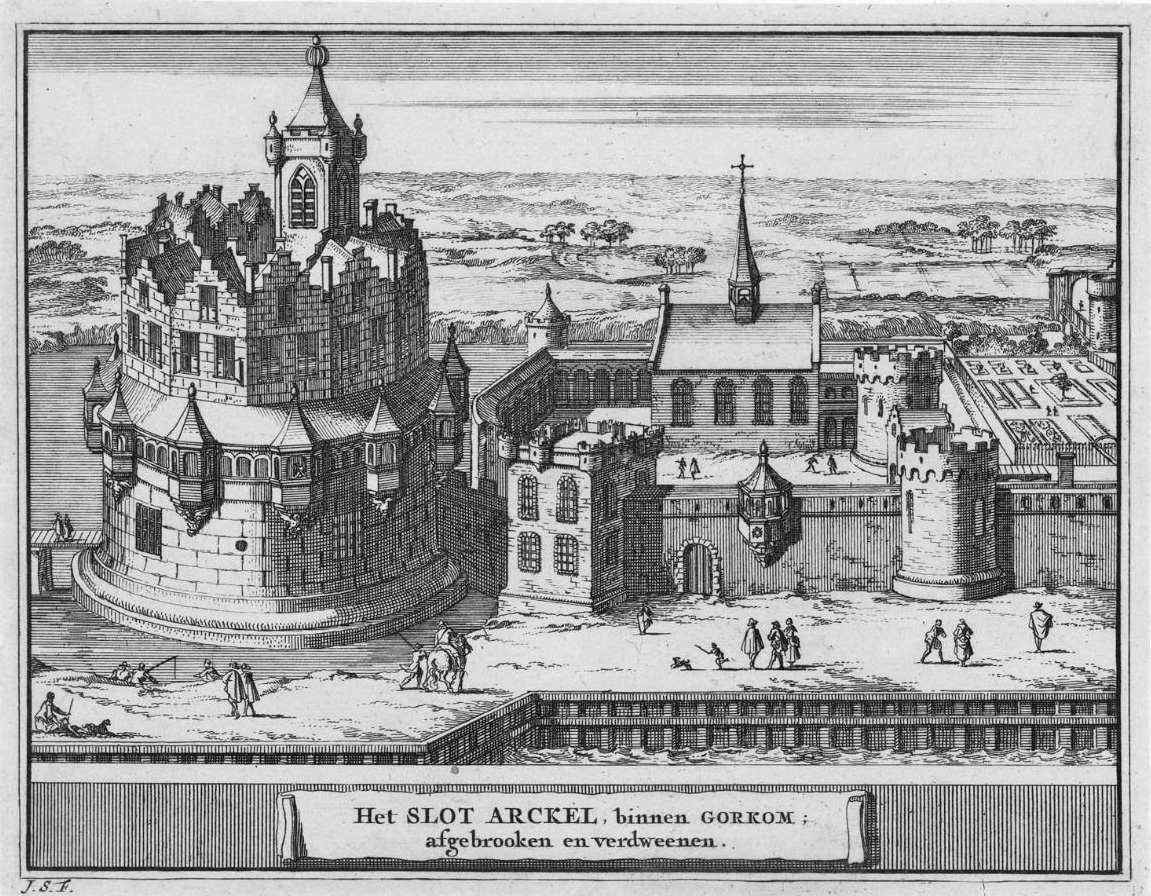
The Blue Tower by Jacobus Schijnvoet (1711)

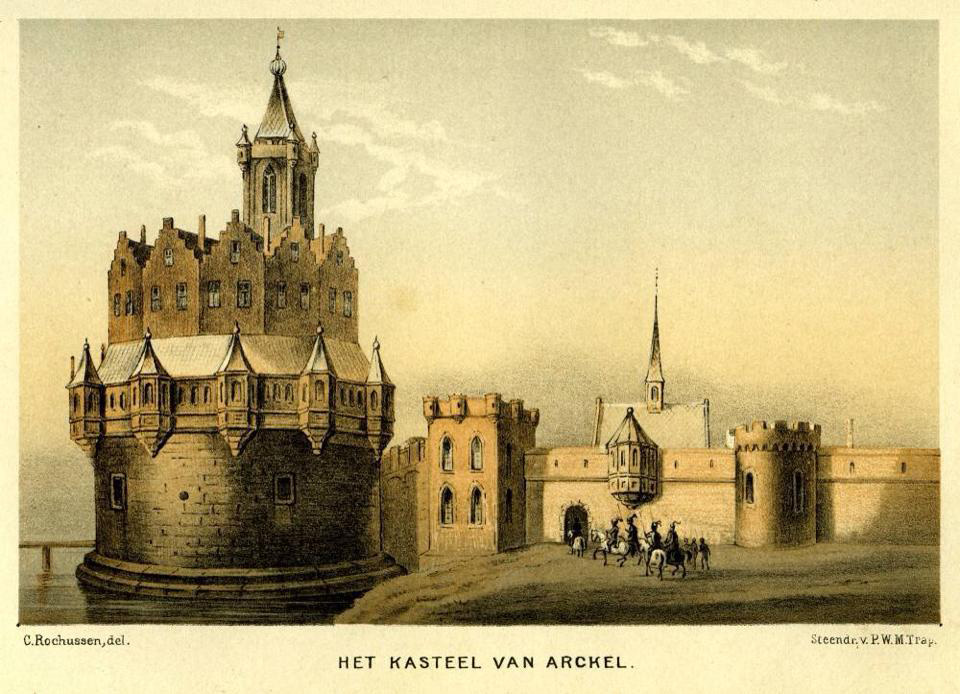
The Blue Tower by Charles Rochussen (1854)

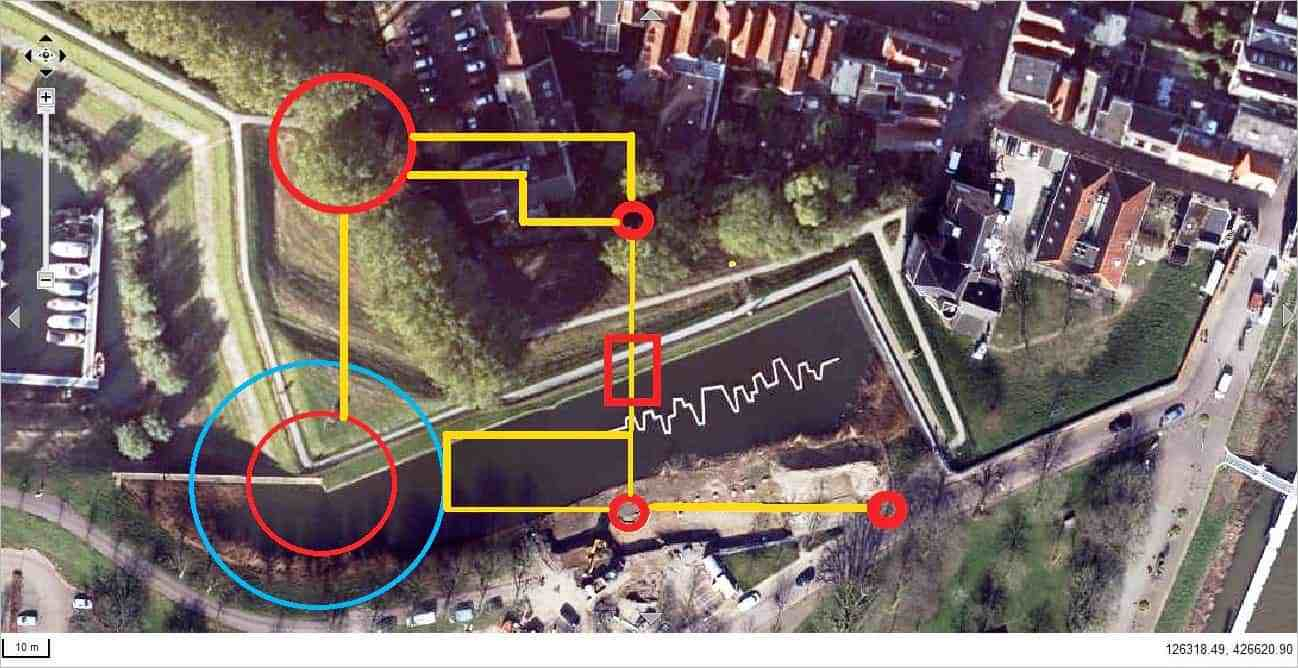
Plan indicating where the location of the Blue Tower is within Gorinchem by Arie Saakes (2018)

=== Willem VI of Holland ===
After the Arkelse Wars (Dutch: Arkelse Oorlogen) (1402–1412), the castle of the Lords of Arkel to the east of the city center of Gorinchem was demolished. Willem VI of Holland decided to build a new castle on the southwestern side of the city. Little is known about this castle. It was built on the Merwede as part of the medieval fortress and had to withstand both sieges from the riverside and potential attacks from the city itself. For its construction, a city gate and a nearby grain mill at the southern end of Molenstraat had to be removed.

In 1440, Philip the Good paid the church of Gorinchem 17 Wilhelmusschilden and 5 Flemish groats because he and his predecessors, Willem V of Holland and Jacoba of Bavaria, had expropriated houses and estates. The area of the complex probably covered a significant part of the land that later served as the outer bailey of the Blue Tower.

=== Charles the Bold ===
In 1461, Charles of Charolais, later known as Charles the Bold, ordered the expansion of the castle and the construction of a bridge over the Merwede. This was all because he was embroiled in a power struggle with his father, Philip the Good. Their dispute was settled again in 1465, and his ambitious plans were adjusted. Only two sturdy towers were completed. The largest was clad on the outside with Petit Granit, a moisture-resistant blue limestone, and thus got the name Blue Tower.

=== Margaret of Austria ===
On the orders of Margaret of Austria (1480–1530), Governor of the Habsburg Netherlands, construction of the distinctive roof with stepped gables began in 1522. The architect was Rombout II Keldermans, the personal architect of emperor Charles V. The construction contract was signed on 1 September 1523, by carpenters Jacob Snouc from Gorinchem and Joos Janssone de Keyser from The Hague. The stone suppliers mentioned were Michiel Yselwijns and Anthonis de Vleeshouwere. The work was completed in 1530.

=== The end ===
In 1578, the tower was demolished as it did not fit into the new fortification plans designed by Adriaan Anthonisz. The freed stones were used in the new fortifications of Gorinchem.

Van der Aa reported that it was not until 1831 that the last remnants of the walls disappeared from sight. These remnants gave rise to a local legend about a wicked castle lady who, during times of famine, had the unpleasant habit of feasting and scrubbing her courtyard with milk until God had enough and, as punishment, caused her and the entire castle to vanish into the Duivelsgracht or Duveltjesgracht (English: Devil’s Moat).

== Architecture ==
The castle originally consisted of two floors: a ground floor that included a knight's hall above vaulted cellars, which housed the prisons. According to 17th-century records, the castle had walls 36 feet thick (approximately 11.3 meters), tapering to 29 feet (approximately 9.1 meters) at the top. From a reconstruction of the structure built atop the tower in 1524, it appears that this measurement refers to the thickness of the ring. The walls themselves were likely much thinner. The total diameter of the castle was about 46 meters at the base, narrowing to about 42 meters at the top.

It seems that the dimensions of the Blue Tower represented some sort of ideal measurement. Even the most famous 14th-century European princely round castles, such as the Bellver Castle (diameter approximately 45 meters) in Palma de Mallorca, dating from the first half of the 14th century, and Queenborough Castle (diameter approximately 44 meters) in Kent, built between 1361 and 1377 by King Edward III of England, had nearly the same dimensions. The Dutch historian Ruud Meischke describes the construction of the towers as a pinnacle of late medieval fortification and foundation techniques. Multiple Burgundian master builders were possibly involved in its construction.

== The Blue Tower depicted ==
The tower appeared on the Gorinchem city map by Jacob van Deventer (1558) and was also depicted (in square form) in the city views book Civitates Orbis Terrarum by cartographers Georg Braun and Frans Hogenberg (1580). Jacob van der Ulft used their square tower as a key element in his own drawing, which he mainly based on the descriptions of Abraham Kemp, while also allowing his imagination to run free. His depiction was copied in several publications in the centuries that followed.

== Archeological founds ==
In 1983, while building new houses at Krabsteeg-Schuttersgracht, foundation remnants over nine meters wide were discovered. The construction of the new houses had to be temporarily halted because the walls could not be removed. Eventually, pile-driving was achieved using diamond drills. Parts of the old foundations remain underground, allowing for potential future research.

Around 1999, the Gorinchem fortress was renovated. To reinforce the dike, a sheet pile wall was driven into Bastion VI. To preserve the existing castle foundations, ground borings and a test trench were dug first, after which the path of the wall was adjusted.

During excavations in November 2016, the foundation of a tower and a city wall were found. The remains of the tower and wall are located Buiten de Waterpoort, where a café once stood. The discovery received much publicity, as the castle of Charles the Bold still captures the imagination of everyone in Gorinchem. Further investigation revealed that it was a fortification tower with wall remnants from the late 14th century, predating the construction of the Blue Tower. However, in 2017, on the initiative of the developer planning new construction at this site, a second supplementary architectural historical investigation was conducted. It concluded that it was indeed a castle wall that also played a role in city defense.

== Literature ==
- A.J. van der Aa, Aardrijkskundig woordenboek der Nederlanden, Gorinchem, 1836–1851, Deel 4.
- G. Braun en F. Hogenberg, Civitates Orbis Terrarum, Liber Primus, Keulen (1572)
- Sjeng M. Dautzenberg, Archeologisch prospectie onderzoek aan Bastion V te Gorinchem, Amsterdam, 1999.
- H.A. van Goch, Van Arkel's Oude Veste, Geschied- en Oudheidkundige aantekeningen betreffende de stad Gorinchem en hare voornaamste gebouwen en instellingen. Gorinchem, 1898.
- D.P. Hallewas, Gorcum | Krabsteeg; vondst muurresten mogelijk in verband Blauwe Toren, Archeologische Kroniek Zuid-Holland 1983 in: Regionaal Historisch Tijdschrift Holland, 16e jaargang no. 6, 1984.
- Taco Hermans en Edwin Orsel, De verbouwing van de Blauwe Toren te Gorinchem in 1522–1530, in: 'Zij waren van groote en zware steenen', Recent onderzoek op het gebied van kastelen en buitenplaatsen in Nederland, Stichting Kastelenstudies Nederland Publicatiereeks-1, Wijk bij Duurstede, 2017.
- H.F.G. Hundertmark, Vestingwerk of kasteel?, Aanvullend bouwhistorisch onderzoek archeologische opgraving Buiten de Waterpoort 2-6 te Gorinchem; Oss; 2017
- H.F.G. Hundertmark, Een nieuw kasteel voor de graaf van Holland. Kasteel de Blauwe Toren te Gorinchem, in: 'Die hofstat daer dat huys op plach te staan', Recent onderzoek op het gebied van kastelen en buitenplaatsen in Nederland, Stichting Kastelenstudies Nederland Publicatiereeks-4, Zwolle, 2022.
- Merlijn Hurx, Architect en aannemer, De opkomst van de bouwmarkt in de Nederlanden 1350–1530, Nijmegen/’s-Gravenhage, 2013.
- Merlijn Hurx, De Blauwe Toren in Gorinchem: een vorstelijk kasteel aan de Merwede, in: 'Zij waren van groote en zware steenen', Recent onderzoek op het gebied van kastelen en buitenplaatsen in Nederland, Stichting Kastelenstudies Nederland Publicatiereeks-1, Wijk bij Duurstede, 2017.
- Merlijn Hurx, 'Een alten wonderlijcken structure ende fortresse', De Blauwe Toren van Karel de Stoute in Gorinchem, in: Bulletin Koninklijke Oudheidkundige Bond (KNOB), jaargang 116, nummer 4, Delft, 2017.
- H.L. Janssen, J.M.M. Kylstra-Wielinga & B. Olde Meierink, 1000 Jaar kastelen in Nederland, Functie en vorm door de eeuwen heen, Utrecht 1996.
- Abraham Kemp, Leven der Doorluchtige Heeren van Arkel ende Jaar-Beschrijving der Stad Gorinchem. Gorinchem, 1656.
- G.C. Labouchère, Aanteekeningen over monumenten te Gorinchem, Schelluinen, Woudrichem, Loevestein en Zalt-Bommel, in: Oudheidkundig Jaarboek van de Nederlandsche Oudheidkundige Bond, Utrecht, 1931.
- J. van Lennep en W.J. Hofdijk, Merkwaardige kasteelen in Nederland, deel 1, Amsterdam, 1854.
- R. Meischke, De gothische bouwtraditie, studies over opdrachtgevers en bouwmeesters in de Nederlanden, Amersfoort, 1988.
- H.F. van Peer, Sterke Gorcumse Verhalen, Goudriaan, 1975.
- W.G. van Reenen, Bouwhistorische ondersteuning bij een archeologische opgraving Buiten de Waterpoort 2-6, Gorinchem, Van Reenen onderzoeksbureau voor bouwhistorie, Leerdam, 2017.
- Ludolph Smids, Schatkamer der Nederlandse oudheden; of woordenboek, behelsende Nederlands steden en dorpen, kasteelen, sloten en heeren huysen, oude volkeren, rievieren, vermaarde luyden in staat en oorlogh, oudheden, gewoontens en lands wysen, Amsterdam (1711)
- Martin Veen, De Blauwe Toren, in: Oud-Gorcum Varia, tijdschrift van de historische vereniging "Oud-Gorcum", nummer 15, Gorinchem, 1998.
- Aron de Vries, Op den Slot tot Gorinchem. De eerste bouwfase van het kasteel (1412–1460), jaarboek 2017-deel 33 Historische vereniging "Oud-Gorcum", Gorinchem, 2017.
- L.R. van Wilgen, Inventariserend Veldonderzoek door middel van proefsleuven en Archeologische Begeleiding Plangebied ‘Buiten de Waterpoort 2-6’, Gorinchem, Gemeente Gorinchem, Evaluatierapport, SOB Research, Heinenoord, 2017.
