= James IV of Majorca =

Titular king of Majorca (1336–1375)

James IV
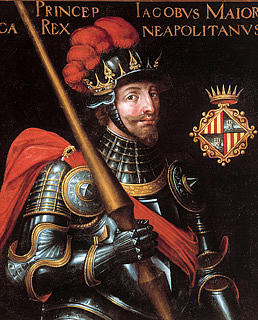

King of Majorca (titular)
- Reign: 25 October 1349 – 20 January 1375

King consort of Naples
- Tenure: 26 September 1363 – 20 January 1375
- Born: 1336
- Died: 20 January 1375 (aged 38–39); Soria
- Spouse: Joanna I of Naples
- House: House of Barcelona
- Father: James III of Majorca
- Mother: Constance of Aragon

James IV of Majorca, also known as Jaume IV (c. 1336 – 20 January 1375), unsuccessfully claimed the thrones of the Kingdom of Majorca and the Principality of Achaea from 1349 until his death. He was also king consort of Naples, without any role in its government.

== Early life ==
Born around 1336, James was the son of King James III of Majorca and Constance of Aragon. The Kingdom of Majorca came into being when James the Conqueror, King of Aragon, died on 27 June 1276. He distributed his realms between his two sons, leaving his elder son, Peter III, with Aragon, Catalonia and Valencia, and his younger son, James II, with the Balearic Islands, Montpellier, Roussillon and Cerdanya.

Peter III of Aragon and his successors made several attempts to re-unite the lands of the Crown of Aragon under their rule. Peter III demanded an oath of fealty from his brother in 1280; Peter III's elder son, Alfonso III of Aragon, occupied the Balearic Islands in 1287. Alfonso III's brother and successor, James II of Aragon, restored the islands to his uncle in the Treaty of Anagni in 1295, but James II of Majorca had to acknowledge his nephew's suzerainty. In 1324, James II of Aragon confirmed the right of James II of Majorca's grandson, James III of Majorca (James IV's father), to inherit the Kingdom of Majorca after lengthy negotiations. James III married the sister of Peter IV of Aragon, but their relationship was tense, because James III avoided doing homage to his brother-in-law for years. Peter IV declared James III a disobedient vassal and occupied the Balearic Islands, Roussillon and Cerdanya in May 1344.

James III went to Avignon in early 1348 to secure Pope Clement VI's support against Peter IV. James accompanied his father. Scholar Nancy Goldstone proposes that James most probably met with his future wife, Joanna I of Naples, who had come to Avignon to stand trial for her alleged involvement in the murder of her first husband, Andrew. She answered the charges that Andrew's brother, Louis I of Hungary, had brought against her and the Pope declared her innocent in March 1348. James III supported Joanna I during the trial and she promised to lend the Neapolitan fleet to him to invade the Balearic Islands. James III had to sell his last domain, Montpellier, to France to raise funds before launching the invasion in 1349. His army was routed and he was killed in the Battle of Llucmajor on 25 October 1349.

== Imprisonment and marriage ==
His father was killed at the Battle of Llucmajor in 1349 while attempting to recapture his kingdom, and James IV was taken prisoner by his uncle, Peter IV of Aragon. Now pretender to the Kingdom of Majorca and the Principality of Achaea, James was kept in an iron cage in Barcelona until 1362. He then contrived to escape and take refuge with Joanna I of Naples, who had aided his father's last attempt on Majorca.

Joanna was then childless, and in need of an heir: she married James on September 26, 1363, at Castel Nuovo. Perhaps to avoid the civil strife of Joanna's first two marriages, James was carefully excluded from government of his wife's realm by the marriage contract. The marriage proved unsuccessful; however, in January 1365 Joanna was found to be pregnant with James IV's child, but in June she had a miscarriage, as noted in a letter of condolence sent to her by Pope Urban V dated 19 July 1365. They never conceived again.

== Struggle for Majorca ==
James was determined to recapture his kingdom, and soon departed to make war on the Kingdom of Aragon. He was defeated and forced to flee to Bordeaux. There he gained the support of Edward the Black Prince, who he hoped would restore him to Majorca after restoring Peter the Cruel in Castile. He joined the invasion of Castile, taking part in the battle of Nájera (3 April 1367). He was stricken with a long and severe illness in Valladolid. Unable to ride, he could not leave the city and was captured by Henry II of Castile. Ransomed by Joanna, he returned to Naples only briefly before setting off again.

Henry had launched a war against Peter IV of Aragon, and James hoped to take advantage of this to capture Roussillon and Cerdanya, the mainland portions of his father's realm. However, John of Gaunt procured a truce between Castile and Aragon, and the full weight of the Aragonese forces fell upon James. Defeated again, he fled into Castile, where he died of illness or poison at Soria on 20 January 1375, the 32nd anniversary of his wife's accession.

His pretensions to Majorca passed to his sister Isabella, wife of John II of Montferrat. He willed his rights to Achaea to Joanna, who had ruled the remains of the Principality since 1373 by cession of her brother-in-law, Philip II of Taranto.

== Sources ==
- Abulafia, David (1994). A Mediterranean emporium: The Catalan kingdom of Majorca. Cambridge University Press. ISBN 0-521-89405-0.
- Abulafia, David (1997). The Western Mediterranean Kingdoms 1200-1500: The Struggle for Dominion. Routledge. ISBN 978-0-582-07820-8.
- Bisson, T. N. (1986). The Medieval Crown of Aragon: A Short History. Clarendon Press. ISBN 0-19-820236-9.
- Casteen, Elizabeth (2015). From She-Wolf to Martyr: The Reign and Disputed Reputation of Johanna I of Naples. Cornell University Press. ISBN 978-0-8014-5386-1.
- Goldstone, Nancy (2009). The Lady Queen: The Notorious Reign of Joanna I, Queen of Naples, Jerusalem, and Sicily. Walker&Company. ISBN 978-0-8027-7770-6.
- O'Callagan, Joseph F. (1975). A History of Medieval Spain. Cornell University Press. ISBN 0-8014-9264-5.

James IV of Majorca House of Barcelona Cadet branch of the House of Barcelona Born: 1336 Died: 20 January 1375
Regnal titles
Preceded by James III	— TITULAR — King of Majorca; 1349–1375	Succeeded by Isabella
Preceded by James III	— TITULAR — Prince of Achaea; 1349–1375	Succeeded by Joanna
Royal titles
Vacant Title last held by Andrew, Duke of Calabria	King consort of Naples; 1363–1375	Vacant Title next held by Otto of Brunswick-Grubenhagen
