= Constance of Aragon, Queen of Majorca =

Constance

Queen consort of Majorca
- Tenure: 1336–1344; 1344–1346 (in pretendence)
- Born: 1318
- Died: 1346 (aged 27–28); Montpellier
- Spouse: James III of Majorca
- Issue: James IV of Majorca; Isabella of Majorca
- House: House of Barcelona
- Father: Alfonso IV of Aragon
- Mother: Teresa d'Entença

Constance of Aragon (1318–Montpellier, 1346) was Queen of Majorca as the wife of King James III. She was the eldest daughter of Alfonso IV of Aragon and his first wife, Teresa d'Entença.

James III wished to have friendly relations with Aragon, and thus married Constance in Perpignan on 24 September 1336. In 1342, he refused to take the oath of fealty to Constance's brother, Peter IV of Aragon.

James and Constance had two children:

1. James (c. 1336 – January 20, 1375), pretender to the throne of Majorca
2. Isabella (1337–1406), pretender to the throne of Majorca

In a short war (1343–44), James (and allegedly Constance) was driven out of Majorca by Peter, who annexed the Balearic Islands to the Crown of Aragon.

Two years later, Constance died in Montpellier. She was outlived by James and her two children. Her husband remarried the following year to Violante of Vilaragut.

== Works ==
Constance of Aragon is thought the be the author of Ez yeu am tal que's bo e belh, a poem present in the Cançoner Vega-Aguiló (Spain, Barcelona, Biblioteca de Catalunya, ms. 7-8, f. 49r-v). The attribution of the text in this manuscript is "La Reyna de Mallorques", which leads historians to believe it could alternatively have been authored by James III's second wife, Violante of Vilaragut.

The first stanza can also be found in a manuscript (Spain, Barcelona, Biblioteca de Catalunya, ms. 1716, f. 43v-r) containing a catalan translation of Decameron. Said stanza can be found at the bottom of the 43rd folio, after the red mark.

== Sources ==
- Previté-Orton, Charles William (1952). The Shorter Cambridge Medieval History. Vol. II The Twelfth Century to the Renaissance. Cambridge at the University Press.

Constance of Aragon, Queen of Majorca House of Barcelona Born: circa 1318 Died: circa 1346
Royal titles
Vacant Title last held by Maria of Anjou	Queen consort of Majorca; 1336–1344	Succeeded by Maria of Navarre
