= Bencion =

Spanish noble and count

Bencion (in Catalan and Spanish, Benció) (died 916) was the count of Empúries and Rosselló from 915 to his death. He was the son of Sunyer II of Empúries, whom he succeeded.

He married Godlana, daughter of Miro the Elder of Conflent and Roussillon.

At the death of his father, he and his brother Gausbert inherited the counties and reigned jointly. He was the first to die and his brother inherited all of his possessions.

Preceded by Sunifred II	Count of Rosselló; 915–916	Succeeded by Gausbert
Preceded by Sunifred II	Count of Empúries; 915–916	Succeeded by Gausbert
