= Violante of Vilaragut =

Queen consort of Majorca
- Tenure: 1347–1349 (in pretendence)
- Born: 1320/25
- Died: before 1372
- Spouse: James III of Majorca; Otto, Duke of Brunswick-Grubenhagen
- House: House of Barcelona
- Father: Berengeur de Vilaragut
- Mother: Saura of Majorca

Violante of Vilaragut (1320 or 1325 – before 1372) was a daughter of Berengeur de Vilaragut and his second wife Saura, who was an illegitimate daughter of James II of Majorca. Violante was titular queen of Majorca by her marriage to her cousin James III of Majorca.

== Life ==
The marriage contract was signed on 10 November 1347 for the marriage of Violante and James. This was James' second marriage after the death of his first wife Constance of Aragon. Violante gained two stepchildren James and Isabella. Violante's brother was appointed counsellor and grand chamberlain to her husband. Violante bore her husband a daughter named Esclaramunda, who died young.

James lost the kingdom in 1343 (before the marriage) and he was killed at the Battle of Llucmajor on 25 October 1349 by Peter IV of Aragon. The couple had only been married for three years.

Violante and her stepchildren were captured by King Peter after the battle in which her husband was killed, and confined to the convent of the Clarissans at Valencia with Isabella. Violante was freed around 1358/59, and soon had Isabella released, on the condition that Isabella renounced her rights to Majorca.

Violante later left Spain and travelled to France where she was made Vicomtesse d'Omélas by John II of France in 1352. Around the same time, she married Otto, Duke of Brunswick-Grubenhagen and helped arrange the marriage of her stepdaughter Isabella to John II, Marquess of Montferrat.

Violante died sometime before 1372, without surviving children. Her husband then married Joanna I of Naples, widow of her stepson James.

Titles in pretence
| Vacant Title last held by Constance of Aragon | — TITULAR — Queen consort of Majorca; 1347–1349 | Vacant Title next held by Joanna I of Naples |
