= Dela, Count of Empúries =

Spanish noble and count

Dela (Catalan: Delà) (d. c. 894), count of Empúries (862–894), was the son of Sunyer I of Empúries, whom he succeeded along with his brother, Sunyer II of Empúries, in 862.

The brothers tried to conquer the county of Girona, but their relative, Wilfred the Hairy, halted their advances.

He married Sixilona, daughter of Sunifred I, Count of Barcelona, and they had the following children:

- Ranló (d. 960), abbess of the Monastery of Sant Joan de les Abadesses
- Virgilia (d. 957)

| Preceded by Humfrid | Count of Empúries; 862-894 | Succeeded by Sunifred II |
