= Leges palatinae =

Laws of the Kingdom of Majorca

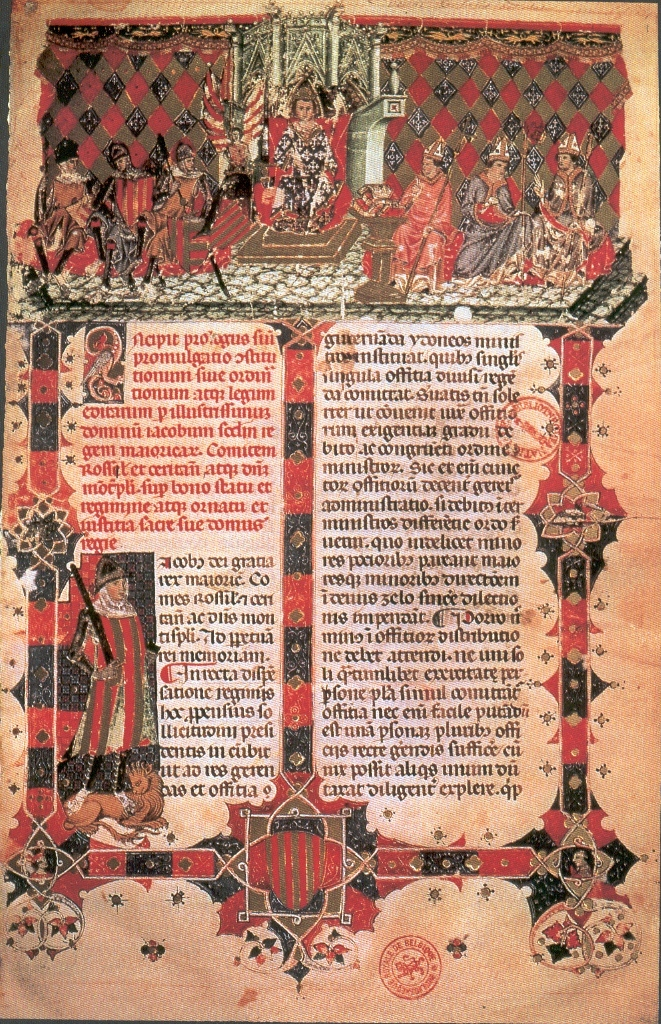
First page of the Leges. James is at centre, top. The prologue begins Incipit...

The Leges palatinae ("Palatine Laws") were the laws governing the functioning of the royal court of the Kingdom of Majorca, promulgated by James III at Palma on 9 May 1337. The Leges were probably conceived to lend weight to James's position as an independent king. The Leges are preserved in an illuminated manuscript with colourful images by an Italian artist of the court officers about their duties. The Leges were translated from Latin and revised as the Catalan Ordenacions de cort by Peter IV of Aragon, after he conquered Majorca, in 1344.

The original manuscript was brought with James III to France when he fled Peter's invasion. He there gave it to King Philip VI. It was later given to Philip the Bold and ended up in the Bibliothèque Royale in Brussels. A facsimile edition by Joan Domenge i Mesquida, with an introduction in English describing the artistic value of the manuscript, was published by Indiana University Press in 1994.

The Leges are divided into seven sections and are "the most elaborate set of ordinances to survive from this period". Much of the text is spent explaining the roles of the four great officers of state: the majordomo (or maître d'hôtel), great chamberlain (or camerlingue), the chancellor, and the maestre racional (also maître des comptes or maître rational). The lesser officers included the butler, marshal, and constable. The majordomo was in charge of maintaining court protocols and oversaw the king's table, much like the later grand maître d'hôtel in Valois Duchy of Burgundy. The chancellor, the vice-chancellor, and the scribes of the chancery were accorded the right to issue documents pertinent to their offices without the prior permission of the king. The subsection De mimis et joculatoribus ("On actors and entertainers") prescribes two trumpeters, a drummer, and two other performers permanently at court. They played when the king arrived at dinner, when he left the table, and at the end of the meal; an early version of Tafelmusik.
