= Otto of Brunswick-Grubenhagen =

King consort of Naples from 1376 to 1381

Otto of Brunswick-Grubenhagen (1320 – 1 December 1398) was the fourth and last husband of Queen Joanna I of Naples. He held the title of prince of Taranto.

Otto was the eldest son of Duke Henry II of Brunswick-Grubenhagen (c. 1289 – 1351) and Jutta of Brandenburg.

In 1353, he married Violante of Vilaragut, widow of King James III of Majorca. There were no children from this marriage. By 1372, Otto was a widower. On 25 September 1376, Otto married his second wife, the three times widowed Queen Joanna I of Naples. The groom was fifty-six years old and the bride about forty-eight. The marriage was childless.

The so-called Western Schism started in 1378 with the election of two rival popes, Urban VI of Rome and Clement VII of Avignon. Joanna supported Clement VII and allied herself with his main supporter Charles V of France. With no hope of having further children of her own, Joanna chose to strengthen her alliance with France by adopting Duke Louis I of Anjou, younger brother of Charles V, as her heir.

Urban VI proclaimed Joanna deposed in 1381. He named her second cousin Charles of Durazzo as his candidate for the supposedly vacant throne. Charles spent the following months gathering his army within the Kingdom of Hungary and then marched against the Kingdom of Naples. Otto led the Neapolitan army in battle but was defeated. Otto was exiled from Naples by the new king and never returned. On 27 July 1382, Joanna was strangled in prison in the Castle of Muro Lucano held by Palamede Bozzuto.

Otto survived Joanna by at least sixteen years but never remarried. He died childless at Foggia.

Otto of Brunswick-Grubenhagen House of Welf Cadet branch of the House of Este Born: 1320 Died: 1 December 1398
Regnal titles
Preceded by James of Baux	Prince of Taranto; 1383–1393	Succeeded by Raimondo del Balzo Orsini
