= Gausbert =

Spanish noble and count

Gausbert (died 931) was the count of Empúries and Rosselló from 915 until he died. He was the son of Sunyer II of Empúries and brother of Bencion.

With the murder of his father, the counties passed to him and Bencion, but Bencion died in 916 and all the inheritance fell to Gausbert. In 924, he participated in a campaign with the margrave of Gothia against invading Moors. In 927, he rebuilt Saint Martin of Ampurias.

He married Trudegarda, with whom he had the following children:

- Sunifred, died young
- Gausfred I (died 991), his successor
- Ermengarda (died 994), married Oliba Cabreta

Preceded by Sunifred II	Count of Empúries; 915–931	Succeeded by Gausfred I
Preceded by Sunifred II	Count of Rosselló; 915–931	Succeeded by Gausfred I
