= Queenborough Castle =

Concentric castle in Queenborough, England

- Queenborough, England
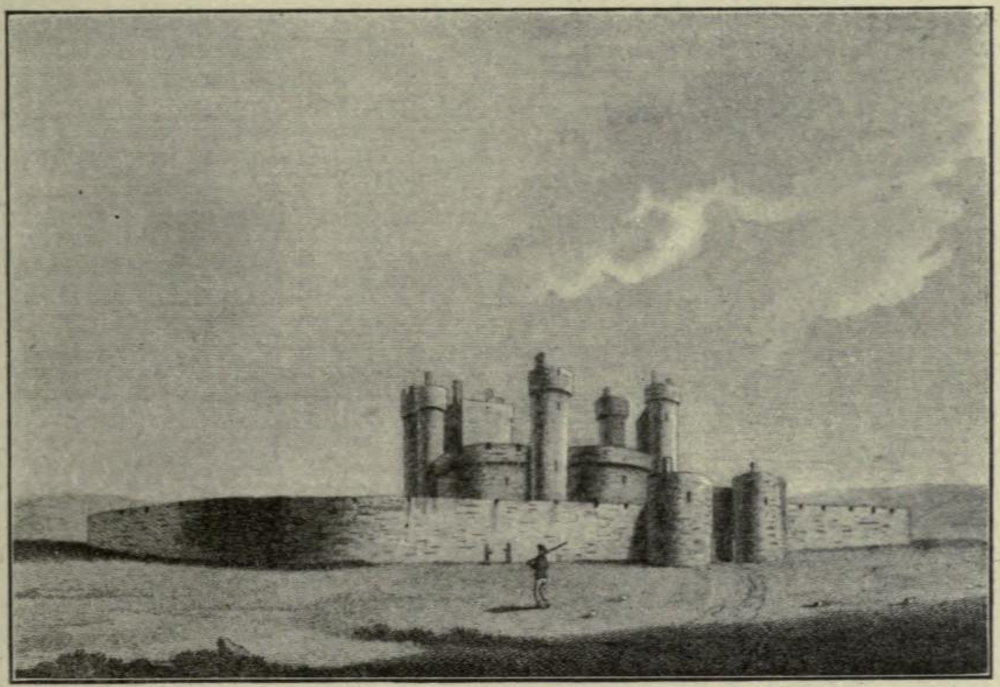
- An 18th-century engraving of Queenborough Castle, based on a lost drawing by Wenceslaus Hollar (1607-1677).

Site information
- Type: Concentric castle
- Open to the public: Yes

Location
- Coordinates: 51°24′58.32″N 0°44′55.17″E

Site history
- Built: 1361-1367
- Demolished: 1650
- Events: Hundred Years' War; Jack Cade's Rebellion

Queenborough Castle, also known as Sheppey Castle, is a 14th-century castle, the remnants of which are in the town of Queenborough on the Isle of Sheppey, Kent in England. The castle and the associated planned town were built on the orders of King Edward III from 1361 and named in honour his wife, Queen Philippa. It was the first concentric castle to be built in England, and the only royal castle to be new-built in England during the Late Middle Ages. Overlooking the Swale, then an important waterway approaching the River Medway, Queenborough Castle formed part of the country's coastal defences until 1650 when it was declared to be unfit for use and was almost completely demolished shortly afterwards. The site is now a public park and the only visible remains are some low earthworks.

== History ==
=== Background ===
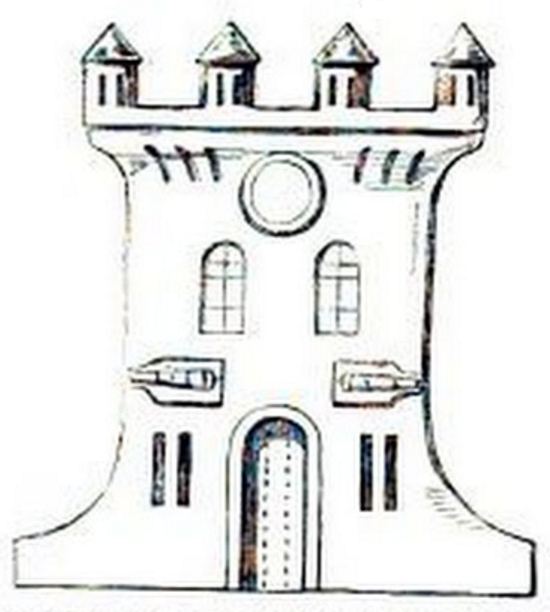
The depiction of Queenborough Castle carved on the contemporary Baptismal font at Holy Trinity Church, Queenborough (an engraving published in London in 1845).

The history of the castle begins in 1361, when King Edward III bought land on the Isle of Sheppey from the manor of Rushenden at the little fishing hamlet of Bynne (or Bynnee); two houses which stood on the site had to be demolished and their occupants rehoused. The stated role of the castle was "for the defence of the realm and for the refuge of the inhabitants of the island". The 1360s were an uneasy peaceful interlude in the Hundred Years' War, brought about by the Treaty of Brétigny in May 1360. It has been suggested that the new castle was more of a palace-fortress, intended as a refuge for the royal family from the Black Death which had arrived in England in the middle of the previous decade. However Queenborough's location commanding the confluence of the Swale and the River Medway, then an important route into the Thames Estuary, together with the contemporary refurbishment of Hadleigh Castle on the opposite side of the Thames demonstrate that there was a strategic consideration. Moreover, there had been destructive French raids on the south coast ports of Rye and Winchelsea in March 1360.

=== Construction ===
Oversight of the construction has been credited by various sources to either master masons John Box or Henry Yevele, or to William of Wykeham. The work required some 1,600 craftsmen and labourers, and was completed by about 1367 at a cost of some £20,000. The castle was built to a radical concentric design, the first of its type to be built in England. It consisted of a large circular building, described as a rotunda or shell keep, buttressed by six projecting towers and having a central circular courtyard. This main building was surrounded by an outer circular curtain wall and a moat. It is possible that the design was influenced by that of Bellver Castle, which had been built in Mallorca between 1300 and 1311 for King James II of Majorca. Queenborough was one of the first English castles built to withstand siege artillery and to mount guns itself, and the last royal castle to be built in England during the Late Middle Ages. Originally, water was channelled from the roofs through lead piping into storage cisterns, but in 1393 a contractor spent sixty weeks digging a deep well in the centre of the courtyard.

=== 14th to 16th centuries ===
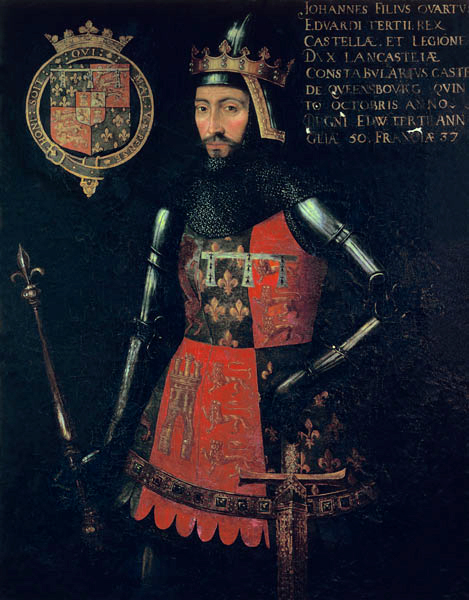
Portrait of John of Gaunt, Duke of Lancaster, Constable of Queenborough Castle from 1377; portrait commissioned in about 1593 by Sir Edward Hoby for Queenborough Castle, probably modelled on Gaunt's now lost tomb effigy in Old St Paul's Cathedral in London. The Latin inscription states him to have been ... Constabularius Caste(llae) de Queensbourg quinto Octobris Anno Regni Edwardi Tertii Anglia(e) 50^{o} Franciae 37^{o} (Constable of the Castle of Queenborough on the fifth of October in the year of the reign of Edward the Third, of England the 50th (i.e. 1376), of France the 37th")

The first constable of the castle was appointed in 1365 before its completion, with instructions to arm it and make it defensible. In the same year, "two great guns and nine small ones" were sent from the cannon foundry at the Tower of London to Queenborough, taking priority before even Dover Castle. Upon the completion of the castle, it was visited by Edward III who created a royal charter for the town which was being laid out close by, naming it Queenborough in honour of his queen consort, Philippa of Hainault. The office of Constable of Queenborough Castle was evidently a prestigious one and those appointed held high rank, notable constables included John of Gaunt, Duke of Lancaster (from 1377) (King Edward's third surviving son), Robert de Vere, Duke of Ireland (from 1385), Thomas Arundel, Archbishop of Canterbury (from 1409) and George Plantagenet, 1st Duke of Clarence (from 1461). Queenborough was one of the residences which Edward III visited frequently during the latter part of his reign. On 21 April 1450, Queenborough Castle was attacked by a French force in a coastal raid, and in July of the same year, easily repelled an attack by Jack Cade and his rebels, during which Cade himself was wounded. King Henry VIII repaired the castle in 1536, and an account written in 1629 describes seeing the coat of arms of Queen Elizabeth I on the wall of the castle's great hall accompanied by a laudatory verse in Latin, exhorting her to "live a virgin and a lion reign".

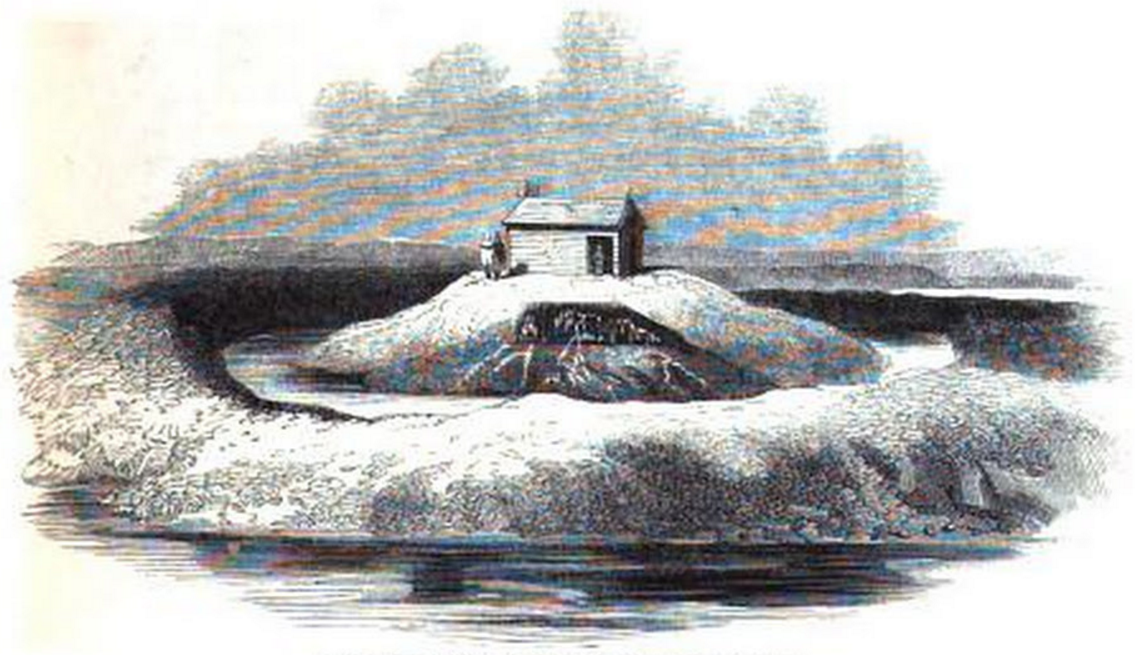
The site of Queenborough Castle in the early 19th century prior to the construction of the railway pump house and later landscaping (an engraving published in London in 1845).

=== 17th to 19th centuries ===
During the English Civil War, Queenborough Castle was held by the Royalists, but after the execution of King Charles I in 1648, the castle came into the possession of the Commonwealth and trustees were appointed to look after it. In 1650, Parliament appointed commissioners to survey the properties which they had acquired from the crown. The report on the condition of Queenborough Castle described it as "much out of repair, and no ways defensive by the commonwealth" and judged that it was "not fit to be kept, but demolished". The castle was sold to one John Wilkinson for £1,792, twelve shillings and one halfpenny; he demolished the entire castle down to the foundations and sold the materials.

In 1723, the Royal Navy surveyed the well which had survived the demolition and found it to be 200 feet (61 metres) deep and lined with Portland stone. After further deepening, they were able to extract “good, soft, sweet and fine” water for the dockyard at Sheerness. In 1860, the Sheerness branch line railway opened, having cut through the eastern part of the site and a pump house was built over the well, as the water was needed for the locomotives. A school was built over the western side of the site.

== Description ==
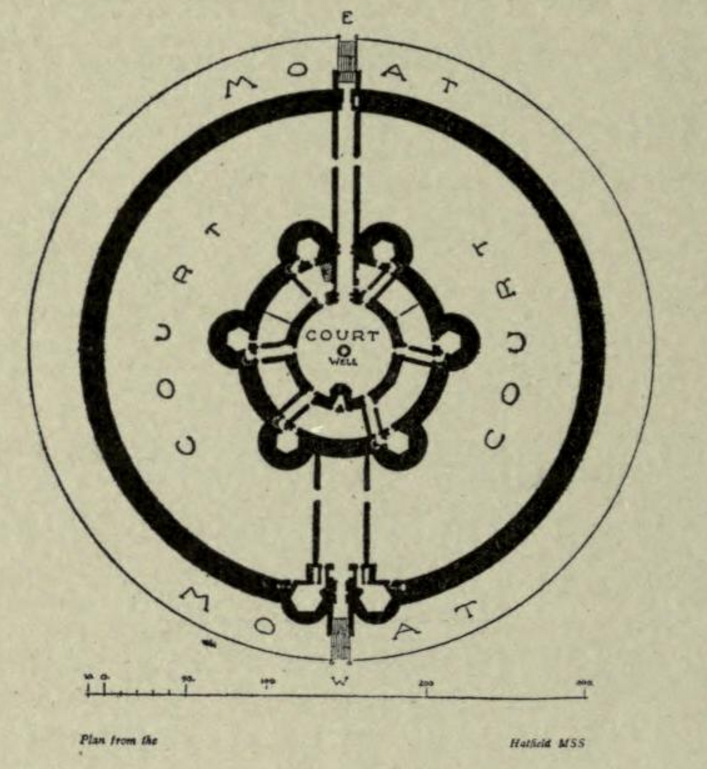
"Plan of Queenborough Castle, Kent... from the Hatfield MSS", published in 1915.

Our knowledge of the appearance of Queenborough Castle comes from a plan in an Elizabethan manuscript preserved at Hatfield House, also from a view by Wenceslaus Hollar (1607-1677) which is now lost but is known from some 18th-century copies and impressions. There are also written descriptions, the most detailed being the 1650 report of the Parliamentary Commissioners.

The circular rotunda enclosed a central paved courtyard with a "great well" in the middle. The exterior wall of the rotunda had six circular towers regularly spaced, apart from the two which protected the main, eastern entrance. The Commissioners reported that the rotunda contained twelve rooms "downstairs" and "about forty rooms from the first story upwards". About 30 yards (27 metres) out from the rotunda was a plain circular curtain wall enclosing a bailey our outer court. The curtain had only two towers which formed a gatehouse for the main entrance at the western side, meaning that any attackers who forced this gate would have had to make their way around to the other side of the bailey to find the rotunda entrance. The curtain wall was surrounded by a large circular moat. Opposite the rotunda entrance was a postern, a small secondary gate for pedestrians. The postern and the main gate were linked to the rotunda by walled passages which divided the bailey. It is known from the castle records that two stone buildings were built in the bailey from 1369 to 1377, although their form and function are unknown. Records also suggest that the castle had a fish pond and a garden. The whole building was estimated by the Commissioners to "upwards of three acres of land".

== Archaeology ==
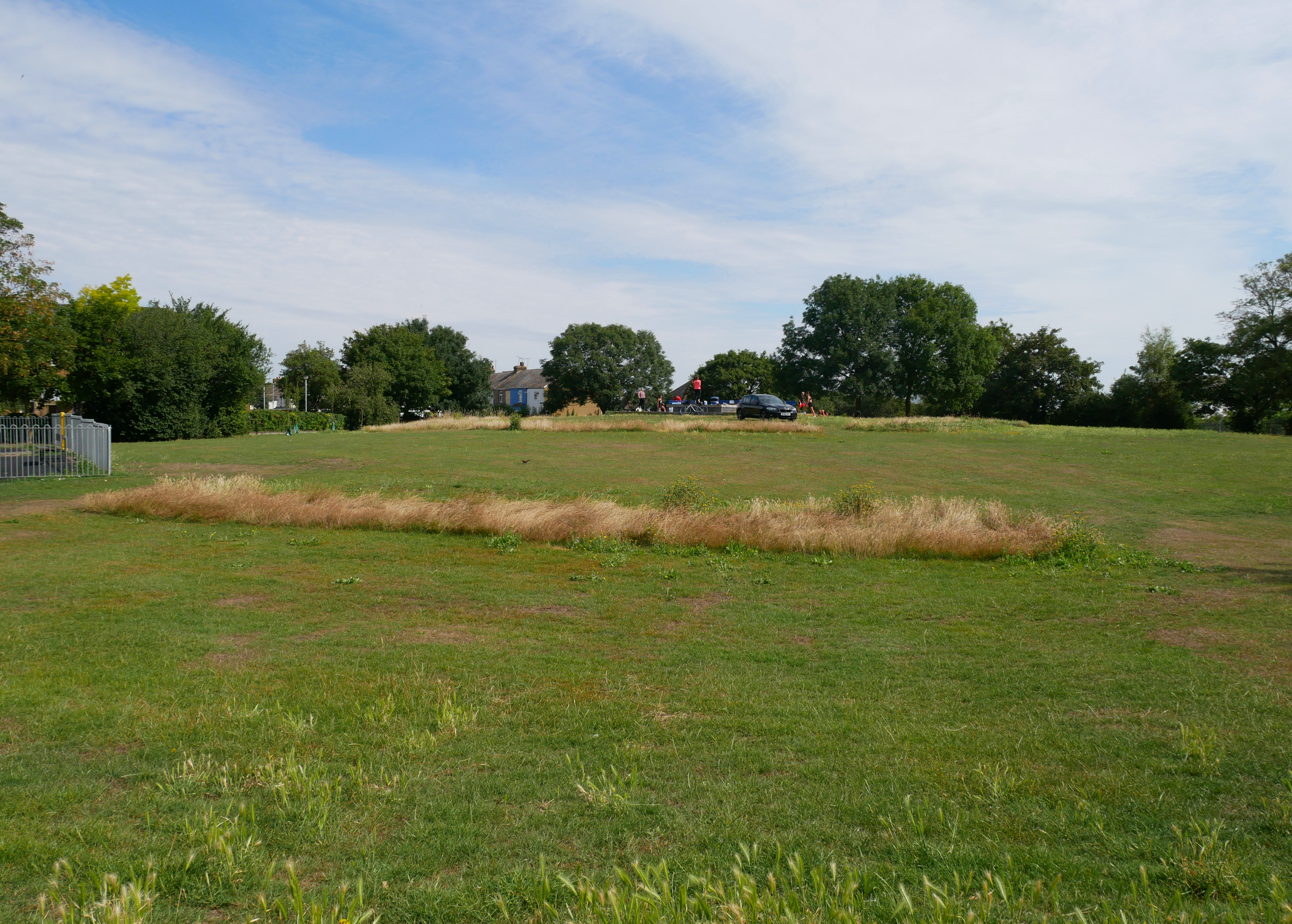
The castle site is a public park and car park: Castle Green

The first archaeological investigation of the site was in September 1991, commissioned by Swale Borough Council prior to the enlargement of the car park towards one side. It was carried out by the Canterbury Archaeological Trust; four slot trenches were dug, much hindered by groundwater and rainwater runoff. The dig is thought to have located the castle's moat.

The Channel 4 documentary series Time Team Series 13, Episode 150: "Castle in the Round" broadcast 12 March 2006 covered a later investigation, undertaken in September 2005. The work was recorded and interpreted by Wessex Archaeology. A geophysical survey was hampered by the presence of a 1970s concrete slab which caps the well, by the clay soil which had been deposited during landscaping, by the presence of pipes and by an air raid shelter. Excavation trenches were able to locate remnants of the outer curtain wall in a robber trench and demolition rubble which had been pushed into the moat, also fragments of walls inside the bailey thought to be from the walled passageways leading from the gate. One trench yielded fragments of moulded stone and Flemish brick, likely from the main castle building. Finds included sixteen small sherds of medieval pottery, five coins and tokens, one a French jeton datable to the 15th century, and two musket balls.

== Sources ==
=== Books ===
- Emery, Anthony (2006). Greater Medieval Houses of England and Wales, 1300–1500: Volume 3, Southern England. Cambridge University Press. ISBN 978-0521581325.
- Emery, Anthony (2015). Seats of Power in Europe during the Hundred Years War. Oxbow Books. ISBN 978-1785701030.
- Ingleton, Roy (2012). Fortress Kent. Pen & Sword Military. ISBN 978-1848848887.
- Keen, M. H. (2003). England in the Later Middle Ages. Routledge. ISBN 978-0415272933.
- Lepage, Jean-Denis G. G. (2012). British Fortifications Through he Reign of Richard III: An Illustrated History. McFarland. ISBN 978-0786459186.
- Liddiard, Robert, ed. (2016). Late Medieval Castles. Boydell & Brewer. ISBN 978-1783270330.
- Pounds, Norman J. G. (2008). The Medieval Castle in England and Wales: A Political and Social History. Cambridge University Press. ISBN 978-0521458283.
- Sweetinburgh, Sheila, ed. (2016). Later Medieval Kent, 1220-1540. Boydell & Brewer. ISBN 978-0851155845.

== See also: Other circular castles ==
- Bellver Castle
- Blue Tower (Gorinchem)
