= Girard II of Roussillon =

12th-century Spanish noble

Gerard II (Girard in French and Gerard in Catalan, Gerardo in Spanish) was the last de facto independent count of Roussillon from 1164 to his death in 1172. He was the son and heir of Gausfred III.

As his father before him, he affirmed treaties of peace with the counts of Ampurias. He inherited a weakened county and was made to do homage to the king of Aragón and count of Barcelona, Alfonso II, to whom he ceded the county when he died without heirs.

Preceded by Gausfred III	Count of Roussillon; 1164–1172	Succeeded by Alfonso II of Aragon
