= James III of Majorca =

King of Majorca from 1315 to 1349

James III
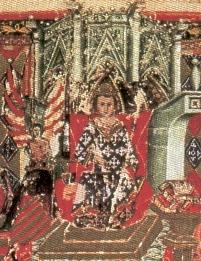
- James III depicted in the Leges palatinae

King of Majorca Count of Roussillon and Cerdanya
- Reign: 4 September 1324–c. 1344

Lord of Montpellier
- Reign: 4 September 1324–25 October 1349

Prince of Achaea
- Reign: c. 1331–25 October 1349
- Born: 5 April 1315; Catania, Kingdom of Sicily
- Died: 25 October 1349 (aged 34); Llucmajor, Kingdom of Majorca
- Burial: Valencia Cathedral, Spain
- Spouses: Constance of Aragon; Violante of Vilaragut
- Issue: James IV of Majorca; Isabella of Majorca
- House: Barcelona
- Father: Ferdinand of Majorca
- Mother: Isabella of Sabran

Arms of James III of Majorca

James III (5 April 1315 – 25 October 1349), known as James the Rash (or the Unfortunate), was King of Majorca from 1324 to 1344. He was the son of Ferdinand of Majorca and Isabella of Sabran.

== Life ==
James was born in Catania, Sicily. Margaret of Villehardouin, James's maternal grandmother, fought to reclaim the Principality of Achaea from the Angevins of the Kingdom of Naples. However, Isabella died shortly after giving birth, and James was subsequently declared the Prince of Achaea, with his father assuming guardianship over him. In an attempt to gain control of the principality, Ferdinand launched an invasion of the Morea but met his demise in the Battle of Manolada in 1316. Despite this setback, starting from 1331, the feudal lords of Achaea gradually acknowledged James's rights. By 1333, this recognition became complete, even though the Angevin heirs of Philip I of Taranto persisted in pressing their claim.

Upon the death of his uncle Sancho in 1324, James inherited the Kingdom of Majorca. His uncle Philip acted as regent for the kingdom until 1329. In a bid to cultivate amicable relations with the Crown of Aragon, James tied the knot with Constance, the daughter of Alfonso IV of Aragon. Even though the kings of Majorca traditionally swore an oath of fealty to the kings of Aragon, James contended that no king could exercise authority over another king. He supported the University of Montpellier, which was situated within his continental domains, and the legal scholars from that institution championed his royal prerogatives.

On 9 May 1337, James introduced the Leges palatinae, an intricate legal code governing his court and the first of its kind. To accompany this, he commissioned a finely crafted illuminated manuscript in an Italian style, which he managed to preserve even after losing his throne. He transported it to the Roman curia and eventually sold it to Philip VI of France.

In 1342, James declined to pledge the oath of fealty to his cousin Peter IV of Aragon. Nevertheless, he received support from the scholars of the University of Montpellier and from Aragonese troubadour, Thomàs Périz de Fozes, who penned a poem in defense of James. This disagreement led to a brief conflict during which Peter managed to expel James from Majorca, subsequently reannexing the Balearic Islands to the Crown of Aragon. James died on 25 October 1349 at the Battle of Llucmajor while attempting to recapture the island.

== Issue ==
James and his first wife, Constance of Aragon, had two children:

- James IV of Majorca (c. 1336–20 January 1375). Married Joanna I of Naples.
- Isabella of Majorca (c. 1337–c. 1406). Married John II of Montferrat.

James and his second wife, Violante of Vilaragut, had one child:

- Esclaramunda of Majorca (unknown). Died shortly after her birth.

== Bibliography ==
- David Abulafia (1994), A Mediterranean Emporium: The Catalan Kingdom of Majorca (Cambridge: Cambridge University Press, ISBN 0-521-89405-0.
- Thomas N. Bisson (2000), The Medieval Crown of Aragon: A Short History (Oxford: Clarendon Press).
- G. Kerscher, The first European ceremonial manuscript—Leges Palatinae—and its relevance for the Mediterranean area, University of Trier.
- Marta Vanlandingham (2002), Transforming the State: King, Court and Political Culture in the Realms of Aragon (1213–1387), (BRILL, ISBN 90-04-12743-7).

James III of Majorca House of Barcelona Born: 5 April 1315 Died: 25 October 1349
Regnal titles
Preceded by Sancho	King of Majorca; Count of Roussillon and Cerdanya; 1324–1344	Succeeded by Peter I
Preceded by Sancho	Lord of Montpellier; 1324–1349	Succeeded by Charles I
Preceded by John	Prince of Achaea; 1331–1349	Succeeded by Robert
