= Gausfred I =

Count of Empúries and Rosselló

Gausfred I (died 991) was the count of Empúries and Rosselló from 931 until his death. He was the son and successor of Gausbert. He spent his whole life consolidating his authority in his counties, but he divided the realm amongst his sons. By his testament of 989, Empúries and Perelada went to Hugh and Roussillon went to Giselbert.

He married firstly Ava Guisla, probably the daughter of Raymond II, count of Rouergue. By her he had:

- Hugh (c. 965-1040), count of Empúries and Perelada
- Sunyer (died c. 978), bishop of Elna
- Giselbert (died 1013), count of Roussillon
- Guisla

He married secondly Sibylla, with whom he had no children.

Preceded by Gausbert	Count of Empúries; 931–991	Succeeded by Hugh I
Preceded by Gausbert	Count of Rosselló; 931–991	Succeeded by Giselbert I
