= Treaty of Barcelona (1493) =

1493 treaty between France and Aragon

The Treaty of Barcelona was signed on 19 January 1493 between France and the Crown of Aragon. Based on the terms of the agreement, France returned Roussillon and Cerdagne to the Crown of Aragon. In a separate and additional treaty of August that year, Ferdinand II of Aragon promised to maintain neutrality during Charles VIII of France's forthcoming invasion of the Kingdom of Naples.

The two territories had been named earlier in the century as collateral for a loan of 300,000 crowns from France to the King of Aragon, and seized by France in 1462 when the loan was not repaid. The purpose for their retrocession through the Treaty of Barcelona in 1493 was because Charles VIII of France feared that Ferdinand was about to join with Maximilian of Austria and Henry VII of England to foil his recent annexation of Brittany.

== See also ==
- Treaty of Barcelona (1529)
- List of treaties
