= County of Empúries =

Medieval Catalonian county (812–1402)

County of Empúries Comtat d'Empúries (Catalan)
- 812–1402
- Coat of arms

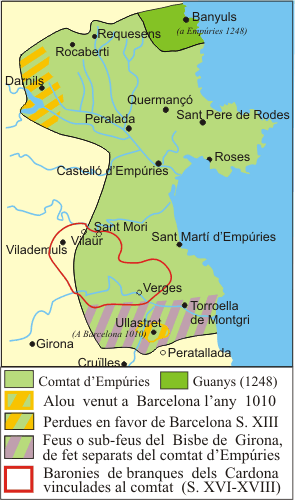
- Territorial evolution of the County of Empúries
- Capital: Sant Martí d'Empúries, later Castelló d'Empúries
- Common languages: Catalan; Latin
- Religion: Roman Catholic
- Government: County
- Historical era: Middle Ages
  - Establishment: 812
  - Annexed into the Principality of Catalonia: 1402
Preceded by	Succeeded by
Emirate of Córdoba	Principality of Catalonia
- Today part of: France; Spain ∟ Catalonia

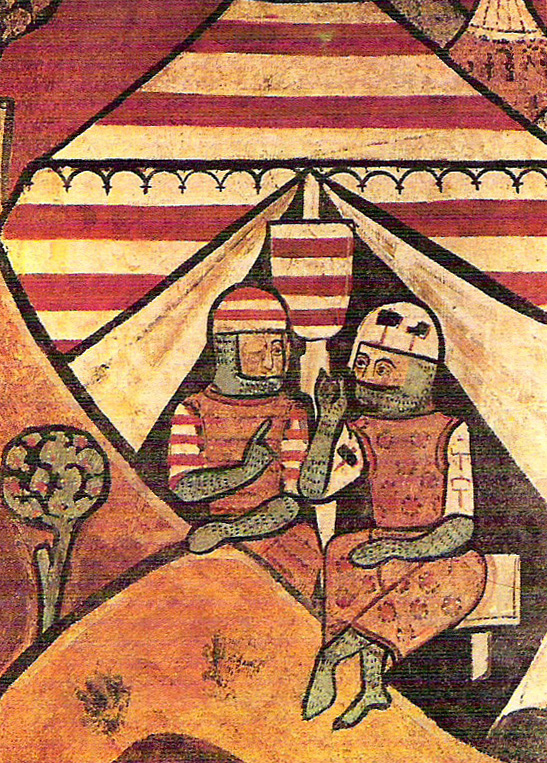
Count Hugh IV of Empúries (left) and Lord Pero Maça of Sangarrén during the war against the Moors in Majorca around 1229. The shield above the figures is the coat-of-arms of Empúries.

Location of the County of Empúries within the Principality of Catalonia

The County of Empúries (Catalan: Comtat d'Empúries, IPA: [kumˈtad dəmˈpuɾiəs]), also known as the County of Ampurias (Spanish: Condado de Ampurias), was a medieval county centred on the town of Empúries and enclosing the Catalan region of Peralada. It corresponds to the historic comarca of Empordà.

After the Franks conquered the regions in 785, Empúries and Peralada came under the authority of the County of Girona. Around 813, Empúries, with Peralada, became a separate county under Ermenguer. He and the other early counts were probably of Visigothic origin. In 817, Empúries was merged with the County of Roussillon, a union which lasted until 989. One of the ninth-century counts of Empúries assembled a fleet powerful enough to conquer the Balearic Islands, but only for a brief time. From 835 to 844, Sunyer I ruled Empúries and Peralada while Alaric I ruled Roussillon and Vallespir.

At the death of Gausfred I in 989, Roussillon and Empúries were separated. Gausfred's elder son Hugh I received Empúries while Giselbert I received Roussillon. Hugh's comital dynasty lasted until 1322, when Empúries passed to a collateral branch of his family.
The last count, Hugh VI, sold the county to Peter IV of Ribagorza in 1325 in exchange for the barony of Pego and the towns of Xaló and Laguar, all located within the Kingdom of Valencia. Peter later traded it with his brother Ramon Berenguer for the county of Prades in 1341. From that point on, Empúries was an apanage of the Crown of Aragon.

In a letter of December 1002, Pope Sylvester II confirmed the county of Empúries and the "county of Pedralbes" as a part of the diocese of Girona. The latter is probably to be identified with the Peralada region in the north of Empúries. A portion of the "taxes of the port", consisting of dues and anchorage, were passed on to the diocese.

== List of counts ==
- Ermenguer 813–817
- Gaucelm 817–832 (united to Roussillon)
- Berengar the Wise 832–835
- Sunyer I 835–841 (united to Roussillon)
- Alaric I 841–844
- Sunyer I 844–848, again
- William 848–850 (united to Roussillon)
- Odalric 852–858 (united to Roussillon)
- Humfrid 858–862 (united to Roussillon)
- Sunyer II 862–915 (united to Roussillon)
- Dela 862–894, associated
- Gausbert 915–931 (united to Roussillon and Perelada as a county)
- Bencion 915–916, associated
- Gausfred I 931–989
- Hugh I 989/91–1040
- Ponç I 1040–1078 (transferred Perelada, as a viscountcy, to his son Berengar)
- Hugh II 1078–1116
- Ponç II 1116–1154, also as Ponç Hug I
- Hugh III 1154–1173
- Ponç III 1173–1200
- Ponç Hug II 1173–1175, associated, also known as Ponç Hug d'Entença
- Hugh IV 1200–1230
- Ponç IV 1230–1269, also as Ponç Hug III
- Hugh V 1269–1277
- Ponç V 1277–1313, also as Ponç Hug IV (also viscount of Bas)
- Ponç VI 1313–1322, also as Ponç Hug V Malgauli (also viscount of Bas)
- Marquesa 1322–1327
- Hugh VI 1322–1325

Empúries sold to a son of King James II of Aragon and becomes an apanage of the Crown of Aragon.

- Peter I 1325–1341
- Raymond Berengar 1341–1364
- John I 1364–1386, 1387–1398
- Peter II 1386–1387, also king of Aragon
- John II 1398–1401
- Peter III 1401–1402, no issue
- Joana I 1402, his wife
- Martin 1402, 1407–1410, also king of Aragon
- Maria de Luna 1402–1407, queen consort of Aragon

Empúries escheated to the crown between 1410 and 1436. Subsequently the title is mostly honorific, and carried by the Dukes of Segorbe.

- Henry I 1436–1445
- Henry II 1445–1522, also Duke of Segorbe
- Alfons I 1522–1563
- Francesc I 1563–1572
- Joana II 1572–1608
- Enric III 1608–1640
- Lluís 1640–1670
- Joaquim 1670, died aged 3.
- Pere IV 1670–1690
- Caterina 1690–1697
- Luis Francisco de la Cerda 1697–1711
- Nicolás Fernández de Córdoba-Figueroa de la Cerda 1711-1739
- Luis Antonio Fernández de Córdoba-Figueroa y Spinola 1739-1768
- Pedro de Alcántara Fernández de Córdoba-Figueroa y de Montcada 1768-1789
- Luis María Fernández de Córdoba y Gonzaga 1789-1806
- Luis Joaquin Fernández de Córdoba y Benavides 1806-1840
- Luis Tomás Fernández de Córdoba y Ponce de León 1840-1873
- Luis María Fernández de Córdoba y Pérez de Barradas 1873-1879
- Luis Jesús María Fernandez de Cordoba y Salabert 1880-1956
- María Victoria Eugenia Fernandez de Cordoba y Fernández de Henestrosa 1956-1987
- Ignacio de Medina y Fernández de Córdoba 1987-2006
- Sol María de La Blanca de Medina Orléans Bragança 2006–
