= Sunyer I of Empúries =

Sunyer I was count of Empúries and Roussillon (with the pagus of Perelada) from 834 to 841.

He was the son of Count Belló I of Carcassonne.

Sunyer I was deposed in 841 due to a new policy of the Frankish Emperor, he died in 848. His eldest son, Sunyer II, was later a count of Empúries and Roussillon (with Perelada) and another son, Delà, was an associate count of his brother.

Preceded by Berengar the Wise	Count of Empúries; 835–841	Succeeded by Alaric I
