= Battle of Llucmajor =

1349 battle

Coordinates: 39°29′N 2°53′E

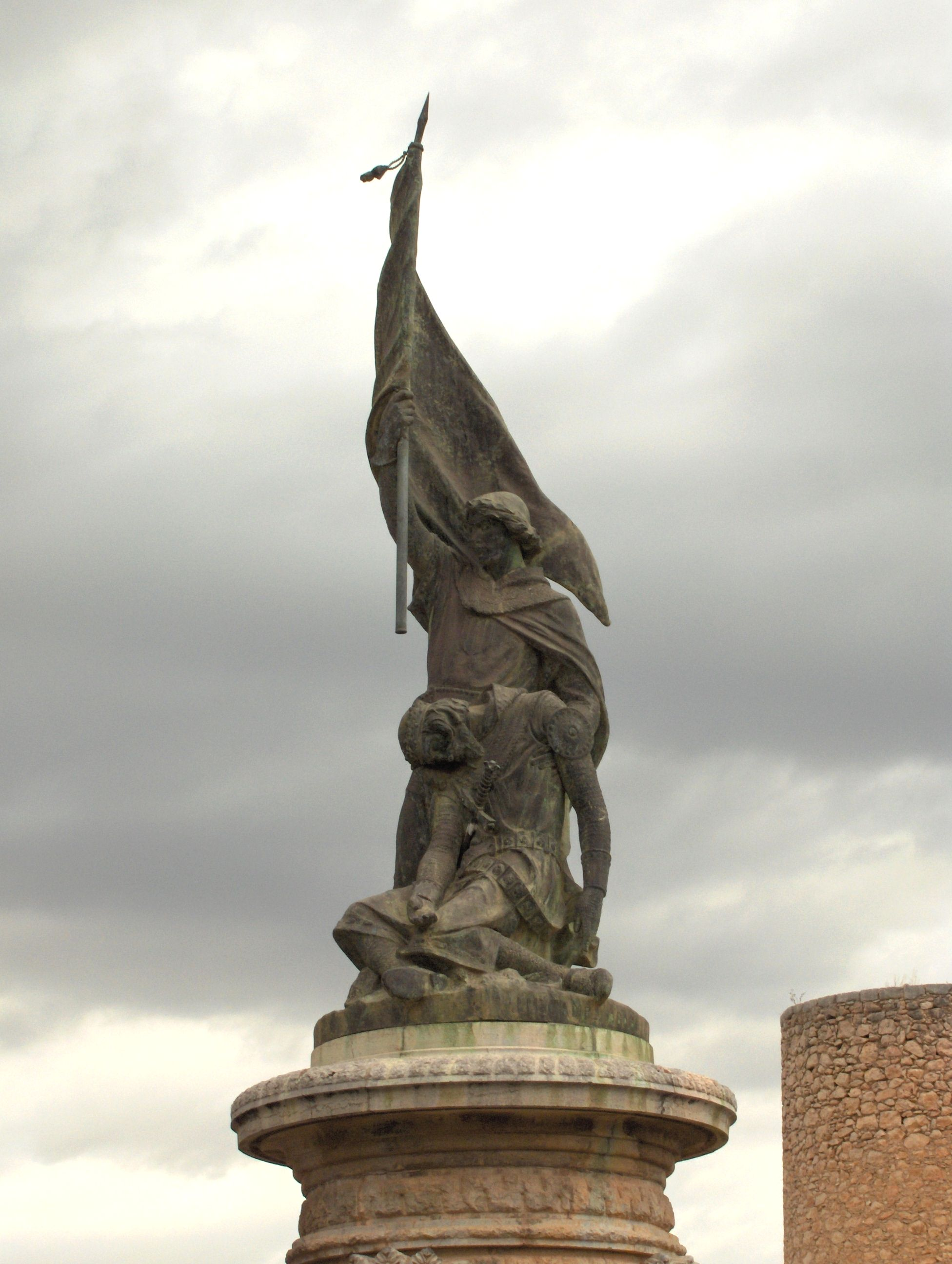
- Sculpture representing James III (killed) and his son James IV, who raises the banner of the Kingdom of Majorca in Llucmajor.
| Date | 25 October 1349 |
| Location | Llucmajor, Balearic Islands |
| Result | Aragonese victory |
| Territorial changes | Annexation of the Kingdom of Majorca |

Belligerents
| Crown of Aragon | Kingdom of Majorca |

Commanders and leaders
| Gilabert de Centelles; Riambau de Corbera | James III of Majorca † |

Casualties and losses
| Unknown | Likely high, army surrendered |

The Battle of Llucmajor (Catalan: Batalla de Llucmajor; IPA: [bəˈtaʎə ðə ˌʎumːəˈʒo]) occurred in 1349 when Peter IV of Aragon's forces defeated and killed his cousin James III of Majorca in the town of Llucmajor on the Balearic Islands, resulting in the end of the independent Kingdom of Majorca.

== Background ==
In 1343, Peter IV of Aragon sought to expand his Kingdom of Aragon towards Greece. However, his ships were unable to pass through Majorcan waters.
Meanwhile, the tensions between King Peter IV of Aragon and his brother-in-law King James III of Majorca over the latter's vassalage towards the former had turned into an open fight. In 1341, Peter IV was accumulating legal grievances against his vassal with the intention of dispossessing him: minting in Perpignan of Barcelona currency, circulation of French currency in Roussillon and failure to appear at the Barcelona court in 1341.
The situation worsened dramatically when James III travelled to Barcelona in 1342 to meet Peter IV, because he accused Peter IV of trying to imprison him. James III returned to Majorca enraged, without his wife and children, who were retained by King Peter, and he considered the vassalage broken. In 1343 the Majorcan king was declared guilty in the process brought against him and stripped of his property and estates.

== Peter IV's conquest of Majorca (1343-1344 ) ==
In the same year 1343, in compliance with the sentence, Peter IV of Aragon invaded Majorca with his fleet and defeated the troops of James III at Santa Ponsa, after which the Islands quickly submitted to him. James III fled to his County of Roussillon.
In two military campaigns in the years 1343 and 1344, separated by a truce, Peter IV of Aragon also conquered the Counties of Roussillon and Cerdanya. James III surrendered in July 1344, with the only condition that his life and liberty were respected. Deprived of most of his Kingdom, only the Lordship of Montpellier remained.

James III did not give up the hope of recovering his states, but the diplomatic mediation of the Pope and the King of France, Philip IV, were useless, as were the two incursions into Cerdanya in 1344 and Conflent in 1347 with the support of Philip VI of France. He then chose to prepare another expedition and reconquer the island of Majorca with the dowry provided by his marriage to Violante of Vilaragut, by selling the Lordship of Montpellier to the King of France, and with the support of Pope Clement VI.

== Expedition by James III (1349) ==
James III organized a fleet and hired mercenaries with the 120.000 gold Thalers from the first term of the sale of the Lordship of Montpellier to the King of France, to reconquer his possessions. He created a fleet of 16 ships: Eight galleys, six ushers, a carrack and a nef. He disembarked at Cap de Formentor and the Port de Pollença on 11 October 1349, and advanced towards Inca. Faced with resistance, he continued inland: on the 22nd he was in Porreres and on the 24th in Llucmajor. The remainder of the fleet sailed to Mallorca. In all, there were 3,000 infantry and 400 men on horseback.

== Battle ==
Gilabert de Centelles, governor of the King of Catalonia-Aragon led the defense against the assault, with reinforcements from Sardinia, brought by Riambau de Corbera. The forces encountered each other at Llucmajor.
The battle lasted all morning long and ended in a tremendous loss, and saw the destruction of the Majorcan army, leading to Peter IV taking over Majorca. King James III died in the battle, while his son James IV was taken prisoner. James III's bastard brother Pagà de Mallorca and many others were also killed.
Queen Violante of Vilaragut and her sister Elisabet, were taken prisoner after the fighting.

== Sources ==
- Gabriel Ensenyat i Pujol, La reintegració de la Corona de Mallorca a la Corona d'Aragó (1343-1349), Mallorca, 1997.
