= Arabic numerals =

Symbols 0, 1, 2, 3, 4, 5, 6, 7, 8, and 9

Arabic numerals set in Source Sans typeface

The Arabic numerals are ten digits (0, 1, 2, 3, 4, 5, 6, 7, 8, and 9) used for writing numbers. The term often also implies a positional notation number with a decimal base, in particular when contrasted with Roman numerals. However, the symbols are also used to write numbers in other bases, as well as non-quantitative identifiers such as a product model or a license plate.

They are also called Western Arabic numerals, Western digits, European digits, ASCII digits, Latin digits or Ghubār numerals to differentiate them from other types of digits. Hindu–Arabic numerals is used due to positional notation (but not these digits) originating in India. The Oxford English Dictionary uses lowercase Arabic numerals while using the fully capitalized term Arabic Numerals for Eastern Arabic numerals. In contemporary society, the terms digits, numbers, and numerals often implies only these symbols, although it can only be inferred from context.

Decimal was perfected using different symbols; the Arabic numerals are a relatively recent development and were designed in North Africa. Europeans first learned of Arabic numerals in about the 10th century, though their spread was a gradual process. After Italian scholar Fibonacci encountered the numerals in the Algerian city of Béjaïa, his 13th-century work Liber Abaci became crucial in making them known in Europe. However, their use was largely confined to Northern Italy until the invention of the printing press in the 15th century. European trade, books, and colonialism subsequently helped popularize the adoption of Arabic numerals around the world. The numerals are used worldwide—significantly beyond the contemporary spread of the Latin alphabet—and have become common in the writing systems where other numeral systems existed previously, such as Chinese and Japanese numerals.

== History ==
=== Origin ===
Evolution of Indian numerals into Arabic numerals and their adoption in Europe

Positional decimal notation including a zero symbol was developed in many ancient cultures, using symbols visually distinct from those that would eventually enter into international use. As the concept spread, the sets of symbols used in different regions diverged over time.

The immediate ancestors of the digits now commonly called "Arabic numerals" were introduced to Europe in the 10th century by Arabic speakers of Spain and North Africa, with digits at the time in wide use from Libya to Morocco. In the east from Egypt to Iraq and the Arabian Peninsula, the Arabs were using the Eastern Arabic numerals or Mashriqi numerals: ٠, ١, ٢, ٣, ٤, ٥, ٦, ٧, ٨, ٩.

Al-Nasawi wrote in the early 11th century that mathematicians had not agreed on the form of the numerals, but most of them had agreed to train themselves with the forms now known as Eastern Arabic numerals. The oldest specimens of the written numerals available are from Egypt and date to 873–874 AD. They show three forms of the numeral "2" and two forms of the numeral "3", and these variations indicate the divergence between what later became known as the Eastern Arabic numerals and the Western Arabic numerals. The Western Arabic numerals came to be used in the Maghreb and Al-Andalus from the 10th century onward. Some amount of consistency in the Western Arabic numeral forms endured from the 10th century, found in a Latin manuscript of Isidore of Seville's Etymologiae from 976 and the Gerbertian abacus, into the 12th and 13th centuries, in early manuscripts of translations from the city of Toledo.

Calculations were originally performed using a dust board (takht, Latin: tabula), which involved writing symbols with a stylus and erasing them. The use of the dust board appears to have introduced a divergence in terminology as well: whereas the Hindu reckoning was called ḥisāb al-hindī in the east, it was called ḥisāb al-ghubār 'calculation with dust' in the west. The numerals themselves were referred to in the west as ashkāl al‐ghubār 'dust figures' or qalam al-ghubār 'dust letters'. Al-Uqlidisi later invented a system of calculations with ink and paper 'without board and erasing' (bi-ghayr takht wa-lā maḥw bal bi-dawāt wa-qirṭās).

A popular myth claims that the symbols were designed to indicate their numeric value through the number of angles they contained, but there is no contemporary evidence of this, and the myth is difficult to reconcile with any digits past 4.

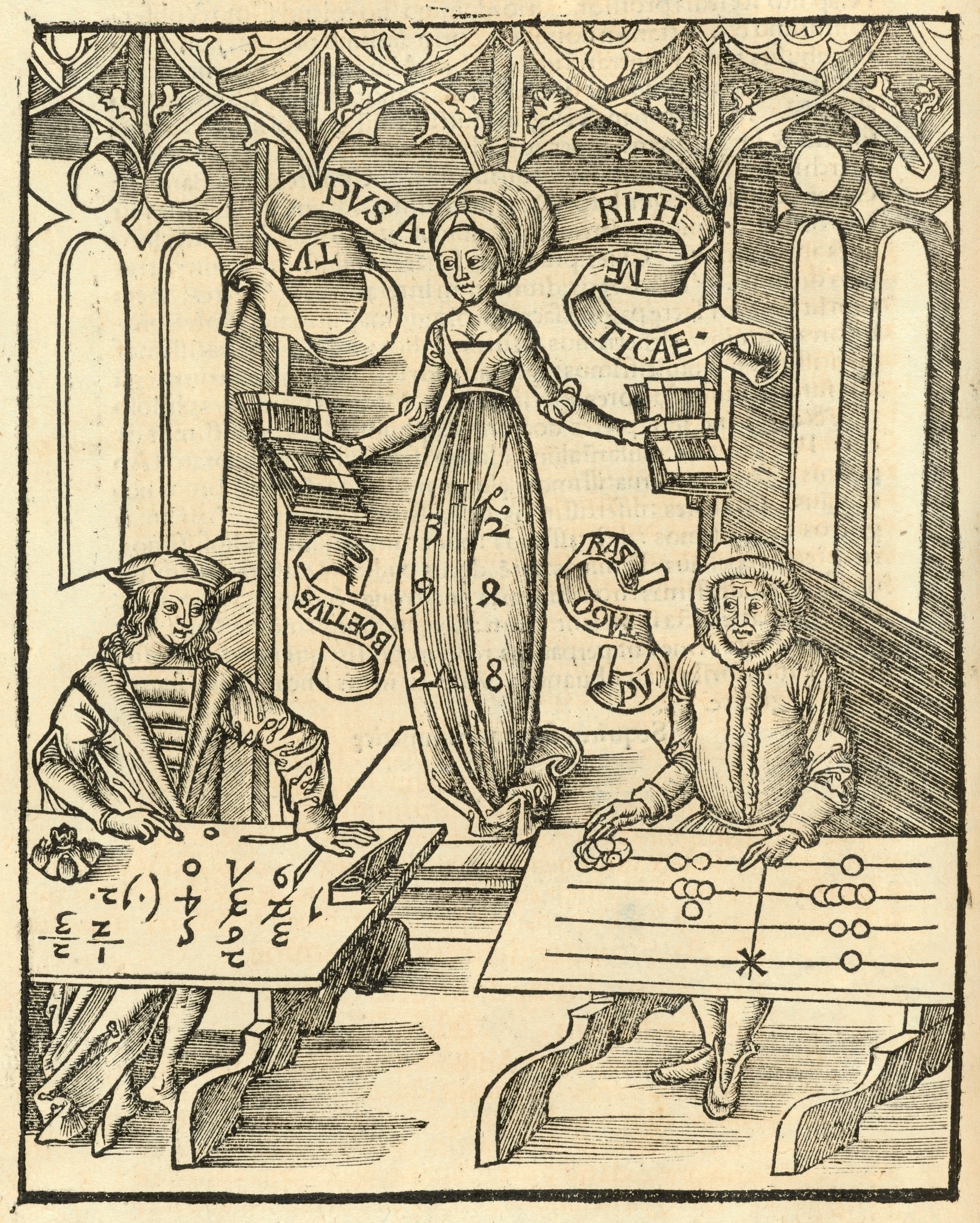
Etching published 1503 showing usage of Arabic numerals

=== Adoption and spread ===
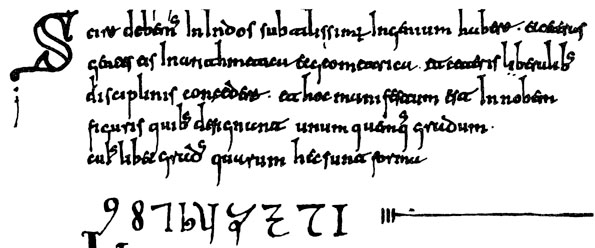
The first Arabic numerals in the West appeared in the Codex Vigilanus in Spain.

The first mentions of the numerals from 1 to 9 in the West are found in the 976 Codex Vigilanus, an illuminated collection of various historical documents covering a period from antiquity to the 10th century in Al Andalus. Other texts show that numbers from 1 to 9 were occasionally supplemented by a placeholder known as sipos, represented as a circle or wheel, reminiscent of the eventual symbol for zero. The Arabic term for zero is ṣifr (صفر), transliterated into Latin as cifra, which became the English word cipher.

From the 980s, Gerbert of Aurillac (later Pope Sylvester II) used his position to spread knowledge of the numerals in Europe. Gerbert studied in Barcelona in his youth. He was known to have requested mathematical treatises concerning the astrolabe from Lupitus of Barcelona after he had returned to France.

The reception of Arabic numerals in the West was gradual and lukewarm, as other numeral systems circulated in addition to the older Roman numbers. As a discipline, the first to adopt Arabic numerals as part of their own writings were astronomers and astrologists, evidenced from manuscripts surviving from mid-12th-century Bavaria. Reinher of Paderborn (1140–1190) used the numerals in his calendrical tables to calculate the dates of Easter more easily in his text Computus emendatus.

==== Italy ====
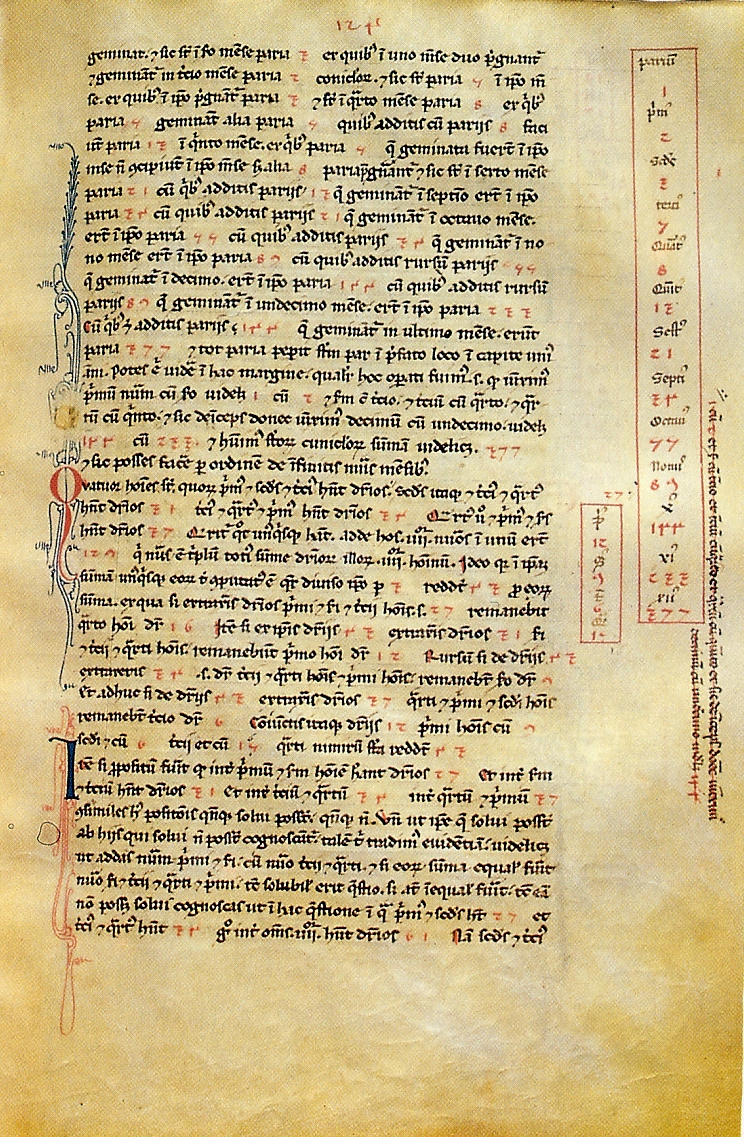
A page of the Liber Abaci. The list on the right shows the Fibonacci sequence: 1, 2, 3, 5, 8, 13, 21, 34, 55, 89, 144, 233, 377. The 2, 8, and 9 resemble Arabic numerals more than Eastern Arabic numerals or Indian numerals.

Fibonacci was a Pisan mathematician who had studied in the Pisan trading colony of Bugia (modern name Béjaïa), in what is now Algeria, and he endeavored to promote the numeral system in Europe with his 1202 book Liber Abaci:

When my father, who had been appointed by his country as public notary in the customs at Bugia acting for the Pisan merchants going there, was in charge, he summoned me to him while I was still a child, and having an eye to usefulness and future convenience, desired me to stay there and receive instruction in the school of accounting. There, when I had been introduced to the art of the Indians' nine symbols through remarkable teaching, knowledge of the art very soon pleased me above all else and I came to understand it.

The Liber Abaci's analysis highlighting the advantages of positional notation was widely influential. Likewise, Fibonacci's use of the Béjaïa digits in his exposition ultimately led to their widespread adoption in Europe. Fibonacci's work coincided with the European commercial revolution of the 12th and 13th centuries centered in Italy. Positional notation facilitated complex calculations (such as currency conversion) to be completed more quickly than was possible with the Roman system. In addition, the system could handle larger numbers, did not require a separate reckoning tool, and allowed the user to check their work without repeating the entire procedure. Late medieval Italian merchants did not stop using Roman numerals or other reckoning tools: instead, Arabic numerals were adopted for use in addition to their preexisting methods.

==== Wider Europe ====
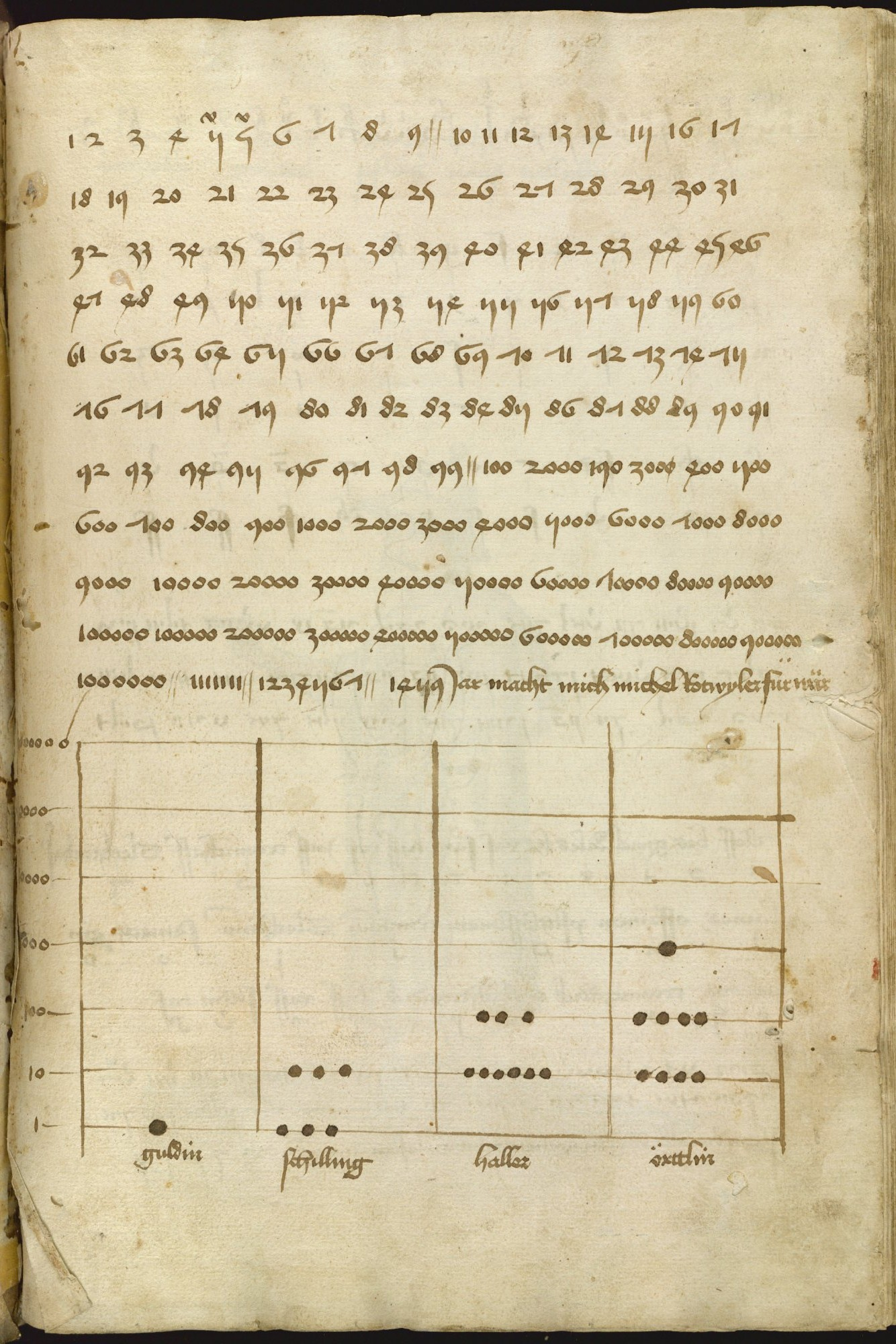
A German manuscript page teaching use of Arabic numerals (Talhoffer Thott, 1459), presented together with the Hebrew alphabet and astrology

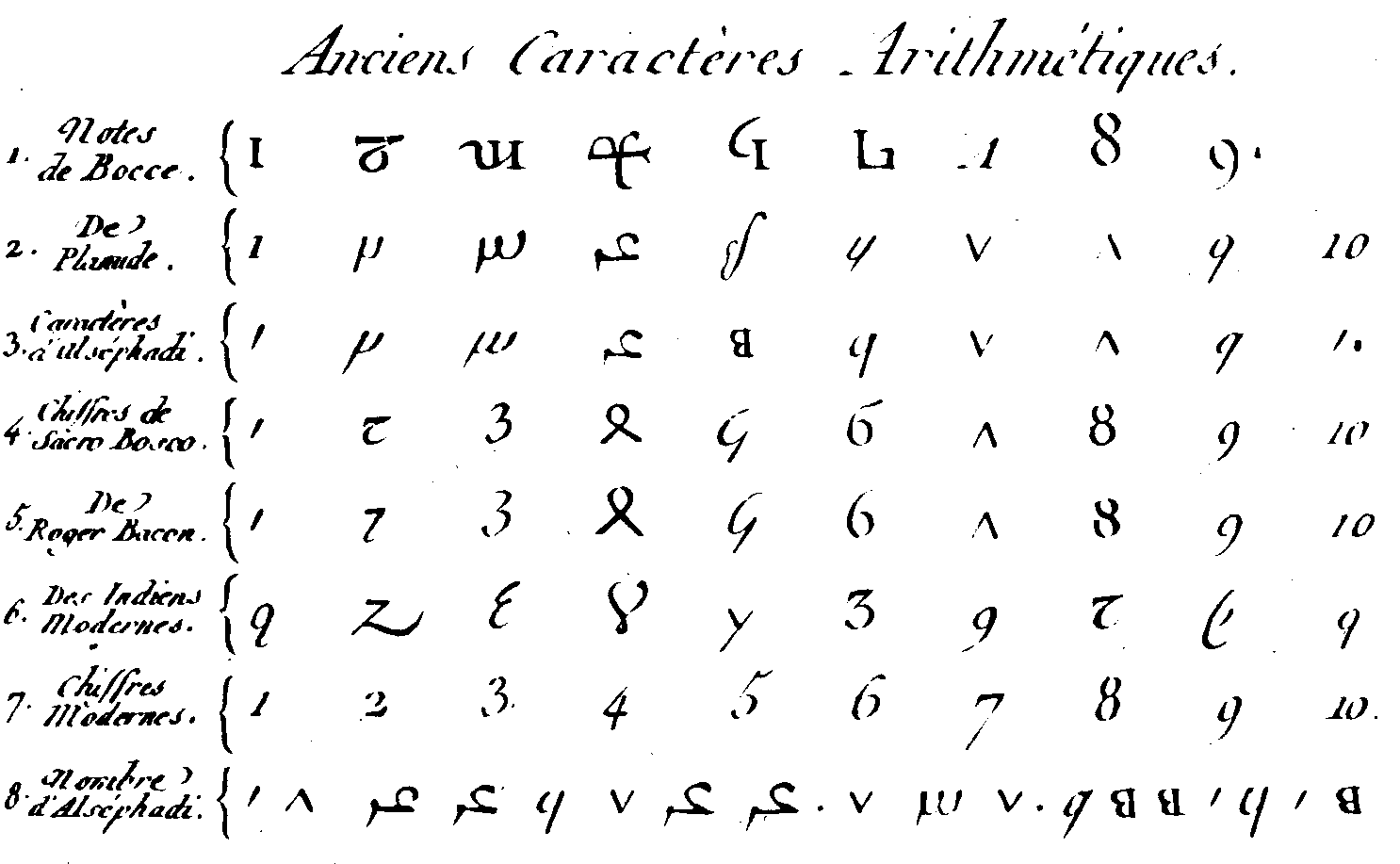
Table of numerals in many variants, 1757, by Jean-Étienne Montucla

By the late 14th century, only a few texts using Arabic numerals appeared outside Italy. This suggests that the use of Arabic numerals in commercial practice, and the significant advantage they conferred, remained a virtual Italian monopoly until the late 15th century. This may in part have been due to language barriers: although Fibonacci's Liber Abaci was written in Latin, the Italian abacus traditions were predominantly written in Italian vernaculars that circulated in the private collections of abacus schools or individuals.

The European acceptance of the numerals was accelerated by the invention of the printing press, and they became widely known during the 15th century. Their use grew steadily in other centers of finance and trade such as Lyon. Early evidence of their use in Britain includes: an equal hour horary quadrant from 1396, in England, a 1445 inscription on the tower of Heathfield Church, Sussex; a 1448 inscription on a wooden lych-gate of Bray Church, Berkshire; and a 1487 inscription on the belfry door at Piddletrenthide church, Dorset; and in Scotland a 1470 inscription on the tomb of the first Earl of Huntly in Elgin Cathedral. In central Europe, the King of Hungary Ladislaus the Posthumous, started the use of Arabic numerals, which appear for the first time in a royal document of 1456.

By the mid-16th century, they had been widely adopted in Europe, and by 1800 had almost completely replaced the use of counting boards and Roman numerals in accounting. Roman numerals were mostly relegated to niche uses such as years and numbers on clock faces.

==== Russia ====
Prior to the introduction of Arabic numerals, Cyrillic numerals, derived from the Cyrillic alphabet and Greek numerals, were used by South and East Slavs. The system was used in Russia as late as the early 18th century, although it was formally replaced in official use by Peter the Great in 1699. Reasons for Peter's switch from the alphanumerical system are believed to go beyond a surface-level desire to imitate the West. Historian Peter Brown makes arguments for sociological, militaristic, and pedagogical reasons for the change. At a broad, societal level, Russian merchants, soldiers, and officials increasingly came into contact with counterparts from the West and became familiar with the communal use of Arabic numerals. Peter also covertly travelled throughout Northern Europe from 1697 to 1698 during his Grand Embassy and was likely informally exposed to Western mathematics during this time. The Cyrillic system was found to be inferior for calculating practical kinematic values, such as the trajectories and parabolic flight patterns of artillery. With its use, it was difficult to keep pace with Arabic numerals in the growing field of ballistics, whereas Western mathematicians such as John Napier had been publishing on the topic since 1614.

==== China ====
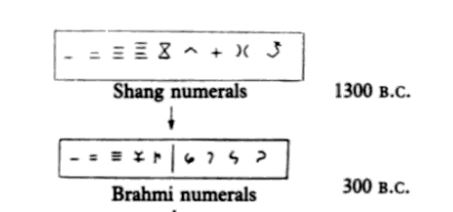
Chinese Shang dynasty oracle bone numerals of 14th century BC

The Chinese Shang dynasty numerals from the 14th century BC predate the Indian Brahmi numerals by over 1,000 years and show substantial similarity to the Brahmi numerals. Similar to the modern Arabic numerals, the Shang dynasty numeral system was also decimal based and positional.

While positional Chinese numeral systems such as the counting rod system and Suzhou numerals had been in use prior to the introduction of modern Arabic numerals, the externally-developed system was eventually introduced to medieval China by the Hui people. In the early 17th century, European-style Arabic numerals were introduced by Spanish and Portuguese Jesuits.

== Encoding ==
The numerals are encoded in virtually all character sets including ASCII, Unicode (which includes ASCII) and even Morse code. With ASCII and therefore Unicode, masking all but the four least-significant binary digits gives the value of the decimal digit, a design decision facilitating the digitization of text. EBCDIC uses a different offset, but is designed for a similar masking operation.

Digit	ASCII (decimal)	Unicode	EBCDIC (hex)
0	48	U+0030 DIGIT ZERO	F0
1	49	U+0031 DIGIT ONE	F1
2	50	U+0032 DIGIT TWO	F2
3	51	U+0033 DIGIT THREE	F3
4	52	U+0034 DIGIT FOUR	F4
5	53	U+0035 DIGIT FIVE	F5
6	54	U+0036 DIGIT SIX	F6
7	55	U+0037 DIGIT SEVEN	F7
8	56	U+0038 DIGIT EIGHT	F8
9	57	U+0039 DIGIT NINE	F9

== See also ==
- Arabic numeral variations
- Regional variations in modern handwritten Arabic numerals
- Seven-segment display
- Text figures

== Sources ==
- Kunitzsch, Paul (2003). "The Transmission of Hindu–Arabic Numerals Reconsidered". In J. P. Hogendijk; A. I. Sabra (eds.). The Enterprise of Science in Islam: New Perspectives. MIT Press. pp. 3–22. ISBN 978-0-262-19482-2.
