= Sunifred =

Sunifred or Sunifredo is a Germanic given name, probably of Gothic origin, the name of two counts of Urgell, one of whom was also count of Barcelona:

- Suniefred (fl. 690s), Visigoth who carried out a rebellion against the Visigothic king Egica
- Sunifred II of Ampurias (c. 840–915)
- Sunifred, Count of Barcelona (844–848)
- Sunifred II, Count of Urgell (911–948)
- Lupitus of Barcelona may be identified with a Christian monk named Sunifred
