= Castellet Castle =

Castillo de Castellet
- Catalonia in Spain
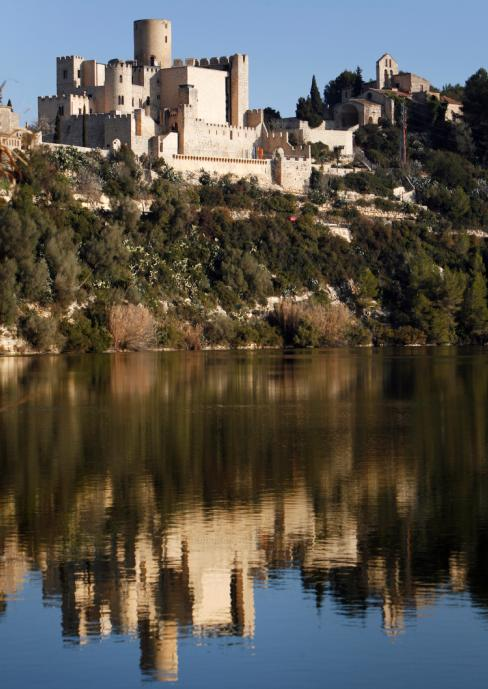
- Castellet Castle

Location
- Coordinates: 41°15′52.92″N 1°38′10″E

Castellet Castle (Spanish:Castillo de Castellet) is a castle located in the Alt Penedès region of Spain. Built in the 10th century, the castle is designed in the Romanesque style.

== History ==
Castellet Castle was established in 977 during the reign of Borrell II, Count of Barcelona.
