= Radulf of Barcelona =

Spanish Catholic bishop

Radulf of Barcelona was a Catholic Bishop of northern Spain between (about 885–942).

Born the son of Count Wifred the Hairy and Guinidilda of Empúries.

In 888 he was sent to the Monastery of Santa Maria de Ripoll where he eventually became abbot, but left in 900. He was consecrated bishop of Urgell in 914. As bishop he built several parish churches
