= Battle of Rovirans =

985 battle during the Reconquista

- Part of the Reconquista
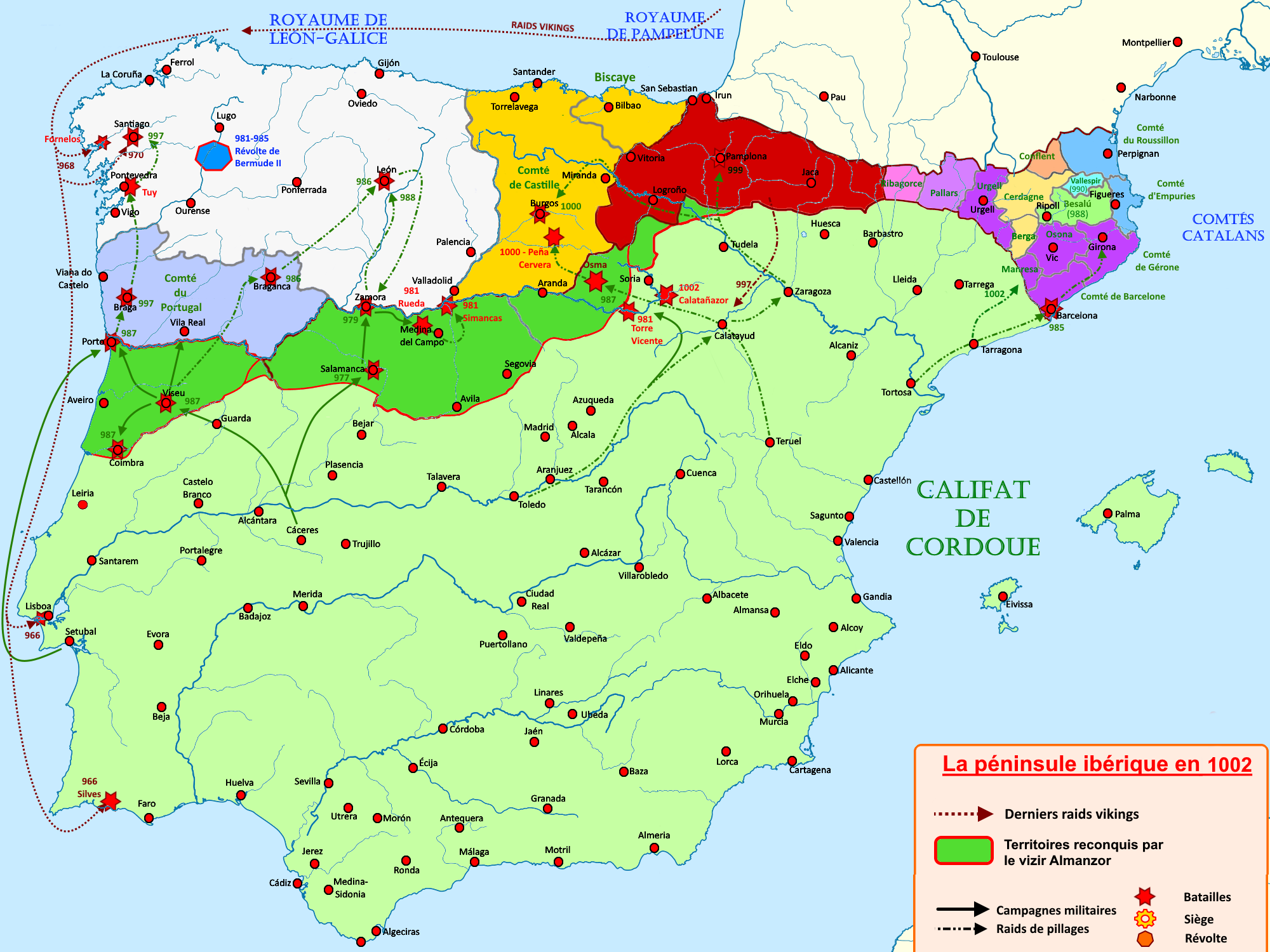
- Campaigns of Almanzor in Iberia
Date	985
Location	Near Terrassa, County of Barcelona (present-day Spain) 41°33′40″N 2°0′29″E
Result	Cordoban victory

Belligerents
Caliphate of Córdoba	County of Barcelona

Commanders and leaders
Almanzor	Borrell II

Strength
Unknown	Unknown

Casualties and losses
Unknown	500 knights killed

The Battle of Rovirans or Matabous was fought in 985 near Terrassa, between the Christian troops of Borrell II and the Muslim troops of Almanzor. The troops of Borell were defeated and Almanzor was able to continue with his campaign, reaching as far as Barcelona, which he sacked.

== Battle ==
Almanzor left Córdoba on May 5, 985, and headed to Murcia to stock up on provisions for the expedition, which followed the Mediterranean coast, collecting cavalry in Valencia and Tortosa, while Gaspar Feliu and Montfort returned to Toledo and passed through Zaragoza and Lleida.

Borrell II tried to stop him and waited for him in Rovirans, near Terrassa but he was defeated. Five hundred Barcelonian knights died and were beheaded.

== Aftermath ==
Borrell II, his son Ramon Borrell and the cavalry that survived retreated towards Caldes de Montbui but were again defeated in Manresa and had to hide in the woods. Almanzor headed for Barcelona, a city that he razed to the ground and where many of its citizens were taken prisoner. Almanzor left a garrison in the city before leaving but it was recaptured by Borrell in the same year.
