= Richilda of Toulouse =

Richilda, Countess of Barcelona
- Born: c. 895; Toulouse
- Noble family: House of Toulouse
- Spouse: Sunyer, Count of Barcelona
- Issue: Ermengol; Miro, Count of Barcelona; Borrell II, Count of Barcelona; Adelaide/Bonafilla; Wifred
- Father: Ermengol of Rouergue

Richilda (born c. 895) was Countess of Barcelona, Girona and Ausona from at least 917 to her husband's retirement in 947. She appears in record as married to Sunyer, Count of Barcelona for the first time in 917 but may have been sooner. She is speculated to have been a daughter of the Count of Rouergue, possibly Ermengol of Rouergue, based on the introduction of novel names into the family. They had four sons and a daughter: Ermengol, Miró, Borrell, Adelaide (also called Bonafilla), and Wifred.
