= Wilfred II Borell =

9th-century Catalan nobleman

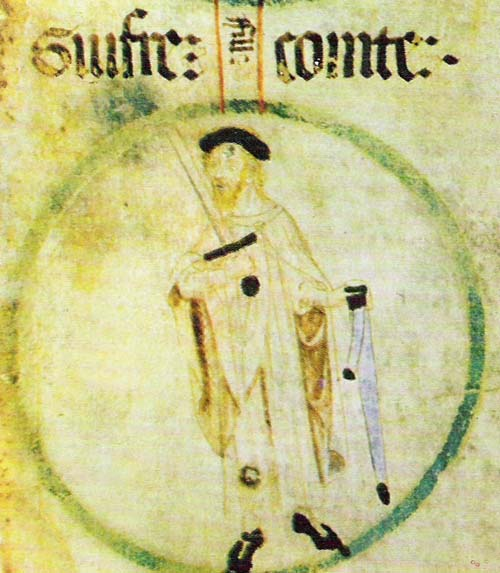

Wilfred II or Wifred II, also known as Borrell I or Borrel I (Guifré II Borrell I in Catalan), was Count of Barcelona, Girona, and Ausona from 897 to 911, succeeding his father, Wilfred I the Hairy. His mother was Guinedilda.

Upon his father's death, the patrimony was divided between his sons Wilfred ΙΙ, Sunifred ΙΙ, Miró and Sunyer. Sunyer (the youngest) assisted Wilfred II in the governing of his three counties, as he was a minor at their father's death. Upon Wilfred II's death in 911, his counties passed to Sunyer. Wilfred II founded and was buried at Sant Pau del Camp monastery in Barcelona. The executor of his testament was Bishop Idalguer of Vic.

Preceded by Wilfred the Hairy	Count of Barcelona; 897–911	Succeeded by Sunyer
Preceded by Wilfred the Hairy	Count of Gerona; 897–911	Succeeded by Sunyer
Preceded by Wilfred the Hairy	Count of Ausona; 897–911	Succeeded by Sunyer
