= Idalguer =

Idalguer (Latin: Hidelherius, Idelherus; died 914) was the second bishop of Vic (899–914) after the see was re-founded. He played a leading role in re-organising the diocese, consecrating churches at Lluçà, Manlleu and Sant Julià de Vilatorta.

At the council of Barcelona in 906 Idalguer averred that "there was not a single Christian left alive in Osona" after the rebellion of Aizo in 826–27 until the re-settlement initiated in 878 by Count Wifred I, the Hairy. He attributes the reconquista and repoblación to divine mercy: "the Lord had mercy on those lands, he raised up in them the most noble prince Wifred". He was thus one of the first propagandists for the Bellonid family. His account before the council of the poverty of his diocese led to a remittance of the annual tribute owed to the archdiocese of Narbonne.

In 908 Idalguer had a will drawn up. He himself was the executor of the will of Count Wifred II in 911.
