= Sunyer of Barcelona =

Spanish noble

Sunyer, Count of Barcelona
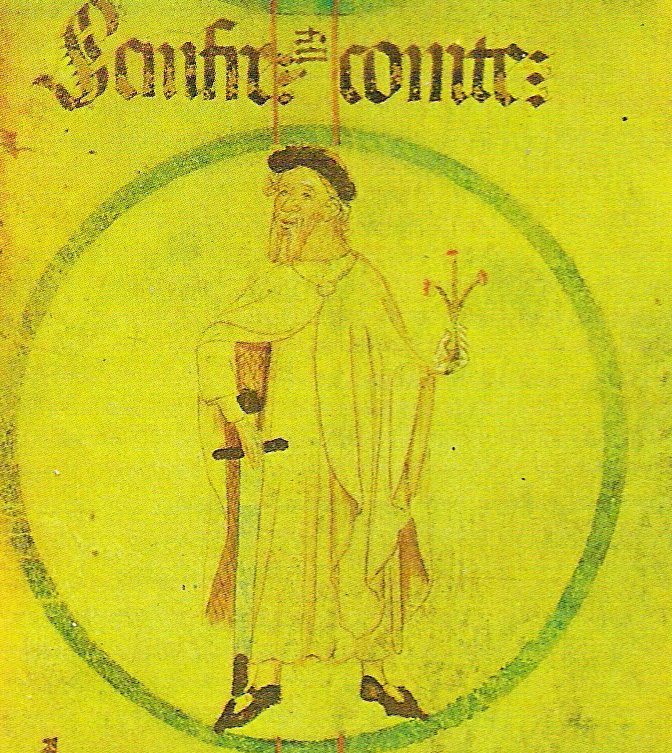
- Sunyer, Count of Barcelona
- Born: c. 870
- Died: 950
- Noble family: House of Barcelona
- Spouse: Richilda of Toulouse
- Issue: Ermengol; Miro, Count of Barcelona; Borrell II, Count of Barcelona; Adelaide/Bonafilla; Wifred
- Father: Wilfred the Hairy
- Mother: Guinidilda

Sunyer (c. 870 – 950) was count of Barcelona, Girona and Ausona from 911 to 947.

== Origins ==
He was the son of Wilfred the Hairy and younger brother of the previous count of Barcelona, Wilfred II Borrel. He worked jointly with his brother in the government of the counties held by their father after his death in 897. He did not reign independently until his brother's death in 911.

== Family conflict ==
However, on the death of his uncle, Count Radulf I of Besalú, in 913 or 920, a conflict emerged between Sunyer and his brother Count Miró II of Cerdanya over the succession of the County of Besalú. In exchange for the total renunciation of all claims on the County of Barcelona, Sunyer gave up his claim on Besalú.

Sunyer was apparently married by 917, and later appears with wife Richilda of Toulouse, speculated to have been a daughter of the Count of Rouergue based on the introduction of novel names into the family. They had four sons and a daughter: Ermengol, Miró, Borrell, Adelaide (also called Bonafilla), and Wifred. Ermengol of Ausona, the eldest, governed the county of Osona during his father's lifetime. He died on 21 August between 939 and 943 in a battle near Baltarga, possibly against the Hungarians.

== Politics ==
Sunyer made important efforts with domestic politics, protected the church and strengthened its institutions by giving it more land and income. He also continued to encourage the repopulation of the county of Ausona.

He abandoned the defensive stance adopted by his predecessors and took up the fight actively against the Moorish states to the south. Battles were fought at Lleida and Tarragona. At the same time he managed to retain diplomatic relations with Córdoba, which had increasingly lost control of its northern provinces. In 912, Muhammad al-Tawil, the Wāli of Huesca and Lleida, attacked and destroyed the Barcelonian army under Sunyer in the Tàrrega valley. However Sunyer's counterattack in 914 successfully pushed them back and resulted in the death of al-Tawil. He subsequently repopulated the county of Penedès, which had been the scene of many conflicts between the Frankish and Muslim empires, as far as Olèrdola (929).

From 936 to 937 he led an expedition against the Muslims. As a result of this successful campaign many of the enemy forces were killed, including the Qadi of Valencia. The Moors temporarily abandoned Tarragona (which became a no-man's land), while Tortosa was forced to pay a tribute to the count. This gain was short-lived however, as Abd ar-Rahman III sent envoys and a fleet to Barcelona in 940, forcing Sunyer into a subservient alliance and to abandon a marriage pact he had reached with king García Sánchez I of Pamplona, who was to marry (or had already married) Sunyer's daughter.

In 947 Sunyer retired to monastic life and ceded the government of his realms to his sons: Borrell II and Miró I. He died in the Monastery of La Grassa (in Conflent) in 950.

Preceded by Wilfred II	Count of Barcelona; 911–947	Succeeded by Borrel II and Miró I
