= Barcelona astrolabe =

The Barcelona astrolabe is the oldest astrolabe with Carolingian characters that has survived in the Christian Occident. The French researcher Marcel Destombes founded the astrolabe, and left it as legacy to the Institute of the Arab World of Paris in 1983.

The Academy of Sciences of Barcelona asked the astrolabe in loan to the Musée of l'Institut du Monde Arabe, to make a replica, today this replica is on display at the Academy of Sciences in the Ramblas.

== Description ==
This astrolabe presents some unusual characteristics. All the engraved characters are in Latin, this fact made the scholars think that the instrument was made in Christian Europe. The pointers of his "spider" indicate eighteen stars: ten boreal stars and eight austral stars (that is to say, situated beneath of the equator). Eleven of them correspond to the date of 980 AD. Still like this, the names of the stars are not engraved on the brass. The words ROMA and FRANCIA are engraved in Latin characters in one of the eardrums. These characters are accompanied by the numbers 41-30 (in Arabic figures). The characters are identical to those used at the end of the 10th century in the Catalan Latin manuscripts, being Catalonia in that moment a mark of the Carolingian France. This would explain the presence of the word FRANCIA. The figures express in degrees and minutes: 41° 30′, which correspond exactly to the latitude of Barcelona.

The fact of having engraved the date 980 AD. and the latitude of Barcelona (41–30), which archdeacon in those dates was Sunifred Llobet, to whom is attributed the authorship of the Ripoll manuscript: ms.225, which contains the description of an astrolabe, has led the scholars to attribute the paternity of the astrolabe to this famous astronomer.

== Data ==
- Name: Astrolabe of Barcelona
- Place of manufacture: Barcelona, Principality of Catalonia
- Date / period: To the year 980
- Material and technical: Brass decorated with recorded
- Dimensions: 15,2 cm of diameter
- Conservation (city): Paris
- Conservation (place): Bequeathed by Marcel Destombes to the Musée of l'Institut du Monde Arabe (Paris)
- Number of inventory: AY 86-31

== See also ==
- Gerbert of Aurillac
