= Arnold Scholasticus =

Arnold Scholasticus was an 11th century monk of the Benedictine abbey of Santa Maria, Ripoll (Catalonia). He served the community as scholaster, calligrapher, painter, and notary, considerably enhancing the reputation of the monastic school and the scriptorium.

He was the author of Qualiter corpus beati Stephani de Ierosolimis Constantinopolim sit translatum, xix kal. ianuarii, a reworking of a text by Anastasius Bibliothecarius on the translation of the remains of Saint Stephen from Jerusalem to Constantinople. He also painted animals in imitation of Roman mosaic in the apse of the abbey church.
