= Pope Sylvester II =

Head of the Catholic Church from 999 to 1003

- Bishop of Rome
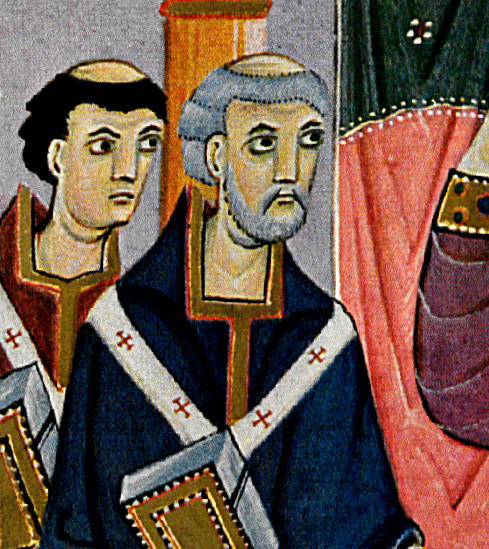
- Sylvester, in blue, as depicted in the Gospels of Otto III
- Church: Catholic Church
- Papacy began: 2 April 999
- Papacy ended: 12 May 1003
- Predecessor: Gregory V
- Successor: John XVII

Orders
- Consecration: 991

Personal details
- Born: Gerbertus (Gerbert) c. 946 Belliac (?), Duchy of Aquitaine, France
- Died: 12 May 1003 (aged c. 57) Rome, Papal States

Pope Sylvester II (Latin: Silvester II; c. 946 – 12 May 1003), originally known as Gerbert of Aurillac, (Note: Other names include Gerbert of Reims or Ravenna or Auvergne and Gibert.) was a scholar and teacher who served as the bishop of Rome and led the Papal States from 999 until his death in 1003. He endorsed and promoted study of Moorish and Greco-Roman arithmetic, mathematics and astronomy, reintroducing to Western Christendom the abacus, armillary sphere, and water organ, which had been lost to Latin Europe since the fall of the Western Roman Empire. He is said to be the first in Christian Europe (outside of Al-Andalus) to introduce the decimal numeral system using the Hindu–Arabic numeral system.

== Early life ==
Gerbert was born about 946, or at any rate between 945 and 950. His exact birthplace is unknown, but it must have been in what was then the Duchy of Aquitaine, part of the Kingdom of France. More precise proposals include the town of Belliac, near the present-day commune of Saint-Simon, Cantal, or Aurillac. Another speculated location is the province of Auvergne. Gerbert's parents, wanting him to have a quality education, took him to receive instruction at the nearby Benedictine Abbey. Here, Gerbert became a pupil of a monk named Raimund, who admired his desire for knowledge and assisted him in his studies.

Around 963, he entered the Monastery of St. Gerald of Aurillac. In 967, Count Borrell II of Barcelona (947–992) visited the monastery, and the abbot asked the count to take Gerbert with him so that he could study mathematics in Catalonia and acquire there some knowledge of Arabic learning. While away from the monastery, Gerbert pursued studies in Barcelona, and also received Arabic instruction at Seville and Córdoba.

== Scholarly work ==
Gerbert studied under the direction of Bishop Atto of Vich, some 60 km north of Barcelona, and probably also at the nearby Monastery of Santa Maria de Ripoll. Like all Catalan monasteries, it contained manuscripts from Muslim Spain and especially from Córdoba, one of the intellectual centres of Europe at that time: the library of al-Hakam II, for example, had thousands of books (from science to Greek philosophy). This is where Gerbert was introduced to mathematics and astronomy. Borrell II was facing major defeat from the Andalusian powers so he sent a delegation to Córdoba to request a truce. Bishop Atto was part of the delegation that met with al-Ḥakam II, who received him with honour. Gerbert was fascinated by the stories of the Mozarab Christian bishops and judges who dressed and talked like the Moors, well-versed in mathematics and natural sciences like the great teachers of the Islamic madrasahs. This sparked Gerbert's veneration for the Moors and his passion for mathematics and astronomy.

=== Abacus and numerals ===
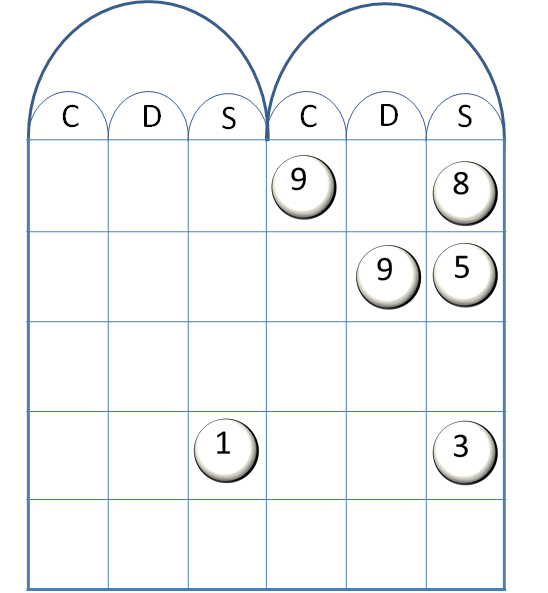
Model of the addition 908+95 on part of Gerbert's abacus (with modern numerals, not Gerbert's ones)

Gerbert learned of Hindu–Arabic digits and applied this knowledge to the abacus, but probably without the numeral zero. (Note: Charles Seife: "He probably learned about the numerals during a visit to Spain and brought them back with him when he returned to Italy. But the version he learned did not have a zero.") According to the 12th-century historian William of Malmesbury, Gerbert got the idea of the computing device of the abacus from a Moorish scholar from University of Al-Qarawiyyin. The abacus that Gerbert reintroduced into Europe had its length divided into 27 parts with 9 number symbols (this would exclude zero, which was represented by an empty column) and 1,000 characters in all, crafted out of animal horn by a shieldmaker of Rheims. According to his pupil Richer, Gerbert could perform speedy calculations with his abacus that were extremely difficult for people in his day to think through using only Roman numerals. Due to Gerbert's reintroduction, the abacus became widely used in Europe once again during the 11th century.

Bernelinus of Paris, who was probably a pupil of Gerbert, wrote a book called the Liber Abaci (not to be confused with Fibonacci's Liber Abaci) where he discussed the abacus' design. In this book, he individually introduced the "Hindu-Arabic" symbols the abacus used and related them to the more common Latin numerical nouns. Bernelinus' Liber Abaci has survived in 11 manuscripts from the 11th and 12th centuries. In two of them, probably the oldest ones, the number 3 is reproduced in a form that differs from the other manuscripts. This symbol is reminiscent of the "Tironian note" for the Latin word "ter" from the Roman shorthand. The reason for this is not known, but it is speculated that Bernelinus did not want to use an "unbeliever" symbol to indicate the number that represents the Holy Trinity.

=== Armillary sphere and sighting tube ===
Although lost to Europe since the terminus of the Greco-Roman era, Gerbert reintroduced the astronomical armillary sphere to Latin Europe via the Islamic civilization of Al-Andalus, which was at that time at the "cutting edge" of civilization. The details of Gerbert's armillary sphere are revealed in letters from Gerbert to his former student and monk Remi of Trèves and to his colleague Constantine, the abbot of Micy, as well as the accounts of his former student and French nobleman Richer, who served as a monk in Rheims. Richer stated that Gerbert discovered that stars coursed in an oblique direction across the night sky. Richer described Gerbert's use of the armillary sphere as a visual aid for teaching mathematics and astronomy in the classroom.

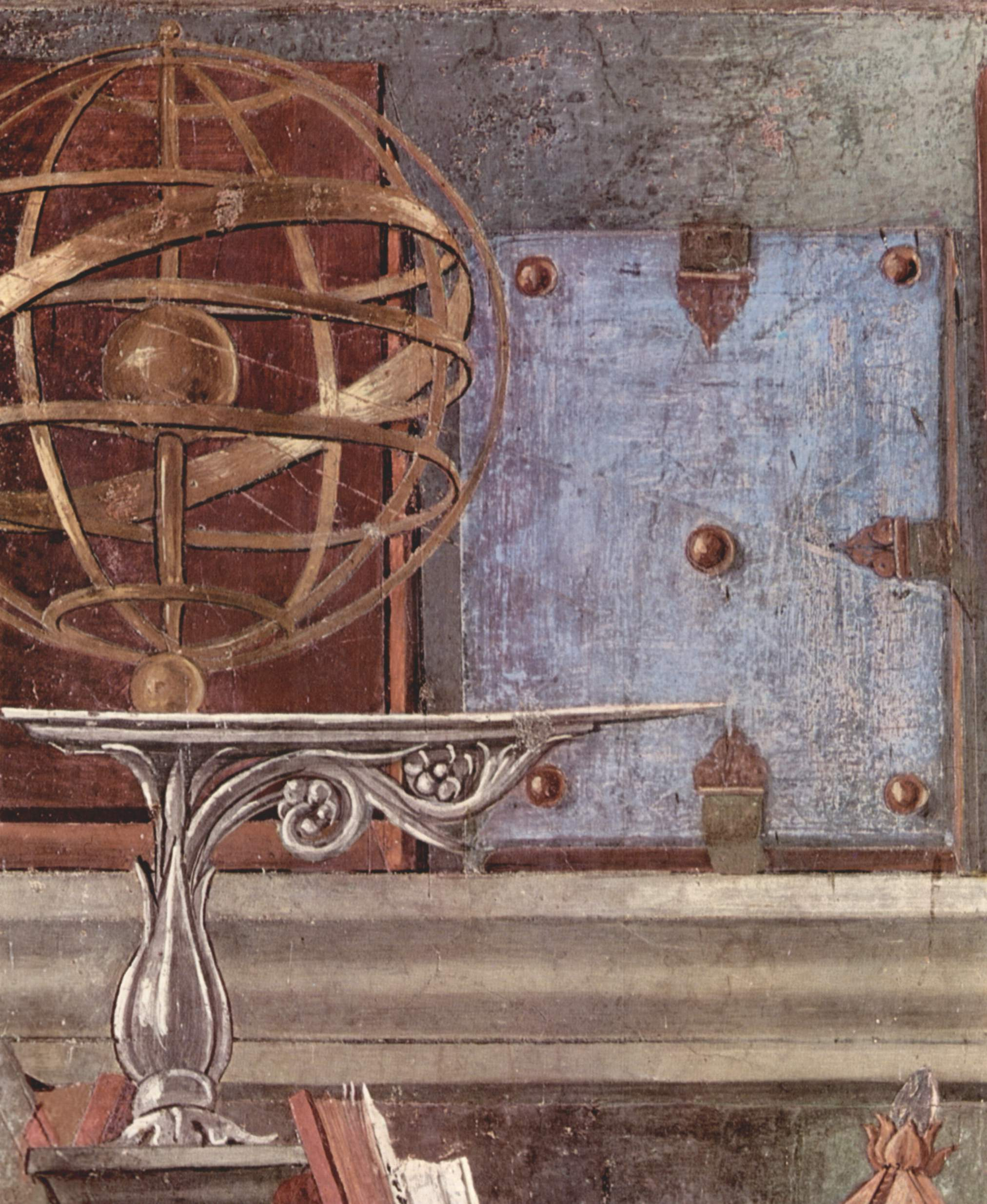
An armillary sphere in a painting by Sandro Botticelli, c. 1480

Historian Oscar G. Darlington asserts that Gerbert's division by 60 degrees instead of 360 allowed the lateral lines of his sphere to equal to six degrees. By this account, the polar circle on Gerbert's sphere was located at 54 degrees, several degrees off from the actual 66° 33'. His positioning of the Tropic of Cancer at 24 degree was nearly exact, while his positioning of the equator was correct by definition. Richer also revealed how Gerbert made the planets more easily observable in his armillary sphere:

He succeeded equally in showing the paths of the planets when they come near or withdraw from the earth. He fashioned first an armillary sphere. He joined the two circles called by the Greeks coluri and by the Latins incidentes because they fell upon each other, and at their extremities he placed the poles. He drew with great art and accuracy, across the colures, five other circles called parallels, which, from one pole to the other, divided the half of the sphere into thirty parts. He put six of these thirty parts of the half-sphere between the pole and the first circle; five between the first and the second; from the second to the third, four; from the third to the fourth, four again; five from the fourth to the fifth; and from the fifth to the pole, six. On these five circles he placed obliquely the circles that the Greeks call loxos or zoe, the Latins obliques or vitalis (the zodiac) because it contained the figures of the animals ascribed to the planets. On the inside of this oblique circle he figured with an extraordinary art the orbits traversed by the planets, whose paths and heights he demonstrated perfectly to his pupils, as well as their respective distances.

Richer wrote about another of Gerbert's last armillary spheres, which had sighting tubes fixed on the axis of the hollow sphere that could observe the constellations, the forms of which he hung on iron and copper wires. This armillary sphere was also described by Gerbert in a letter to his colleague Constantine. Gerbert instructed Constantine that, if doubtful of the position of the pole star, he should fix the sighting tube of the armillary sphere into position to view the star he suspected was it, and if the star did not move out of sight, it was thus the pole star. Furthermore, Gerbert instructed Constantine that the north pole could be measured with the upper and lower sighting tubes, the Arctic Circle through another tube, the Tropic of Cancer through another tube, the equator through another tube, and the Tropic of Capricorn through another tube.

=== Scientific library ===
In late 984, Gerbert sent a letter to abbot Eberhard of Tours concerning the foundation of a large scientific library. He dedicated immense sums of money to establishing the library and purchasing texts from a wide variety of western European authors. He wrote to many monks and abbots in Europe requesting classical literature from their monasteries. Gerbert was also able to acquire some work from earlier era authors such as Cicero and Statius. Two specific requests Gerbert made that documentation exists for are letters sent to Lupitus of Barcelona and Bishop Miró Bonfill of Girona, asking the former for an astrology book and the latter for an arithmetic book. It can be inferred from this that the library contained many volumes of books covering a wide variety of topics, but the exact size and influence the library had is seemingly unknown.

== Ecclesiastical career ==
In 969, Borrell II made a pilgrimage to Rome, taking Gerbert with him. There Gerbert met Pope John XIII and Emperor Otto I. The pope persuaded Otto I to employ Gerbert as a tutor for his young son, Otto II. Some years later, Otto I gave Gerbert leave to study at the cathedral school of Rheims where he was soon appointed a teacher by Archbishop Adalberon in 973. He remained in this position until 989, with the only gap being his time as the head of the monastery of Bobbio from 981 to 983. When Otto II became sole emperor in 973, he appointed Gerbert the abbot of the monastery of Bobbio and also appointed him as count of the district, but the abbey had been ruined by previous abbots, and Gerbert soon returned to Rheims. After the death of Otto II in 983, Gerbert became involved in the politics of his time. In 985, with the support of his archbishop, he opposed King Lothair of France's attempt to take Lorraine from Emperor Otto III by supporting Hugh Capet. Hugh became king of France, ending the Carolingian line of kings in 987.

Adalberon died on 23 January 989. Gerbert was a natural candidate for his succession, but King Hugh appointed Arnulf, an illegitimate son of King Lothair, instead. Arnulf was deposed in 991 for alleged treason against Hugh, and Gerbert was elected his successor. There was so much opposition to Gerbert's elevation to the See of Rheims, however, that Pope John XV (985–996) sent a legate to France who temporarily suspended Gerbert from his episcopal office. Gerbert sought to show that this decree was unlawful, but a further synod in 995 declared Arnulf's deposition invalid. Gerbert then became the teacher of Otto III, and Pope Gregory V (996–999), Otto III's cousin, appointed him archbishop of Ravenna in 998.

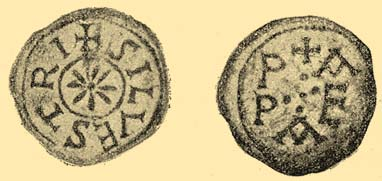
Seal of Sylvester II

With imperial support, Gerbert was elected to succeed Gregory V as pope in 999. Gerbert took the name of Sylvester II, alluding to Sylvester I (314–335), the advisor to Emperor Constantine I (324–337). Soon after he became pope, Sylvester II confirmed the position of his former rival Arnulf as archbishop of Rheims. As pope, he took energetic measures against the widespread practices of simony and concubinage among the clergy, maintaining that only capable men of spotless lives should be allowed to become bishops. In 1001, the Roman populace revolted, forcing Otto III and Sylvester II to flee to Ravenna. Otto III led two unsuccessful expeditions to regain control of the city and died on a third expedition in 1002. Sylvester II returned to Rome soon after the emperor's death, although the rebellious nobility remained in power, and he died a little later. Sylvester is buried in St. John Lateran.

== Legacy ==
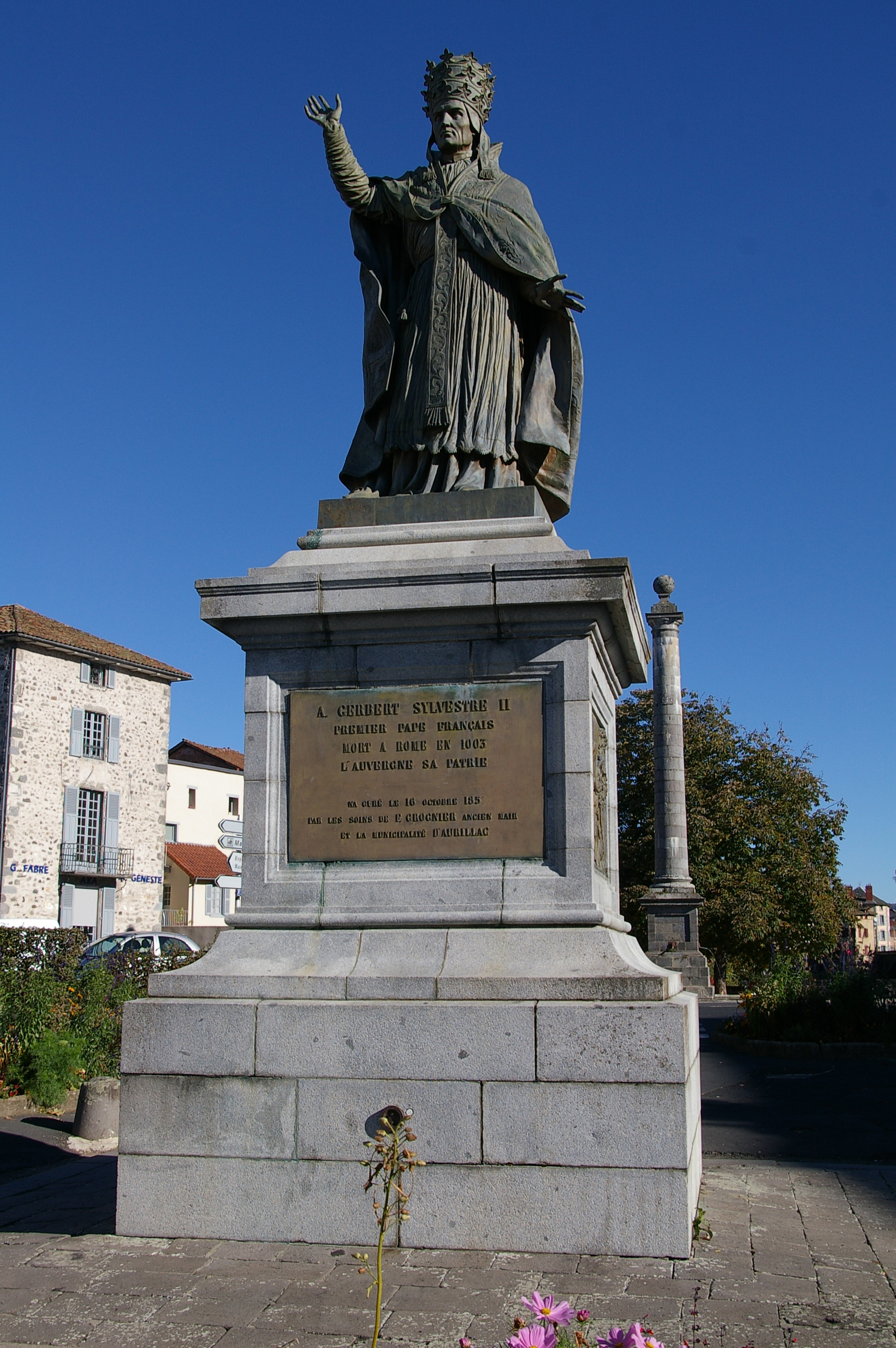
Statue of Pope Sylvester II in Aurillac, France

Gerbert of Aurillac was a noted humanist. He read Virgil, Cicero and Boethius; he studied Latin translations of Porphyry and Aristotle. He had a very accurate classification of the different disciplines of philosophy. He was the first French pope.

Gerbert was said to be one of the most noted scientists of his time. Gerbert wrote a series of works dealing with matters of the quadrivium (arithmetic, geometry, astronomy, music), which he taught using the basis of the trivium (grammar, logic, and rhetoric). In Rheims, he constructed a hydraulic-powered organ with brass pipes that excelled all previously known instruments, where the air had to be pumped manually. In a letter of 984, Gerbert asks Lupitus of Barcelona for a book on astrology and astronomy, two terms historian S. Jim Tester says Gerbert used synonymously. Gerbert is sometimes credited with the invention of the first mechanical clock in 996, though it was perhaps only an elaborate water clock, as the verge and foliot does not appear to have been invented until the 13th century. Gerbert may have been the author of a description of the astrolabe that was edited by Hermannus Contractus some 50 years later. Besides these, as Sylvester II he wrote a dogmatic treatise, De corpore et sanguine Domini—On the Body and Blood of the Lord.

=== Legends ===
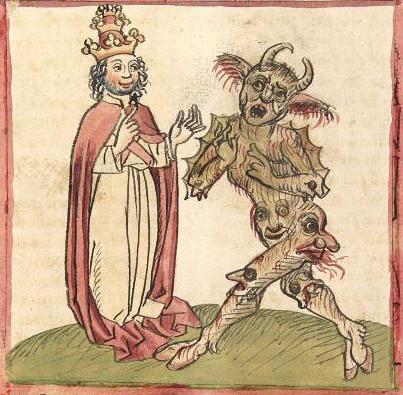
Pope Sylvester II and the Devil in an illustration of c. 1460

The legend of Gerbert grows from the work of the English monk William of Malmesbury in De Rebus Gestis Regum Anglorum and a polemical pamphlet, Gesta Romanae Ecclesiae contra Hildebrandum, by Cardinal Beno, a partisan of Emperor Henry IV who opposed Pope Gregory VII in the Investiture Controversy. According to the legend, Gerbert traveled to Spain in order to further his knowledge of the lawful arts, as defined by the quadrivium. Gerbert quickly became more knowledgeable than anyone around him in mathematics, astronomy, and astrology. This is the point in William of Malmesbury's testimony where Gerbert is said to have begun learning the dark arts. During Gerbert's time in Spain, he was said to live with a Saracen philosopher, who was responsible for giving this knowledge to Sylvester. This knowledge was first obtained through using money and promises as bartering chips for the philosopher's books, which Gerbert translated and learned from. Despite his efforts, there was one book that Gerbert was not able to coax from the philosopher. This book was said to contain all of the knowledge the Saracen philosopher had on the dark arts. After resorting to using wine, and intimacy with his daughter, Gerbert was able to steal the book from under the philosopher's pillow while he slept. Gerbert fled, pursued by the victim, who could trace the thief by the stars, but Gerbert was aware of the pursuit, and hid hanging from a wooden bridge, where, suspended between heaven and earth, he was invisible to the magician.

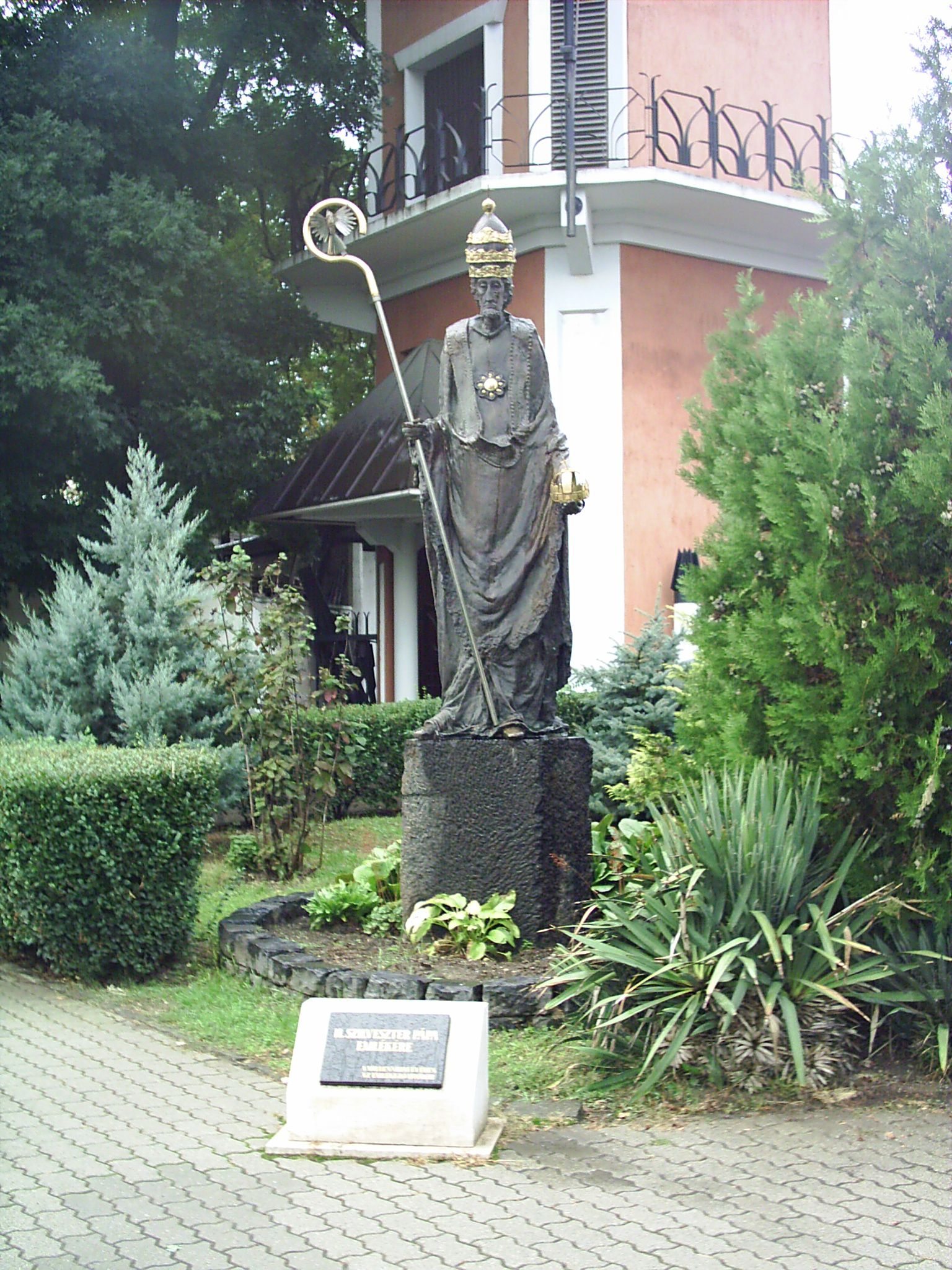
Statue of Pope Sylvester II in Budapest, Hungary

Gerbert was supposed to have built a brazen head. This "robotic" head would answer his questions with "yes" or "no". He was also reputed to have had a pact with a female demon called Meridiana, who had appeared after he had been rejected by his earthly love, and with whose help he managed to ascend to the papal throne (another legend tells that he won the papacy playing dice with the Devil).

According to the legend, Meridiana (or the bronze head) told Gerbert that if he should ever read a Mass in Jerusalem, the Devil would come for him. Gerbert then cancelled a pilgrimage to Jerusalem, but when he read Mass in the church Santa Croce in Gerusalemme ("Holy Cross of Jerusalem") in Rome, he became sick soon afterwards and, dying, he asked his cardinals to cut up his body and scatter it across the city. In another version, he was even attacked by the Devil while he was reading the Mass, and the Devil mutilated him and gave his gouged-out eyes to demons to play with in the Church. Repenting, Sylvester II then cut off his hand and his tongue.

The inscription on Gerbert's tomb reads in part Iste locus Silvestris membra sepulti venturo Domino conferet ad sonitum ("This place will yield to the sound [of the last trumpet] the limbs of buried Sylvester II, at the advent of the Lord", mis-read as "will make a sound") and has given rise to the curious legend that his bones will rattle in that tomb just before the death of a pope.

The story of the crown and papal legate authority allegedly given to Stephen I of Hungary by Sylvester in the year 1000 (hence the title 'apostolic king') is noted by the 19th-century historian Lewis L. Kropf as a possible forgery of the 17th century. Likewise, the 20th-century historian Zoltan J. Kosztolnyik states that "it seems more than unlikely that Rome would have acted in fulfilling Stephen's request for a crown without the support and approval of the emperor."

Though the testimony of William of Malmesbury did much to discredit and defame Gerbert, there were many important intellectual distinctions made from it. For example, the legend of Gerbert of Aurilac's talking head helped to describe the line between prohibited and permitted knowledge. Gerbert did work in music theory, mathematics, geometry, and several other fields accepted and taught in the quadrivium. All of the works he did related to these subjects were not brought into question and were accepted as well as appreciated. But works done outside of the accepted liberal arts was condemned, including things learned from bird's songs and flight patterns, as well as the necromancy he was rumored to have taken part in.

=== Honours ===
Hungary issued a commemorative stamp honouring Pope Sylvester II on 1 January 1938, and France honoured him in 1964 by issuing a postage stamp.

== Works ==
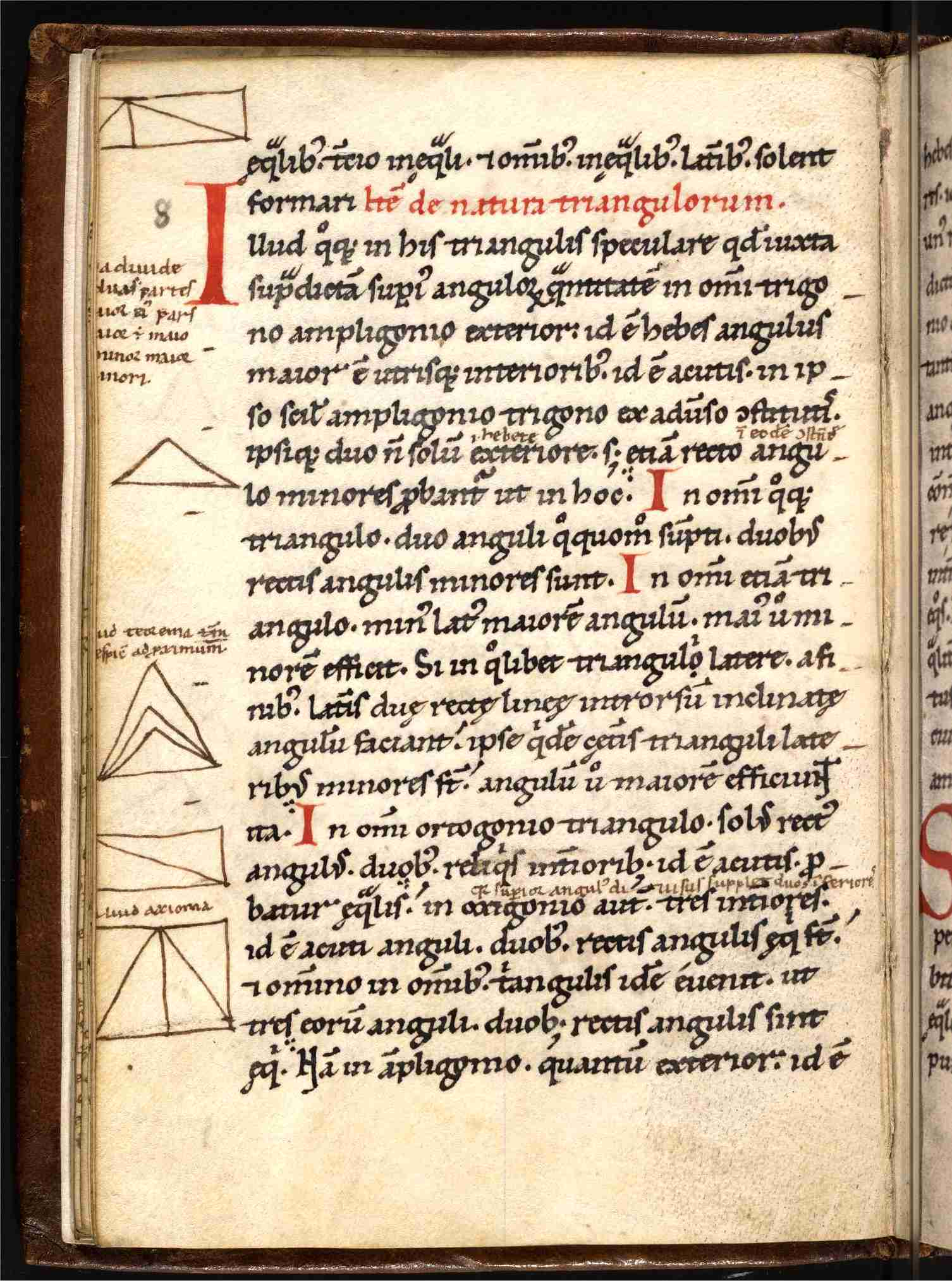
12th century copy of De geometria

Gerbert's writings were printed in volume 139 of the Patrologia Latina. Darlington notes that Gerbert's preservation of his letters might have been an effort of his to compile them into a textbook for his pupils that would illustrate proper letter writing. His books on mathematics and astronomy were not research-oriented; his texts were primarily educational guides for his students.

Mathematical writings

- Libellus de numerorum divisione
- De geometria
- Regula de abaco computi
- Liber abaci
- Libellus de rationali et ratione uti

Ecclesiastical writings

- Sermo de informatione episcoporum
- De corpore et sanguine Domini
- Selecta e concil. Basol., Remens., Masom., etc.

Letters

- Epistolae ante summum pontificatum scriptae (218 letters, including letters to the emperor, the pope, and various bishops)
- Epistolae et decreta pontificia (15 letters to various abbots and bishops, including Arnulf)
  - a dubious letter to Otto III
  - five short poems

Other writings

- Acta concilii Remensis ad S. Basolum
- Leonis legati epistola ad Hugonem et Robertum reges
- Celibacy for the guarantee of our future

== In popular culture ==
- Gerbert D'Aurillac appears as an adversary in Deborah Harkness' novel series called the All Souls Trilogy. He is portrayed by Trevor Eve in the trilogy's television adaptation.
- Gerbert d'Aurillac is the protagonist of Judith Tarr's 1989 novel Ars Magica.
- Gerbert d'Aurillac is referred to in the first chapter of Mikhail Bulgakov's novel The Master and Margarita.
- Legends about Gerbert D'Aurillac as Pope Sylvester II inspired the short story "The Demon Pope" by Richard Garnett, first published in the original, 1888 edition of The Twilight of the Gods and Other Tales.
- In Anatole France's The Revolt of the Angels, Nectaire (a fallen angel) speaks of this Gerbert: "We taught them letters and sciences. A mouthpiece of their god, one Gerbert, took lessons in physics, arithmetic, and music with us, and it was said that he had sold us his soul." Then "The successors of the studious Gerbert, not content with the possession of souls (the profits one gains thereby are lighter than air), wished to possess bodies also."

== See also ==
- Barcelona astrolabe
- List of Catholic clergy scientists

== Notes ==
Catholic Church titles
Preceded by Arnulf	Archbishop of Reims; 991–996	Succeeded by Arnulf
Preceded by John X	Archbishop of Ravenna; 998–999	Succeeded by Leo II
Preceded by Gregory V	Pope; 999–1003	Succeeded by John XVII
