= Wilfred the Hairy =

Count of Barcelona and other counties (died 897)

Wilfred I
- Count of Barcelona
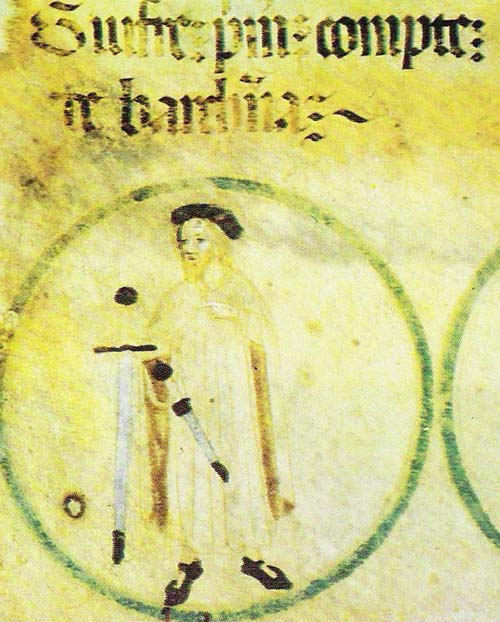
- Genealogical roll from the Cistercian abbey of Poblet
- Reign: 878–897
- Predecessor: Bernard of Gothia
- Successor: Wifred II, Count of Barcelona
- Born: Girona, County of Conflent, Francia
- Died: 11 August 897
- Buried: Monastery of Santa Maria de Ripoll
- Spouse: Guinidilda
- Issue: Emma; Wilfred II Borrel; Sunifred ΙΙ; Sunyer; Miró; Rodolfo; Riquilla; Ermesinde; Cixilona ?Guinidilda
- Father: Sunifred, Count of Barcelona

Wilfred or Wifred, called the Hairy (in Catalan: Guifré el Pilós), (died 11 August 897) was Count of Urgell (from 870), Cerdanya (from 870), Barcelona (from 878), Girona (from 878, as Wilfred II), Besalú (from 878) and Ausona (from 886). On his death in 897, his son, Wilfred Borrell, inherited these counties, known by the historiography as the Catalan counties.

He was responsible for the repopulation of the long-depopulated no-man's land around Vic (the county of Ausona, a frontier between Christians and Muslims), the re-establishment of the bishopric of Vic and the foundation of the Monastery of Santa Maria de Ripoll, where he is buried.

== Historical significance ==
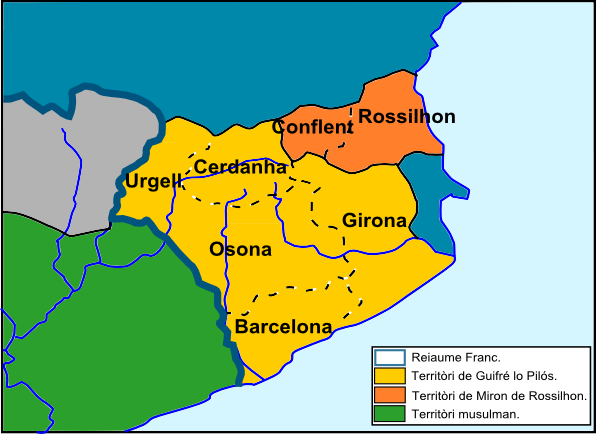
Wilfred's territories in yellow

Wilfred was the Count of Barcelona (878–897) who created the tradition of hereditary passage of titles. His son, Wilfred Borrell, inherited the county without any interruption and held it from 897 to 911.

A number of primitive feudal entities developed in the Marca Hispánica during the 9th century. They were generally agrarian, self-sufficient, and ruled by a small military elite. This pattern in Catalonia was similar to that found in similar border lands or marches elsewhere in Europe.

Traditionally the Count of Barcelona was appointed directly by the Carolingian (Frankish) emperor, for example the appointment of Bera in 801. The appointment of heirs could not be taken for granted. However, with the rise of strong counts such as Sunifred (fl. 844–848) and Wilfred, and the weakening of Carolingian royal power, the appointment of heirs eventually become a formality. This trend resulted in the counts becoming de facto independent of the Carolingian crown under Borrell II in 985.

== Origins ==
The Legend of Guifré el Pilós originally placed his birth near Prades, in the County of Conflent, one of the Catalan counties of the Spanish March; however, historians concluded that he was born in Girona, Catalonia, in northeastern Spain.

According to legend, he was the son of Wilfred of Arriaount (or Wilfred of Arri), a county near Prades. His father was murdered by Salomón and Wilfred became his avenger, killing the assassin. After the research done by French monks Dom De Vic and Dom Vaissete, authors of Histoire Générale de Languedoc, he is identified as the son of Sunifred I of Barcelona, count of many counties under Louis the Pious and Charles the Bald. Wilfred's mother may have been named Ermesende. Sunifred may have been the son of Belló, Count of Carcassonne during the reign of Charlemagne, or more probably, his son-in-law. Thus, as a descendant of Sunifred and his brother, Sunyer I, count of Empúries and Roussillon (834–848), Wilfred is considered to be a member of a Bellonid dynasty by Ramon d'Abadal and other historians.

== Investiture ==
The Bellonid lineage lost its power when Sunifred and Sunyer died in 848, but was revived slightly by the appointment of Dela and Sunyer II, sons of Sunyer I, to the countship of Empúries in 862. Later, at an assembly at Attigny in June 870, Charles the Bald made their cousins, Wilfred the Hairy and his brother Miró (known as the Old), counts of Urgell and Cerdanya, and Conflent, respectively. For in that year, the poorly-chronicled Solomon, count of Urgell, Cerdanya, and Conflent, had died.

After becoming Count of Urgell and Cerdanya in 870, Wilfred received the counties of Barcelona, Girona, and Besalú in 878 from the Carolingian king of France, Louis the Stammerer. His reign coincided with the crumbling of Carolingian authority and unity. Wilfred was thus the last count of the Hispanic March appointed by the French king and the first to pass his vast holdings as an inheritance to his sons (albeit sanctioned by the monarch).

Wilfred came into possession of Barcelona through his service to Charles the Bald against the rebel Bernard of Gothia, Count of Barcelona, Roussillon, and numerous other Septimanian counties. Wilfred, Miró, their brother Sunifred (who became the Abbot of Arles), and Lindoí, the Viscount of Narbonne, marched against Bernard on behalf of King Charles and his son, Louis the Stammerer. In March and April 878, they defeated the nobles loyal to Bernard, including Sigebuto, Bishop of Narbonne, and expelled all partisan priests from the church.

At the Council of Troyes in August 878, presided over by Pope John VIII and King Louis II the Stammerer, Wilfred was formally invested as Count of Urgell and Cerdanya, Miró as Count of Conflent, Sunyer as Count of Empúries, and Oliba II as Count of Carcassonne. On 11 September 878, Bernard was dispossessed of all his titles. Bernard's former possessions were given to Wilfred (Barcelona with Ausona, Girona, and Besalú) and Miró (Roussillon). The counties of Narbonne, Béziers, and Agde were separated from that of Barcelona. Sunifred was made Abbot of Arles, Riculf Bishop of Elna, and the Bishops of Urgell, Girona, and Barcelona were confirmed in their sees. Wilfred immediately ceded Besalú to his brother Radulph (878–920).

== Intervention in Ausona ==
After the investiture of 878, Wilfred's lands stretched from Urgell and Cerdanya in the Pyrenees to Girona, and Barcelona on the Mediterranean coast. This was the first time since the reign of his father (which ended in 848) that these different areas had been united politically and the only other time within the 9th century. The land between these regions—Ripollès, Vall de Lord, Berguedà, Lluçanès, the Plana de Vic, Moianès, Guilleries, and Bages—had long been depopulated due to the rebellion of Aissó in 827, but was considered territory belonging to the Count of Barcelona since 820, when it was given to Rampon upon the death of Borrell, the first Count of Urgell, Cerdanya, and Ausona.

Wilfred embarked on the process of repopulating these territories with immigrants from the heavily populated mountain regions—Pallars, Urgell, and Cerdanya—to which people had fled in the two centuries between the collapses of Visigothic and Carolingian authority. Wilfred's plan involved repopulating and subsequently annexing the counties to those he already controlled. Thus, Vall de Lord became part of Urgell and Berguedà part of Cerdanya. Wilfred re-created the County of Ausona from the remaining counties of Ripollés, Lluçanès, the Plana de Vic, and Guilleries—centred around the city of Ausa, a region which in ancient times had been ethnically and culturally distinct, inhabited by the descendants of the Ausetani. ^{(ref is prob Lewis, A.R. - needs to be checked)} To Ausona, Wilfred also attached Moianés and Bagés and their traditional capital, Manresa, which had historically been the region of the Lacetani. In 885, Wilfred designated a Viscount to control the County of Ausona in his absence as it formed the frontier with the Muslim Kingdoms to the south. The "County of Manresa" received special attention from King Odo, granting it the privilege of constructing defensive towers in 889 and 890, although it was actually part of Ausona.

== Ecclesiastical reform ==
The ecclesiastic state of the region was no less isolated than its political state, with the parishes largely remaining outside of the universal hierarchy. Wilfred brought the parishes of Bergueda and Vall de Lord within the control of the nearby Diocese of Urgell. However, he had to re-establish the lapsed bishopric of Vic in Ausona. After consulting the Archbishop of Narbonne in 886, he was given permission to install Gotmar, a priest, as Bishop of Vic. The new bishop immediately set about restoring the repopulated city and its cathedral, which had been devastated and in ruins since the last Muslim conquest and the rebellion of Aissó.

The churches in the region during this period flourished gaining much power and privilege. This included the right for monks to elect their own abbots as espoused by Saint Benedict. Wilfred founded two new monasteries: Santa María de Ripoll (880) and Sant Joan de les Abadesses (885). The Abbey of Sant Joan de les Abadesses was founded in the Diocese of Vic by Wilfred and his wife Guinedilda to provide for their daughter Emma, who became the community's first abbess in 899 and was given immunity from lay jurisdiction by King Charles the Simple.

== Carolingian crisis ==
When Louis the Stammerer died in 879 after a two-year reign, the kingdom was divided between his two young sons. Louis III received the ancient northern partitions of the Merovingian kingdom, Neustria and Austrasia (including the Lorraine). His second son Carloman received the southern partitions, Burgundy and Aquitaine (including Septimania). The problems plaguing the throne were exacerbated when both Louis (882) and Carloman (884) died soon after their succession. Not wanting to crown Louis the Stammerer's remaining son, Charles the Simple, who was only five, the nobles of France looked about for a powerful man who could defend the land from the fearsome Vikings and their vicious raids on the Channel and Atlantic coasts.

At the Assembly of Ponthion (884), the Franks chose the Holy Roman Emperor Charles the Fat, who was already king of Germany and Italy. Charles, son of Louis the German, therefore became the first person since the death of Louis the Pious to reign over the entire realm of Charlemagne, his illustrious great-grandfather. He would also be the last.

Incapable of much, Charles was lethargic and probably suffered from epilepsy. In November 885, he raised a grand army to fight off the Norsemen besieging Paris, after two requests from the French nobility. However, he chose to buy the Vikings off, paying them to attack Burgundy (then in revolt) instead. He left Paris in December. He subsequently failed to deal with revolts in Swabia, Saxony, Thuringia, Franconia, and Bavaria. The nobles of the Empire deposed him in 887, and he died two months later in 888.

Charles' nephew Arnulf of Carinthia succeeded him in Germany, Berengar of Friuli succeeded him in Italy, and Odo, Count of Paris, succeeded him in France. Splinter realms also arose in Aquitaine and Burgundy. The breakdown of central royal authority and the dynastic changes broke the Holy Roman Empire and Frankish Kingdom apart. The Carolingian polity which empowered the counts at the beginning of the century was nonexistent by the end; the Counts were de facto independent—especially in the outlying regions, like the Marca Hispanica.

== The crisis and the counts ==
In the great tradition of their family, Wilfred, Miró, Dela, and Sunyer II maintained their loyalty to the Carolingian monarchs until 888 and the death of Charles the Fat. Upon the death of Louis the Stammerer, however, this loyalty became largely nominal. When Louis's sons Louis and Carloman marched against Boso, King of Provence, the counts supported them, but did not join the campaign. This was a far cry from the prompt action the family had taken against Bernard of Gothia. The Counts became more interested in issues that directly affected them and did not attend the Assembly of Ponthion dealing with the Viking problem, which they regarded as meaningless to their domains. However, they did visit the royal court in 886 to ask for privileges and precepts to be granted to Teotario (Teuter), Bishop of Girona.

The Bellonid counts rejected Charles the Fat's successor, Odo, but they also did not rise in favor of Louis the Stammerer's surviving son, Charles the Simple. In the end, Odo was too absorbed with the Norsemen and those loyal to Charles the Simple to be bothered with the far south of the realm.

In 886, a presbyter named Esclua, taking advantage of the absence of Teotardo, Archbishop of Narbonne, had himself consecrated as Bishop of Urgell and expelled the titular Bishop Ingoberto with the tacit permission of Wilfred and Raymond I, Count of Pallars-Ribagorza. Esclua complicated the situation further by declaring himself metropolitan of Tarraconensis, separating his diocese (and others) from the Archbishopric of Narbonne. Now acting as metropolitan, Esclua promptly removed Servus Dei from the Bishopric of Girona.

Servus, who was consecrated by Teotardo, but had been rejected by Dela, Sunyer, and Wilfred, took refuge in the monastery of Banyoles. Esclua, with the help of the Bishops of Barcelona and Vic, consecrated Eremir (Hermemiro) as the new Bishop of Girona. In 888, Esclua resurrected the sees of Pallars and Empuries to repay Raymond, Sunyer, and Dela for their support.

At first, Wilfred tolerated the dethronement of Ingoberto—there had been little love between them—but he could not allow the metropolitan pretensions of Esclua because of his friendship with Teotardo. The creation of independent dioceses was a method of securing political independence and Wilfred opposed this. He could not allow the lands under his control to be affected by the nobility or the Church. However, there is no indication that he took any action, possibly because of other external issues (such as the Muslim presence to his south and west).

== Death ==
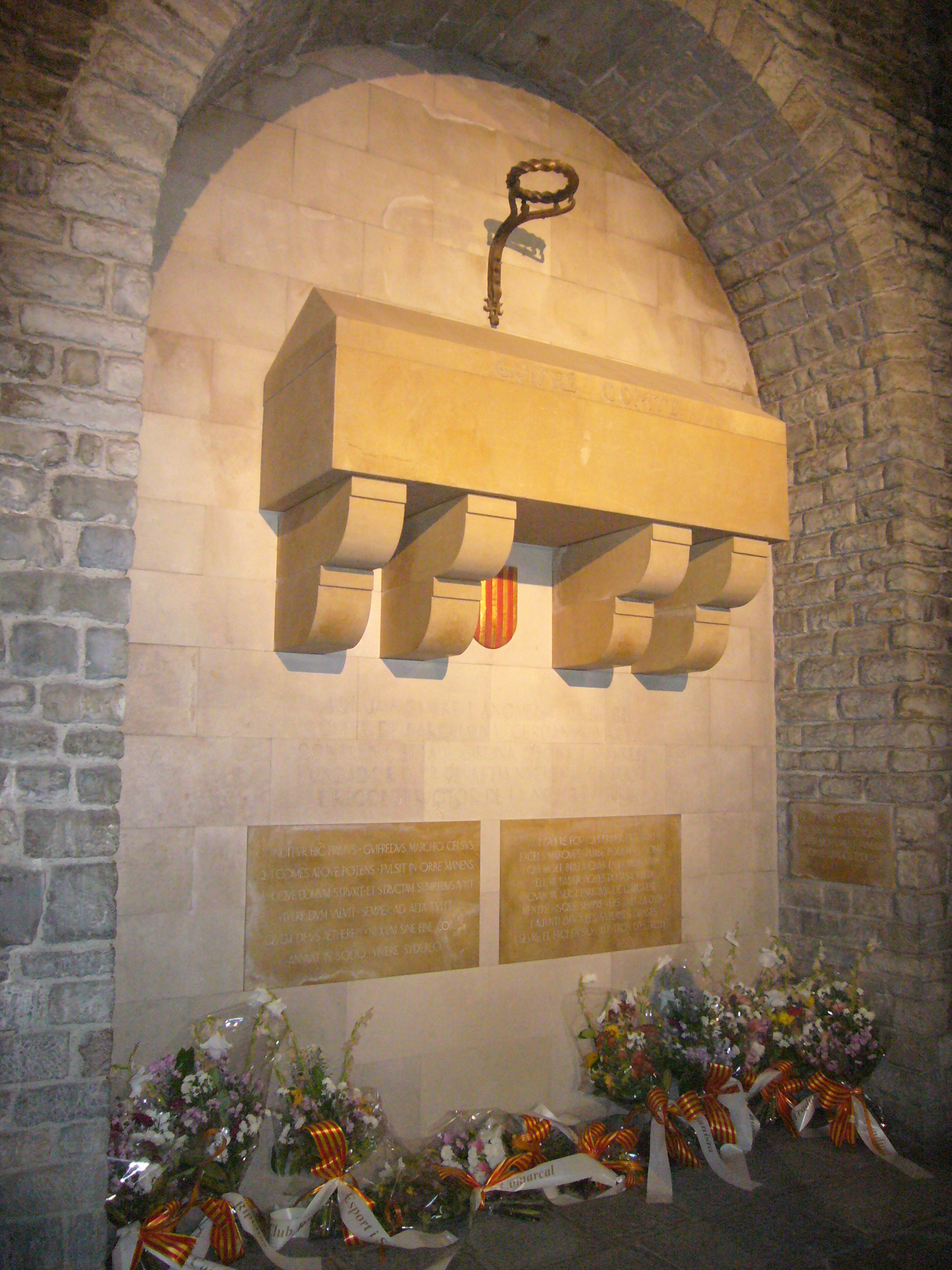
Tomb of Wilfred the Hairy in the monastery at Ripoll

By 884, the Muslims had become increasingly uneasy in regard to the expansion of the Christian counties to the north. Wilfred had established defensive positions or castles in Ausona at Cardona, Bergueda, and Vall de Lord; some were even south of the River Llobregat in the Vall de Cervelló. Essentially the frontiers of Wilfred's counties had now extended too far to remain irrelevant.

The Muslim ruler Isma'il ibn Musa ibn Qasawi fortified Lleida in response. Provoked by this, Wilfred attacked Ismail at Lleida. The attack however was a disaster. The historian Ibn al Athir describes the massacre of the attackers by the city's defenders. Buoyed by this success, Ismail's successor Lubb ibn Muhammad al-Qasawi attacked Barcelona in 897. Wilfred died in battle on 11 August 897. He was buried in the monastery at Ripoll.

== Succession ==
The weakening of Frankish royal authority in the Hispanic March is principally the result of the establishment of hereditary succession of the counties rather than by choice of the monarch. In 895, Miró the Old died and his county of Roussillon passed, without interference from King Odo, to Sunyer II of Empúries. In fact, Wilfred himself was never confirmed by any monarch as Count of Ausona. The importance of this development in the Middle Ages cannot be overstated. As hereditary succession became the custom, it became accepted as law and the kings lost control over the counts. The counts had become sovereigns in their own dominions.

The lack, however, of a legal basis for inheritance led to various experiments in hereditary succession. When Wilfred died in 897, his counties were divided amongst his sons. Wilfred Borrell and Sunyer (oldest and youngest) ruled over Barcelona, Girona, and Ausona; Miró over Cerdanya and Conflent; and Sunifred over Urgell.

== Wilfred and Catalonia ==
Wilfred the Hairy has become a figure of importance for contemporary Catalan nationalists. Nineteenth century European Romanticism looked to the medieval world for references and links to modern national and cultural identities, and in the context of Catalan nationalism and its search for its historical foundations in a distant and idealized past, Wilfred soon arose as a figure of independence, the de facto founder of the House of Barcelona, and, by purported extension, one of the forefathers of the latter Catalonia. He, however, was not Catalan nor considered himself a Catalan, as neither Catalonia nor "Catalan" counties existed at the time.

One of the legends that has arisen around his person is that of the creation of the coat of arms from which the Catalan flag (the Senyera) derives today. After being wounded in battle (some versions say against the Moors; others, the Normans), the Frankish king Charles the Bald rewarded his bravery by giving him a coat of arms. The king slid Wilfred's blood-stained fingers over the Count's copper shield, and thus was the Senyera first born, with its four pallets in Gules on Or. As much as this legend is popular and extended, there is no historical evidence to support it.

Wilfred's actions as a Frankish vassal towards carving out his own domain from several counties and moving out of the sphere of influence of the Carolingian crown—coupled with his re-creation of the County of Ausona and the restoration of the Bishopric of Vic—laid out the territorial and patrimonial base for the House of Barcelona. As such, Wilfred has retrospectively been identified with the creation of Catalonia, even though a written reference to such a territorial entity would not appear until more than two centuries later in the Liber maiolichinus de gestis Pisanorum illustribus, a 12th-century Pisan manuscript describing the raids of 1114 by Pisans and Catalans on the island of Mallorca.

== Family ==
Wilfred married Guinidilda. Charters from the period give her father as one Sunifred, who was probably a noble. The Gesta Comitum Barcinonensium records her father as Baldwin I, Margrave of Flanders, but this source is considered unreliable about this matter.

Wilfred and Guinidilda had the following issue:

- Emma, Abbess of Sant Joan de les Abadesses, d. 942
- Wilfred ΙΙ Borrell, Count of Barcelona, Girona, Ausona
- Sunifred ΙΙ, Count of Urgell
- Sunyer, succeeded Wilfred II
- Miró ΙΙ, Count of Cerdanya
- Rodolfo (also known as Radulf of Barcelona), Bishop of Urgel, Abbot of Ripoll, d. 940
- Riquilla
- Ermesinde, d. after 925
- Cixilona, a nun, d. 945
- [parentage not proven] Guinidilda; married Count Raymond II of Toulouse (d. 923)

== Appearance ==
The Gesta comitum barcinonensium reported that "...[h]e was hairy in places not normally so in men..."

== Notes ==
Preceded by Solomon I	Count of Urgell; 870–897	Succeeded by Sunifred II
Preceded by Solomon I	Count of Cerdanya; 870–897	Succeeded by Miro II
Preceded by Bernard II	Count of Barcelona; 878–897	Succeeded by Wilfred II Borrel
