= Borrell II =

Count of Barcelona, Girona and Ausona and Count of Urgell (died 993)

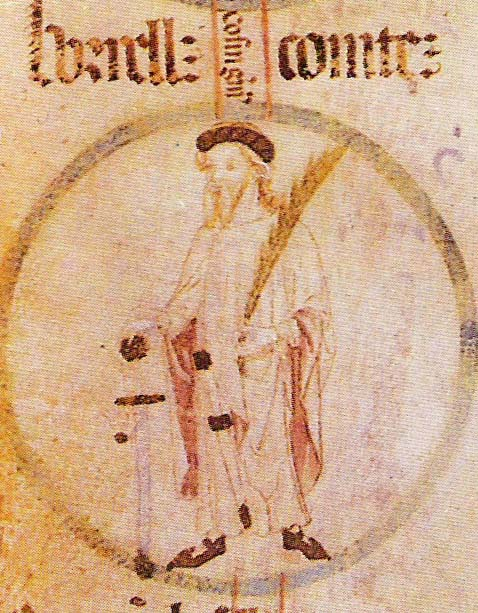
- Borel II
- Died: 993
- Noble family: House of Barcelona
- Spouses: Letgarda; Eimeruda
- Issue: Ramon Borrell, Count of Barcelona; Ermengol I, Count of Urgell; Ermengarda; Richilda
- Father: Sunyer, Count of Barcelona
- Mother: Richilda of Toulouse

Borrell II (died 993) was the count of Barcelona, Girona and Ausona from 945 and count of Urgell from 948.

Borrell was first seen acting as count during the reign of his father Sunyer II in 945 at the consecration of the nunnery church of Sant Pere de les Puelles in Barcelona. In 947, Sunyer retired to monastic life and ceded the government of his realms jointly to his sons Borrell and Miro I. In 948, Borrell inherited Urgell from his uncle Sunifred II. Sunyer died in 950, and Miro died in 966, leaving Borrell sole ruler of more than half of Old Catalonia, a status which led outsiders and flatterers to refer to him as dux Gothiae, "Duke of Gothia". His own documents almost all refer to him merely as comes et marchio, "Count and Marquis".

== History ==
Borrell was the son of Sunyer. In 967 he married Letgarda, who is speculated to have been daughter of a Count of Toulouse or Rouergue based on the names given to her children. By her Borrell had two sons and two daughters: Ramon Borrell (972–1017), Ermengol (974–1010), Ermengarda and Richilda. After Letgarda's death circa 986, he married Eimeruda, perhaps of Auvergne in 987.

Borrell's military career seems to have been undistinguished—he is recorded as fighting only two battles and seems to have lost both—and it was under his rule that Barcelona was sacked in 985 by the Muslim leader Almanzor. On the other hand, he had far greater success as a diplomat. Before the attacks of the 980s, and discounting a single raid by the Caliph al-Hakam II soon after his succession in 961, he maintained cordial relations with the Muslim rulers of Córdoba and also sent emissaries to the kings of the Franks. Furthermore, in 970, he voyaged to Rome to meet with both Pope John XIII and Emperor Otto I.

Borrell was also a patron of learning and culture. In 967, Borrell visited the monastery of Aurillac and the Abbot asked the count to take Gerbert of Aurillac (the future Pope Sylvester II) with him so that the boy could study mathematics in Spain. In the following years, Gerbert studied under the direction of Bishop Atto of Vic, some 60 km north of Barcelona, and probably also at the nearby monastery of Santa Maria de Ripoll. He was also taken on the 970 embassy to Rome, during which the Pope persuaded Otto to employ Gerbert as a tutor for his young son, the future emperor Otto II.

In 985 the Hispanic March was attacked by the Muslim general Almanzor. Borrell tried to stop him but was defeated and Almanzor was able to take Barcelona, which was pillaged and sacked. Many citizens were taken prisoner by the Muslim forces. Borrell sent a request for help to King Lothar III, the current King of the Western Franks, but although documents of Borrell's refer to royal orders that must have come from this embassy, actual military assistance was beyond Lothar's power. What appears to have been a similar plea to Hugh Capet resulted in a letter from Hugh to Borrell promising aid if the count preferred "to obey us rather than the Ishmaelites", but in any event Hugh could not persuade his nobles to support a southern expedition. No answer to Hugh's letter is known from Borrell, and the connection between the March and France was effectively broken. Nationalist Catalan historians consider this the point at which "Catalonia" became a sovereign power, and the millennium of their independence was celebrated in 1987 with conferences and numerous publications; but it appears that other "Catalan" counties, other than Borrell's, retained links with the Frankish crown for a little longer.

From 988, Borrell's sons Ramon Borrell and Ermengol appear as rulers in a divided territory, with Ramon Borrell being count of Barcelona, Girona, and Osona and Ermengol being count of Urgell. Borrell II continued to issue documents and tour his domains, however, and when he was taken ill in 993 in Castellciutat near la Seu d'Urgell, the will that he made provided for him outliving his executors. It was not to be, however, and his death followed soon afterwards.

== Notes ==
Preceded by Sunyer	Count of Barcelona; 947–993 with Miro I (947–966)	Succeeded by Ramon Borrell
