= Sack of Barcelona (985) =

Siege and Sack of Barcelona (985)
- Part of Reconquista
- Almanzor campaigns
Date	1–6 July
Location	Barcelona
Result	Córdoban victory

Belligerents
Caliphate of Córdoba	County of Barcelona

Commanders and leaders
Almanzor	Borrell II, Count of Barcelona

Casualties and losses
Unknown	Entire garrison slain †; 70,000 enslaved (surrendered) (exaggeration)

In the year 985, the Córdoban general Almanzor launched a military campaign against the County of Barcelona, which culminated in the sacking and razing of Barcelona.

== Raid ==
In May 985, the Córdoban general, Almanzor, left Córdoba with his army and marched towards the County of Barcelona. The army was accompanied by a fleet departing from Cartagena. Almanzor entered the lands of the county. The Count, Borrell II, learned of the upcoming raid and decided to confront the Muslims. Both armies met Moncada in late June, and the Córdoban army successfully routed the Catalans and killed 500 of their troops. Borrel escaped from the battlefield and headed towards Barcelona. Almanzor arrived in the city on July 1 and besieged the city from land and sea. Almanzor began bombarding it with catapults. The Catalan defenders resisted bravely, but most of the garrison was inexperienced, as the majority of the army was killed in Moncada. Borrel escaped the city at night by sea.

The city fell on July 6, and the Córdobans began sacking the city; the entire garrison was slain, and the inhabitants were either killed or enslaved. One account reports that 70,000 were enslaved, but this number is an exaggeration. Almanzor did not attempt to keep the city, as his objective was to weaken the Christian power in the east of Iberia.

== Sources ==
- Muhammad Abdullah Enan, The State of Islam in Andalusia, Vol. I: The 'Amarite state.
- Carlos Dominguez, Leader of the Jihad: Almanzor against the Christian Kingdoms.
- Simon Barton, Conquerors, Brides, and Concubines, Interfaith Relations and Social Power in Medieval Iberia.
