= Miro of Barcelona =

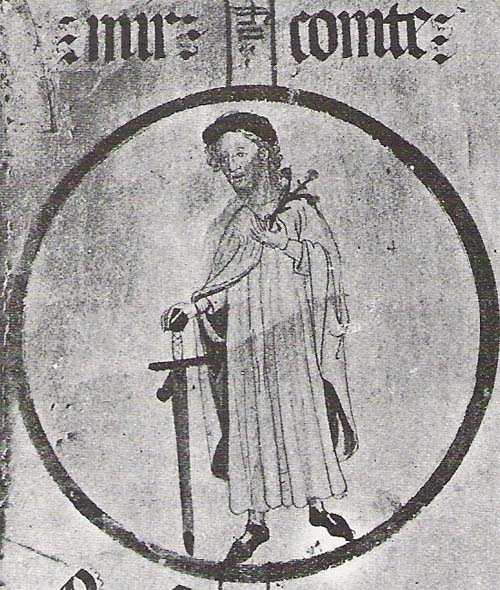

Miro (died Barcelona, 966) was count of Barcelona, Gerona and Osona from 947 to 966. He was the son of Sunyer, Count of Barcelona and his second wife, Riquilda.

When his father stood down in 947 he became governor jointly with his brother Borrell II of Barcelona. Borrell took charge of military and foreign affairs and Miro took charge of domestic affairs.

Miro made donations to the monasteries of San Cugat del Vallès, Sant Joan de las Abadeses i Ripoll, and during his reign it is believed that he began construction of the Rec Comtal, which took water to Barcelona.

== See also ==
- Count of Barcelona
- Catalan counties
