= Lupitus of Barcelona =

Spanish astronomer

Lupitus of Barcelona, identified with a Christian archdeacon called Sunifred, was an astronomer in late 10th century Barcelona, then part of the Marca Hispanica, the borderland of Christian France fronting Islamic al-Andalus.

Lupitus was instrumental in the transfer of Arabic mathematics, including the astrolabe and the Hindu–Arabic numeral system to Christian Europe. Gerbert of Aurillac in a letter of 984 asks Lupitus for a translation of an Arabic astronomical treatise, the Sententiae astrolabii.

== See also ==
- Barcelona astrolabe
