= Sunifred II of Urgell =

Count of Urgell (c. 898–948)

Sunifred II (c. 898–948) was Count of Urgell (then part of West Francia). He was the son of Wilfred the Hairy of Urgell and succeeded his father on the latter's death in 897. He was still ruling as late as 940, when he appears with his wife Adelaide.

Preceded by Wilfred I	Count of Urgell; 897–948	Succeeded by Borrell II
