= Santa Maria de Ripoll =

Benedictine monastery in Catalonia

Coordinates: 42°12′5.51″N 2°11′26.69″E

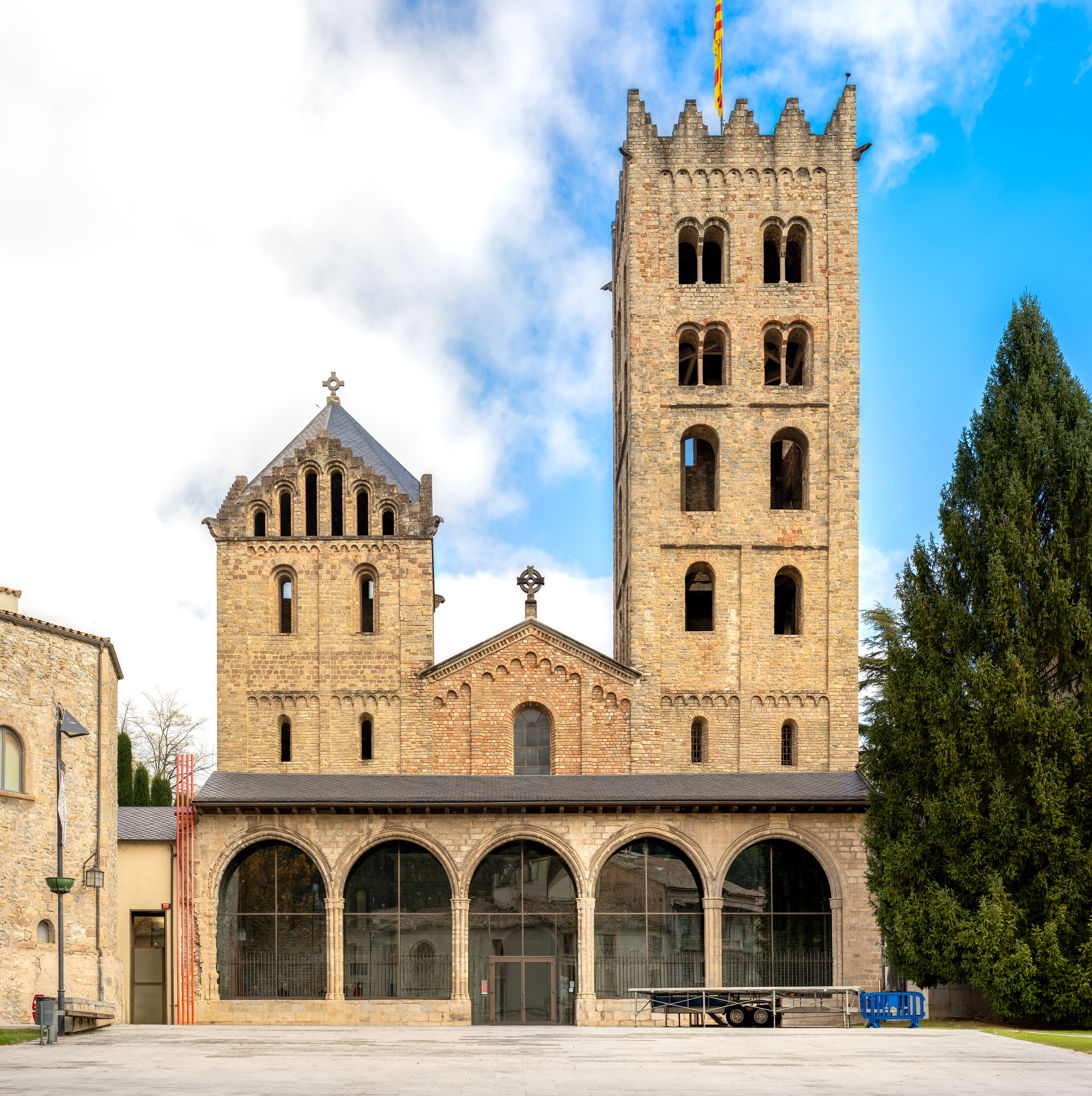
Façade of the monastery.

The Monastery of Santa Maria de Ripoll is a Benedictine monastery, built in the Romanesque style, located in the town of Ripoll in Catalonia, Spain. Although much of the present church is 19th century rebuilding, the sculptured portico is a renowned work of Romanesque art.

== History ==
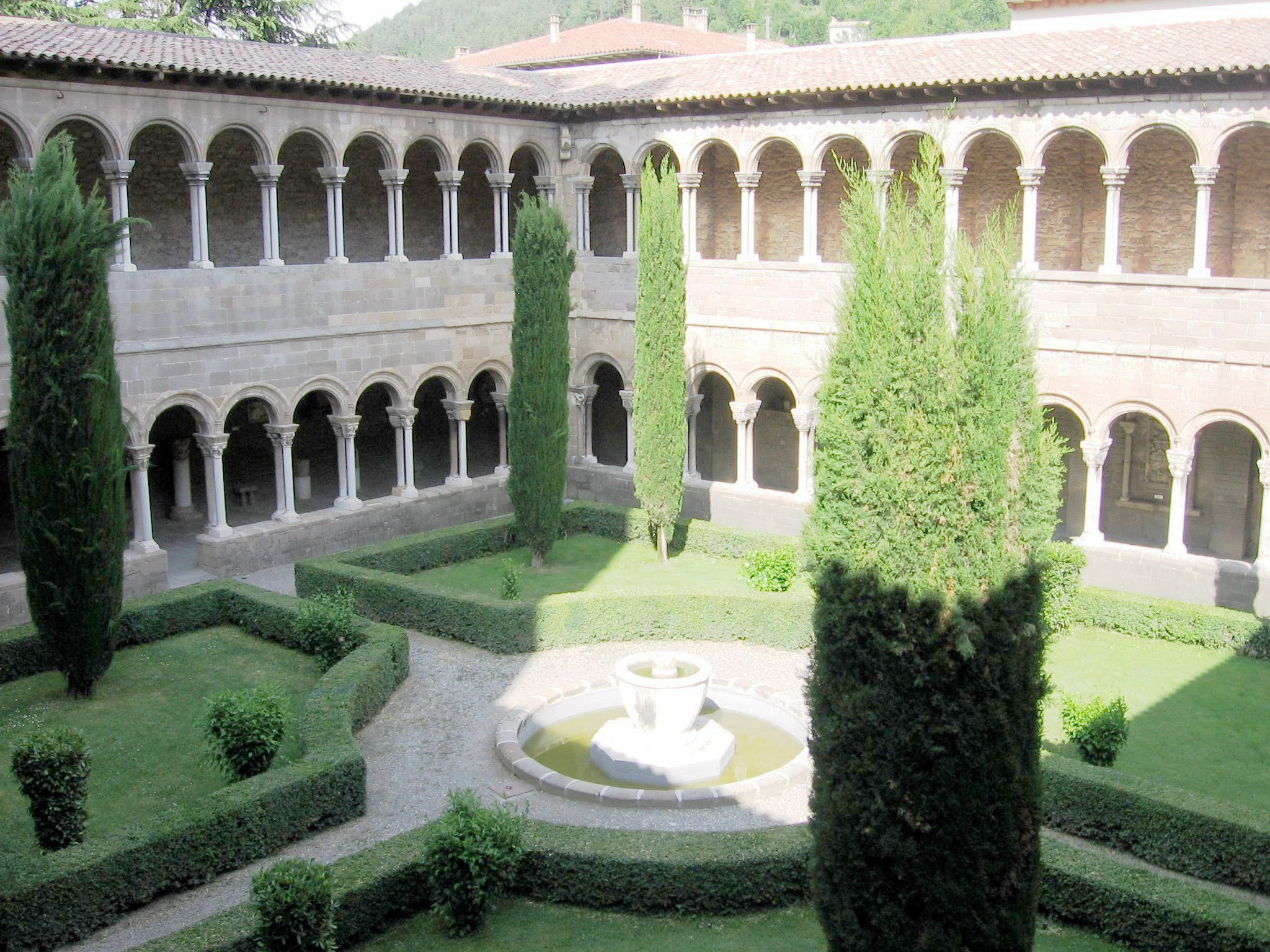
The cloister.

The Monastery of Santa María de Ripoll was founded in 888 by Count Wilfred the Hairy (called Guifré el Pilós in Catalan) who used it as a centre to bring about the repopulation of the region after conquering it. Wilfred's son, Ridulph, was educated there and was later abbot of the monastery, as well as bishop of Urgell. The monastery grew rapidly, and was subsequently reconsecrated in 935, 977 and 1032, though the monks are known to have been established there permanently only from 1025 or 1032. The scriptorium and the monastic school quickly gained renown under Arnold Scholasticus. The monastery had several offshoots which included the abbeys of St. Martin-du-Canigou (now in France) and that of Santa Maria de Montserrat. It was also known for its collection of manuscripts which numbered 246 by the year 1046, and later included the Gesta comitum Barcinonensium, considered to be the first history of Catalonia and written by the monks themselves.

From 1070 to 1169 the monastery was governed by the Abbey of St. Victor of Marseille. Santa Maria de Ripoll was the main religious centre of Catalonia until the 15th century, when it started to decline, beginning with the loss of control over the Monastery of Montserrat in 1402. In 1428 it was severely damaged by an earthquake, after which it was restored with the new parts in Gothic style.

The monastery became the family mausoleum for the Counts of Barcelona and Counts of Besalú, and well as a great centre of learning, with a large library.

The library and much of the monastery's vast archives were destroyed by fire in 1835, after it had been secularised. In 1847 part of the cloister was demolished, followed in 1856 by the abbey palace. It was rebuilt in 1886, under the direction of architect Elias Rogent, the basilica being consecrated in 1896.

== Architecture ==
The original monastic church had a nave and four aisles, roofed by barrel vaults. The nave and aisle terminated in five apses, later increased to seven when apses were added to the transepts also. The current church dates to Rogent's reconstruction in 1896, and although maintaining features of the original church, the present building has only two aisles. The transept houses the tombs of the counts of Besalú and of several counts of Barcelona, from Wilfred the Hairy to Ramón Berenguer IV.

The cloister contains more of the original structure than the church itself, the first floor having been built between 1180 and the early 15th century. The second floor dates to the 15th and 16th century. It is formed, on each side, by thirteen semicircular arches supported by small pairs of columns with carved Corinthian-like capitals, sculpted by Pere Gregori and Jordi de Déu. Each one of the latter has a different decoration, inspired by mythological themes or by daily life.

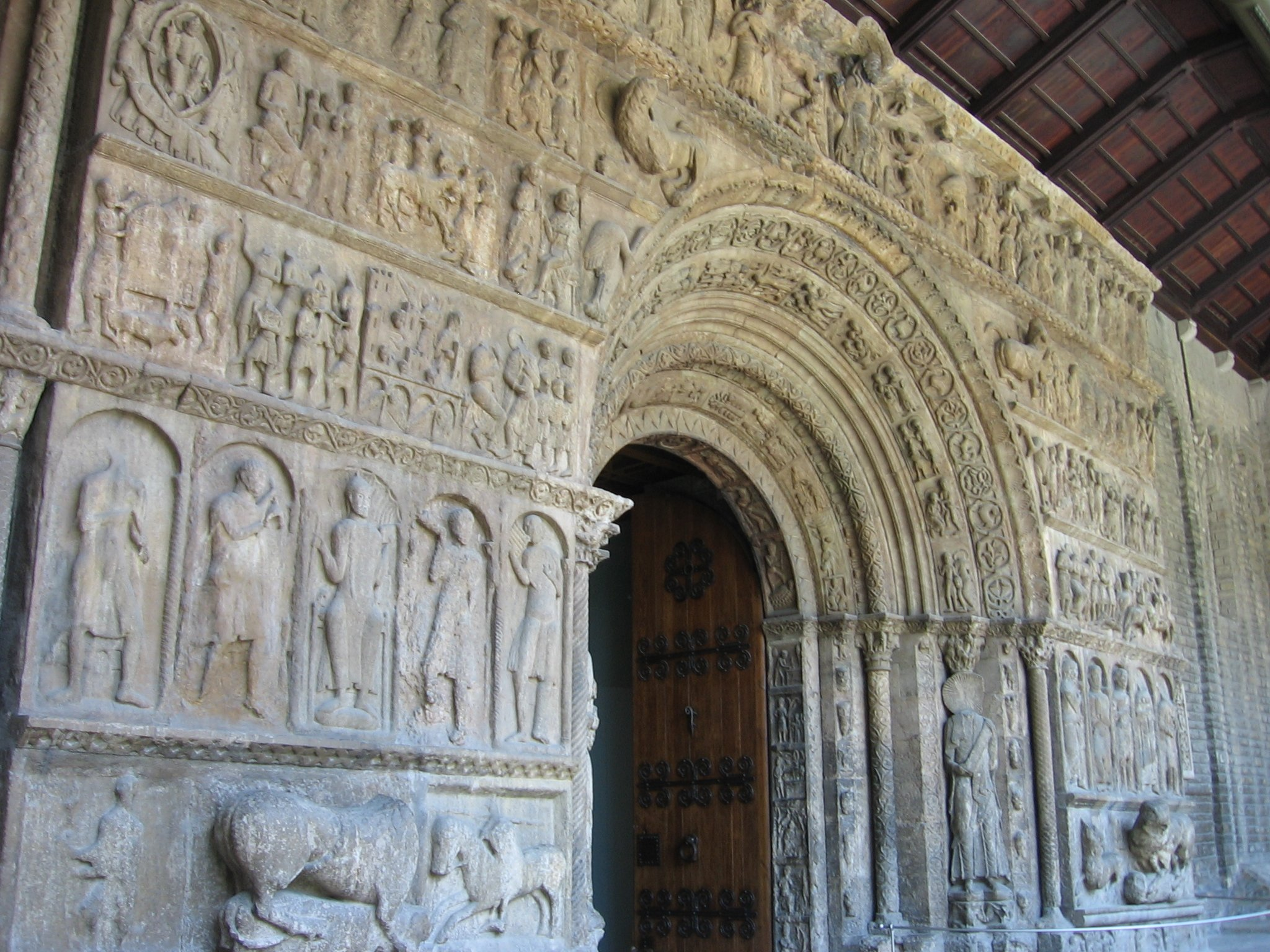
Portal.

The portal, although damaged by fires and restored in modern times, is a notable example of Catalan Romanesque sculpture. The frontal section features a relief from the mid-12th century (stylistically similar to the tomb of Ramón Berenguer III in the cloister), divided in seven horizontal bands. The upper two show God enthroned, near whom are the symbols of the Four Evangelists; the scene is completed by several angels in adoration and the Twenty-four Elders. The central bands are dedicated to the story of David and Solomon (left) and Moses (right). At the bottom are various mythical animals commonly identified with the visions of the prophet Daniel.

The portico is flanked by two statues, nearly destroyed, of St. Peter and St. Paul. Around them are various scenes, including the stories of Cain and Abel, that of Jonah and others.

== Scriptorium ==
Santa Maria de Ripoll was an important cultural center, partly thanks to its collection of manuscripts. In the year 925, it is recorded that the monastery received, among other goods, a donation of books from Count Sunyer I of Barcelona and his wife Riquilda of Toulouse. During the time of Abbot Arnulf, numerous copies were made, most of which were translations of Arabic works on mathematics or astronomy. These connections with Arabic culture were strengthened during the reign of Al-Hakam II, when embassies of palatine and religious dignitaries from Barcelona visited Córdoba. It is likely that some of the manuscripts used at Ripoll originated from there. In 979, the monastery had 69 volumes; by 1008, it already had 121, and this number grew to 246 by the death of Abbot Oliba in 1046. Most of these manuscripts were copied and reproduced in the monastery’s own scriptorium.

Abbot Oliba was one of the main figures behind the expansion of the monastery’s library, acquiring 71 new manuscripts and encouraging new works produced within the monastery itself. To prevent them from being stolen, he decreed that anyone who committed such a theft would be punished with excommunication.

The Chronicles of Ripoll (Chronicones Rivipullenses) are a set of chronicles whose beginning is dated shortly after the fourth dedication of the monastery’s church (1032) and is probably due to the initiative of Abbot Oliba.

- Cronicó Rivipullense I
- Alterum Rotense
- Cronicó Dertusense II
- Chronicon Benifassani
- Cronicó Rivipullense II

During his tenure, the most valuable collection was created: a series of three great Bibles. These include the so-called Fluvià Bible, which was lost in the fire that destroyed the monastery in 1835; the Roda Bible (1010–1015), named because it was once kept at the monastery of Sant Pere de Rodes, having been gifted by the Abbot of Ripoll. It was plundered and taken to France as a war trophy in 1693 by Marshal Noailles. Carolingian and Byzantine in style, it consists of four volumes—two decorated with colored miniatures and two in black and white—and is now housed at the National Library of Paris; and the Ripoll Bible (1015–1020), also known as the "Farfa Bible" because it was initially believed to have been created at the Abbey of Farfa, which today is preserved at the Vatican Library.

From Abbot Oliba’s time, the names of several illustrators and calligraphers are known, such as the monk Oliva, who produced a calendar and an abacus and measurements chart, as well as Garcías, Arnald, and Guifré.

In the twelfth century, monks at Ripoll were responsible for the copying (and likely the creation) of a number of other important literary and historical texts. A compilation manuscript now in Paris at the National Library of France contains a fragment of a chronicle of the First Crusade by Raymond of Aguilers, a liturgy relating to the conquest of Jerusalem by the crusaders in 1099, the earliest version of the dynastic history of the counts of Barcelona, Gesta comitum Barcinonensium, the earliest literary work dedicated to El Cid (Carmen Campi Doctoris), and a song (with music) composed for Count Raymond Berengar IV of Barcelona. Although not all of the materials were originally part of the same manuscript, these different works were all apparently composed or copied at Ripoll.

== Notable interments ==
- Wilfred the Hairy
- Ramon Berenguer III, Count of Barcelona
- Ramon Berenguer IV, Count of Barcelona
- Bernat Tallaferro, Count of Besalú
- Radulf, Abbot of Ripoll, son of Wilfred the Hairy

Also buried at the abbey, but in a now-unknown place:

- Sunifred II, Count of Barcelona, also known as Sunyer, Count of Barcelona
- Miro I, Count of Barcelona
- Berenguer Ramon I, Count of Barcelona

== See also ==
- Romanesque architecture
- Romanesque art
- List of regional characteristics of Romanesque churches
- Santiago de Compostela Cathedral
- High medieval domes
