= Military history of Catalonia =

Military history of Catalonia, now part of Spain

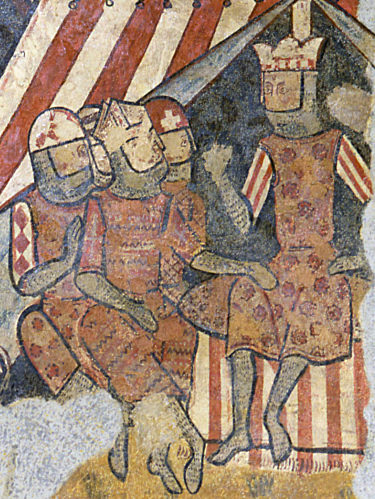
King James I of Aragon with the bishop of Barcelona Berenguer de Palou and the magnates Bernat de Centelles and Gilabert de Cruïlles during the conquest of Majorca (1229) (frescoes from Aguilar de Barcelona Palace. MNAC)

The military history of Catalonia began in the thirteenth century, with the first exploits of the armies under the orders of Catalan rulers and lasting until today, where Catalan soldiers are integrated into international forces.

== Origins ==
Diachronic map of the Crown of Aragon

The origins of military force in the Catalonia date back to the thirteenth century, with the Sagramental, the brotherhood among several peoples to guarantee their own security, made by oath, and, therefore, called this way. Though they were institutionalised during the reign of James I, they had already been legislated in writing during the 11th century. In Catalonia, the usage Princeps namque established the requirement that every man participate in the national defense in the event of external threat.

The history of the Mediterranean has often tasted Catalan weapons, from Murcia to Athens and Neopatria (Great Catalan Company), but also to old Catalonia, before and after the Nueva Planta decrees (1716).

The Catalans, Aragonese and Valencians have been organized spontaneously militarily in many different ways, from the Sagramental, the Crusades of the Almogavars to the maulets, the submissive ones, or the maquis. Until the Nueva Planta decrees, in Catalan homes there were always weapons and ammunition to defend themselves, either from the Saracens, the pirates or the French.

It is not therefore until after the defeat of the War of the Spanish Succession that the new Bourbon authorities limited and controlled the right to bear arms, and under the pretext of pacifying the country, it hides the desire to prevent citizens from rising in Weapons against it, as had happened many times.

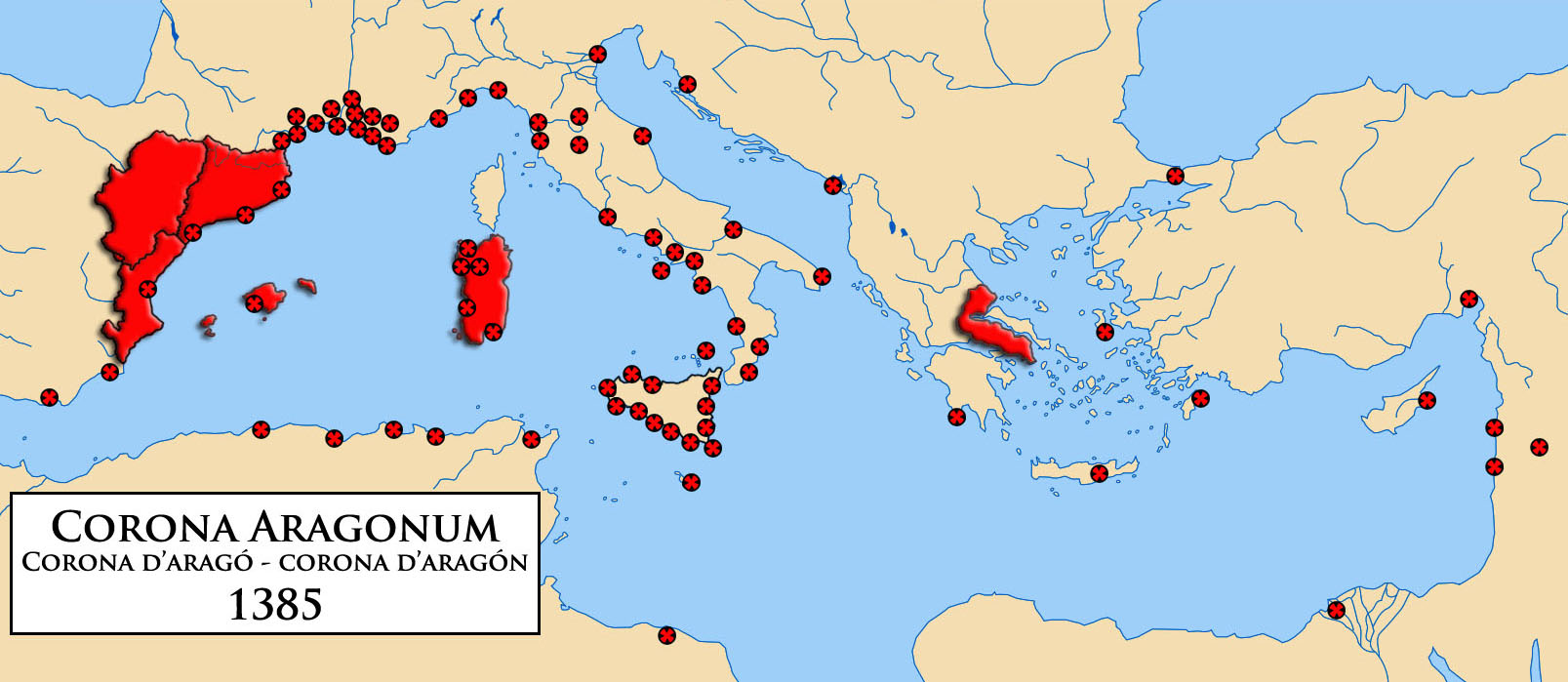
Areas belonging to the Aragonian crown in 1385, including the various naval consulates (combination of fact and commercial courts) that were then established in port cities around the Mediterranean.

Map of Catalonia entitled Cataloniae principatus novissima et accurata descriptio printed in Antwerp in 1608 or 1612 by Jan Baptist Vrients.

In addition, the Catalan constitutions, abolished in fact by the Decree, forced the Crown to negotiate the popular support, represented by the arm seal (an institution that convened the Provincial Council of the General in an extraordinary way in cases of emergency or urgency) of the catalan courts, support that they often granted in exchange for privileges, which limited the royal authority. This balance of powers disappears after the defeat, and humiliation becomes apparent in many ways, such as the demolition of La Ribera quarter, where there was more resistance, the construction of the fortress of the Ciutadella in the same place, the imposition of the Cadastre, or the closure of all Catalan universities.

For this reason, when they saw the difference of the concept of royal authority in Castile, the Catalans rose up with Charles VI, Holy Roman Emperor, handed out posters of propaganda and negotiated with England.

The Abandonment of the Allies of Catalonia in the war of Spanish succession "Treaty of utrecht" supposed the Victory of the Bourbon monarchy Support with Castille versus Habsburg Support with Aragon Crown: (Principality Of Catalonia, The Kingdom of Aragon, Kingdom of Valencia and Kingdom of Mallorca) that Centralized power and eliminated rights and freedoms of the nations surrounding the Castille Nation with New Plant Decree.

The deplorable History of The catalans written by Queen Anne of England or The case of the catalans document of several European foreign ministries reflect that abandonment.

The Crown of Aragon has been considered an empire which ruled in the Mediterranean for hundreds of years, with the power to set rules over the entire sea(for instance, the Llibre del Consolat del Mar or Book of the Consulate of the Sea, written in Catalan, is one of the oldest compilation of maritime laws in the world). It was indeed, at its height, one of the major powers in Europe.

== Navy ==
Catalan navy

== Military Objects and Constructions ==
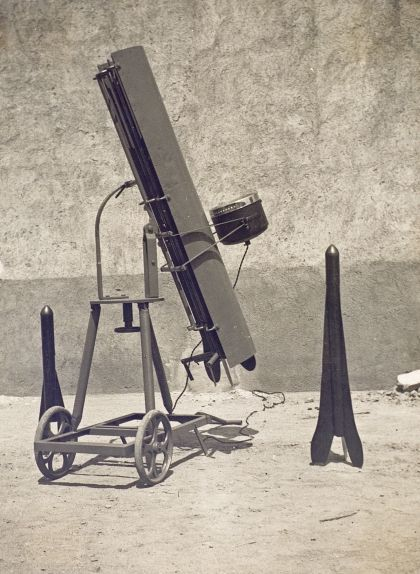
Belmonte Aerial Torpedo

=== Anti-aircraft missile test ===
Belmonte Aerial Torpedo 1937

=== Bombarda ===
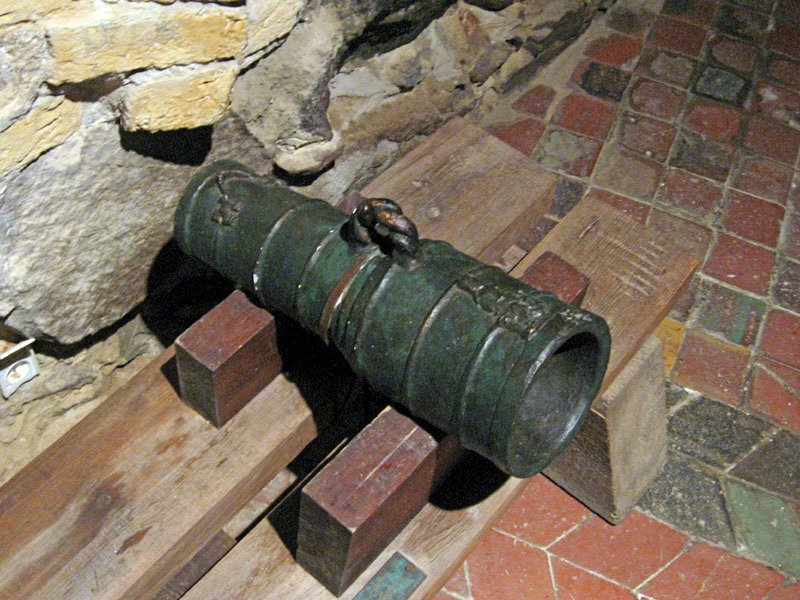
Bombarda

« ...e la nostra nau desparà una bombarda e ferí en lo castell de la nau de Castella... »

— Cròniques dels reis d'Aragó e comtes de Barcelona

== Guns and Arms ==
Pistols:

- Pistol isard
- Pistol F. Ascaso

Submachine guns:

- Submachine Labora-fontbernat

Assault rifles:

Shotguns:

Sniper rifles:

Heavy weapons:

- Hispano Suiza Hs.404

Armoured Vehicles

- AAC-1937 also known Chevrolet 1937

== Reaper's War ==
- Battle of Montjuïc

== War of the Spanish Succession ==
- Army of the Principality of Catalonia

== Spanish Civil War ==
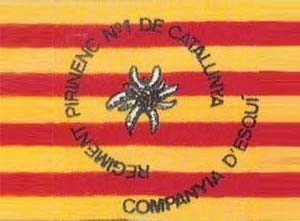
Flag of the Ski Company of the Regiment

- People's Army of Catalonia
  - Regiment Pirinenc Núm. 1

== See also ==
- Ictineo II
- Catalan Navy
- Great Catalan Company
- Portal: Military History of Catalonia Military Portal Catalonia in English: https://ja.cat/07yXi
