= Principality of Catalonia =

State in Iberia (1173–1714)

Coordinates: 41°22′58″N 02°10′36″E

Principality of Catalonia Principat de Catalunya (Catalan) Principatus Cathaloniae (Latin)
- 1173–1714
- Flag Coat of arms (Note: Exclusively the royal arms until the late 14th c., when it began to be territorialized)

- Location of the Principality of Catalonia (red) within the Iberian realms of the Crown of Aragon (white)

- Location of the Principality of Catalonia (light green, at the left) in a diachronic map of the Mediterranean dominions of the Crown of Aragon
- Status: State of the Crown of Aragon (1173–1640, 1652–1714); State of the Monarchy of Spain (1516–1640, 1652–1714); In personal union with the Kingdom of France (1641–1652)
- Capital: Barcelona
- Common languages: Catalan (Note: Administrative, cultural and common language.); Occitan (Note: Cultural until the 15th century and common language of the Aran Valley.); Medieval Latin (Note: Widely used for administrative and liturgical purposes.); Andalusi Arabic (until the 14th c.) (Note: In the south-west among the local Andalusi Muslim population.); Castilian (since the 16th c.) (Note: By the royal administration, as well as among the nobility and the cultured segments of the middle class due to diglossia. Sole official language after 1716.)
- Religion: Catholicism (official); Judaism (minority, until 1492) Sunni Islam (minority, until 1526)
- Demonym: Catalan(s)
- Government: Monarchy subject to constitutions
- Prince
  - 1173–1196: Alfons I (first)
  - 1705–1714: Charles III (last)
- President of the Generalitat
  - 1359–1362: Berenguer de Cruïlles (first)
  - 1713–1714: Josep de Vilamala (last)
- Legislature: General Court of Catalonia
- Historical era: Medieval; Early modern
  - Legal definition of Catalonia: 1173
  - First Catalan Courts: 1214
  - Generalitat: 1359
  - Habsburg Spain: 1516
  - Treaty of the Pyrenees: 1659
  - Siege of Barcelona: 11 September 1714

Population
  - 1700: c. 500,000
- Currency: Diner de tern, Croat, Principat, Florin, others
Preceded by
County of Barcelona
Almoravid dynasty
County of Pallars Jussà
County of Empúries
County of Urgell
County of Pallars Sobirà
Succeeded by
1659: French Roussillon
1714: Kingdom of Spain
Andorra
- Today part of: Andorra; France; Spain; ∟ Catalonia

The Principality of Catalonia (Note: Catalan: Principat de Catalunya; Occitan: Principat de Catalonha; Spanish: Principado de Cataluña; Latin: Principatus Cathaloniæ) was a medieval and early modern state in the northeastern Iberian Peninsula. For most of its existence it was in personal union with the Kingdom of Aragon and other states, constituting together the composite monarchy known as the Crown of Aragon. It was bordered by the Kingdom of Aragon to the west, the Kingdom of Valencia to the south, the Kingdom of France to the north and by the Mediterranean Sea to the east. Its sovereign or prince had the title of Count of Barcelona. Established in the second half of the 12th century as a result of the territorial, legislative and institutional evolution of the County of Barcelona, it ceased to exist as an independent political entity after the pro-Habsburg defeat of 1714 in the War of the Spanish Succession and the subsequent suppression of the Catalan institutional system by the Nueva Planta Decree of 1716. However, it remained as a territorial division until 1833. Today, the term Principat ("Principality") is used primarily to refer to the autonomous community of Catalonia in Spain, as distinct from the other Catalan Countries.

The first reference to Catalonia and the Catalans appears in the Liber maiolichinus, a Pisan chronicle (1117-1125) of the conquest of Majorca by a joint force of Northern Italians, Catalans, and Occitans. At the time, Catalonia did not yet exist as a political entity, though the use of this term acknowledge Catalonia as a cultural or geographical entity. The counties that eventually made up the Principality of Catalonia were gradually unified under the rule of the count of Barcelona. In 1137, the County of Barcelona and the Kingdom of Aragon formed a dynastic union, later known as the Crown of Aragon; however, Aragon and Catalonia retained their own political structure and legal systems, developing separate political communities along the next centuries. Under Alfons I the Troubador (1162–1196), Catalonia was regarded as a political entity for the first time in 1173, while the term Principality of Catalonia was fully formalized in 1343.

Its institutional system evolved over the centuries, establishing political bodies analogous to the ones of the other kingdoms of the Crown (such as the Courts, the Generalitat or the Consell de Cent) and legislation (Constitutions and Usatges) which largely limited the royal power and secured the political model of pactism (contractual system between the monarch and the Estates). Catalonia contributed to further develop the Crown trade and military, most significantly their navy. The Catalan language flourished and expanded as more territories were added to the Crown, including Valencia, the Balearic Islands, Sardinia, Sicily, Naples, and Athens. In the 15th century, the end of the rule of House of Barcelona (1410), serf and urban conflicts and a civil war (1462–1472) weakened the role of the Principality within the Crown and at international affairs.

In 1516, Charles V became monarch of both the crowns of Aragon and Castile, creating a personal union, the Monarchy of Spain. In 1492 the Spanish colonization of the Americas began, and political power began to shift away towards Castile. Tensions between Catalan institutions and the monarchy, alongside the peasants' revolts, provoked the Reapers' War (1640–1659), who saw the brief establishment of a Catalan Republic. By the Treaty of the Pyrenees (1659) the Roussillon was ceded to France. During the War of the Spanish Succession (1701–1714), the Crown of Aragon supported the Archduke Charles of Habsburg. After the surrender of Barcelona in 1714, King Philip V of Bourbon, inspired by the French model, imposed absolutism and a unifying administration across Spain, and enacted the Nueva Planta decrees for every realm of the Crown of Aragon, which suppressed Catalan, Aragonese, Valencian and Majorcan institutions and legal systems and merged them into the Crown of Castile as provinces, ending their status as states.

== History ==
=== Origins ===
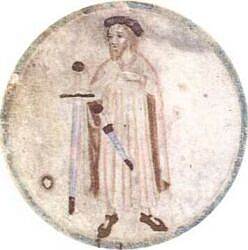
Wilfred the Hairy, depicted in the Genealogy of the Kings of Aragon, c. 1400

The Visigoths ruled after the Western Roman Empire's collapse near the end of the 5th century. Moorish Al-Andalus gained control in the early 8th century, after conquering the Visigothic kingdom in 711–718. After the defeat of Abd al-Rahman ibn Abd Allah al-Ghafiqi's troops at Tours in 732, the Franks gradually gained control of the former Visigoth territories north of the Pyrenees, which had been captured by the Muslims, in what is today Languedoc and Northern Catalonia. In 795, Charlemagne created what came to be known by historiography and some Frankish chronicles as the Marca Hispanica, a buffer zone beyond the province of Septimania, made up of locally administered counties (designated under the collective name of Catalan counties in modern times) which served as a defensive barrier between the Umayyad of Al-Andalus and the Frankish Kingdom.

A distinctive Catalan culture started to develop in that period stemming from these small counties throughout the northernmost part of current Catalonia. The counts of Barcelona were Frankish vassals nominated by the Carolingian emperor, then the king of the Franks, to whom they were feudatories (801–988). In 878, Wilfred the Hairy, an ethnic Visigoth from Carcassona, count of Urgell and Cerdanya, was appointed count of Barcelona, Girona and Osona. Since then, Girona and Osona were subsumed and, over time, integrated into Barcelona, becoming the political core of the future Principality of Catalonia. Upon his death in 897 Wilfred made his titles hereditaries and thus founded the House of Barcelona, which would rule over Catalonia until the death of Martin I, its last ruling member, in 1410. Many abbeys were founded between the ninth century and the twelfth century while in the cities the episcopal seats were restored, being important artistic and intellectual centers which contribute to an important diffusion of the Romanesque art in Catalonia (monasteries of Santa Maria de Ripoll and Montserrat, collegiate church of Cardona, cathedral of Girona...) as well as to the maintenance of rich libraries nourished by Classical, Visigothic and Arab works. The scholar and mathematician Gerbert d'Aurillac (future pope Sylvester II) studied in Vic and Ripoll and knowledge of mathematics and astronomy were introduced from Arabic.

The County of Barcelona (in blue-grey) at the death of Ramon Berenguer III (1131)

In 988 Count Borrell II did not recognise the Frankish king Hugh Capet and his new dynasty, effectively taking Barcelona out of Frankish rule. From that point on, the counts of Barcelona sometimes referred to themselves as princeps (prince), in order to show their pre-eminence and sovereignty. During the 9th and 10th centuries, the counties increasingly became a society of aloers, peasant proprietors of small, family-based farms, who lived by subsistence agriculture and owed no formal feudal allegiance. At the start of the 11th century the Catalan Counties suffer an important process of feudalization, as the miles formed links of vassalage over this previously independent peasantry. The middle years of the century were characterized by virulent class warfare. Seigniorial violence was unleashed against the peasants, utilizing new military tactics, based on contracting well armed mercenary soldiers mounted on horses. By the end of the century, most of the aloers had been converted into serfs. Under the reign of countess Ermesinde of Carcassonne (1017–1057), which received the government of Barcelona after the death of her husband the count Ramon Borrell, the disintegration of central power became evident.

The response of the Catholic Church to the feudal violence was the establishment of the sagreres (the immediate area surrounding the churches, considered sacred and free from violence) and the movement of Peace and Truce of God. The first assembly of Peace and Truce was presided by Abbot Oliba in Toulouges, Roussillon in 1027. The grandson of Ermesinde, count Ramon Berenguer I, began the codification of Catalan law in the written Usages of Barcelona which was to become the first full compilation of feudal law in Western Europe. Legal codification was part of the count's efforts to forward and somehow control the process of feudalization.

Under count Ramon Berenguer III, the County of Barcelona experienced a new phase of territorial expansion. This included the incorporation of the counties of Besalú and Cerdanya, a joint Catalan-Pisan Crusade against the Taifa of Majorca (1114) and the conquest of Tarragona (1116), restoring in the last one the archiepiscopal see of the city (1119), which was previously disbanded after the Muslim conquest. That meant the independence of the Catalan Church from the bishopric of Narbonne.

=== Dynastic union ===
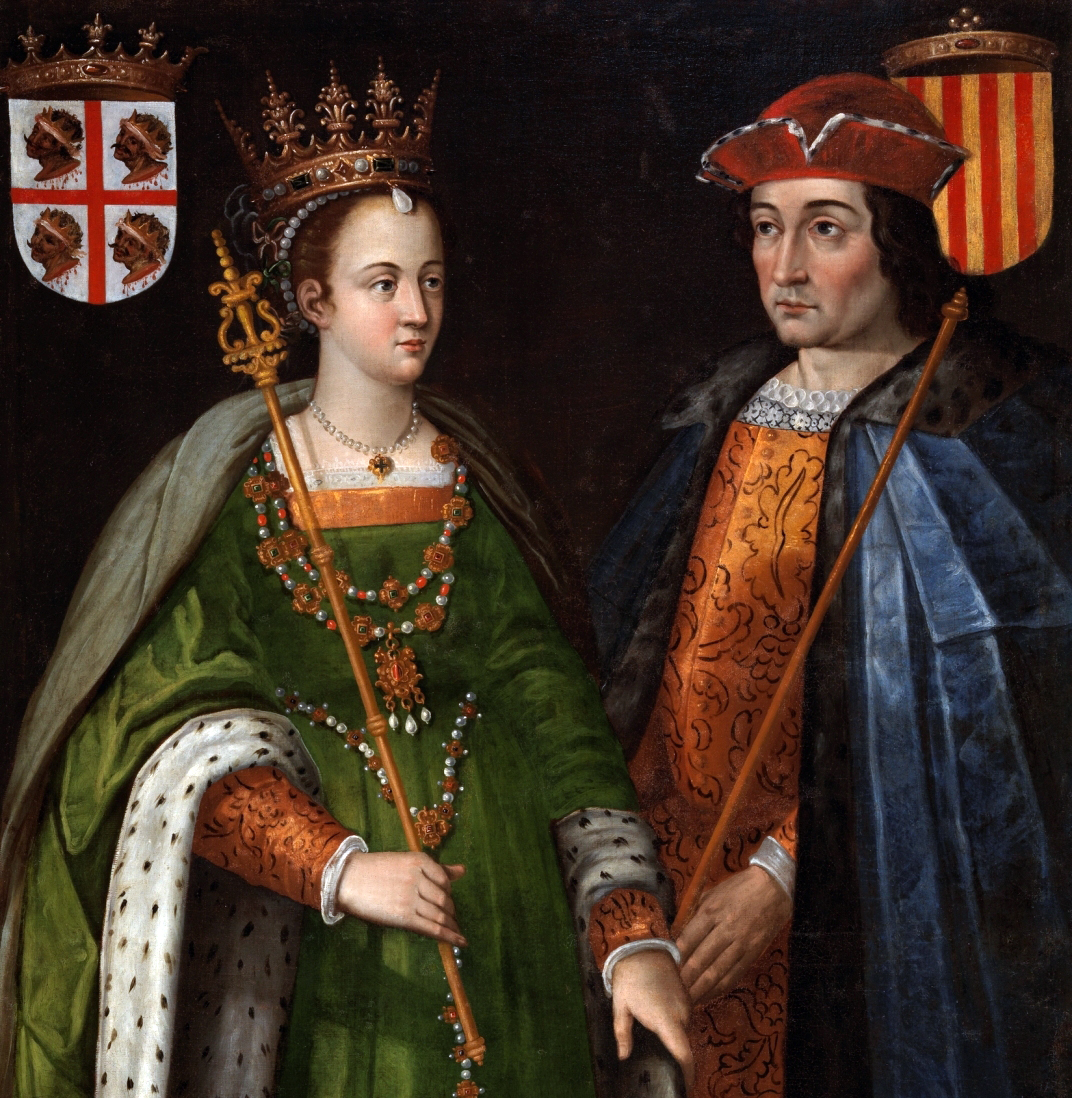
Queen Petronilla of Aragon and Ramon Berenguer IV, Count of Barcelona. 16th-century painting by Filippo Ariosto

In 1137 count Ramon Berenguer IV of Barcelona received the donation of the neighboring Kingdom of Aragon from king Ramiro II of Aragon, and in 1150 married his daughter, queen Petronilla, establishing the dynastic union of the County of Barcelona and its dominions with the Kingdom of Aragon, resulting in a composite monarchy known as the Crown of Aragon. The reign of Ramon Berenguer IV saw the Catalan conquest of Lleida and Tortosa. Their son, Alfons, was the first king to rule Aragon and Barcelona together; the titles would be perpetually linked from then on. During the reign of Alfons, in 1173, Catalonia was legally delimited for the first time, while the first compilation of the Usages of Barcelona was made in the process to turn them into the law of Catalonia (Consuetudinem Cathalonie). Apart from the Usages, between 1170 and 1195 the Liber feudorum maior (cartulary containing documents of the estates of the Royal house and the other comital houses that were incorporated into it) and the Gesta Comitum Barchinonensium (chronicle describing the origins, genealogical succession, and dynastic continuity of the counts of Barcelona) were compiled and written, being considered together as the three milestones of Catalan political identity.

His son, King Peter I (II of Aragon) "the Catholic", faced the defense of the Occitan territories, acquired from the times of Ramon Berenguer I onwards, from the Albigensian Crusade. The Battle of Muret (12 September 1213) and the unexpected defeat of King Peter and his vassals and allies, the counts of Toulouse, Comminges and Foix, against the French–Crusader armies, resulted in the fading of the strong human, cultural and economic ties existing between the ancient territories of Catalonia and the Languedoc.

In the Treaty of Corbeil, 1258, James I of Aragon, descendant of Sunifred and Bello of Carcassonne and therefore heir of the House of Barcelona, relinquished his family rights and dominions in the Languedoc and recognized the Capetian king of France Louis IX as heir of the Carolingian dynasty. In return, the King of France formally renounced his claims of feudal lordship over all the Catalan counties, confirming, from French point of view, the independence of the Catalan counties already established during the previous three centuries.

As a coastal territory within the Crown of Aragon and with the increasing importance of the port of Barcelona, Catalonia became the main centre of the Crown's maritime power, promoting and helping to expand its influence and power by conquest and trade into Valencia, the Balearic Islands, Sardinia and Sicily.

=== Medieval splendour of the Principality ===
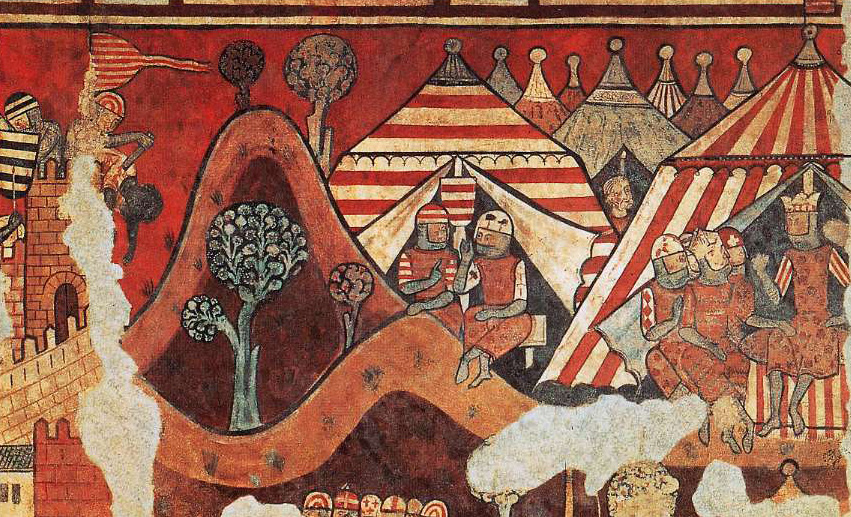
James I the Conqueror (at the right, seated and wearing a crown) during the conquest of Mallorca. Gothic painting (1285-1290), preserved at the National Art Museum of Catalonia

The Principality saw a prosperous period during the 13th century and the first half of the 14th. The population increased; Catalan language and culture expanded into the islands of the Western Mediterranean. The reign of Peter II (III of Aragon) "the Great" included the conquest of Sicily and the successful defense against a French crusade; his son and successor Alfons II (III of Aragon) "the Generous" conquered Menorca; and Peter's second son James II conquered Sardinia; Catalonia was the center of the empire, expanding and organizing it, establishing institutional systems similar to its own. Barcelona, then the most frequent royal residence, was consolidated as the administrative center of the domains with the establishment of the Royal Archives in 1318. The Catalan Company, mercenaries led by Roger de Flor and formed by Almogavar veterans of the War of the Sicilian Vespers, were hired by the Byzantine Empire to fight the Turks, defeating them in several battles. After the assassination of Roger de Flor by orders of the emperor's son Michael Palaiologos (1305), the Company took revenge by sacking Byzantine territory, and they conquered the duchies of Athens and Neopatras in the name of the King of Aragon. Catalan rule over Greek lands lasted until 1390.

This territorial expansion was accompanied by a great development of the Catalan trade, centered in Barcelona, creating an extensive trade network across the Mediterranean which competed with those of the maritime republics of Genoa and Venice. In this line, institutions were created that would give legal protection to merchants, such as the Consulate of the Sea and the Book of the Consulate of the Sea, one of the first compilations of maritime law.

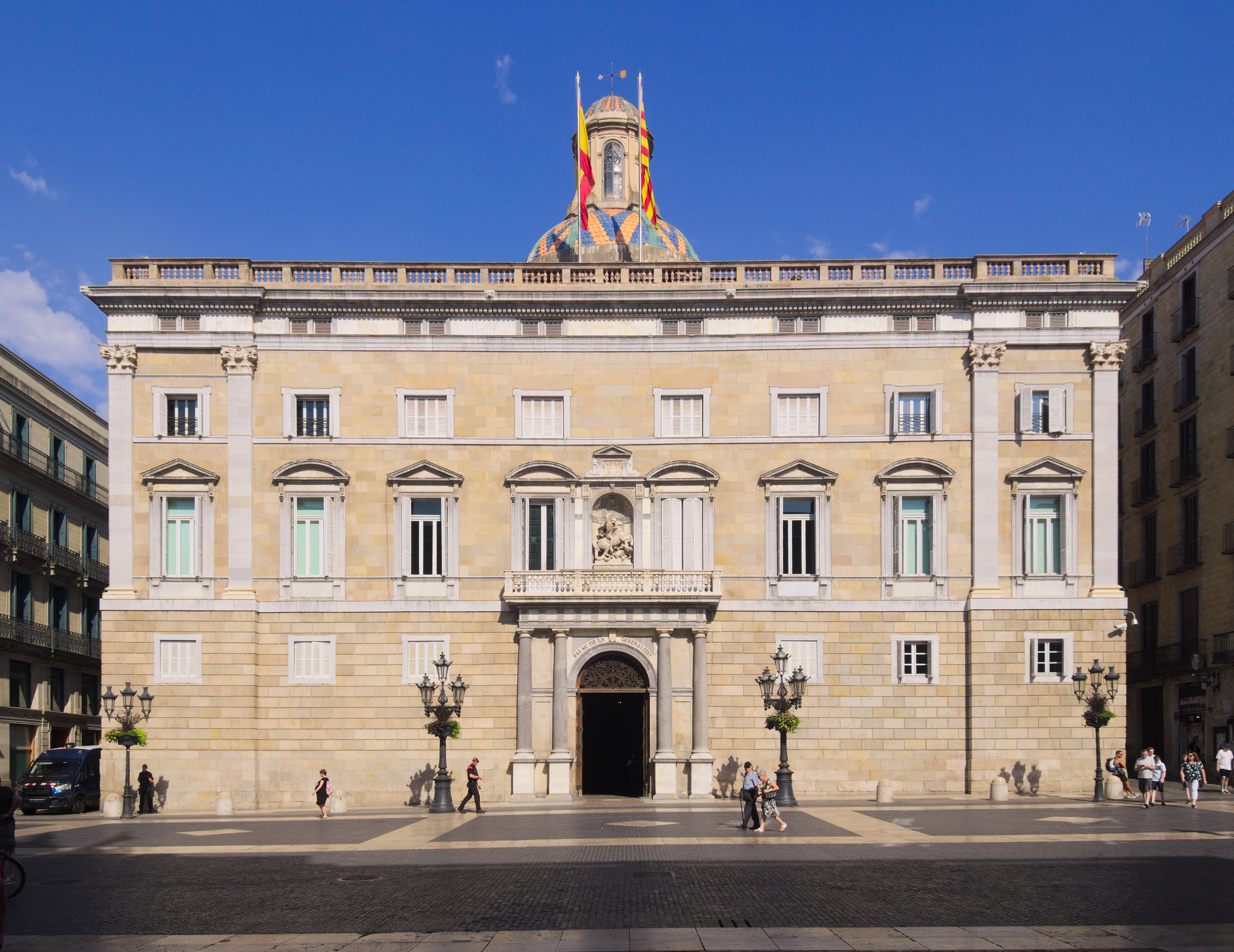
Palau de la Generalitat, ancient seat of the Deputation of the General, located in Barcelona

At the same time, the Principality of Catalonia developed a complex institutional and political system based on the concept of pact between the estates of the realm and the monarch. Legislation (whose main piece were the Catalan Constitutions) had to be approved in the General Court of Catalonia or Catalan Courts (Cort General de Catalunya or Corts Catalanes), a parliamentary body with roots dating from the 11-12th centuries Comital Court and Peace and Truce Assemblies which, from 1283 onwards, obtained the power to pass legislation along with the monarch, being the first parliament in medieval Europe to officially receive such recognition. The Courts were composed of the three Estates organized in to "arms" (braços) and presided over by the monarch as count of Barcelona. The first Catalan Constitutions, derived from the Usages of Barcelona, are of the ones from the Catalan Court of Barcelona from 1283. The last ones were promulgated by the Court of 1705–1706, presided by the disputed Habsburg King Charles III. The compilations of the Constitutions and other rights of Catalonia followed the Roman tradition of the Codex.

In order to collect the economic donation to the Crown approved by the Courts, in 1289 it was established temporary commissions dissolved at the end of the service. However, due to the large spending on the War of the Two Peters between Aragon and Castile (1356–1369), the General Court of Catalonia of 1358-1359, presided over by Peter III (IV of Aragon) "the Cerimonious" further reinforced the commission, establishing it as a representation of deputies and auditors, the Deputation of the General (in Catalan: Diputació del General) and later often known as Generalitat, becoming a permanent body in 1376 and gaining considerable political power over the next centuries.

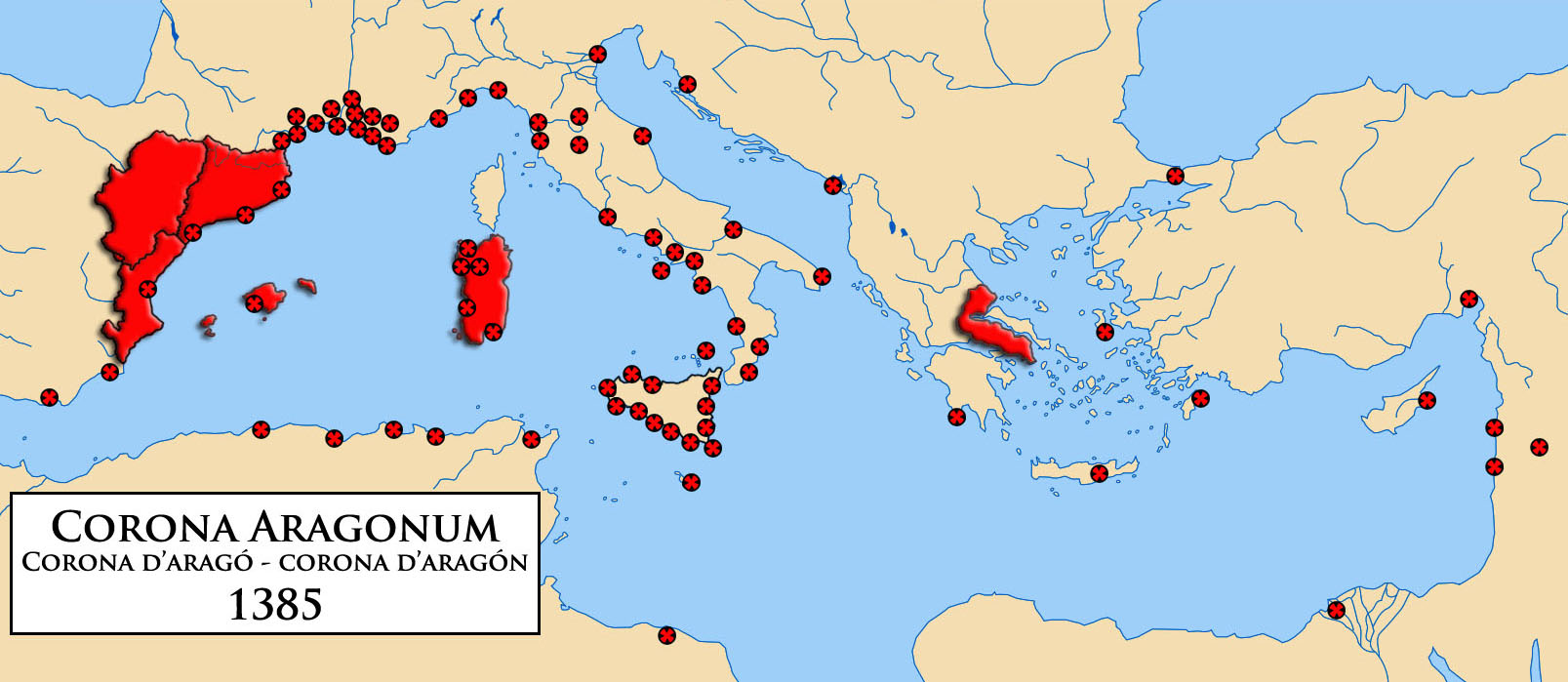
Crown of Aragon in 1385. Every dot represents a Consolate of the Sea

The second quarter of the 14th century saw crucial changes for Catalonia, marked by a succession of natural catastrophes, demographic crises, relative stagnation on the growth of Catalan economy, and the rise of social tensions. The year 1333 was known as Lo mal any primer (Catalan: "The first bad year") due to poor wheat harvest. The domains of the Aragonese Crown were affected severely by the Black Death pandemic and by later outbreaks of the plague. Between 1347 and 1497 Catalonia lost 37 percent of its population.

=== The 15th century ===
In 1410, King Martin I, the last reigning monarch of the House of Barcelona, died without surviving descendants. Under the Compromise of Caspe (1412), Ferdinand from the Castilian House of Trastámara received the Crown of Aragon as Ferdinand I of Aragon. Opposition to Ferdinand, led by the alternate candidate James II, Count of Urgell, was crushed in 1413. Ferdinand's successor, Alfons IV (V of Aragon) "the Magnanimous", promoted a new stage of Catalan-Aragonese expansion, this time over the Kingdom of Naples, over which he eventually gained rule in 1443. However, the absence of the king, who moved his residence to the city of Naples, aggravated the social crisis in the Principality, both in the countryside and in the cities. Political conflict in Barcelona arose due to the disputes over the control of the Consell de Cent between two political factions, Biga and Busca looking for a solution to the economic crisis. Meanwhile, the remença (serfs) peasants subjected to the feudal abuses known as evil customs (Catalan: Mals usos) began to organize themselves as a syndicate against seignorial pressures, seeking protection from the monarch. Alfonso's brother, John II "the Unreliable", ascent to the throne with both the Kingdom of Navarre and the Principality of Catalonia in deep social and political conflicts.

The opposition of the institutions of Catalonia to the policies of John II resulted in their support to the son of John, Charles, Prince of Viana over his denied dynastic rights. In response of the detention of Charles by his father, the Generalitat established a political body, the Council of the Principality, with whom, under menace of a conflict, John was forced to negotiate. The Capitulation of Vilafranca (1461) forced to release Charles from prison and appoint him lieutenant of Catalonia, while the king would need permission of the Generalitat to enter the Principality. The content of the Capitulation represented a culmination and consolidation of pactism and the constitutional system of Catalonia. However, King John's disagreement with the arrangement, the death of prince Charles shortly after (under suspicion of being poisoned), and the Remença Uprising in 1462 led to the ten-year Catalan Civil War (1462–1472) that left the country exhausted, its influence within the Crown and at international level weakened and its institutions in debt. In 1472, the last separate ruler of Catalonia, King René of Anjou "the Good", lost the war against King John. The Capitulation of Vilafranca was rejected.

John's son, Ferdinand II "the Catholic", recovered the northern Catalan counties (1493), occupied by France during the conflict, and profoundly reformed Catalan institutions in an attempt to solve the economic and political issues pending from the Civil War. In 1481, the Constitució de l'Observança (1481) was approved, formally establishing the submission of royal power to the laws approved in the Catalan Courts. After decades of conflict, the remença peasants were liberated from most of feudal abuses by the Sentencia Arbitral de Guadalupe (1486), in exchange for a payment.

=== Early modern Catalonia ===
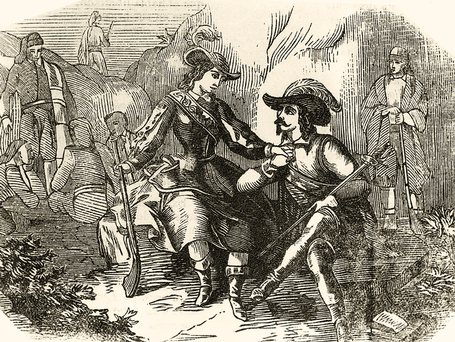
19th c. depiction of Joan de Serrallonga (1594-1634), a bandit and a popular figure in Catalan folklore. Bandrity in Catalonia during the 16th and 17th centuries was a complex social phenomenon in the countryside

The ascension to the throne of Aragon of Ferdinand II (1479), already married to Isabella I of Castile, put under a personal union two of the three major monarchies in the Iberian peninsula, while the Kingdom of Navarre was incorporated later following Ferdinand II's 1512 invasion of the Basque kingdom.

This resulted in the reinforcement of the concept of Spain, understood as a geographical term of the Iberian Peninsula, politically made up by the Crown of Aragon, Castile, and a Navarre annexed to Castile (1515). In 1492, the last remaining portion of Al-Andalus, the Emirate of Granada, was conquered and, shortly after, the Spanish conquest of the Americas began. Political power began to shift away from Aragon toward Castile and, subsequently, from Castile to the Spanish Empire, which engaged in frequent warfare in Europe striving for world domination. In 1516 Charles I of Spain became the first king to rule the Crowns of Castile and Aragon simultaneously by his own right. Following the death of his paternal (House of Habsburg) grandfather, Maximilian I, Holy Roman Emperor, he was also elected Charles V, Holy Roman Emperor, in 1519. The reign of Charles V was a relative stable period, during which Catalonia generally accepted its new role within the Habsburg monarchy, despite its own marginalization.

For an extended period, Catalonia, as state of the Monarchy of Spain, successfully retained its own institutional system and legislation against the trend observed in southern and central Europe throughout the early modern age, which eroded the importance of representative institutions, until they were finally suppressed as a result of the War of the Spanish Succession defeat at the beginning of the 18th century. Between the 16th and 18th centuries, the role of the political community in local affairs and the general government of the country was increased, while the royal powers remained relatively restricted, which was attested after the two last Courts (1701–1702 and 1705–1706). The prolonged absence of the monarchs, who resided most of the time in Castile, led to the consolidation of the figure of the viceroy as the representative of the king in the Principality.

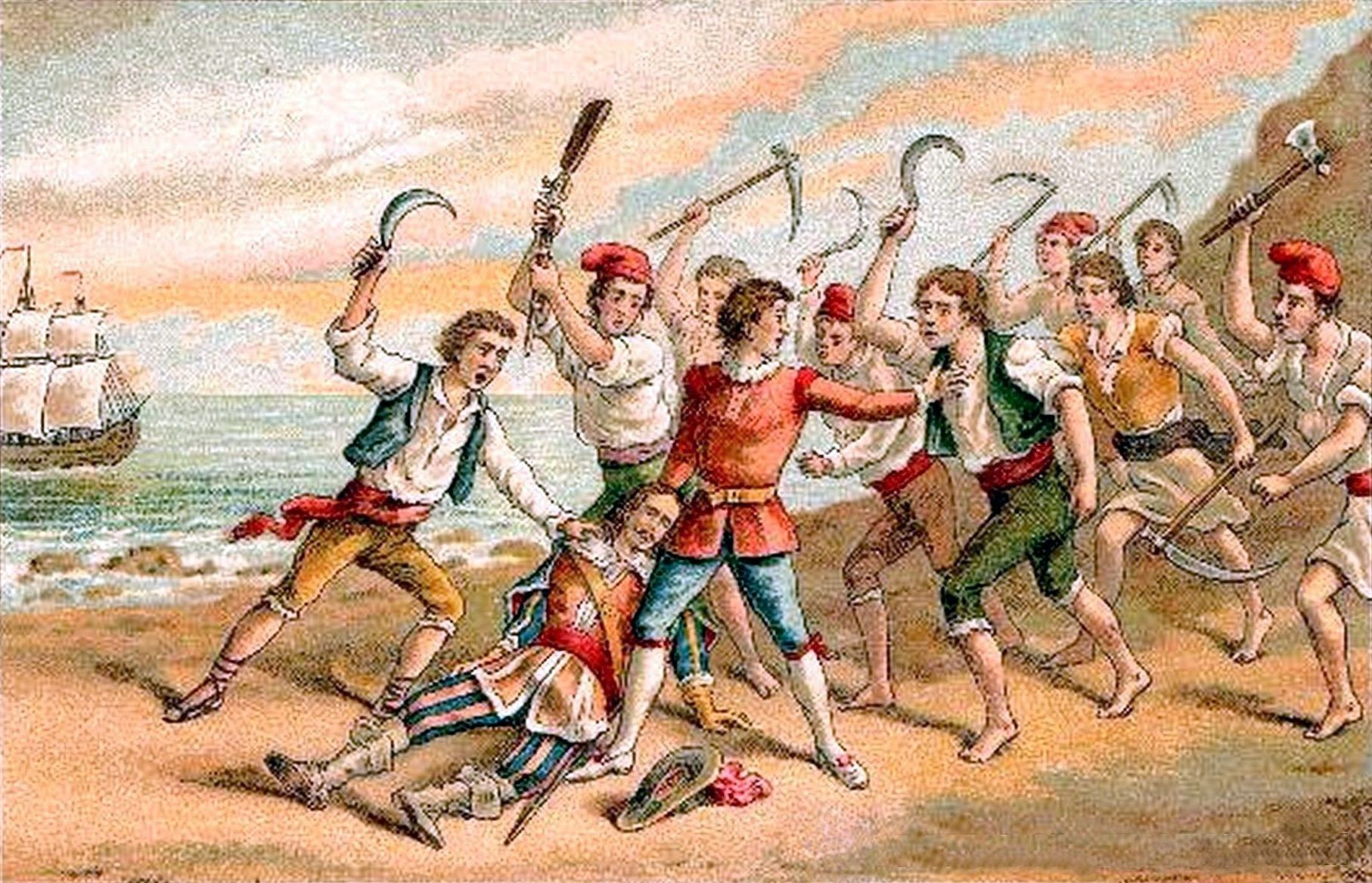
The Catalan's revolt "Corpus of Blood" (7 June 1640), one of the initial events of the Reapers' War

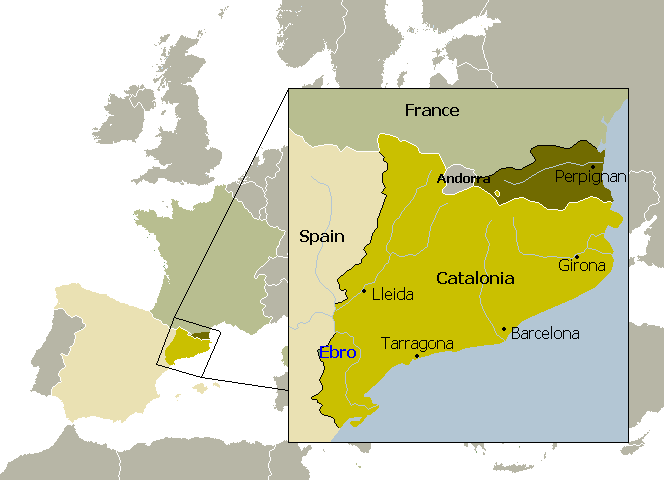
The color shading shows the division between the Principality of Catalonia (present-Spain) and the counties of Roussillon and Cerdagne (present-France) divided in 1659

However, over the next century, Catalonia was on the losing side of a series of wars that led steadily to more centralization of power in Spain. The period saw a rise in Barbary piracy along the coast and banditry in the countryside. Tensions between the constitutional Catalan institutions and the gradually more centralized monarchy began to arise. In 1626 the Count-Duke of Olivares, minister of Philip III (IV of Castile), tried to establish the military contribution of the states of the monarchy, the Unión de Armas (Union of Arms), but the resistance of Catalonia to the project was strong. This events, alongside other factors such as the economic crisis, the continuous presence of royal soldiers and the peasants' revolts led to the Reapers' War (1640–1652), in the context of the Franco-Spanish War, in which Catalonia, governed by a Junta de Braços (revolutionary assembly or States-General) led by the president of the Generalitat, Pau Claris, broke with the Spanish king and briefly established itself as an independent republic under French protection between 1640 and 1641, and later entered in a personal union with the Kingdom of France, appointing French king Louis XIII as count of Barcelona, but, after the first military successes, Catalans were finally defeated and reincorporated into the Crown of Spain in 1652.

In 1659, after the Treaty of the Pyrenees signed by Philip IV and Louis XIV, the counties of Roussillon (including the comarques of Conflent, Vallespir and Capcir) and northern half of Cerdanya (today known as French Cerdagne), were ceded to France, constituting the new French province of Roussillon. The town of Llívia remained part of Spain, however, an isolated enclave a mile north of the new border. In the Roussillon, Catalan institutions were suppressed and, in 1700, public use of Catalan language was prohibited. Eventually, this region has come to be popularly known as Northern Catalonia, the northernmost part of the Catalan-speaking lands; currently, the ancient province of Roussillon is administratively part of the French Département of Pyrénées-Orientales.

In the last decades of the 17th century during the reign of Spain's last Habsburg king, Charles II, despite intermittent conflict between Spain and France and new internal conflicts like the Revolt of the Barretines (1687–1689), the population increased to approximately 500.000 inhabitants and the Catalan economy improved. This economic growth was boosted by the export of wine to England and the Dutch Republic, as due to the trade war of French minister Jean-Baptiste Colbert against the Dutch and later to the participation of these countries in the Nine Years' War against France were not able to trade with the French. This new situation caused many Catalans to look to England and, especially, the Netherlands as political and economic models for Catalonia.

At the dawn of the War of the Spanish Succession, the Bourbon Duke of Anjou claimed the throne of Spain as Philip V (IV of Aragon), and the Principality initially supported his claim. However, repressive measures of the viceroy Francisco de Velasco and authoritarian decisions of the king (some of them contrary to Catalan legislation), as well the economic policy and distrust to the French absolutism provoked that Catalonia to change sides in 1705, when Habsburg candidate, the Archduke Charles of Austria (as Charles III of Spain) landed in Barcelona. Previously, the same year, the Principality of Catalonia and the Kingdom of England signed the Pact of Genoa, receiving the first one protection to its institutions and liberties, entering in the pro-Habsburg Grand Alliance.

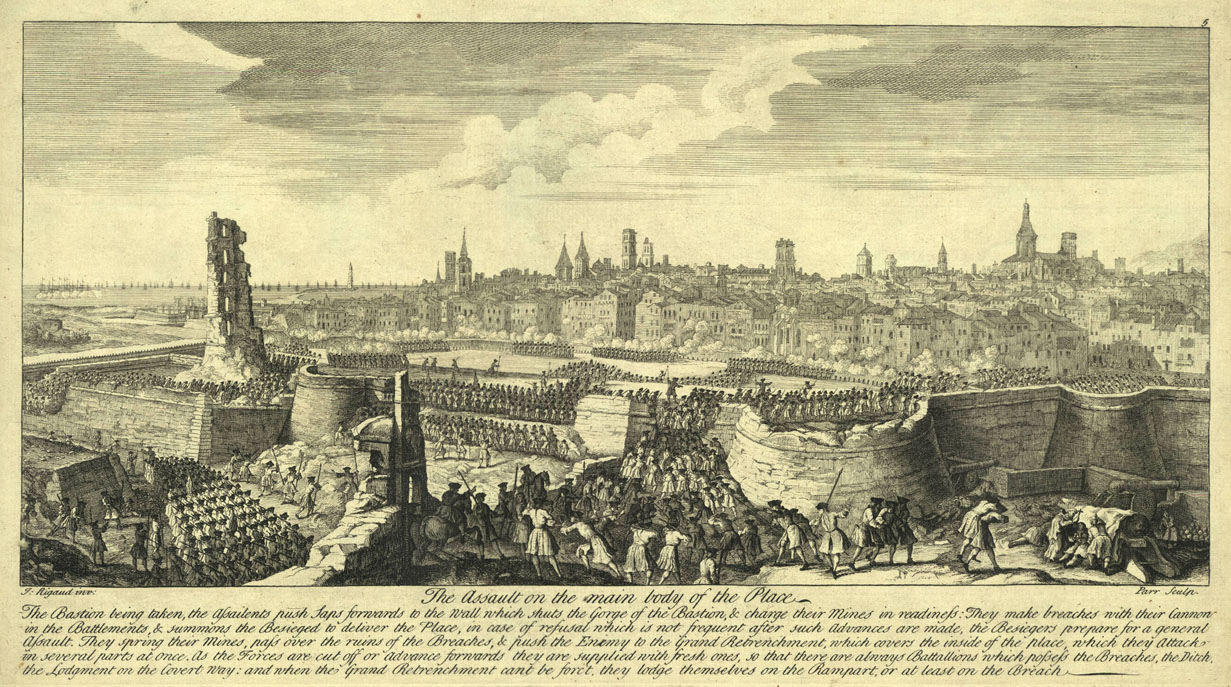
Fall of Barcelona, 11 September 1714

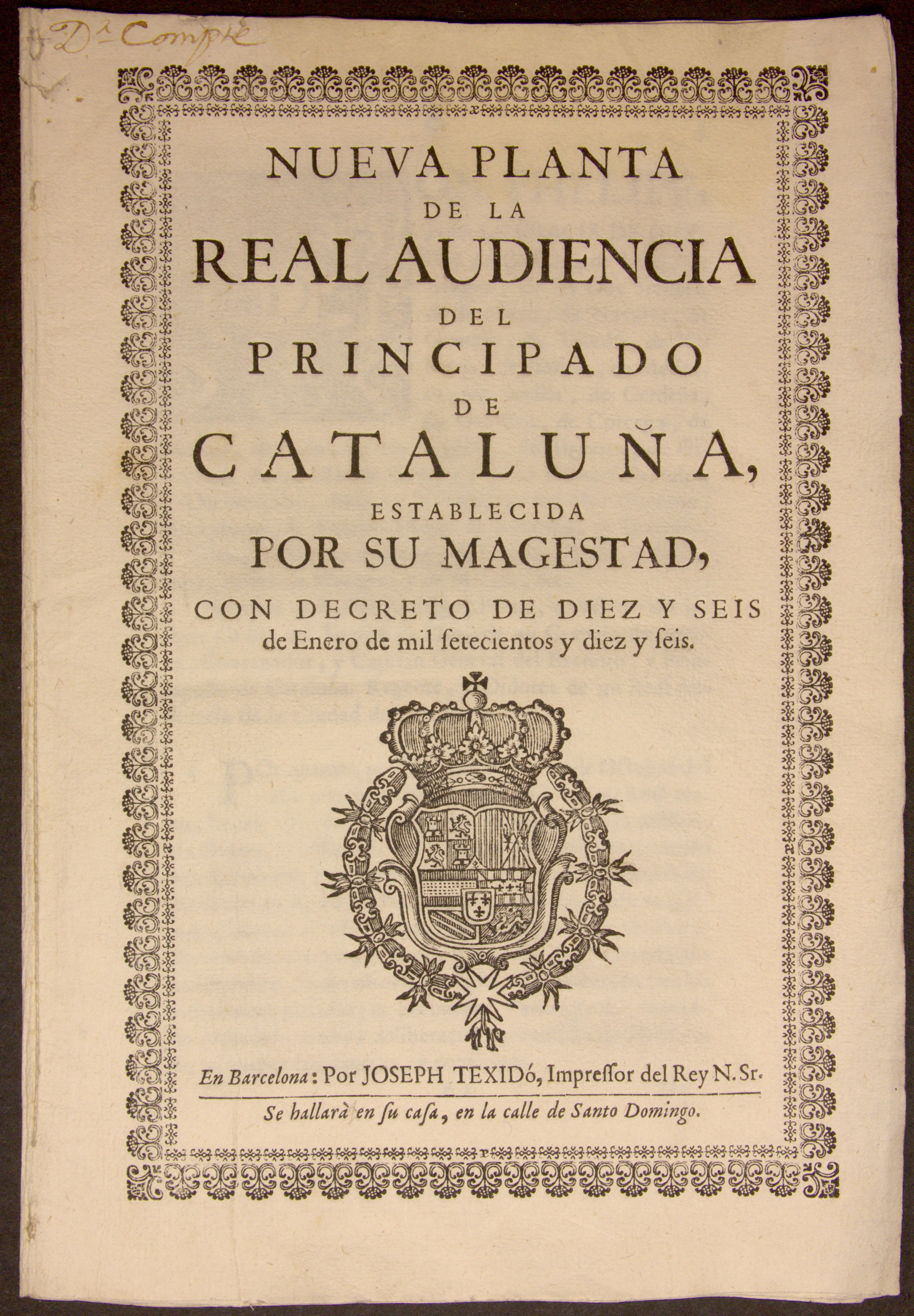
Cover of the Nueva Planta Decree of the Principality of Catalonia (1716)

The Treaty of Utrecht (1713) put end to the war at international level, and the allied armies withdrew from Catalonia which, nonetheless, remained fighting with its own army by decision of the Junta de Braços in a separate conflict known as the War of the Catalans, lasting until the capitulation of Barcelona after a long siege on 11 September 1714. The victorious army of Philip V occupied the capital of Catalonia and (as happened to the kingdoms of Aragon and Valencia, also loyals to Charles) the king enacted the Nueva Planta decrees in 1716. The Decree abolished the main Catalan institutions and public laws (while keeping the private and mercantile laws) and replacing them with those of Castile, establishing absolutism as the new political system, and imposed the administrative use of Spanish language, progressively displacing Catalan.

=== After Nueva Planta ===
Apart from the abolition of the Catalan institutions, the Nueva Planta decrees ensured the imposition of the new absolutist system by reforming the Royal Audience of Catalonia, making it the highest governmental body of the Principality, absorbing many of the functions of the abolished institutions and becoming the instrument with which the Captain General of Catalonia, the supreme authority of the province (replacing the viceroy), appointed by the king, would govern. The division in vegueries was replaced with Castilian corregimientos. The imposition of a new tax, the cadastre, by royal decree, multiplied the tax burden in Catalonia sevenfold. So late as in the 18th and 19th centuries, despite the military occupation, the high new taxes and the political economy of the House of Bourbon, the Catalonia under Spanish administration, now as a province, resumed the process of proto-industrialization, relatively helped at the end of the century from the beginning of open commerce to America and protectionist policies enacted by the Spanish government (although the policy of Spanish government during those times changed many times between free trade and protectionism), consolidating the new economic growth model that was taking place in Catalonia since the end of the 17th century, becoming a center of Spain's industrialization; to this day, it remains one of the most industrialized parts of Spain.

In 1833, by decree of minister Javier de Burgos, all of Spain was organized into provinces, including Catalonia, which was divided in four provinces without common administration: Barcelona, Girona, Lleida and Tarragona. Despite various attempts throughout the next decades, Catalonia wouldn't regain the administrative unity until 1914, when the four Catalan provinces were authorized to create a commonwealth (Catalan: Mancomunitat), and the political autonomy until 1932, when the Generalitat was revived as a modern institution of self-government.

== Term and concept of Principality ==
The Principality of Catalonia in 1608 or 1612 by Jan Baptist Vrients

The term "Principality" comes from the Latin Principatus, which in antiquity could mean "preeminence", "supremacy", "sovereignty", or "power", deriving from princeps, a term that in Christendom became generically associated with the sovereign power of monarchs. During the 10th and 11th centuries, princeps was used sporadically as an honorary title (neither hereditary nor tied to a specific territory) among various counts from what would later be Catalonia, although over time its use became specifically tied to the counts of Barcelona. Between the 12th and 14th centuries, the reception of Roman law adapted to the feudal world reinforced the monarchical and sovereign meaning of princeps. The Count of Barcelona, Ramon Berenguer I, is called "Prince of Barcelona, Count of Girona and Marchis of Ausona" (princeps Barchinonensis, comes Gerundensis, marchio Ausonensis) in the Act of Consecration of the Cathedral of Barcelona (1058). There are also several references to the Prince in the Usages of Barcelona. Usage #64 calls principatus the group of counties of Barcelona, Girona, and Osona, all of them under the authority of the Count of Barcelona.

It was throughout the 12th century when the Catalan counties began to form a unified and cohesive political entity –although jurisdictionally divided–, as the counts of Barcelona incorporated or vassallized the other Catalan counts and later on they became kings of Aragon, which helped them to prevail over the rest of the autonomous Catalan counts (Pallars, Urgell and Empúries), while also conquered the Islamic territories of Tortosa and Lleida. As the Count of Barcelona added those counties under his jurisdiction, the name of Catalonia was used for the whole. The terms "Catalonia" and "Catalans" were commonly used to refer to the territory as well as its inhabitants, and not just the County of Barcelona, at least since the beginnings of the 12th century, as shown in the earliest recordings of these names in the Liber maiolichinus de gestis Pisanorum illustribus (written between 1117–1125).

The first reference to the term Principat de Cathalunya is found in the dispute between Peter IV of Aragon and III of Barcelona and the Kingdom of Mallorca in 1343, and it was used again in the convocation of the General Court of Catalonia held in Perpignan in 1350, presided by Peter III. It was intended to indicate that the territory under the laws produced by those Courts was not a kingdom, but the enlargement of the territory under the authority of the Count of Barcelona, who was also the King of Aragon, as seen in the Actas de las cortes generales de la Corona de Aragón 1362–1363. However, there is an older reference, in Bernat Desclot's chronicles, dating from the second half of the 13th century, in which he describes the sovereign as "prince of Catalonia, count of Barcelona".

The name "Principality of Catalonia" is abundant in historical documentation that refers to Catalonia between the mid-14th century and early 19th century. It became an official and widespread category as it became synonymous with the term "kingdom" in the political, material sense, which alluded generically to polities historiographically categorized under the concept of medieval and early modern States. This political entity was part of various composite monarchies or dynastic conglomerates, such as the Crown of Aragon, the Spanish Monarchy and the Kingdom of France (1641–1652), being equivalent to the other political entities of the time, such as the kingdoms of Aragon, Valencia and Castile in Iberia, or England, Scotland and the Duchy of Milan in Europe.

Following the Nueva Planta decree of 1716 and the subsequent dismantling of the Catalan institutional and legal system, the territory being annexed to Castile became a province of the new and more unified Kingdom of Bourbon Spain, but "Principality" continued to be the definition of the territory, as witnessed in the Nueva Planta decree itself. This state of affairs remained until the Kingdom of Spain was transformed permanently into a liberal state in 1833, when Javier de Burgos eliminated the province of the Principality of Catalonia, dividing it into the current four provinces. Thus, the term disappeared from the administrative and political reality of the country.

Today, the Statute of Autonomy of Catalonia doesn't mention this denomination, but it is popular among the general public and particularly, despite being republican, those who advocate for Catalan independence, in order to distinguish it from the other Catalan Countries.

=== Modern revisionism ===
In recent times, despite the term "Principality" or the historical existence of a Catalan polity is widely accepted at academic level, it has been often ignored, misrepresented or criticized in historical divulgation, social media and in political arena, particularly in Spain. The pseudo-debate about its existence became particularly widespread during the first decades of the 21st century due to the increasing demands for Catalan self-determination, being used as a tool to deny any possible historical legitimization of Catalan demands.

== Government and law ==
=== Pactist system ===
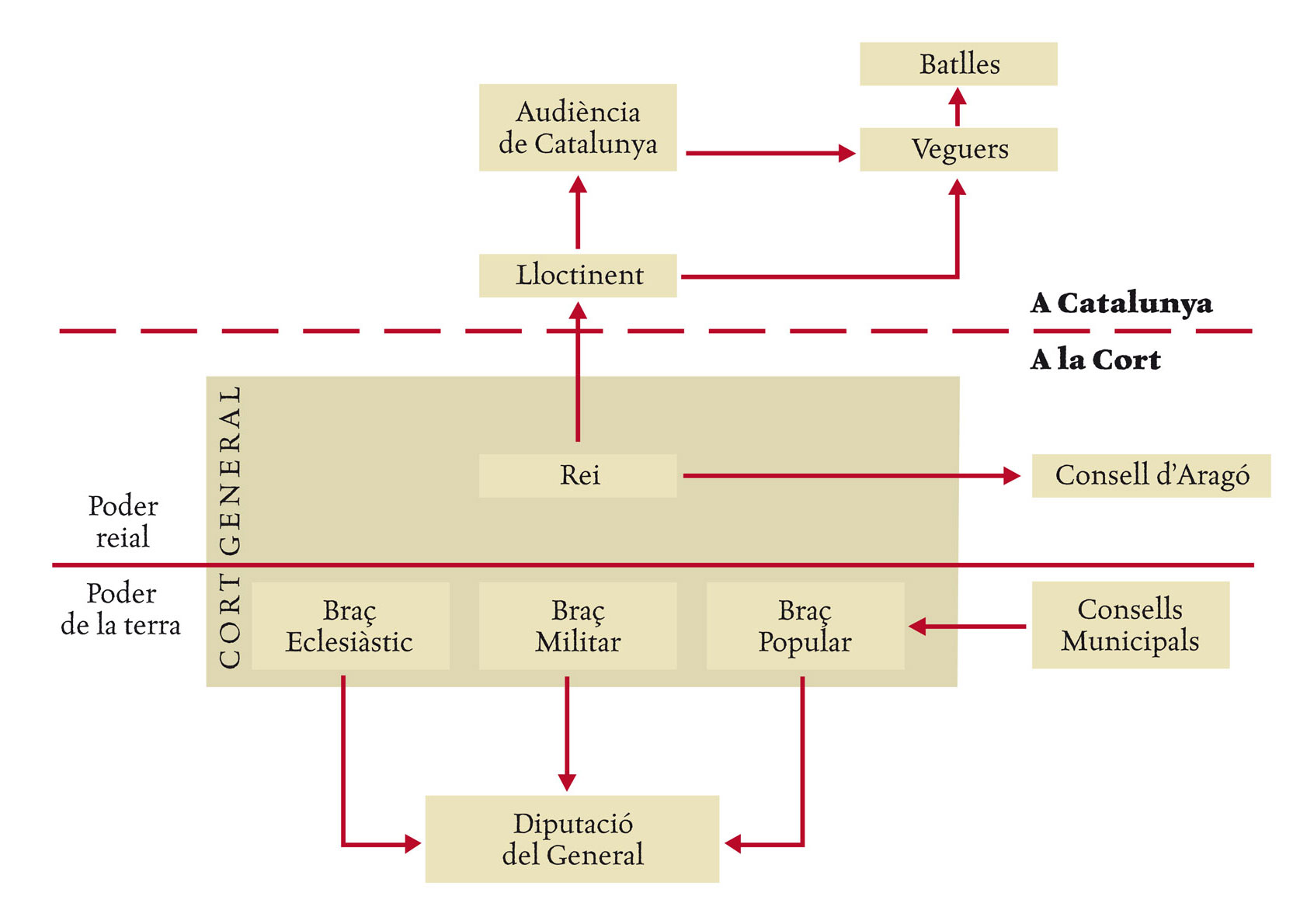
Political organization of the Principality of Catalonia in the early modern era, distinguishing between royal power and the institutions of the land, which were structured around the General Court and the Deputation of the General.

Pactism or contractualism was an institutional model, a doctrine, and a political practice present in Europe since the Early Middle Ages that served as a counterpoint to the later conception of monarchical sovereignty associated with absolutism. Historian Joaquim Albareda defines it as a doctrine based on mutual respect for the fulfillment of pacts between the king and his subjects; this doctrine formed the foundation of the composite monarchy and found its fullest expression in the lands of the Crown of Aragon. Specifically, it achieved one of its most sophisticated formulations in the Principality of Catalonia.

Historians of law Tomàs de Montagut and Pere Ripoll identify two fundamental legal principles of Catalonia's medieval and early modern political constitution:

- Juridical pactism: the drafting of general legislation, specifically the Constitutions and the Chapters of Court, required negotiation between the monarch and the estates assembled in the General Court of Catalonia, as well as the final consent of both parties.
- Rule of law: everyone was bound to observe the law in force, including the monarch himself and his officials. Under the medieval legal conception underpinning this principle, law was not viewed as a free creation of political power, but rather as the declaration of a pre-existing order that was binding upon the sovereign as well.

Moreover, this system operated within an order characterized by a plurality of jurisdictions and powers whose relationships were symbiotic and based on coordination rather than strict hierarchy. On this basis, Montagut and Ripoll characterize the Catalan political community as a dualist monarchy: at the highest level, it was represented by the prince and by the "General of Catalonia", the political body of the Principality. Its representative bodies were the estates assembled in the General Court of Catalonia and, on a permanent basis, the Deputation of the General. The relationship between these two powers was grounded in fidelity and conditioned by adherence to Catalan law. Albareda notes that, although the system functioned within the framework of an estate-based society typical of the Ancien régime, it incorporated mechanisms for political representation and tied general legislation to the consensus of the estates assembled in the Court.

=== Institutions ===
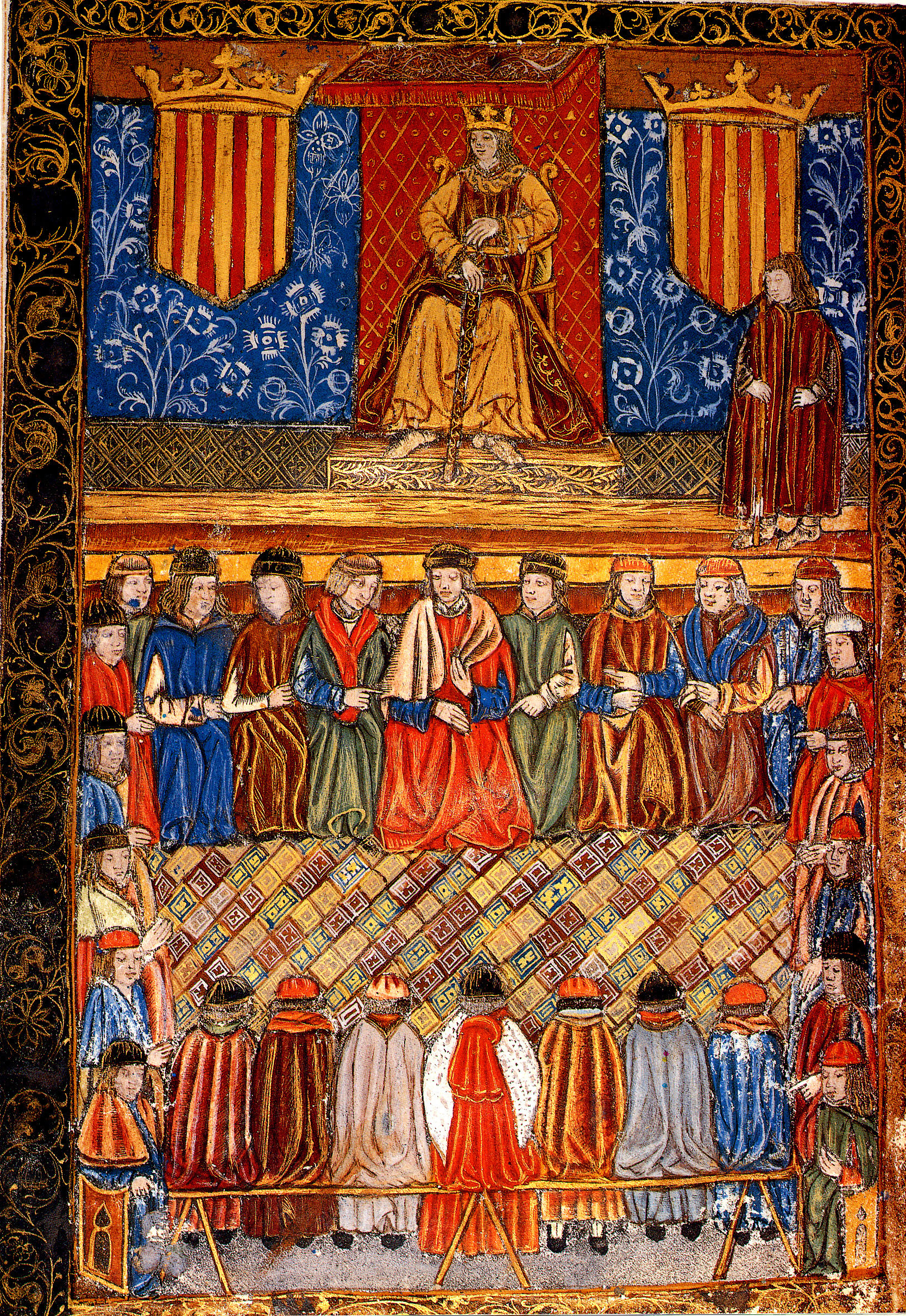
The General Court of Catalonia (parliament) in the 15th century, presided over by Ferdinand II of Aragon

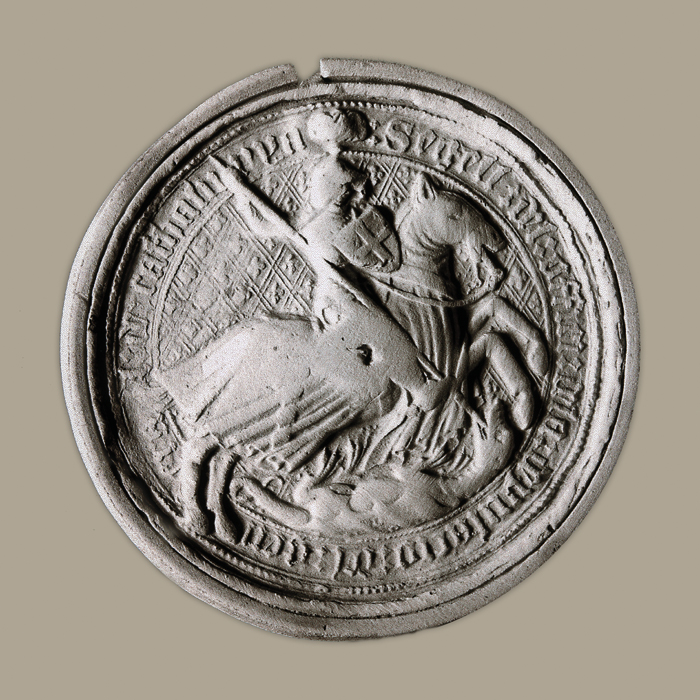
Seal of the Deputation of the General or Generalitat of Catalonia, depicting Saint George, patron saint of the institution

- Cort General de Catalunya or Corts Catalanes (General Court of Catalonia or Catalan Courts): parliamentary body and main institution of the Principality, established during the 13th century and legally regulated in 1283. Summoned and presided by the monarch as count of Barcelona, it was composed by representatives the three estates of the realm (braços) and passed the general legislation and the economic donation to the Crown. Also served as monarch's council and as the place where the king could administer justice.
- Diputació del General or Generalitat de Catalunya (Deputation of the General or Generalitat of Catalonia): permanent council of deputies, established in 1359 by the Court in order to collect the "taxes of the General" (indirect tax imposed over all of the jurisdictions), and later gained political power and tasks of prosecutor, becoming the most relevant Catalan institution during the early modern age. It consisted of three deputies and three oïdors (auditors of accounts), there was one deputy and one oïdor by estate.
- Consell de Cent de Barcelona (Council of One Hundred of Barcelona): institution of government of the city of Barcelona, established during the reign of James I. The municipal authority rested on five, later six, counselors (led by the Conseller en cap, Chief Counselor) elected by a Council of approximately hundred individuals (jurats).
- Reial Audiència de Catalunya (Royal Audience of Catalonia): supreme court of justice of Catalonia and the core of the royal government of the Principality, established in 1493. Its members were elected by the king, and it was presided by the chancellor (Canceller) during the absence of the viceroy. Unlike the audiences of Aragon, Valencia and Majorca, it was the ultimate appellate jurisdiction over all cases of the Principality (except cases concerning the granting of certain privileges, the Royal patrimony or involving royal officers). This judicial independence was especially valued by the Catalans of the time.
- Batllia General de Catalunya
- Conferència dels Tres Comuns (Conference of the Three Commons): joint meeting of the most dynamic and powerful institutions of the Catalan constitutional system during the 17th and 18th centuries: the Generalitat, the Military Estate and the Consell de Cent of Barcelona, in order to discuss and solve the political issues of the Principality. Dissolved by Bourbon authorities in 1704, it was restablished and legally regulated by Charles III. As a consequence of the evacuation of Allied armies and Habsburg officers, during the War of the Catalans (1713-1714) the Conference became the directory of government of the Principality until the end of the conflict.
- Junta de Braços or Braços Generals (lit. 'Council of Arms' or 'States-General'): extraordinary parliamentary council convened by the Generalitat, composed by the representatives of the Catalan Courts who at that time were in Barcelona. The Junta operated like the Courts, but formally lacking legislative powers.
- Tribunal de Contrafaccions (Court of Contraventions): court of justice established by the Court of 1701–1702 and improved by the Court of 1705-1706 in order to ensure the application of the Constitutions, as well as solving and prosecuting any decisions contrary to the Catalan legislation, including the ones performed by the king or his officers, a similar role to a modern constitutional court. Its members were elected in parity by the institutions of the land and the king. It represented an important advance in the guarantee of individual and civil rights, even at the European context.

=== Legislation ===
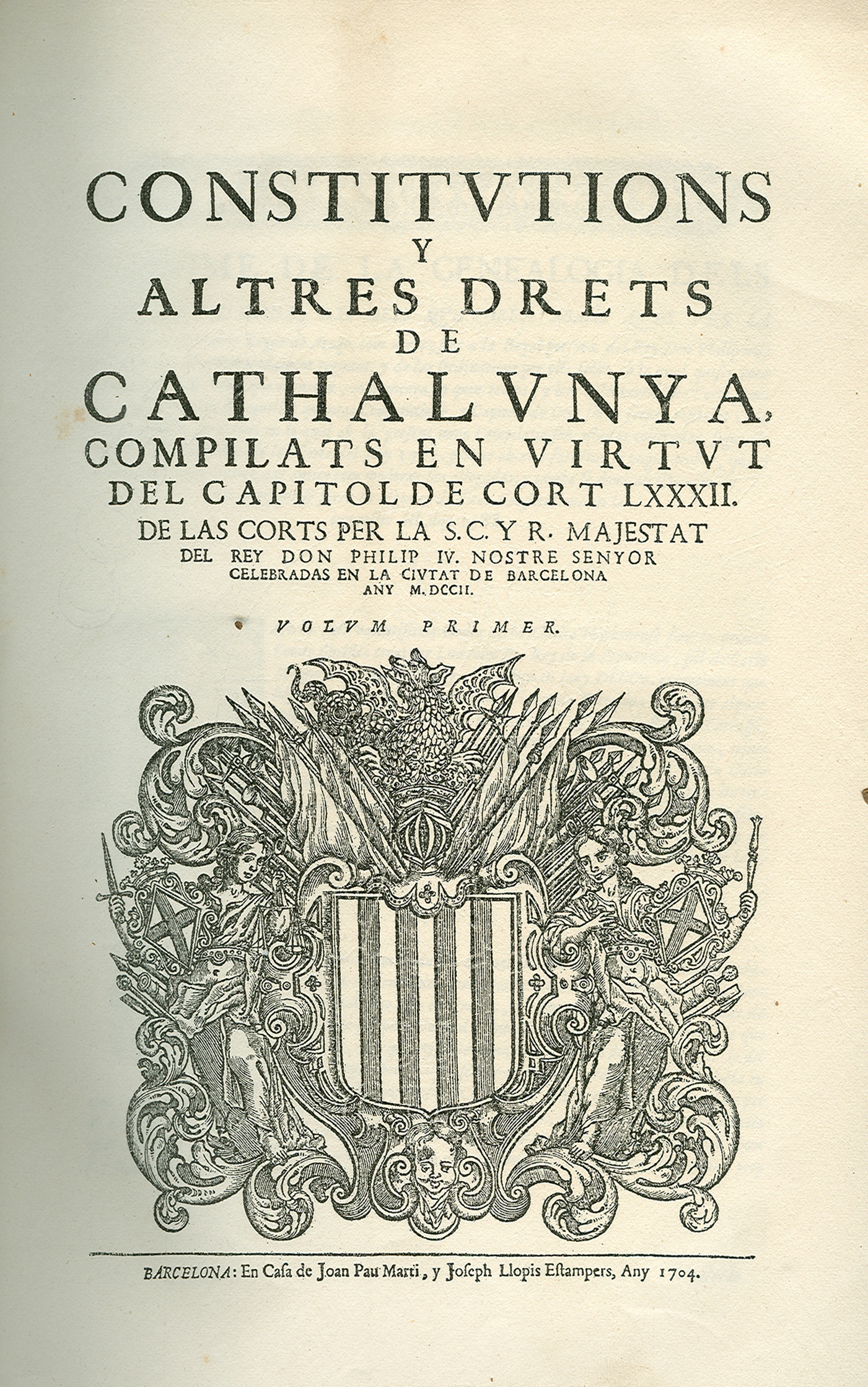
1704 compilation of the Constitutions of Catalonia

- Constitucions de Catalunya (Constitutions of Catalonia): laws introduced and promulgated by the king and approved by the General Court of Catalonia. They had pre-eminence over the other legal rules (including royal decrees) and could only be revoked by the Courts themselves.
- Usatges de Barcelona (Usages of Barcelona): compilation of customs and legislation based on the Roman and Visigothic law of the County of Barcelona, applied to the entirely of the Principality after 1251, that form the basis for the Constitutions of Catalonia.
- Capítols de Cort (Chapters of Court): laws introduced by the Estates of the Court (or just one of them but with the consent of the other two) and approved by the king. If he approved it, the simple notation "It pleases the Lord King" was made, although it was not uncommon for the king to also include certain restrictions or clarifications on the request.
- Actes de Cort (Acts of Court): minor legislative and other rules and decrees promulgated by the Courts, which did not need the formal approval of the king. They mostly served temporary purposes and did not possess the significance of the Constitutions or Chapters of Court. Examples included appointments to offices, financial resolutions, the authorization of petitions, mandates issued to deputies, etc.

=== Royal Officers ===
- Lloctinent or Virrei de Catalunya (Lieutenant or Viceroy of Catalonia): representative of the king in the Principality from the 15th to the 18th centuries. As the alter nos of the monarch, he received the same treatment and honours. Catalan Constitutions allowed to appoint non-Catalans as viceroys.
- Portantveus de General Governador (Speaker of the General Governor): highest official of the ordinary royal administration. The main responsibilities comprised the administration of justice throughout the territory. Legally, when the king died, he assumed the royal faculties and replaced the viceroy, an event known as vice regia, until the new king swore the Constitutions.
- Canceller de Catalunya (Chancellor of Catalonia): president, under normal circumstances, of the Royal Audience of Catalonia. The Chancellor of Catalonia was originally the Chancellor of the Crown of Aragon until the establishment of the Council of Aragon in 1493, when his functions were reduced to the Principality. He was a member of the clergy, presiding over all the cases of the Audience, both secular and ecclesiastical, and the keeper of the Royal Seal.
- Mestre Racional: royal official who was in charge of the accounting of the Principality. There were one Mestre in every realm of the Crown of Aragon. He recorded the accounts indicating the expenses and income of the royal patrimony. The Mestre Racional of the Principality of Catalonia also had jurisdiction over the kingdoms of Majorca and Sardinia.

=== Vegueries ===
Vegueries of Catalonia in 1304. Yellow and brown territories were lordships without a veguer

The vegueria was the basic territorial division of the royal administration in the Principality of Catalonia, headed by a veguer. The precursor of the royal veguer was the comital vicarius, an official acting as a delegate of the count or, at times, the viscount. From the 10th century onwards, these officials became increasingly linked to specific territories, a process intensified as various Catalan counties were incorporated into the County of Barcelona. Amidst the expansion of seigneurial jurisdictions, the royal veguer assumed an increasingly important role in royal administration from the 12th century onwards.

The veguer was a royal officer appointed by the king and representing him in the vegueria. He was the military commander of his vegueria (and thus the superintendent of royal castles) in charge of the mobilization of the sometent to maintain public order and its chief of justice, as well as being responsible of the public finances of the district. As time wore on, the functions of the veguer became more judicial in nature. He held a cort (court) del veguer or de la vegueria with its own seal. It commonly heard pleas to the Crown, civil, and criminal cases. The cort had authority in all matters save those relating to the feudal aristocracy.

The territorial configuration of the vegueries was shaped by geography, the influence of urban centers, the prevailing jurisdictional and baronial arrangements, and tradition. The network of vegueries did not, however, represent a uniform royal jurisdiction: extensive baronial estates retained their own jurisdictions, and certain counties and viscounties also maintained their own vegueries. The organizational structure also included some vegueries usually governed by a subveguer (sotsveguer), as well as subordinate subvegueries (sotsvegueries). The Aran Valley remained outside the vegueria system and was ruled by a royal governor whose duties were equivalent to those of the veguer.

At the end of the 12th century in Catalonia, there were 12 vegueries. By the end of the reign of Peter "the Great" (1285) there were 17, and by the time of James the Just, there were 21. After the French annexion of the vegueries of Perpignan and Vilafranca de Conflent in 1659, the Principality of Catalonia retained a division of 15 vegueries and nine sotsvegueries. In 1716 the Nueva Planta Decree suppressed them, being replaced by the Castilian corregimientos.

== Military ==
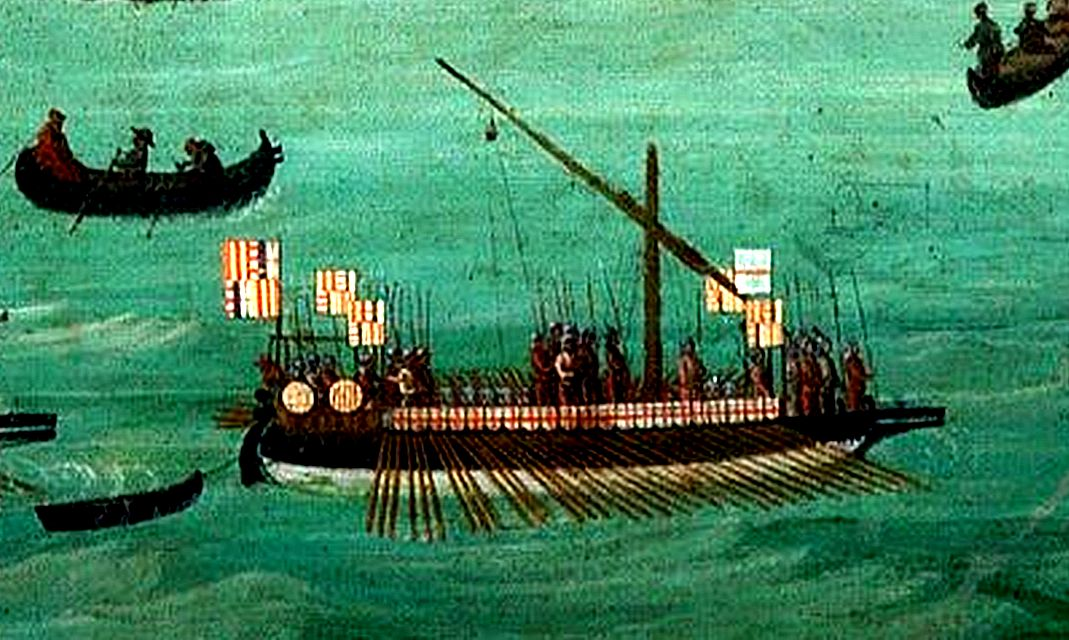
Catalan galley of the admiral Galceran de Requesens i Joan de Soler, Tavola Strozzi, 1470. National Museum of San Martino, Naples

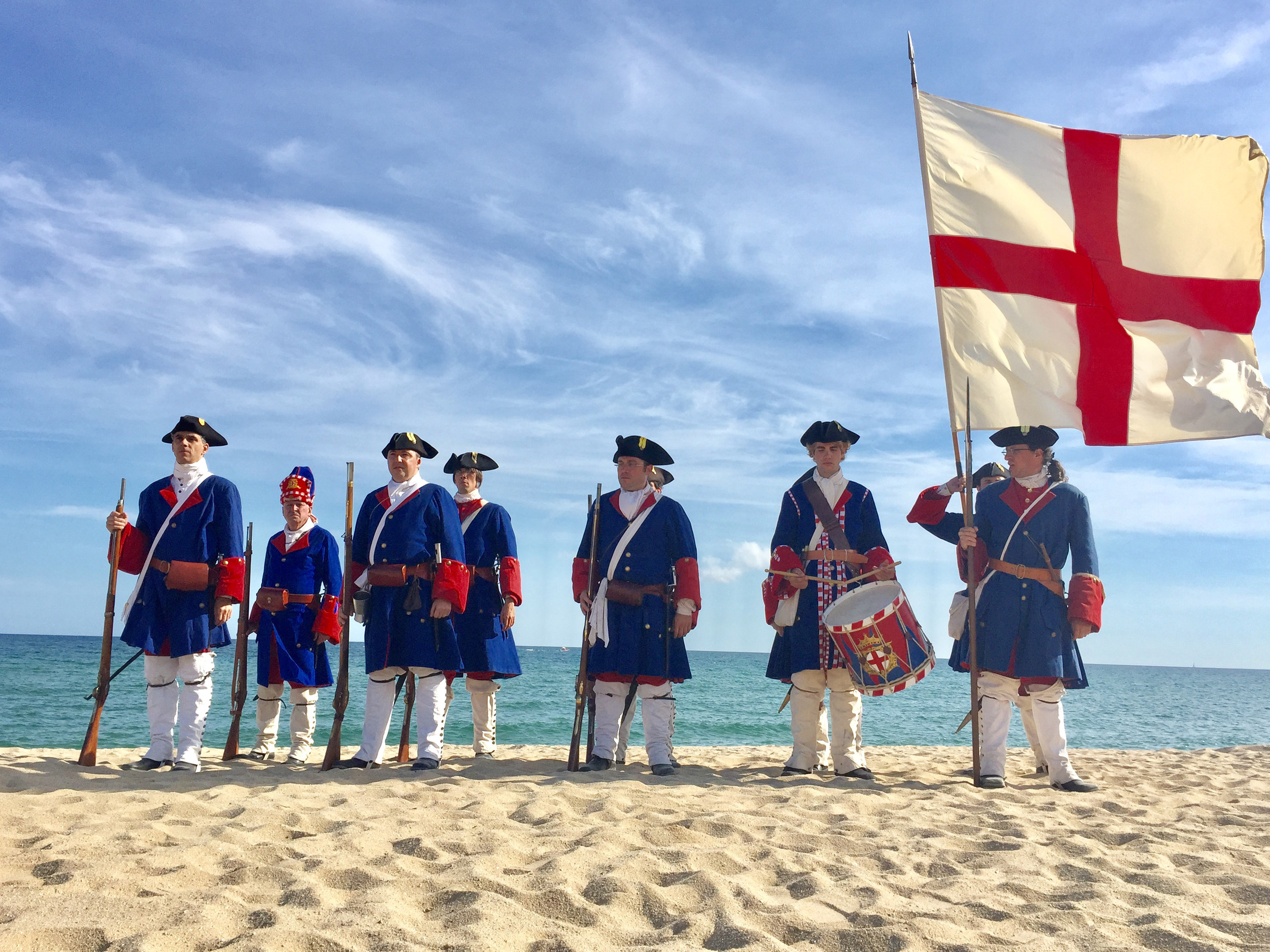
2014 reenactment of the Regiment of the Deputation of the General, part of the Army of Catalonia (1713–14)

The Usage Princeps namque, dating from the 11th century, regulated the defense of the prince and the Principality, and became the basis of the organization of self-defense and paramilitary units throughout Catalan history, materialized in mutual-protection agreements known as Sagramental, while the militia corps was known as Sometent. The feudal system allowed to lordships, institutions and corporations to raise its own armies, as well as to be convened by the king due to feudal agreements, alongside to the vassals and subjects of the other realms, however, there was no standing army. Catalan soldiers played an important role in the expansion of the Crown to Valencia, Majorca and the Mediterranean. The Catalan navy and its Catalan Galleys contributed to expand and secure the hegemony along the sea, while the army invested much of its resources in the conquest of Sardinia and in the War of the Sicilian Vespers. After the last one, most of the Almogavers (light infantry) became mercenaries of the Great Catalan Company created by Roger de Flor in 1303.

Due to the outbreak of the Catalan Civil War (1462–1472), the Council of the Principality of Catalonia organised different military forces to fight against the King John II. The Civil War saw one of the first generalised use of firearms in a military conflict of Western Europe. In the General Court of Caalonia of 1493, King Ferdinand II confirmed the Princeps namque usage.

After the establishment of the Monarchy of Spain in the 16th century, Catalans were found in Habsburg military, however, the Usage Princeps namque and the lack of a large Catalan manpower limited their presence in comparison to the other polities of the Empire. Some cities like Barcelona gained recognition of self-defense and established urban militias, known as the Coronela. While the military conflicts with France arose, many Catalan militias took part in the fight alongside the regular army, as at the siege of Salses, in 1639.

== Society ==
=== Economy ===
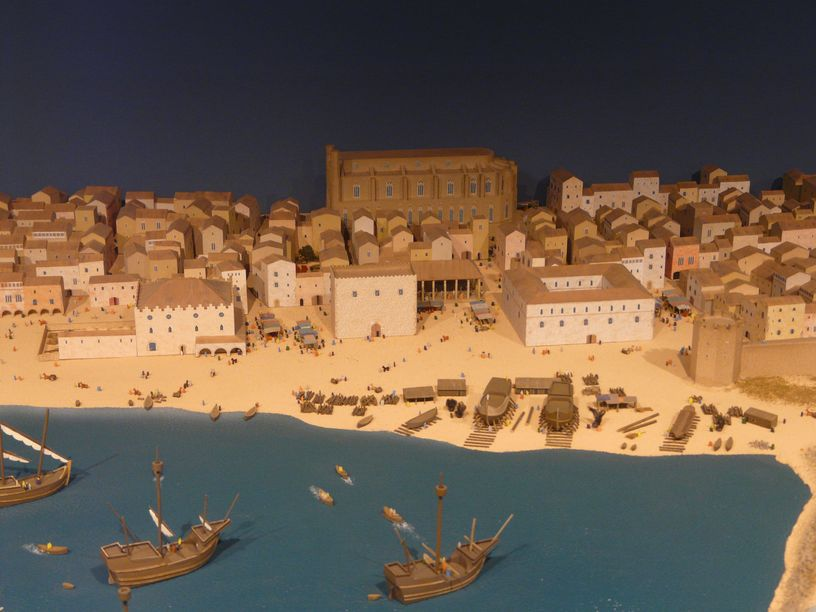
Scale model of Pla de Palau (Barcelona) in the 15th century, then the main entrance and exit point of trade goods from the port

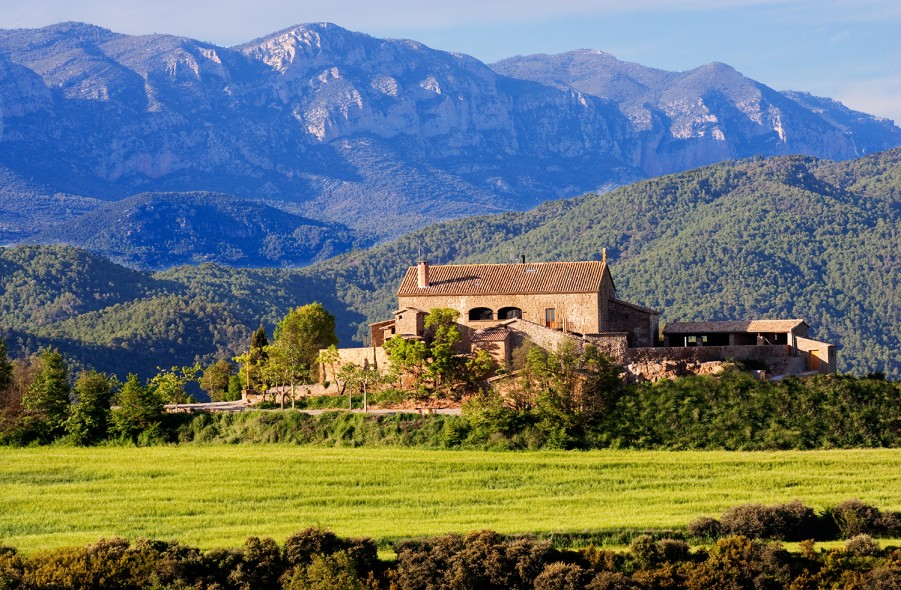
Masia from Heretat de Guàrdia (La Baronia de Rialb). After the Sentencia of Guadalupe, the mas ruled by emphyeutic system became one the basis of prosperity in Catalan countryside

For much of the Late Middle Ages, the Principality of Catalonia was the economic and commercial core of the Crown of Aragon, with Barcelona serving as its main urban, mercantile, and portuary hub. This Catalan economic prominence was particularly evident between the late 13th and mid-14th centuries, as merchants from Barcelona spearheaded the expansion of a dense trade network across Europe and the Mediterranean. Following the conquests of Mallorca and Valencia, a hierarchical division of functions emerged among the cities of Barcelona, Mallorca, and Valencia, with Barcelona leading the group and securing export and import links with distant markets. Mercantile growth was accompanied by developments in manufacturing and shipbuilding; the textile industry (which had been expanding since the 13th century) became the driving force of Catalan economic activity during the 14th and 15th centuries. Commercial expansion was also supported by an extensive consular network: a privilege granted in 1266 gave the municipality of Barcelona the right to appoint overseas consuls, and records document ten Catalan consulates in the eastern Mediterranean, including those in Alexandria, Damascus, Constantinople, Famagusta, and Candia (Heraklion). Between approximately 1330 and 1430, Barcelona established itself as a premier economic center that structured and dominated key sectors of the Mediterranean region, on direct competition with Venice and Genoa.

During the last quarter of the 14th century, a severe fiscal, financial, and monetary crisis occurred, although the Catalan economy maintained a general growth trend (albeit at a slower pace) until the outbreak of the civil war of 1462–1472. Against this backdrop of financial development, the Consell de Cent established the Taula de Canvi of Barcelona in 1401, considered Europe's first public bank. The civil war caused a profound economic rupture, and subsequent recovery efforts failed to restore the region's former strength. In the early 16th century, the implementation of the Arbitration Sentence of Guadalupe fostered the emergence of a prosperous class of land-owning peasants, while agriculture recovered and manufacturing activity began to increase.

Throughout the 16th and 17th centuries, Catalan economy underwent a progressive reorganization. Between the second half of the 16th century and the early 17th century, productive activities became decentralized, and an increasingly integrated urban network took shape, led by Barcelona but with mid-sized cities playing an ever-greater role; concurrently, coastal trade revived and Catalan merchants began their initial forays into Castilian markets. In the second half of the 17th century, growing demand for wine and aguardiente from Northern Europe facilitated Catalonia's integration into Atlantic trade networks, involving Dutch and British merchants, while Barcelona's foreign trade saw significant growth between 1664 and the end of the century. By the late 17th century, some Catalan merchants had also established themselves in Seville and Cádiz to participate in colonial trade within the monopolistic system then in force. By 1700, significant economic transformations oriented towards specialization and trade (both domestic and foreign) with proto-industrial features were already present.

=== Language ===
In grey, Catalan-speaking lands

Catalonia constitutes the original nucleus where Catalan is spoken. The Catalan language shares common traits with the Romance languages of Iberia and Gallo-Romance languages of southern France, it is regarded by a minority of linguists as being an Ibero-Romance language (the group that includes Spanish), and by a majority as a Gallo-Romance language, such as French or Occitan from which Catalan diverged between 11th and 14th centuries.

By the 9th century, Catalan had evolved from Vulgar Latin on both sides of the eastern end of the Pyrenees. From the 8th century, the Catalan counts extended their territory southwards and westwards, conquering territories then occupied by Muslims, bringing their language with them. In the 11th century, feudal documents written in dog Latin begin to show Catalan elements. By the end of the 11th century, documents written completely or mostly in Catalan begin to appear, like the Complaints of Guitard Isarn, Lord of Caboet (ca. 1080–1095), or The Oath of peace and truce of Count Pere Ramon (1098).

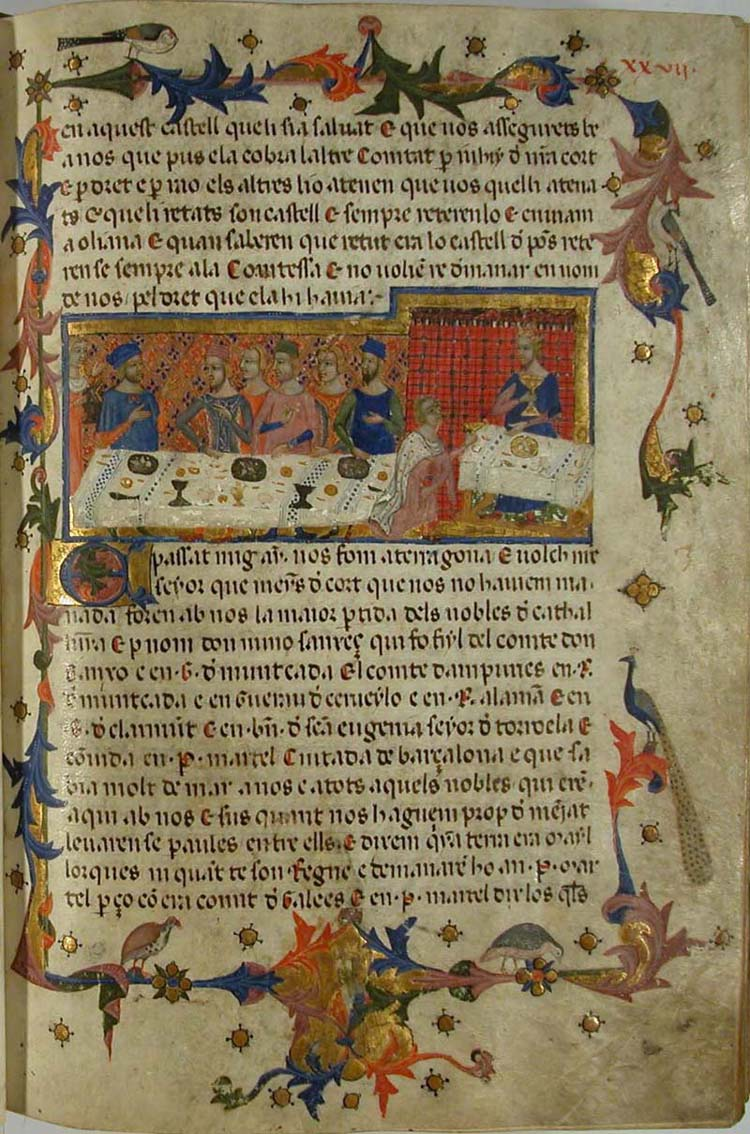
Fragment of the oldest existing copy of the Llibre dels Fets written in the original Catalan, dating from 1343. The scene depicts James I of Aragon with his lords planned the conquest of Majorca (1229)

Catalan experienced a golden age during the Late Middle Ages, reaching a peak of maturity and cultural plenitude, and expanded territorially as more lands were added to the dominions of the Crown of Aragon. Examples of this can be seen in the works of Majorcan Ramon Llull (1232–1315), The Four Great Catalan Chronicles (13th–14th centuries), and the Valencian school of poetry which culminated in Ausiàs March (1397–1459). Catalan became the language of the Kingdom of Majorca, as well the main language of the Kingdom of Valencia, particularly in coastal areas. It was also extended to Sardinia and it was used as an administrative language in Sardinia, Sicily and Athens. Between the 13th and 15th centuries this language was present throughout the Mediterranean world, and it was one of the first basis of the Lingua Franca

The belief that political splendor was correlated with linguistic consolidation was voiced through the Royal Chancery, which promoted a highly standardized language. By the 15th century, the city of Valencia had become the center of social and cultural dynamism. The novel of chivalry Tirant lo Blanc (1490), by Joanot Martorell, shows the transition from medieval to Renaissance values, something than can also be seen in the works of Bernat Metge and Andreu Febrer. During this period, Catalan remained as one of the 'great languages' of medieval Europe. The first book produced with movable type in the Iberian Peninsula was printed in Catalan.

With the union of the crowns of Castille and Aragon (1479), the use of Castilian (Spanish) gradually became more prestigious and marked the start of the relative decline of Catalan. Along the 16th and 17th centuries, Catalan literature came under the influence of Spanish, and the urban and literary classes became largely bilingual. After the defeat of the pro-Habsburg coalition in the War of Spanish Succession (1714) Spanish replaced Catalan in most of legal documentation, becoming the administrative and political language in the Principality of Catalonia and the kingdoms of Valencia and Majorca. While the linguistic replacement solely affected the Royal Audience, the king provided with secret instructions to the new royal officers in Catalonia to further introduce Spanish: they "will take the utmost care to introduce the Castilian [Spanish] language, for which purpose he will give the most temperate and disguised measures so that the effect is achieved, without the effort being noticed."

Today, Catalan is one of the three official languages of autonomous community of Catalonia, as stated in the Catalan Statute of Autonomy; the other two are Spanish, and Occitan in its Aranese variety. Catalan has no official recognition in "Northern Catalonia". Catalan has official status alongside Spanish in the Balearic Islands and in the Land of Valencia (where it is called Valencian), as well as Algherese Catalan alongside Italian in the city of Alghero and in Andorra as the sole official language.

== Symbols ==
As a state of royal sovereignty, the Principality Catalonia, like the other political entities of the period, did not have its own flag or coat of arms in the modern, national sense. However, a variety of royal and other symbols were used in order to identify the Principality and its institutions.

The coat of arms and flag of the Principality of Catalonia, originally the royal arms of the king of Aragon. The Senyera is one of the oldest flags in Europe to be used in present-day (but not in continuous use). There are several theories advocating either a Catalan or Aragonese origin for the symbol, appearing for the first time in a seal of Ramon Berenguer IV, Count of Barcelona and Prince of Aragon, dating from 1150. While remained the monarch's personal emblem, from the late 14th century onwards it began to be territorialized to represent individually the states of the Crown of Aragon, particularly on the Principality.
St George Cross (Catalan: Creu de Sant Jordi) as ensign of the Deputation of the General or Generalitat of Catalonia. The flag was mostly used by the army of the Generalitat. The legend of Saint George and the dragon emerged in the 11th century and spreading throughout Catalonia in the 13th century, then the saint was adopted by the kings of Aragon as their protector. In 1456 the Catalan Court appointed Saint George as the patron saint of the Principality of Catalonia.
Flag of Barcelona, capital of the Principality, which appeared for the first time in 1329. In 1335, King Peter III (IV of Aragon) "the Ceremonious" gave permission to the Consell de Cent to use his royal sign (the four bars). Although in 1344 the four bars had already been fixed by decree, the number fluctuated for a long time between four and two. It was replaced during early modern era by the Saint Eulalia's flag. It also appears in some maps as the flag that identified the Principality.
Saint Eulalia's flag, it is represented the figure of Saint Eulalia of Barcelona (city’s patroness) through a saltire, accompanied by the arms of the City and of the chapter of the cathedral over a crimson background. It became Barcelona's flag in 1588, leading the representation of the Consell de Cent at civic and religious events and celebrations (processions, royal entries, etc.). At the same time, it served as the city's war standard. It was the famous standard carried by Rafael Casanova (Chief Councillor of Barcelona) when he was wounded during the last stand in the defense of Barcelona on September 11, 1714.

== See also ==
- List of presidents of the Generalitat de Catalunya
- List of viceroys of Catalonia
- Royal Archives of Barcelona
- Palau Reial Major
- Catalan Countries
- List of Catalans
- Catalan independence movement

== Bibliography ==
- Baydal, Vicent; Palomo, Cristian (coord.) (2020). Pseudohistòria contra Catalunya. De l'espanyolisme a la Nova Història. Vic: Ed. Eumo. ISBN 978-84-9766-689-3.
- Bisson, Thomas N. (1986). The Medieval Crown of Aragon: a short history. Oxford: Clarendon Press. ISBN 9780198219873.
- Bonnassie, Pierre (1975–1976). La Catalogne du milieu du Xe à la fin du XIe siècle. Croissance et mutations d'une société. Toulouse: Publications de l'Université de Toulouse-Le Mirail.
- Capdeferro, Josep and Serra, Eva (2014). La defensa de les constitucions de Catalunya: el Tribunal de Contrafaccions (1702–1713). Generalitat de Catalunya. Departament de Justícia ISBN 978-84-393-9203-3
- Chaytor, H. J. (1933). A History of Aragon and Catalonia. London: Methuen. ISBN 9780404014797.
- Cingolani, Stefano Maria (2006). "Seguir les Vestígies dels Antecessors. Llinatge, Reialesa i Historiografia a Catalunya des de Ramon Berenguer IV a Pere II (1131–1285)". Anuario de Estudios Medievales. ISSN 0066-5061
- Cingolani, Stefano Maria (2015). La formació nacional de Catalunya i el fet identitari dels catalans (785–1410). Barcelona: Generalitat de Catalunya. ISBN 9788439392590.
- Costa Carreras, Joan; Yates, Alan (2009). The Architect of Modern Catalan: Selected Writings/Pompeu Fabra (1868–1948). Instutut d'Estudis Catalans & Universitat Pompeu Fabra & Jonh Benjamins B.V. pp. 6–7. ISBN 978-90-272-3264-9.
- Elliott, John (1963). The revolt of the Catalans: a study in the decline of Spain (1598–1640). Cambridge: Cambridge University Press. ISBN 0-521-27890-2.
- Elliott, John (2002) [1963]. Imperial Spain 1469–1716 (Revised repr. ed.). London: Penguin Books. ISBN 978-0141007038.
- Ferro, Víctor (1987). El Dret Públic Català. Les Institucions a Catalunya fins al Decret de Nova Planta. Vic: Ed. Eumo. ISBN 84-7602-203-4.
- Fontana, Josep (2014). La formació d'una identitat. Una història de Catalunya. Ed. Eumo. ISBN 9788497665261.
- Kagay, Donald J. (1994). The Usatges of Barcelona: The fundamental law of Catalonia. US: University of Pennsylvania Press. ISBN 0-8122-1535-4.
- Miller, William (1908). The Latins in the Levant, a History of Frankish Greece (1204–1566). New York: E. P. Dutton and Co. OCLC 563022439.
- Morales Roca, Francisco José (1983). Próceres habilitados en las Cortes del Principado de Cataluña, siglo XVII (1599–1713). Ediciones Hidalguia. ISBN 9788400054311.
- Ryder, Alan (2007). The Wreck of Catalonia: Civil War in the Fifteenth Century. Oxford: Oxford University Press. ISBN 978-0199207367.
- Sabaté, Flocel (1997). El territori de la Catalunya medieval: percepció de l'espai i divisió territorial al llarg de l'edat mitjana. Barcelona: Rafael Dalmau. ISBN 9788423205134.
- Salrach, Josep Maria (dir.) (2017). Naixement de la nació catalana. Orígens i expansió. Segles IX–XIV. Barcelona: Enciclopèdia Catalana. ISBN 9788441231061.
- Sánchez, Isabel (2004). La Diputació del General de Catalunya (1413–1479). Barcelona: Institut d'Estudis Catalans. ISBN 9788472837508.
- Serra, Eva (2018). La Formació de la Catalunya Moderna. 1640–1714. Vic: Ed. Eumo. ISBN 978-8497666435.
- Sesma Muñoz, José Ángel (2000). La Corona de Aragón. Una introducción crítica. Zaragoza: Caja de la Inmaculada. ISBN 84-95306-80-8.
- Setton, Kenneth M. (1975). "The Catalans in Greece, 1311–1388". In Hazard, Harry W. (ed.). A History of the Crusades, Volume III: The Fourteenth and Fifteenth Centuries. Madison, Wisconsin: University of Wisconsin Press. ISBN 978-0-299-06670-3.
- Tejada y Spínola, Francisco Elías de (1950). Las doctrinas políticas en la Cataluña Medieval. Barcelona: Aymà.
- Torres i Sans, Xavier (2008). Naciones sin nacionalismo. Cataluña en la monarquía hispánica. Valencia: Publicacions de la Universitat de València ISBN 978-84-370-7263-0
- Vilar, Pierre (1962). La Catalogne dans l'Espagne moderne. Recherches sur les fondements économiques des structures nationales. III vols., Paris
- Serrano Daura, Josep (2024). Leyes históricas de Cataluña. Vol. I. Leyes Históricas de España. Madrid: Agencia Estatal Boletín Oficial del Estado. ISBN 978-84-340-2971-2.
- Albareda, Joaquim (30 November 2021). "El pactismo catalán y la construcción del Estado (1652-1714)". Cuadernos de Historia de España (88): 55–83. doi:10.34096/che.n88.10943.
- Montagut Estragués, Tomàs de; Ripoll Sastre, Pere (2022). "El pactisme a Catalunya: una concepció dual de la comunitat política". Revista de Dret Històric Català (20): 189–210. doi:10.2436/20.3004.01.136.
- Palomo Reina, Cristian (2020a). "Comtat de Barcelona i Principat de Catalunya. Sobre l'ús historiogràfic anòmal del vocabulari políticojurídic històric". Revista de Dret Històric Català (19): 125–144. doi:10.2436/3004.01.129.
- Casado Alonso, Hilario (2002). Historia económica de España: siglos X-XX. Barcelona: Crítica. ISBN 84-8432-366-8.
- Gracia Retortillo, Ricard (2008). La vegueria com a govern local intermedi a Catalunya. Encaix constitucional de la seva regulació estatutària. Barcelona: Generalitat de Catalunya: Institut d'Estudis Autonòmics. ISBN 978-84-393-7935-5.
