= Saint Eulalia's flag =

Flag of Saint Eulalia
- Adopted: 1588
- Design: Crimson damask, Saint Eulalia with a cross in the center and flanked by the coats of arms of Barcelona and Barcelona Cathedral.

Saint Eulalia’s flag or pennon is the historical flag of Barcelona and one of its main symbols. Over a maroon background it is represented the figure of the city’s patron through a saltire, its main attribute. Early twentieth Century, the flag was held on City Council balcony every February 12, Saint Eulalia of Barcelona’s Day.

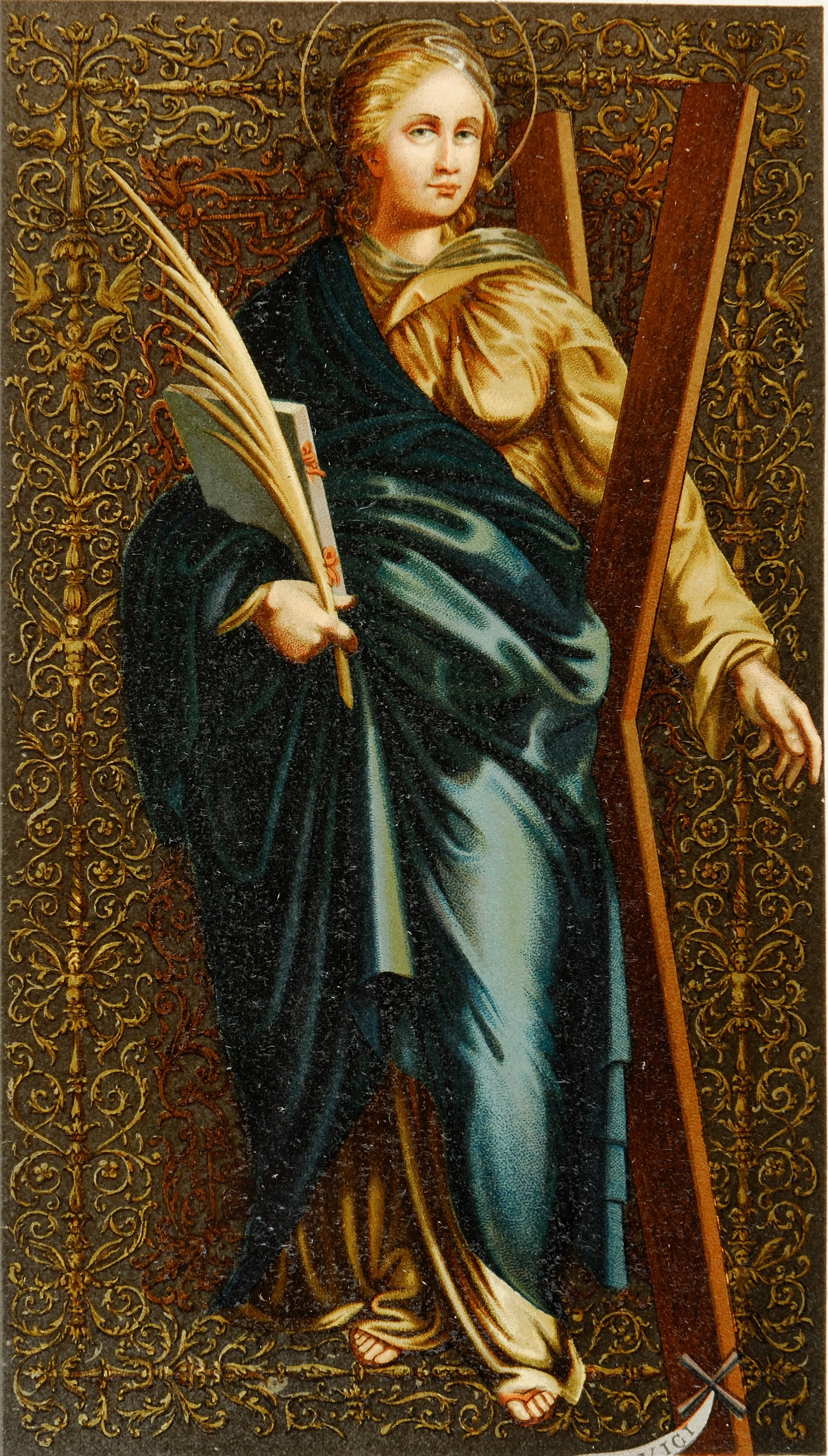
Saint Eulalia's Flag

There are two versions of the same emblem: The pennon and the flag. The pennon is lighter, is the ancient military standard. On the other hand, the flag is bigger and it had a ceremonial use. Saint Eulalia’s flag has an important historical meaning because it waved in City Council balcony in 1713 when the Council decided to resist. It was also the standard held by Rafael de Casanova when he was hurt in the last attack for the city defence, 11 September 1714.

The ensign, usually allocated in Tercentenary room of the City House, was shown in solemn acts, both lay and religious, as well as in the calls to citizens to defend the city against foreign enemies.
