= Sagramental =

The Sagramental (Catalan: literally Sacramental) was a type of paramilitary organization native from the Principality of Catalonia, appearing in the Middle Ages. They were mutual-protection agreements, made under oath and thus called "sacramental."

Though they were institutionalised during the reign of James I, they had already been legislated in writing during the 11th century. In Catalonia, the text Princeps namque' established the requirement that every man participate in the national defense in the event of external threat.

The participants were summoned, in times of peril, by bonfires lit on hilltops (similar to the Spanish Huestes), or by the sound of the horn, trumpet, or bells. By the 16th century, other forms of defense began to overtake the Sagramental.

== Historical examples ==
- The first Sagramental was raised in 1257 by the peoples of Llobregat
- In 1314, Jaume II created the Sagramental del Vallès
- In 1395 the Sagramentals of Moià and Maresme were added to the lists
