= Sometent =

Catalan community militia

The Sometent (in Catalan; in Spanish: somatén) was a militia institution from Catalonia. In its beginnings it was an armed corps of civilian protection, separated from the army, for self-defense and defense of the local territory. It thus contrasted with the other Spanish militia, the miquelets, irregular troops that could also be sent to fight outside their territory.

The dictatorship of Primo de Rivera (1923–1930) extended the somatén to all of Spain, making it one of the pillars of the regime. It was dissolved in 1931 by the Second Spanish Republic, except for the Catalan rural Sometent, and reestablished under Franco's dictatorship. The definitive abolition took place in 1978 after the reestablishment of democracy. The name sometent literally means making noise.

== History ==
=== Middle Ages ===
Its beginnings come from the sagramental, whose origins are found in the compilations made by the Comital Court (Catalan: Cort Comtal, lit. 'County Court') of Barcelona, in 1068 and in a usatge ('feudal usage') called Princeps namque. Both legal texts define the police (at the local level) and military (at the general level) character conferred to the sometent.

Another of the tasks of the sometent was to raise the alarm for the neighboring villages. This was done by means of bonfires lit from summit to summit, the sound of a horn, a trumpet blast or the ringing of bells. This last method, the ringing of bells (or so emetent, in Catalan) is the origin of the later name, which prevailed over the name sagramental from the 16th century onwards. The members of the sometent were all the neighbors in conditions to render such service. They had the obligation to keep weapons in their houses and to be instructed periodically in their handling.

According to Jaume Vicens Vives, in the medieval sometent "when the king or his officials thought it convenient and necessary, the royal people of a certain district or vegueria were summoned to come with arms in defense of their lord. The monarch had the right to claim this armed assistance, a right that derived from the ancient formulas of patronage".

=== Modern Age ===
The mass mobilization of citizens was called general sometent and reached its peak during the 12th and 13th centuries. During the following two centuries it was still frequent. In the 16th and 17th centuries it acquired a fundamentally police role —against bandits, Huguenots and pirates— defined by the Catalan Constitution of 1561, effective until the middle of the 17th century.

Following the defeat of the Catalan supporters of Archduke Charles in the War of the Spanish Succession (1714), Philip V promulgated the Nueva Planta decrees, one of the effects of which was the suppression of the sometent, led by General Moragues during the war. Despite this temporary suppression, the sometent was reestablished in 1794 by the Count of the Union during the Roussillon War (1793-1795), mainly due to the poor situation of the army. It was used again during the Spanish War of Independence (1808-1814), against the French in Roses, Barcelona and Tarragona.

=== 19th and early 20th century ===
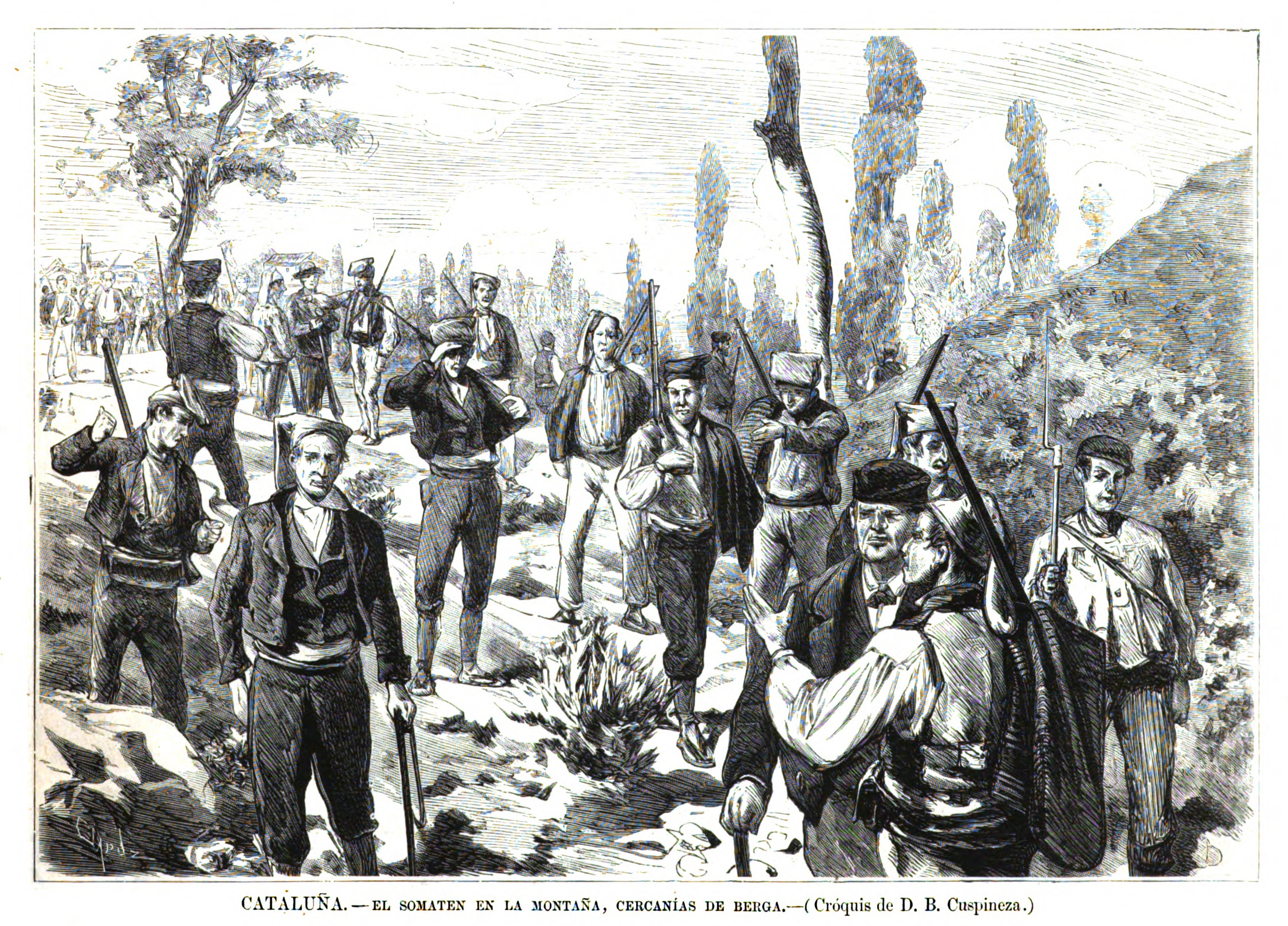
Sometent in 1875 near Berga during the Third Carlist War

It was reconstituted in 1855 by the large rural landowners, under the name Sometent Armat de la Muntanya de Catalunya and adopted the motto Pau, pau i sempre pau (in English: "peace, peace and always peace"). From then on, the sometent acquired the character of an auxiliary body of public order in rural areas, destined to protect the domains of large landowners. It was abolished again in the First Republic, but was reestablished shortly after to fight the Carlists in the Third Carlist War.

The Bases de Manresa reserved to the sometent an important task, which was not carried out because the Bases were not applied.

Subsequently, the sometent acted in collaboration with the authorities and ultra-right-wing groups on several occasions. Thus, for example, they collaborated in the arrest of Francisco Ferrer Guardia (1909), accused of complicity in the attack of the anarchist Mateo Morral against Alfonso XIII, and against the strikers in Alella, in the years prior to the military dictatorship of Primo de Rivera. The popular support of the sometent was scarce, due to its repressive activity and favored treatment of the upper classes, and a whole black legend grew up around it. On March 25, 1919, Joaquín Milans del Bosch decreed that any civilian who did not belong to the Sometent and who carried arms would be guilty of military rebellion.

=== Extension of the Somatén to all of Spain under the dictatorship of Primo de Rivera ===
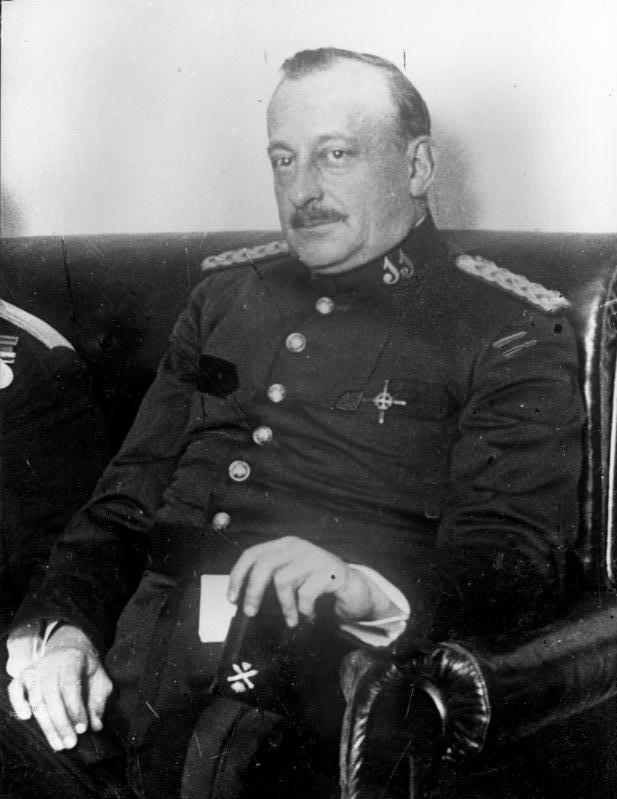
General Miguel Primo de Rivera. During his dictatorship (1923-1930) he extended the Somatén to all of Spain.

On September 17, 1923, only two days after the triumph of the coup d'état that established the dictatorship of Primo de Rivera, the Militar Directory issued a royal decree extending the Catalan institution of the Sometent (referred in Spanish as Somatén) to all the provinces of Spain. According to the royal decree, the Somatén Nacional, which was the first official name it received, would be recruited within a month by the captains general, under the command of a brigadier general. In the Decree, Primo de Rivera explained that the Somatén was not only an auxiliary force for the maintenance of public order but also a "spur of the spirits" to stimulate citizen collaboration with the new regime. In spite of the fact that Primo de Rivera in a speech pronounced before Mussolini on November 21, 1923, pretended to equate it with the Fascist "black shirts", the Somatén "was an armed corps of bourgeois of order, created from, by and for the power", although some workers from the Sindicatos Libres were also integrated into it. As Primo de Rivera said, the Somatén "has as its motto peace, justice and order, which are the three postulates of true democracy".

According to the royal decree, the Somatén was open to men over 23 years of age of proven morality. Its structure and mission –initially, the model of the Catalan Somatén was copied– were established by a Royal Order of the Ministry of War of June 13, 1924 on the Organic Regulations for the Corps of Armed Somatenes of Spain, and in successive decrees the legal privileges of the agents of authority were extended to its members, even when they were off duty. Thus the Somatenes "achieved a practical exemption from civil or criminal liability for events that occurred during the fulfillment of their missions," concludes historian Eduardo Gonzalez Calleja.

To promote enlistment and encourage social support for the institution, innumerable civic acts were organized, the rites of which González Calleja describes as follows: "popular reception of the military representative of the Directory (civil or military governor or government delegate); a review of the local Somatén; a campaign mass officiated by the bishop or the parish priest in the main square with the attendance of the garrison forces, if any, of the personalities of the town and the region (mayor, secretary, town councilors, teachers, doctors, etc.), and even of the youth organizations of the town and of the region (mayor, secretary, councilors, teachers, doctors, etc.), and even of the youth organizations of the region such as the Exploradores de España; speeches by the godmother of the Somatén, the corporal of the district and the concurrent civil or military authority; blessing of the flags of the Institution; parade of the Somatén (care was taken to avoid excessive identification with military customs, discouraging the execution of any step rhythm or the uniform holding of the long weapon, and prohibiting the use of bugle and drum bands), and civic banquet in the City Hall, in a public hall or in the home of a prominent neighbor, often a close relative of the godmother".

The Somatén Nacional had a notable role in the "police of good manners", taking care of establishing a certain conservative bourgeois civic behavior, with a strong religious component. One of its competences as an agent of authority was to persecute blasphemy, and some bishops, such as the Bishop of Pamplona, Mateo Múgica, encouraged his parishioners and the priests of his dioceses to collaborate with the Somatén. In fact, it was placed under the invocation of the Virgin of Montserrat, who was already the patron saint of the Catalan Somatén, and in its "civic acts" the campaign mass was never absent.

In practice, it is possible to differentiate between the rural Somatén, directed to the repression of common crimes, such as thefts, and the urban Somatén that acted under the tutelage of the Army and the Police in the repression of the so-called "social crimes", such as strikes.

On the other hand, joining the Somatén —and also the Unión Patriótica, the only party of the Dictatorship— became an important starting point for political advancement in the regime or for the defense of certain interests, and also for the maintenance of acquired positions, so that many caciques of the old political parties of the time also enlisted, giving rise, according to González Calleja, to the formation of armed groups at the service of the big landowners, which undermined the social valuation of the Somatén.

The number of Somatén members varied throughout the dictatorship. A few months after its foundation it had about 175,000 men, which increased to 182,000 at the end of 1925. It reached its maximum in August 1928 with 217,584, and from then on it began a gradual decline, due to the fact that it lost much of its purpose in improving public order and that it failed to take root outside of Catalonia; "the caciquesque springs of local power prevented the independent development of a civic and truly apolitical organization for protection", affirms González Calleja. Another reason for its decline was the cold reception it received from the popular classes due to its bourgeois component, since it was made up almost exclusively of "respectable people" (merchants, industrialists, lawyers, doctors, engineers, landowners, etc.).

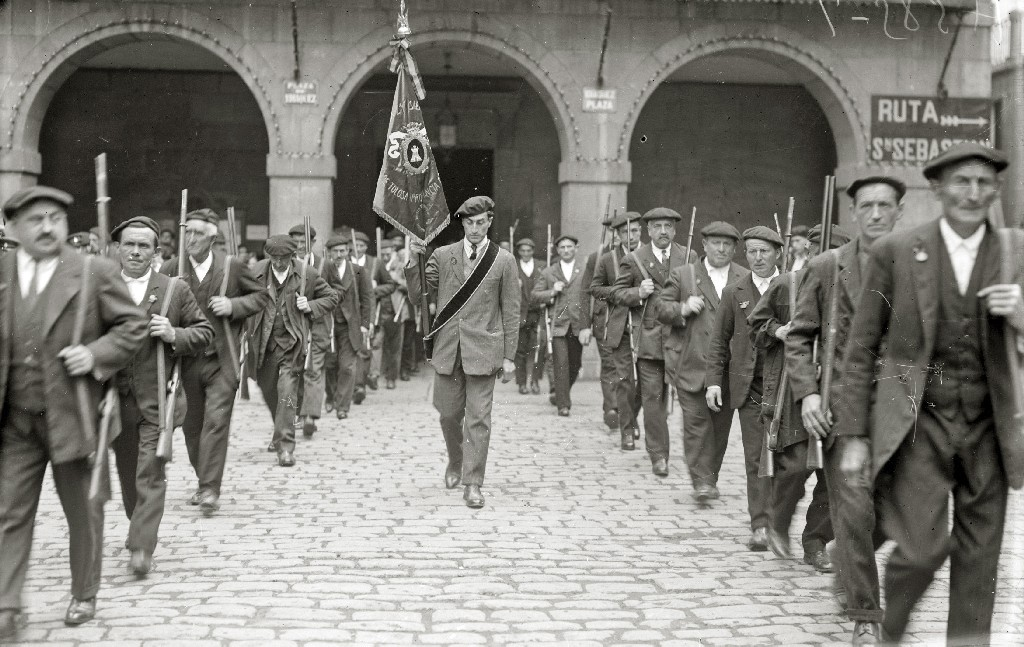
Somatenes leaving the Town Hall of Tolosa in 1927 during the dictatorship of Primo de Rivera.

Thus the Somatén progressively became "a simple choreographic adornment of the regime's pomp and ceremony, parading with their badges, weapons and flags in every celebration or official commemoration that required their presence", states González Calleja. However, Primo de Rivera, only two and a half weeks before presenting his resignation, continued to believe in the validity of the Somatén when in an act with Somatenistas held in Madrid on January 12, 1930, he assured:

The Somatén and the Unión Patriótica are perfectly organized and have such a force of cohesion, such a decision to act nobly and civically, that I no longer believe that with the existence of these entities the days of turbulence, unrest and anxiety, such as those we have all known, can return to Spain.

After the fall of the dictatorship of Primo de Rivera and the end of censorship, a good part of the press denounced the excesses, and even the crimes committed by its members, and demanded its dissolution. This took place, except for rural Catalonia, by an order of the Provisional Government of the Second Spanish Republic issued on April 15, 1931, only one day after the proclamation of the Second Spanish Republic.

=== Second Republic, civil war and Franco's dictatorship ===
On April 15, 1931, it was dissolved, except in Catalonia, by the Government of the Second Republic, although it was reestablished in 1936 after the uprising that originated the Civil War. After the Civil War, in 1939, the Sometent was dissolved again, but not for long, since in 1945 Franco's government reorganized it, now extended to almost all the Spanish territory, under the name of "Somatén Armado", with the main purpose of collaborating with the Guardia Civil in combating the maquis and the clandestine workers' organizations. The members of the somatén, who had their rifles assigned in the Civil Guard posts and a short weapon license (very limited in Spain), could not act alone, but they could remain in charge of the Guardia Civil barracks if it was necessary for all the guards to go to an emergency, go on duty forming a pair with a guard, etc.

It was disbanded by the Government in 1978.

== Sometent in Andorra ==
Into the 21st century, the Sometent is only recognized in Andorra as an official institution, although it only comes into service during national emergencies such as during the floods of 1982 or in official acts such as the visit of the president of the French Republic and the bishop of Urgell as Co-Princes of Andorra, with all male Andorrans over 18 years of age being called to the levée. However, it has no other major use or permanence, since internal security is the responsibility of the Andorran police and, in case of violation or threat to the sovereignty, independence or integrity of the Andorran territory, of Spain and France.

== See also ==
- Mossos d'Esquadra
- Ertzaintza
- Far-right terrorism in Spain

== Bibliography ==
- Barrio Alonso, Ángeles (2004). La modernización de España (1917-1939). Política y sociedad (in Spanish). Madrid: Síntesis. ISBN 84-9756-223-2.
- González Calleja, Eduardo (2005). La España de Primo de Rivera. La modernización autoritaria 1923-1930 (in Spanish). Madrid: Alianza Editorial. ISBN 84-206-4724-1.
