= Citadel of Barcelona =

Demolished citadel in Spain

Coordinates: 41°23′17″N 2°11′15″E

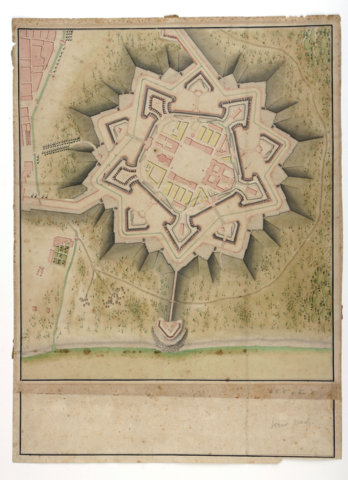
18th-century plan of the Citadel (published in Arxiu Històric de la Ciutat de Barcelona)

The Citadel of Barcelona (in Spanish, Ciudadela de Barcelona; in Catalan, Fortalesa de la Ciutadella) was a bastion fort citadel built in Barcelona. The works commenced in 1714 and, at the time of its construction, it was the largest fortress in Europe, capable of housing 8,000 troops.

It was designed by the military engineer Marquis of Verboom, who would also, in 1718, be appointed the Citadel's first governor.

Although its fortifications were dismantled in the mid-19th century, some of its original buildings still remain, including its arsenal, today the Palau del Parlament de Catalunya, the seat of the Catalan Parliament. The rest of the site was converted into the city's main central park, the Parc de la Ciutadella, by the architect Josep Fontserè in 1872.

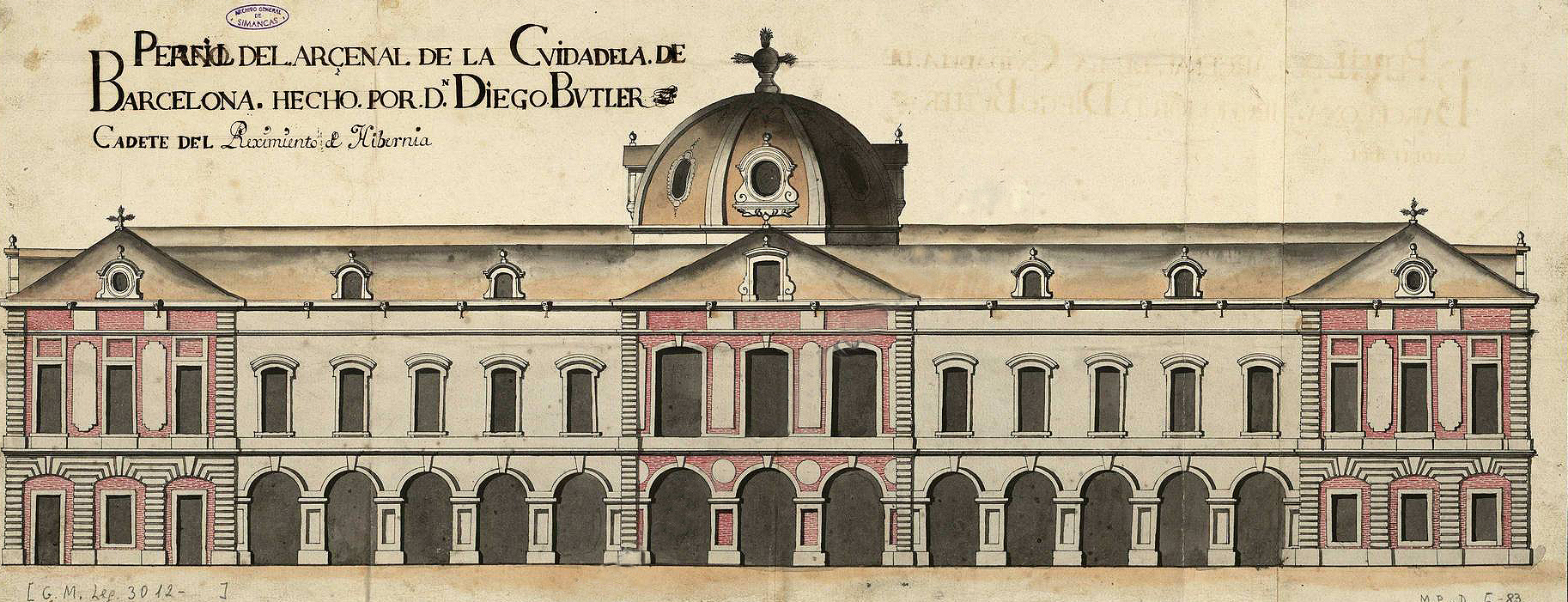
The Arsenal of the fortress of Ciutadella in Barcelona, in 1725. Drawing by Diego Butler, cadet of the Regiment of Hibernia (Archives of the Ministry of Culture, Spain)

== Background ==
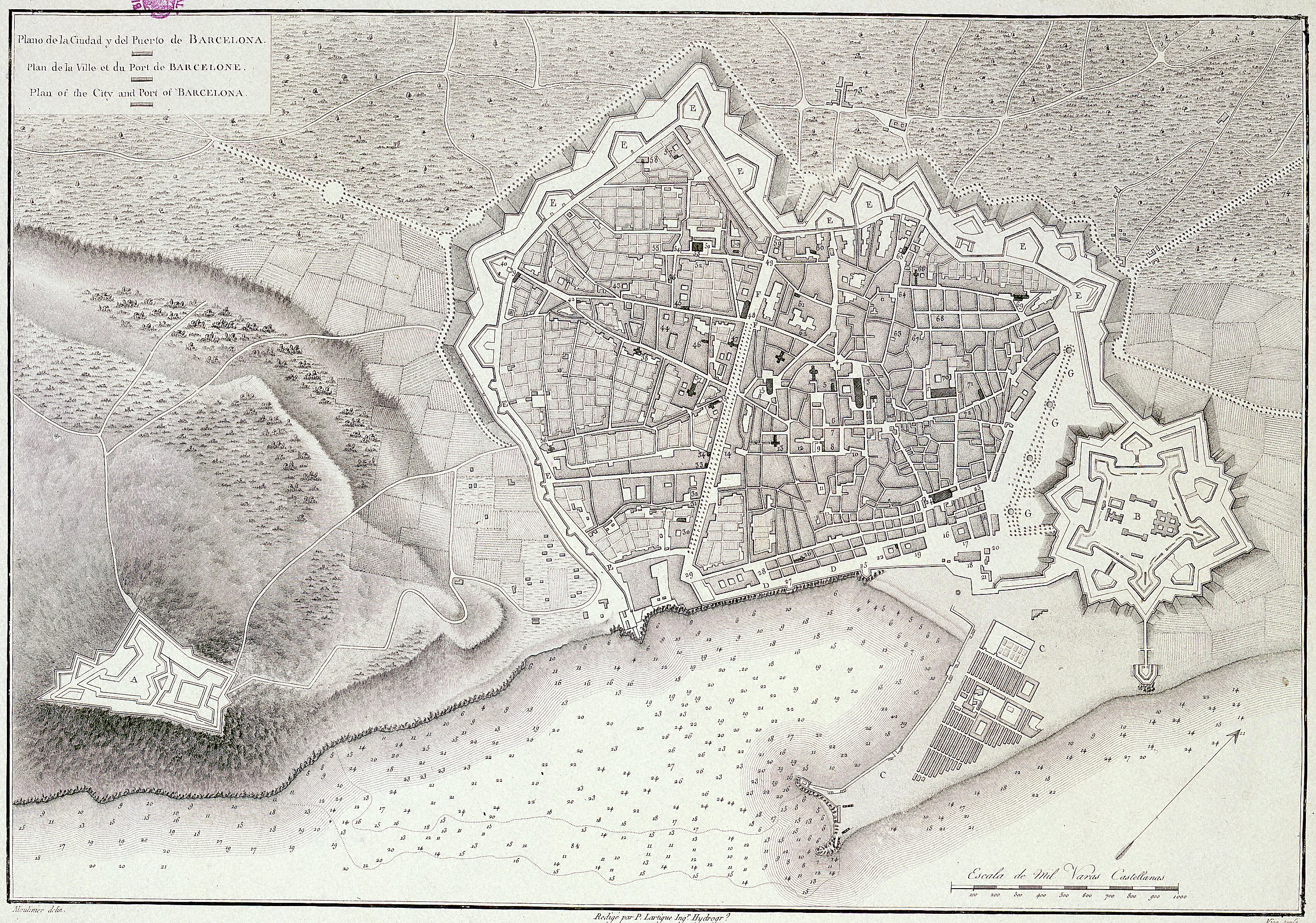
Plan of Barcelona (c. 1806) showing the city in the centre, flanked by the Citadel to the right and Montjuïc Castle to the left. Published in Voyage de l'Espagne by Alexandre de Laborde. Paris, 1806–1820.

The city of Barcelona is flanked on its southwestern edge by the hill from which Montjuïc Castle takes its name. During the Catalan Revolt (1640), the Catalans repelled the forces sent from Madrid at the Battle of Montjuïc (1641). However, during the War of the Spanish Succession (1701–1715), Barcelona was bombarded from the castle in 1705 and again in 1714, when it was besieged for 13 months by the army of the Bourbon King Philip V of Spain. The city eventually fell, and in order to maintain control over it, and to prevent the Catalans from rebelling as they had in the previous century, Philip V ordered the citadel of Barcelona be built on the other side of the city from Montjuïc Castle.

=== Construction ===
The Citadel was constructed in the district of La Ribera, half of which was knocked down to obtain the necessary space, leaving its inhabitants homeless.

In 1718, the captain general of Catalonia, Francesco Pio di Savoia, Marquis of Castel-Rodrigo, commissioned Verboom to design a new neighbourhood for the inhabitants who had lost their houses. However, Verboom's plans were never carried out.

==== Barceloneta ====
In 1749, the captain general of Catalonia, Jaime de Guzmán-Dávalos y Spínola, 2nd Marquis de la Mina, commissioned Juan Martín Cermeño to build the Barceloneta, a quarter that was rebuilt around the fortress, in the Ciutat Vella (Old City). The project aimed to solve several issues, among which that of providing a solution for the inhabitants who had lost their homes in la Ribera was only mentioned as a secondary consideration.

The works commenced in 1753 and included the construction of the Church of Sant Miquel del Port, completed in 1755. By 1757, 244 houses had been built. Two years later, the number of houses built had reached 329, for 1,570 inhabitants.

== History ==
=== Siege of Barcelona (1713–1714) ===
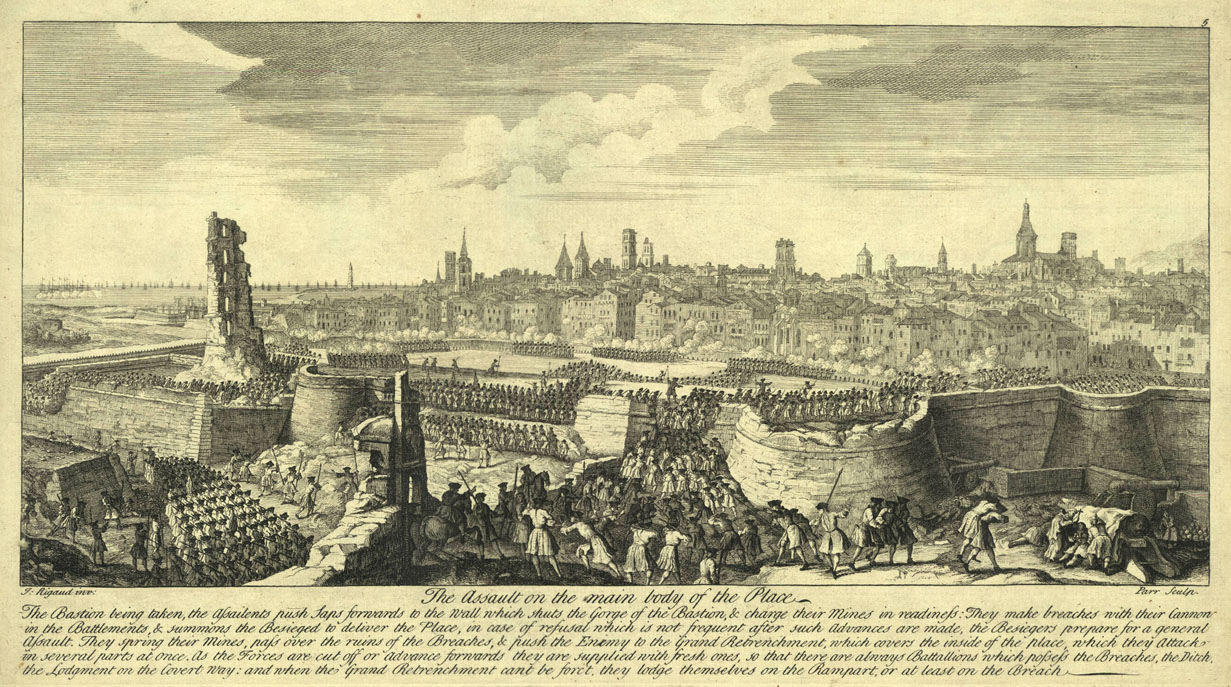
The assault on the main body of the place (1714). Jacques Rigaud (1680–1754). Institut Cartogràfic de Catalunya.

The siege, part of the War of the Catalans, one of the last military campaigns of the War of the Spanish Succession, lasted from July 1713 to September 1714, with the city surrounded by Bourbon forces under the command of Restaino Cantelmo-Stuart, Duke of Popoli.

Reinforcements for the Bourbons, under the command of Duke of Berwick, arrived in April–May 1714 and began the systematic bombardment of the city. With the wall breached in several places and the Conseller en cap and chief commander of the Coronela (the urban militia of Barcelona), Rafael Casanova, wounded, fighting in the streets ensued, led by Antoni de Villarroel, the general commander of the Army of Catalonia. Barcelona surrendered on 11 September 1714, commemorated as the Diada, the National Day of Catalonia.

=== Peninsular War ===
On 10 February 1808, General Duhesme entered Spain at the head of 14,000 men, half French, half Italians, and marched down towards Barcelona. On 29 February, General Lecchi, the officer commanding the French troops passing through Barcelona, marched his division through the city to the gate of the citadel and suddenly entered the fortress, before the Spanish garrison understood what was happening and, without a fight, evicted the Spanish troops. Later that year, the city underwent the blockade of Barcelona, from August to December 1808.

=== Mid-19th century ===
Although, by 1841, the city's authorities had already decided to destroy the fortress, which was hated by Barcelona's citizens, the citadel was restored two years later under the regime of Maria Cristina. In 1842, General Espartero ordered the Bombardment of Barcelona, which razed many of the buildings within the fortress as well as its walls. By 1869, with the political climate liberalised enough to permit it, General Prim decided to turn over what was left of the fortress to the city and some of the remaining buildings were demolished.

== See also ==
- Timeline of the Peninsular War
