= National Day of Catalonia =

Catalan national day

National Day of Catalonia Catalan: Diada Nacional de Catalunya
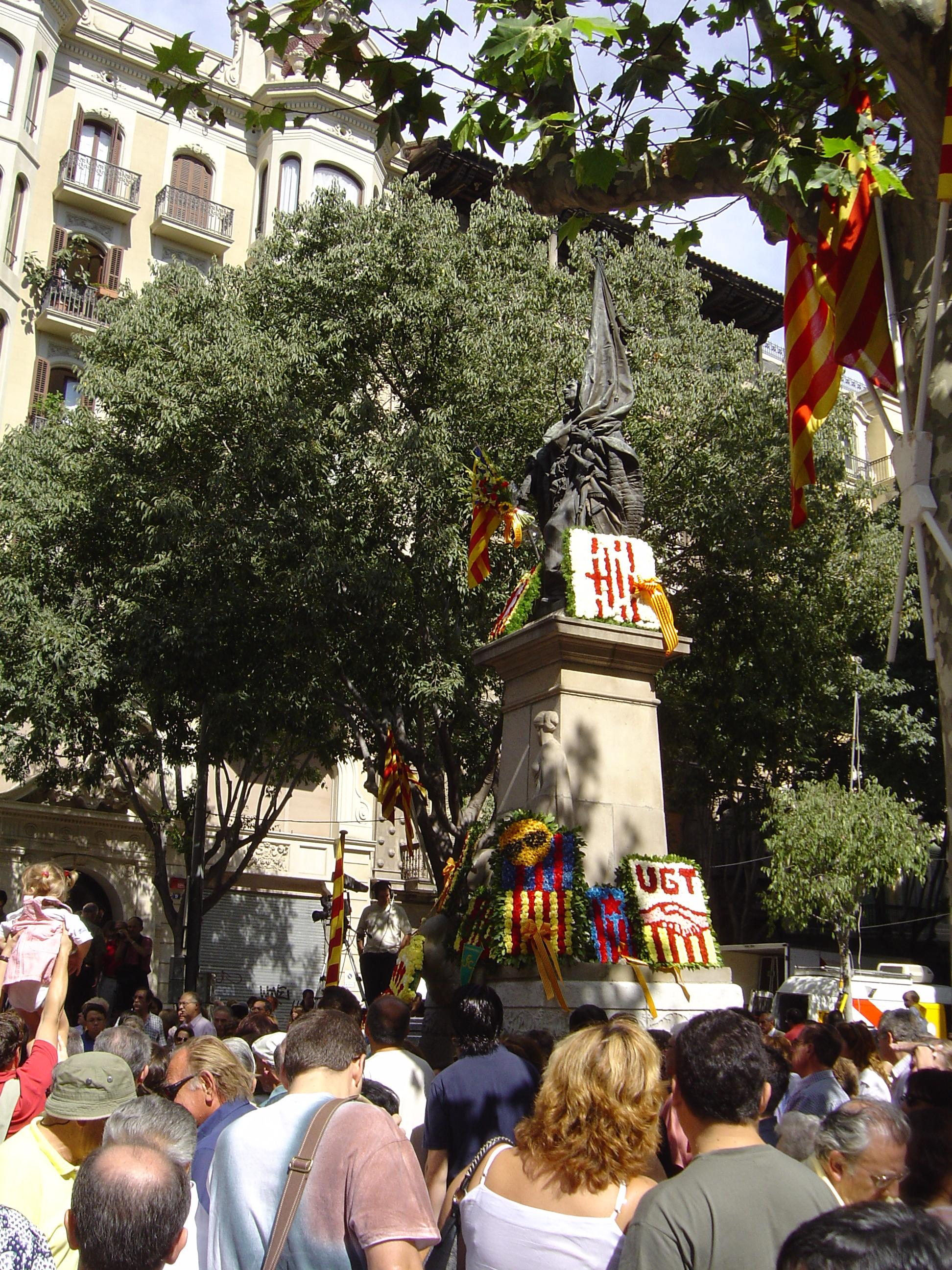
- Floral offerings at the monument to Rafael Casanova on Barcelona's Ronda de Sant Pere, 2005. Casanova was one of the Catalan commanders during the Siege of Barcelona.
- Official name: Diada Nacional de Catalunya
- Also called: Diada, Onze de Setembre
- Observed by: Catalonia (Spain)
- Type: National day
- Significance: Commemorates the last stand of the defense of Barcelona during the War of the Spanish Succession in 1714.
- Celebrations: Flag hoisting, floral offerings, singing patriotic songs, speeches, pro-independence demonstrations, entertainment and cultural events
- Date: 11 September
- Next time: 11 September 2027
- Frequency: annual

The National Day of Catalonia (Catalan: Diada Nacional de Catalunya [diˈaðə nəsi.uˈnal də kətəˈluɲə]), also known as the Diada, is a day-long festival in Catalonia and one of its official national symbols, celebrated annually on 11 September. It is one of the public holidays in Catalonia.

It commemorates Catalan last stand at the siege and fall of Barcelona at the end of the War of the Spanish Succession in 1714 and the subsequent repression and loss of the Principality of Catalonia's institutions, legal system and, thus, its separate state status.

== History ==
After the evacuation of the pro-Habsburg armies from Spain at the end of the War of the Spanish Succession, as a result of the Peace of Utrecht (1713) in which the Bourbon pretender Philip V was recognized king of the Iberian dominions of the Spanish Monarchy, the Principality of Catalonia unilaterally decided to remain in the war by vote of its Junta de Braços (Catalan assembly of Estates) on 9 July 1713, in order to protect the Catalan constitutions and lives from the expected repression, beginning a brief and separate conflict, the War of the Catalans. After months of intense fighting, the Army of Catalonia raised for that purpose, as well the Coronela (urban militia) of Barcelona were finally defeated at the Siege of Barcelona by the combined Spanish and French armies on 11 September 1714 after 14 months of siege, in which the Chief Councillor (mayor) of Barcelona, Rafael Casanova, was severely wounded during the defence of the wall. The subsequent promulgation of the Nueva Planta decrees (1716) suspended most of the Constitutions of Catalonia and abolished its institutions (among them the General Court of Catalonia, the Generalitat, and the Consell de Cent), meaning the end of the Principality of Catalonia as a separate state, being incorporated as province of a centralized Kingdom of Spain, reorganized as a French-inspired absolute monarchy.

The commemoration was first celebrated on 11 September 1886. In 1888, coinciding with the inauguration of the Barcelona Universal Exposition, a statue in honor of Rafael Casanova was set up, which would become the point of reference of the events of the Diada. The celebration gained popularity over the following years; the Diada of 1923 was a great mass event, with more than a thousand floral offerings, acts throughout Catalonia and a certain institutional participation. But the demonstrations caused 17 wounded, five policemen and 12 protesters, and several arrests. The dictatorship of Primo de Rivera banned the celebration. During the Second Spanish Republic (1931–1939), the Generalitat de Catalunya (the autonomous government of Catalonia established in 1931) institutionalized the celebration. The National Days that took place during the Spanish Civil War (1936, 1937 and 1938) had a marked anti-fascist character and the anarchist trade union CNT took part of the celebrations.

It was suppressed, as part of the anti-Catalan policies, by the Francoist dictatorship in 1939, relegated to the family and private sphere where the holiday continued to be celebrated clandestinely. The monument of Rafael Casanova was removed. Since 1940 the National Front of Catalonia took advantage of the day to carry out some propaganda actions: distribution of anti-fascist leaflets, clandestine hanging of Catalan flags, etc. It was celebrated again publicly for the first time on 11 September 1976, one year after the death of Francisco Franco, being followed the next year by a huge demonstration in Barcelona demanding the restitution of Catalan self-government, in which the Casanova's statue was repositioned in its place, and the celebration was reinstated officially in 1980 by the Generalitat de Catalunya, upon its reestablishment after the Spanish transition to democracy, being the first law approved by the also restored Parliament of Catalonia.

== Observances ==
Catalan organizations, political parties and institutions traditionally lay floral offerings at monuments of those who led the defence of the city such as Rafael Casanova and General Moragues, marking their stand against the Bourbon king Philip V of Spain. Typically, Catalan pro-independence organizations carry demonstrations and meet at the Fossar de les Moreres in Barcelona, where they pay homage to the defenders of city who died during the siege and were buried there.

Throughout the day, there are patriotic demonstrations and cultural events in many Catalan villages and many citizens wave senyeres and estelades. The event has become more explicitly political and particularly focused on independence rallies in the 2010s.

== Gallery ==
National Day of Catalonia gallery

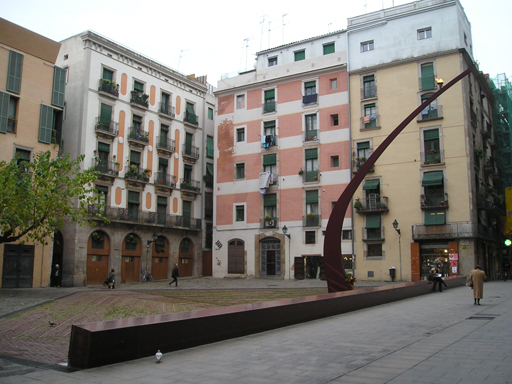
Fossar de les Moreres

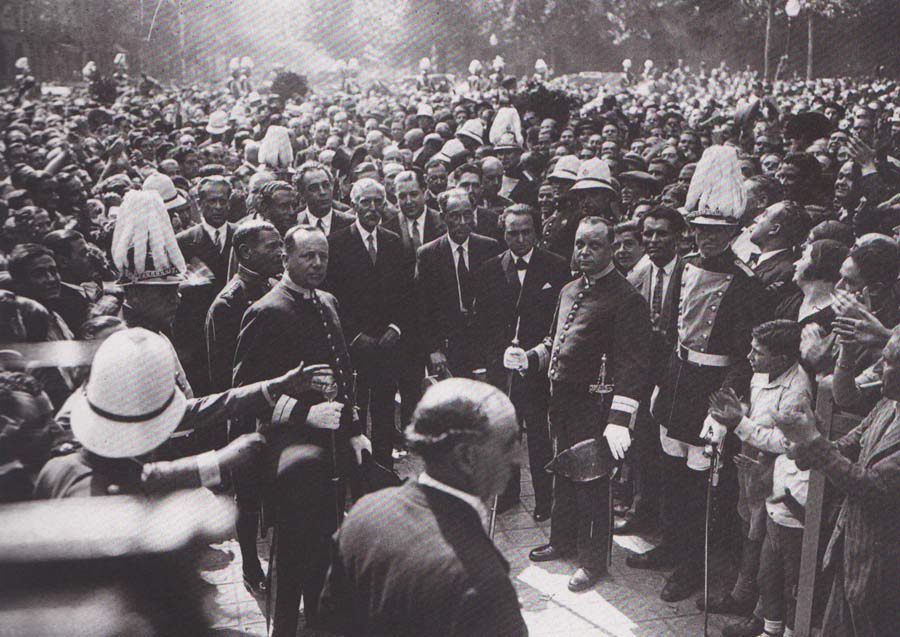
Francesc Macià, first president of the restored Generalitat, at the homage to Rafael Casanova during the National Day of 1931

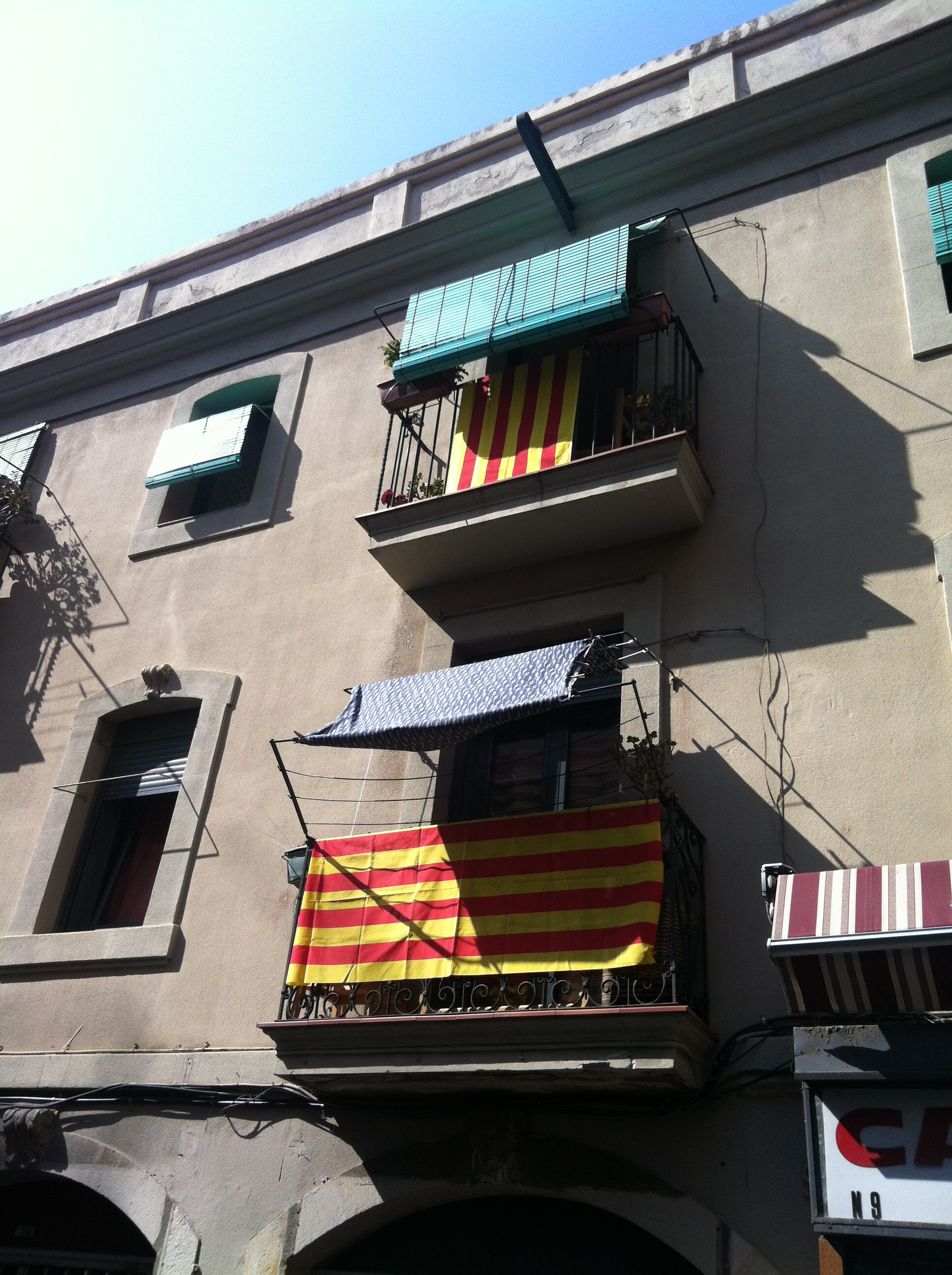
Balconies showing a great number of senyeres, 2012

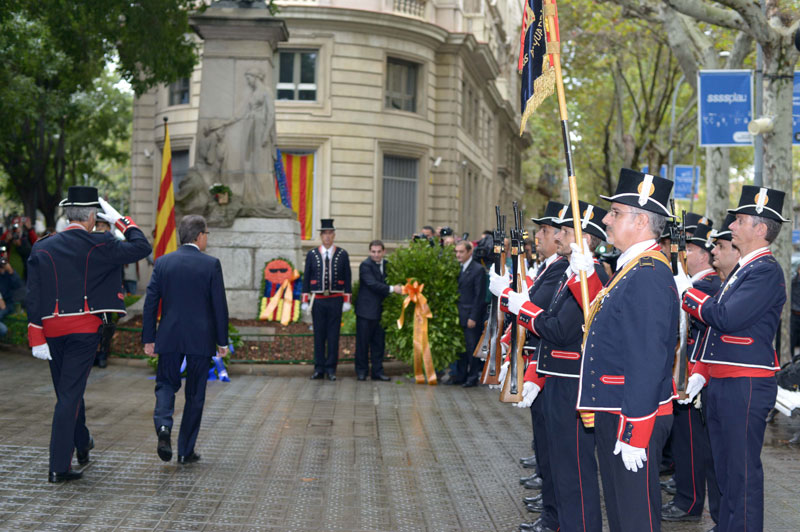
Floral offerings to the monument of Rafael Casanova by President of Catalonia, Artur Mas, in 2013. On the right, Mossos d'Esquadra in gala dresses

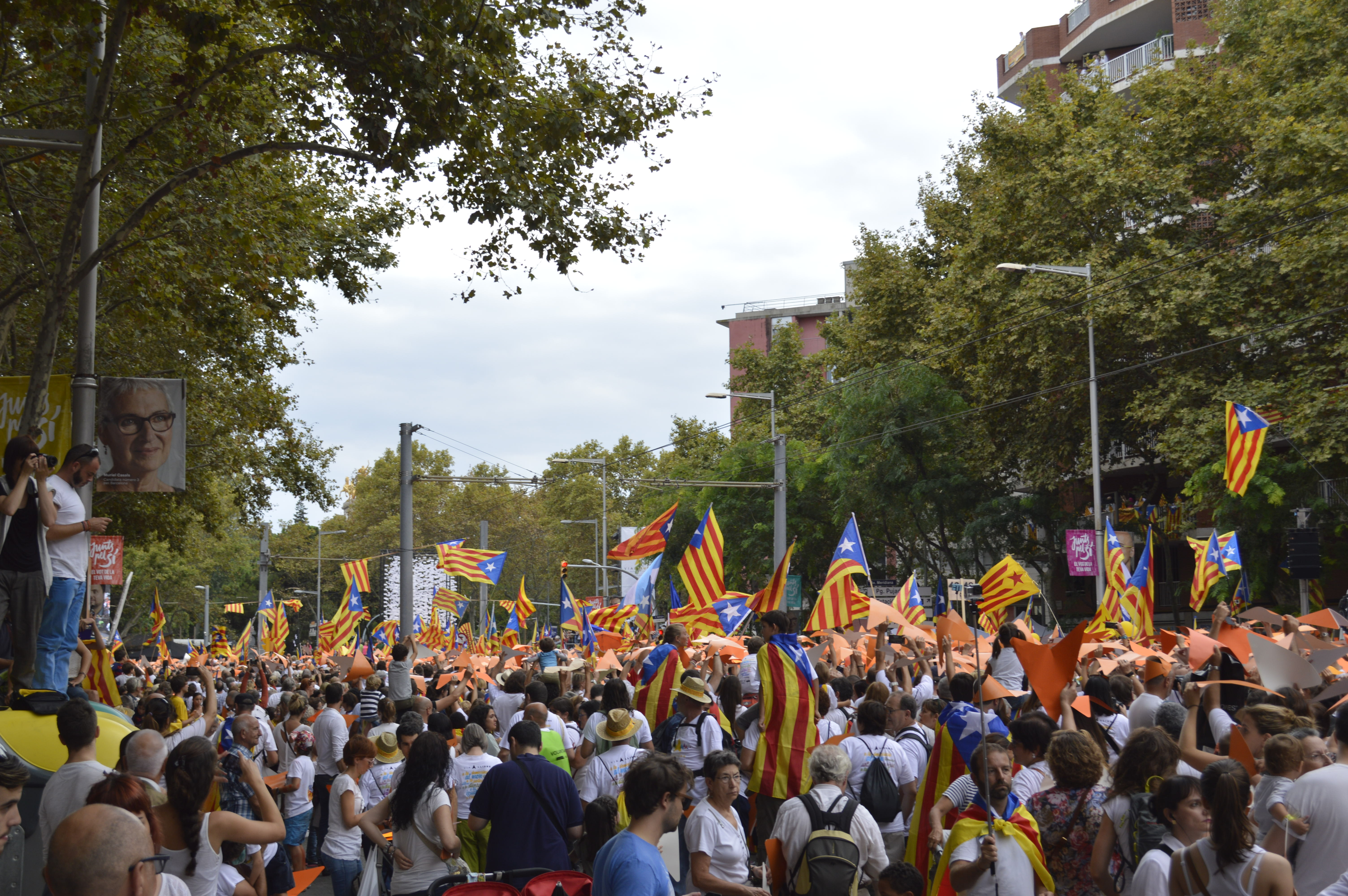
Pro-independence demonstration during the Diada of 2015

== See also ==
- 2012 Catalan independence demonstration
- Catalan Way
