= Juan Martín Cermeño =

Spanish architect, military engineer, and lieutenant general

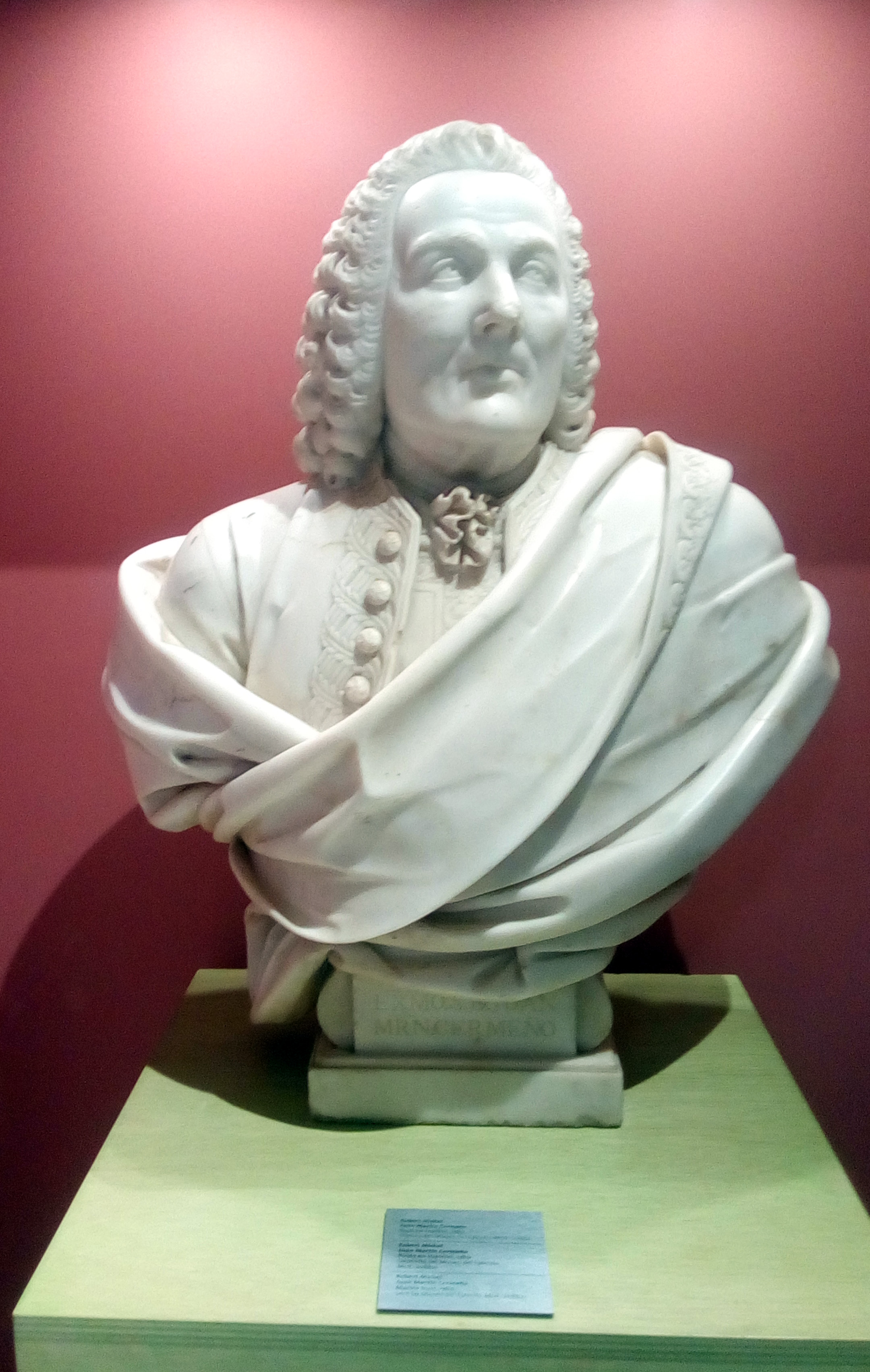
- Bust of Juan Martín Cermeño, by Robert Michel (1780)
- Born: 1700; Ciudad Rodrigo, Salamanca
- Died: 1773 (aged 72–73); Barcelona
- Other name: Zermeño
- Occupations: Architect, Military Engineer, Lieutenant General

Juan Martín Cermeño, or Zermeño (Ciudad Rodrigo, Salamanca, 1700 – Barcelona, 1773) was a Spanish architect, military engineer and lieutenant general.

== Life and work ==
Juan Martín Cermeño, son of Domingo Martín Báez and Isabel Fernández Cermeño was born in Ciudad Rodrigo. In 1719 he joined the Royal Engineers Corps. He reached the rank of field marshal in 1748, between 1749 and 1756 he had been an acting general commander of the military engineers.

From a young age he began collaborating in construction works. In 1721 Cermano reformed the entire exterior circuit of the Old Town Melilla and that same year, Cermeño married Antonia de Paredes Fernández, in Melilla, where his son, Pedro Martín Cermeño, was born in 1722.

In 1727 he participated in the siege of Gibraltar. In 1749, Cermeño was appointed General Commander of the Engineers.

In 1751 Cermeño commissioned Pedro de Lucuce to make a report on how to defend the new frontier between Catalonia and France. In September 1753, Cermeño initiated the works of Sant Ferran Castle advised in Lucuce's report in Figueras. His son, Pedro Martín Cermeño, took over the works in 1756.

The Captain General of Catalonia, Jaime de Guzmán y Spinola, II Marquis of la Mina, commissioned him to lay out a new neighborhood in Barcelona that would be called La Barceloneta, following Verboom's construction of the Citadel of Barcelona. Although Verboom had initially drawn up plans for the new district, these were never carried out and, in 1753, Cermeño drew up completely new plans for what would be one of Europe's major urban planning projects during the Enlightenment.

In 1755 he designed the Castle of San Pedro de la Roca del Morro, at the entrance to the bay of Santiago de Cuba.

In 1758 he was appointed Governor of Oran and held the position until 1765. Nine years later his son Pedro Martín Cermeño, also a military engineer, occupied the same position.

The Marqués de la Mina also commissioned Cermeño with the project of the refurbishing works of the Montjuïc Castle in Barcelona. The old fort was demolished and rebuilt in 1779.

Cermeño was involved in city planning of Manila, and fortification of various places including Plaza de Cartagena, Castle of the Moors and planning the expansion of the defenses in Montevideo.
