= War of the Catalans =

Military campaign (1713–14) of the War of the Spanish Succession

- Part of the War of the Spanish Succession
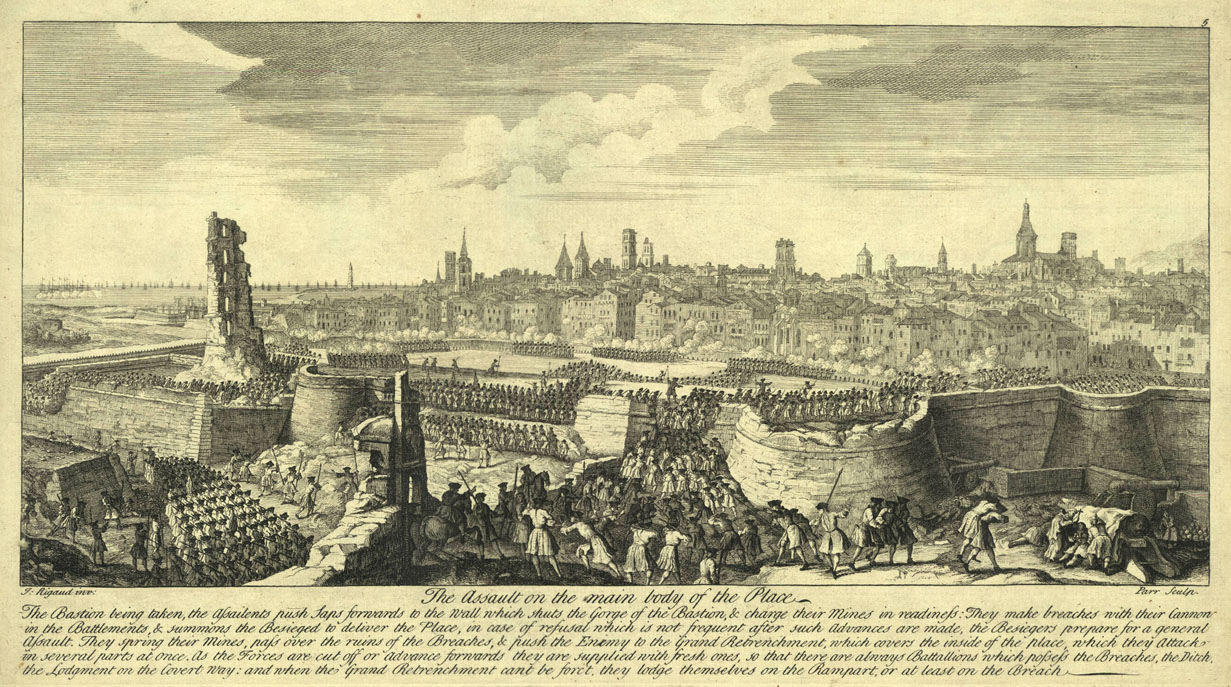
- The Siege of Barcelona
Date	1713–1714
Location	Principality of Catalonia
Result	Bourbon victory

Belligerents
Pro-Bourbon Spain; France	Principality of Catalonia

Commanders and leaders
(Spain) Duke of Popoli (Kingdom of France) Duke of Berwick	(Principality of Catalonia) Antoni de Villarroel; Rafael Casanova

Strength
80,000 soldiers	13,000 soldiers (including navy), 4,700 militia men, 1,500 volunteers

The War of the Catalans or Particular War of Catalonia (Catalan: Guerra dels Catalans or Guerra Particular de Catalunya) was a separate conflict derived from the last phase of the War of the Spanish Succession, which affected the Principality of Catalonia. This last phase of the conflict began when, despite the armistice signed between Philip V and Charles VI of Austria that put an end to the war from July 1, 1713, the Three Commons of Catalonia —a consultive body made up by the most prominent Catalan political institutions: the Generalitat, the Military Arm of Catalonia and the Consell de Cent of Barcelona— proclaimed on 9 July 1713 the continuation of the war against Philip V and France, thus prolonging the war until 12 September 1714.

The end of the War and the Catalan defeat led to the suppression of the institutions and legal system of the Principality of Catalonia, which ended its status as separate state and it was annexed as a province to the newly centralized and absolutist Kingdom of Spain, as well as the disproportionate increase in the tax burden, and the imposition of the administrative use of Spanish language, progressively displacing Catalan.

== History ==
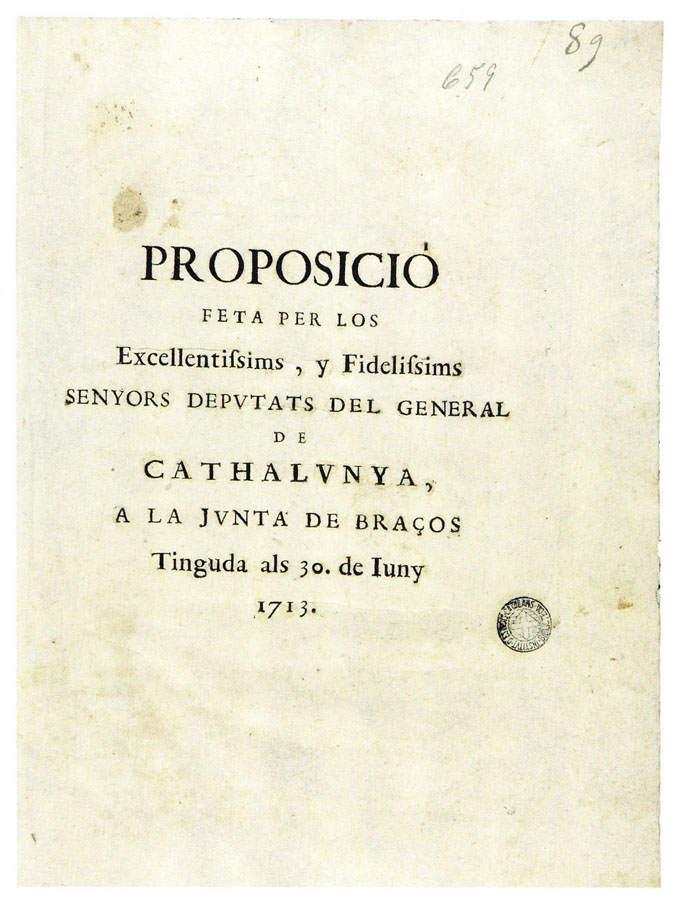
Proposal presented by the members of the Generalitat on June 30, 1713 before the Junta de Braços, and which would end on July 9 with the publication of the edict by which Catalonia declared war to "defend its freedom"

On March 14, 1713, during the negotiations for the Peace of Utrecht, Charles of Austria resignated to the facts and signed the "Armistice Agreement and Evacuation of Catalonia", while asking the British that the Principality of Catalonia was established as an independent republic, or that if it remained under the rule of Philip V it would preserve the Catalan constitutions. But after the resignation of Philip V to the throne of France, the delivery of Gibraltar and the Balearic island of Menorca, and several commercial concessions in America, the British yielded to Philip V who they recognized as the legitimate Spanish monarch, granting amnesty to the Catalans and the same rights and privileges as the inhabitants of the Crown of Castile, meaning de facto abolition of the laws of Catalonia.

Charles of Austria notified the evacuation of the Habsburg troops to the members of the Generalitat, concluding that continuing the war would only cause useless bloodbath which would have no more result for Catalonia than its total and absolute destruction, in the face of which he induced them to accept the "General Pardon to the Catalans" promulgated by Philip V. A few days later the empress left Barcelona and on June 22, 1713, the representatives of Philip and Charles signed the "Hospitalet Convention", which ended the War of Succession in Spanish territory without guarantee the maintenance of the Constitutions of Catalonia. But a radical faction of the Catalan lower aristocracy forced the members of the Generalitat to convene a Junta de Braços which, after slow discussions on July 9, 1713, and with the overwhelming support and pressure of the Commoner Estate, unilaterally proclaimed the continuation of the war in the name of the king "for the conservation of the Liberties, Privileges and Prerogatives of the Catalans, which our predecessors obtained at the expense of gloriously shedding blood and we must, likewise, maintain, which have not been taken into consideration Utrecht, nor in l'Hospitalet."

From the Bourbon point of view, the war of succession had ended, so that the Three Commons of Catalonia committed the crimes of rebellion and Lèse-majesté against their legitimate monarch, who did not recognize the Three Commons as a contending power, nor as a valid interlocutor of Charles of Austria with whom he had signed an armistice. On the contrary, the Three Commons proclaimed that the war was not over and that they were acting under the protection of their legitimate monarch -Charles of Austria-, who, they believed, in view of their determination to fight, would not be long in coming to save Catalonia.

Initially reduced to Barcelona, a council of government was set up which, faced with the evacuation of the Habsburg army, raised an army of its own -the Army of Catalonia- appointing Antoni de Villarroel as commander general. On July 25, 1713, the Bourbon armies arrived in front of Barcelona but, unable to take it, blocked it on the ground hoping to suffocate it. But within the city, the division between radicals and moderates -even the Chief Councilor of Barcelona Manuel Flix i Ferreró was in favor of the submission negotiated with Philip V- harmed the initiatives of the first months of the war. The moderates attempted a diplomatic operation in collusion with the Catalan ambassador in London Pau Ignasi Dalmases to surrender Catalonia to Philip V in a negotiated manner, but in November 1713, the election of the new Chief Councilor Rafael Casanova frustrated the plan.

He focused on going on the offensive by ordering an expedition outside Barcelona under the orders of the Marquis of Poal, landing in Arenys de Mar. The operation was favored when, at the beginning of January 1714, a general uprising broke out against the Bourbon occupying troops, provoked by orders from Madrid to collect taxes in Catalonia. The uprising of the Catalan countryside, calling on the subject to the cry of "Away, thieves!" forced the withdrawal of 10,000 Bourbon soldiers from Barcelona, alleviating the siege of the city.

Meanwhile, in Utrecht, Spanish diplomats negotiated the Treaty of Commerce between Spain and Great Britain that generalized commercial prebends to English merchants and in London they managed to get Secretary of State Henry Bolingbroke to order the British squadron to help Philip V's troops attack Barcelona. In February 1714, an attempted coup d'état took place inside Barcelona, as a result of which a new government junta was formed —the "Council of the 24"— headed by the councilors of Barcelona to whom the deputies of the Generalitat ceded the war direction. Thus it was completed the process through which the Chief Councilor of Barcelona, Rafael Casanova, became the highest political and military leader of Catalonia.

The Treaty of Utrecht had postponed the solution of the "Case of the Catalans" for a later treaty, a "Universal Peace" that was being negotiated in Rastatt between the Austrians and the French, and on which the entire strategy of the radicals was based. However, Spanish diplomatic pressures managed to frustrate the negotiation and in the Treaty of Rastatt of March 1714 the situation of Catalonia was not addressed, all hopes expecting aid from Charles of Austria fading. Immediately in April 1714 the government of Philip V offered a negotiated solution to the conflict but the radicalized Council of the 24 rejected submission if the Constitutions of Catalonia were not maintained. In May 1714 the defenders of the city solemnly swore to "fight to the last drop of blood" while the war in the Catalan countryside devastated the country. The balance of power could not be broken until July 1714, when Louis XIV of France ordered the French army under the command of Marshal Berwick to enter Spain and a veritable military siege against Barcelona began.

French artillery began to pound the walls while French engineers opened the attack trenches from which the Bourbon troops began to approach the walls of Barcelona. On 12, 13 and 14 August they launched several attacks to conquer the city but were repulsed. Meanwhile in London the diplomatic miracle that Catalans had been waiting for occurred: the death of Queen Anne of Great Britain led to a change of government in England. The Catalan ambassador in London pressured the British Regency Council and it ordered the British Mediterranean fleet to head to Barcelona to save the city, but French diplomatic pressure caused the orders to be stopped at the last moment, which remained in suspense until the enthronement of George I as British monarch.

In Barcelona the situation had become critical as there was no more food left. Without enough troops to stop another Bourbon assault and prevent a massacre, Villarroel pressured the "Junta dels 24" to capitulate.

On 11 September, the Bourbon troops launched the final assault on Barcelona. After about 10 hours of fighting, Villarroel, who had been wounded, unilaterally decided to suspend hostilities without the authorization of the Catalan political leaders. Finally, on 12 September, with the city in ruins and the walls occupied by the Bourbons, the Three Commons began negotiations of surrender, and Barcelona was finally occupied on 13 September 1714. In the capitulation pact, Berwick granted the leaders of the rebellion life and pardon for the crimes they had committed. Four days later, on 16 September 1714, the Three Commons of Catalonia —the Generalitat of Catalonia, the Consell de Cent of Barcelona, and the Military Arm of Catalonia— were abolished. On September 20, the French army surrendered Barcelona to the Spanish government, at which time, in violation of the pacts of Berwick, 25 military officers of the Catalan army were imprisoned and used as scapegoats before Philip V. After repealing the Catalan constitutions, in January 1716 Philip V promulgated the Nueva Planta Decree that established absolutism in Catalonia.

== Bibliography ==
- Albareda, Joaquim (2010). La Guerra de Sucesión de España (1700-1714). Barcelona: Crítica. ISBN 9788498920604.
- Sanpere, Salvador (1905). Fin de la Nación Catalana. Barcelona: Base, 2001. ISBN 8485031121.
