= Victus =

Historical novel

First edition (publ. Editorial La Campana)

Victus, the Fall of Barcelona is a historical novel by the Catalan anthropologist Albert Sánchez Piñol published by HarperCollins in September 2014. It is based in the fictitious biography of Lieutenant Colonel Marti Zuviria who, being 98, tells from Vienna his memories as an engineer serving the commander Antoni de Villarroel during the War of the Spanish Succession, especially during the Siege of Barcelona.

The book was originally written in Spanish, but was quickly translated into Catalan and many other languages, including English. Since its original publication in October 2012, the book has sold more than 200,000 copies either in Catalan or Spanish, and the rights of translation have been sold for the book to be translated into Russian, German, Dutch, Italian, Portuguese, French, Korean, and Croatian. In 2015, the author published the novel's sequel, Vae Victus.

== Controversy ==
On September the 4, 2014, the book's launch ceremony in Utrecht was cancelled because of pressures coming from the Spanish Embassy in the Netherlands, who declared the ceremony as "sensitive for the political moment" and blamed the book for "historical distortion" in favour of the independentist Catalonian movement. Juliette van Wersch, the Dutch editor of Victus, described the fact as censorship, but avoiding any comment about the alleged historical distortion.
