= Rafael Casanova =

Catalan jurist (1660–1743)

Rafael Casanova i Comes
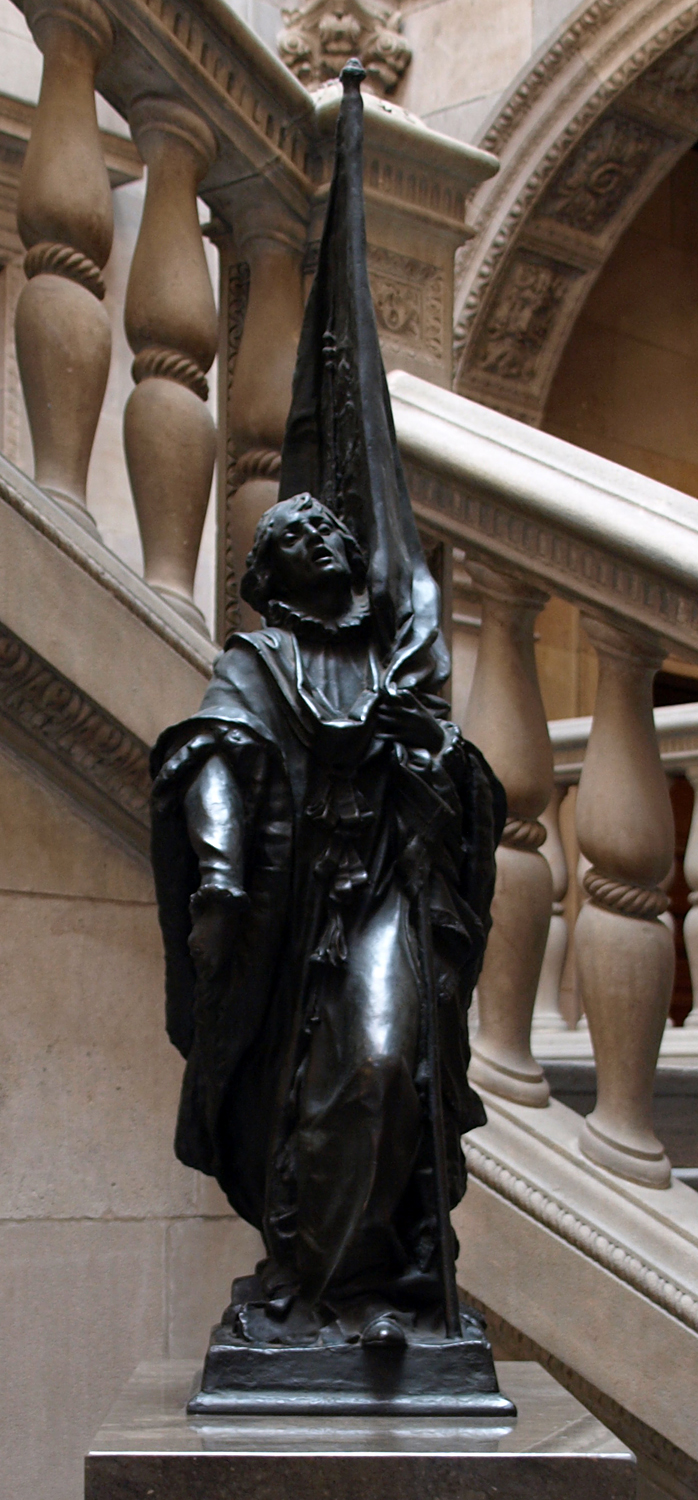
- Statue in Barcelona by Rossend Nobas (1888)

Head Councillor of Barcelona
- In office 30 November 1713 – 11 September 1714
- Monarch: Charles VI, Holy Roman Emperor
- Preceded by: Manuel Flix i Ferreró

Personal details
- Born: circa 1660 Moià, Principality of Catalonia, Monarchy of Spain
- Died: 2 May 1743 (aged 83) Sant Boi de Llobregat, Principality of Catalonia, Kingdom of Spain
- Party: Austriacist
- Spouse: Maria Bosch i Barba
- Occupation: Lawyer
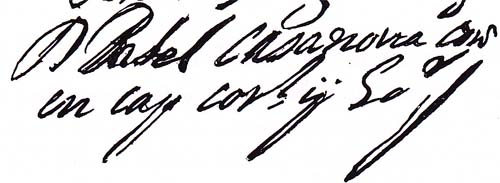
- Signature

Rafael Casanova i Comes (Catalan pronunciation: [rəˈfɛl ˌkazəˈnɔβə]; 1660 – 2 May 1743) was a Catalan jurist and supporter of Charles VI, Holy Roman Emperor as a claimant to the Crown of Spain during the War of the Spanish Succession. He became mayor of Barcelona and commander in chief of Catalonia during the Siege of Barcelona until he was wounded in combat while commanding La Coronela during the counterattack on the Saint Peter front on the last day of the siege, 11 September 1714. After the war he received a royal pardon for having supported the Habsburg claim to the Spanish throne. He recovered from his wounds, and continued his fight against absolute monarchy as a lawyer. It has been claimed that he is the author of the book Record de l'Aliança fet el Sereníssim Jordi Augusto Rey de la Gran Bretanya (Remembrance of the Alliance to George I of Great Britain) in which Catalonia reminds England of the Treaty of Genoa and their obligation to Catalonia.

== Life ==
Rafael was born in Moià around 1660 and lived there until he turned 14 years old, his birth place now houses two museums, one which is dedicated to Rafael himself and the other being the Archaeology and Paleontology Museum – Caves of the Toll of Moià.

He was one of eleven children of Rafael Casanova i Solà (1625–1682), a landowner of a rural estate in Moià, and Maria Comes i Sors († 1684), from Lliçà d'Amunt. At the time of his birth, the Casanova family enjoyed a solid financial position based on farming and the trade of grain and wool to supply the powerful textile industry in the subvegueria of Moianès. The Casanovas had a long tradition of participating in public affairs: his father was the head of a Catalan paramilitary organization called Sometent (dissolved 1978) in 1650, Councillor of the People (1652) and the head of the Moianès subvegueria (1659).

The inheritance of the family lands was reserved to his brother, Francisco Casanova, as was the lineage itself. Thus, the young Rafael moved to Barcelona to study law, in 1678. At the age of 18 he had achieved a Doctor of Law degree. His father died in 1682 and his mother two years later, in 1684. Three years after that, in 1687, his older brother Francis was named as an honorable citizen of Barcelona, as Moiá had the dignity to be the "street and arm of Barcelona", that is, the people of Moià enjoyed the same exemptions, rights and privileges as the people of Barcelona, and, were under the jurisdiction of the Councillors of Barcelona.

In 1696, with his career established, he married the heiress Maria Bosch i Barba, daughter of Pau Bosch and Maria Barba. The Bosch family were a lineage of apothecaries from Barcelona that had important properties in Sant Boi de Llobregat. Maria Bosch had become the widow of a medical doctor, Josep Campllonch i Puig, with whom she had a son named Josep.

In the "marriage agreement", it stated that Rafael Casanova would not obtain possession of the assets of the Bosch family, but would only temporarily manage them while their children remain underage. This way, Rafael Casanova, the young man who came from Moià, economically consolidated his ascending position in Barcelona, while the Bosch family got a son in law to manage their assets.

Pau Bosch set a £2,750 dowry for his daughter, adding £2,500 for children born from the marriage, an amount which the Campllonch family held and should have returned, but failed to do so in full, returning only £759. The newly wed couple went to live in an apartment rented by Rafael, on the street of Banys Nous 16. This house was discovered by the historian, Albert Garcia Espuche, where a newly constructed building stands. In 2014, during the events of the "Tricentenari" (tercentenary) of 1714, Barcelona erected a commemorative plaque.

They had four children:

- Francesc (?–1710)
- Rafael Casanova i Bosch (7 March 1701; Barcelona – 1768; Sant Boi de Llobregat)
- Pau (1704–1704)
- Teresa (1704–1704)

In 1697, Maria Bosch gave Rafael, her husband, new powers to manage the assets of the Bosch family, which were augmented in 1700 by Pau Bosch, her father.

On 29 December 1704 Maria Bosch died during childbirth, the newborn twins, Pau and Teresa, died a few days later.

== The Spanish Succession ==
In November 1700, Charles II died, the last Habsburg Spanish monarch. The Duke of Anjou, a member of the Bourbon dynasty, was appointed as his successor, and enthroned under the name of Philip V of Spain. In 1702, the War of Spanish Succession started when the House of Austria invaded the Spanish territories in Italy. In 1703, maritime powers, England and Holland joined the House of Austria and declared war against the Two Crowns, Bourbon France and Spain. In Vienna the young archduke Charles of Austria was called for as an alternative candidate to rule Spain. In 1704, Charles moved to Portugal, where he sought to recover the Spanish throne for the Habsburg dynasty. On the other side of the peninsula his allies launched an attempted landing in Barcelona with the complicity of a small number of Austrian locals. The plot was discovered and the allied landings failed. The exiled Austrian viceroy of Catalonia, Francisco Velasco was shocked and, wanting to avoid any further Austrian conspiracies, began an indiscriminate repression in Barcelona, repeatedly violating the Constitutions of Catalonia. This was a policy that unleashed hatred against his sovereign Philip V of Spain.

Barcelona was governed by its own citizens, who chose six judges, as directors of Barcelona. These six judges were renewed annually during the feast of St. Andrew, 30 November. The election process consisted of judges being chosen by lot, and by balloting system consisting of a bag in which were placed the names of candidates written on paper, from this bag a child drew the citizens elected to govern the city. The nominee could resign if his judiciary experience was not considered suitable; once appointed they were advised and supervised by the Consell de Cent, the general assembly of citizens.

The ministries were assigned based on social classes, with the result that the chief minister candidates in the bag only contained corresponding names of those who had the title of "Honored Citizen", a distinction given to only those locals that were significantly distinguished public service in Barcelona.

This policy worked effectively so lesser known citizens like the tailor Bartomeu Oliver, the sailor Macià Ros, or the barber Pere Torner governed Barcelona, as well as more renowned citizens such as nobleman Ramon de Codina o Antoni de Valencia, the lawyer Gabriel Bòria, the doctor Francesc Orriols and the merchant Jeroni Mascaró. There was a sense of duty in governing their own city, and the position was not taken lightly. Once the annual term ended, the judge would return to the ranks of citizenry, resuming the exercise of their professions. The repressive policy of the Viceroy Velasco began raising protests which raged from 1703 to 1704. Advisers who disagreed with his methods and his violation of the laws, feared that the new Bourbon king of Spain would try to impose the same absolutist politics that his grandfather Louis XIV had applied in France and Espain

== War of the Spanish Succession ==
After years of the Viceroy's outrages, the Barcelona Board resolved to send Pau Ignasi Dalmases to the court of Madrid in order to protest to Philip V himself, about the violations of the Catalan laws that were committed by his viceroy; however, reaching the court the emissary he was arrested and jailed, which again violated the Catalan constitutions. Three months later, during the feast of the Holy Cross of Christ, 3 May 1705, a military uprising broke out in Vic Habsburg. Alongside the exiled Austrian leaders, Catalonia signed the Pact of Genoa, a treaty established a military alliance between England and Catalonia. Catalonia pledged to fight for the cause of the claimant to the Spanish throne, Charles of Austria, with military aid from England, who in exchange pledged to defend the Constitutions of Catalonia whatever the outcome of the war. Allied troops landed, turning back to Barcelona and then surrounding the city in October 1705. Viceroy Velasco, and the Bourbon garrison that was in Barcelona capitulated. The councilors of the Government of Catalonia and Barcelona received Charles of Austria hailing him as a liberator. Within days, Archduke Charles swore allegiance to the Constitutions of Catalonia.

== Siege of Barcelona ==
In November 1705, new citizens were chosen to act as advisers, one of whom, Jacint Lloredà died on 18 January 1706. There was a new drawing on 25 January to appoint his replacement. Luckily it was ruled that the lawyer Rafael Casanova, who was then a widower and was about 46 years old should take his place; in the afternoon of that day two emissaries of the city announced his appointment. Two days later, having closed its professional affairs, the city council sent Baltasar de Luna and Antonio Valencia to take the oath. On 28 January Dr. Rafael Casanova went to the City Hall where he was received by the clerk and other officials of the Hundred. From there they accompanied him to the chapel where he prayed, then entered the hall where he was received by all other directors and entered the chapel where they heard mass. Finally they returned to the room where the council oath as Chief Casanova third in Barcelona.

Meanwhile, Philip V was preparing an offensive to retake the city. The ministers of Charles of Austria were in favor of leaving Barcelona to avoid being captured should the city surrender, but Barcelona's councilors pressured them to stay. On 30 March 1706, the Minister Rafael Casanova addressed Charles of Austria on behalf of the city offering the sacrifice of the lives of the locals in their defense, and finally on 2 April the king issued a statement agreeing to stay in Barcelona to resist the attack. The next day the troops of Philip V, surrounded the city starting Bourbon siege. On 15 April they began bombing the inner city with firebombs and then undertaking operations aimed at the conquest of the fortress of Montjuic from which, once taken, they could force the surrender of the capital. On 21 April the troops of Philip V had taken positions near the fort and began to harass her. Then the rumor spread among the locals that the British troops had agreed to surrender Montjuic. The rumor caused the outbreak of a general mutiny and a group of extremists began to touch the alarm bells summoning the locals fight to prevent the surrender, the Minister-in-Chief Francis tried to stop the alarm but fell during the riots and was killed.

With the city under fire and making chaos of the municipal government, the Second Minister Francesc Gallart, the lawyer, and the third chief counsel Rafael Casanova gave Directives to restore order and the government of the city, while reinforcing the defenses of Montjuïc. However, nothing seemed to stop the progress the Bourbon troops were making, and fear rose of the imminent collapse of Montjuic and Barcelona. However, on 8 May, the English fleet commanded by Admiral John Leake was glimpsed on the horizon. The sight of the fleet caused the Bourbon troops to break ranks, and retreat hastily, abandoning their wounded, their supplies and artillery. Barcelona had been released from the siege and the Bourbon troops who failed to secure their supply lines in their advance, had to flee to France. Months later, inquiries were made about what happened during the assault on Mont Juic; the Second Minister Francesc Gallart, who before the war had shown sympathy Philip, was removed from the lists of candidates for public office, and then banished from the city. Conversely, on 6 February 1707, Charles of Austria was rewarded the Third Minister Rafael Casanova with the title "Honored Citizen of Barcelona" and he was honored for his performance at the head of the city government during the siege.

== After siege ==
With his new position as the Honoured Citizen, Rafael Casanova reached the political pinnacle of Barcelona. From that year he attended all meetings of the Hundred, and his name became part of the exclusive list of people who could be drawn to become chief minister of Barcelona, which took place in 1713. Also in 1708, in recognition of his prestige and reputation, Rafael Casanova was one of the designated representative, with Manuel de Ferrer i Sitges and Cristòfor Lledó i Carreras, from Barcelona, that queen Elizabeth received during the wedding ceremony with King Charles of Austria.

Late in 1708 his in-law Paul Bosch died, having been predeceased by all her children and leaving three grandchildren: Francisco Casanova and Bosch, and Rafael Casanova Bosch, and Josep Campllonch Garza, son of the first marriage his dead daughter. Leave it as universal heir heritage Francisco Casanova Bosch, leaving as the second heir to his younger brother Rafael if the first died childless, and finally determined that the legacy by his grandson Joseph Garza was Campllonch 3000 Barcelona pounds. In the year 1709, Campllonch demanded full payment of £3,000, while Casanova defended the patrimony of his children recalling that Campllonch had received 2,750 pounds and 2,500 pounds of dowry increase, which had only 750 pounds back, when the second marriage of his mother Mary Bosch, reason 3,000 pounds of legacy claiming Campllonch were settled. The disagreement will would lead to a lengthy legal dispute that lasted until 1744.

After the siege of Barcelona 1706, Austrian troops advanced without opposition to conquer Madrid, but withdrew soon after when the troops of Philip V, reinforced in France, crossed the border. They continue advancing until the Battle of Almansa. After a failed peace treaty in 1709, Austrian troops launched a new offensive which culminated in 1710 with the capture of Madrid again. Forced to leave the city before the arrival of French reinforcements, in 1711. In September 1711 that year Archduke Charles left the peninsula heading to Vienna to take the Holy Roman Empire. In 1712, Rafael Casanova and Manuel de Ferrer i Sitges, attended a conference where they negotiated political situation in Catalonia.

The year 1713, began formally in the Dutch city of Utrecht peace talks between major powers. Initially the ambassadors of Emperor Charles VI insisted that the Principality of Catalonia being elevated to the status of an independent republic. However, after Philip V renounced the throne of France (Article 2), the Gibraltar (Article 10) and Menorca (Article 11), and commercial advantages granted to the Indians (Article 12), the English yield to Philip V on 14 May 1713, to recognize him as legitimate king of Spain, although the deal remained secret until 13 July 1713. For his part Philip V pledged in Article 13 of the Treaty of Utrecht, to grant the Catalans amnesty, but only the same rights and privileges that the inhabitants of the Crown of Castile. The Article was supposed de facto repeal of the Constitutions of Catalonia, as he had done previously with Aragon and Valencia, and devoting the abolition of laws, rights and government of all states the Crown of Aragon, which thereafter would come under laws and government of the Council of Castile. British ships began shortly after the evacuation of the last remaining Allied troops in Catalonia, enabling the rapid advancement of the Bourbons toward Catalonia in Barcelona.

== Catalonia declares war: the siege of Barcelona ==
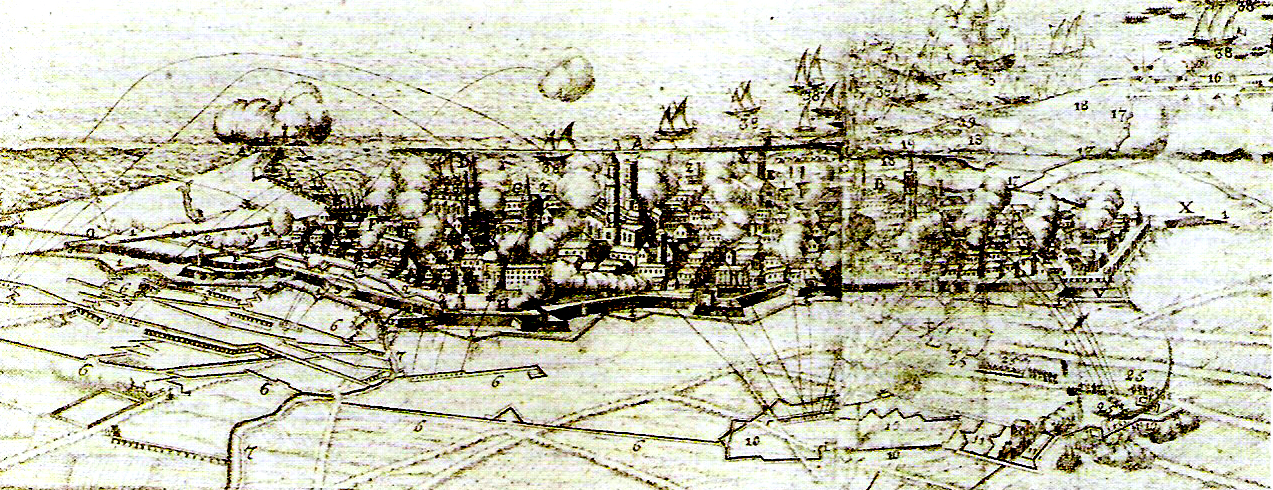
Barcelona being bombarded by the absolutist troops of Louis XIV of France and Philip V of Spain.

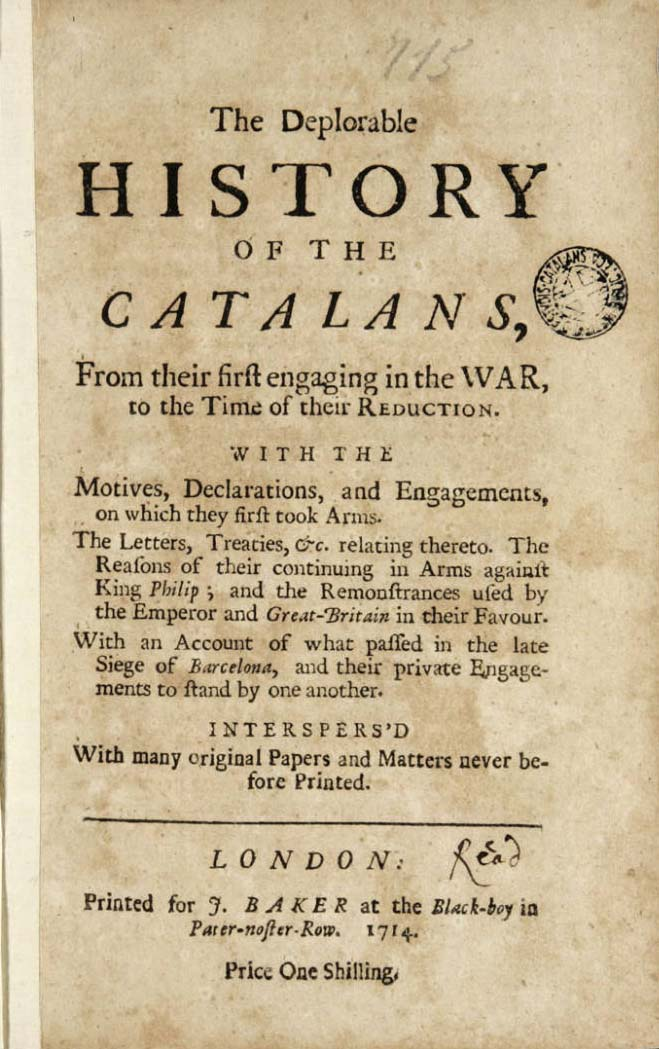
The Deplorable History of the Catalans «a free and generous People, the faithful and useful Allies of this Kingdom, were betrayed, in the most unparalleled Manner, into irrevocable Slavery»

After the Peace of Utrecht (1713) he participated in the Junta de Braços (parliament) in which Catalonia proclaimed the continuation of the war in defense of their constitutions the on 6 July 1713. While Barcelona was besieged by Bourbon troops, he was proclaimed "Conseller en Cap" (mayor) of Barcelona on 30 November 1713, and by virtue of their functions he was also colonel of the regiment of the milícia citizen, governor of Barcelona and the fortress of Montjuïc, as well as member of the Vintiquatrena Board of Government.

On 26 February 1714 Rafael Casanova became the highest military and political authority in Catalonia, when the Generalitat of Catalonia gave him all the military powers and also was named president of the ninth Board of war. It ruled the city until he was wounded in combat when commanding a counterattack of the Barcelona milícia at the Sanint Peter front on the last day of siege, 11 September 1714. Having capitulated the city, the institutions of self-government of Catalonia were abolished and Rafael Casanova was cleared of its political and military positions. After the defeat their assets were seized, being amnestied years later to return to practice as a lawyer in Barcelona until shortly before his death. He maintained contact with several that had been leaders of the city during the siege, as well as with the exiles in the Austrian Empire, and is credited with the authorship of a public manifesto addressed to king George II of Great Britain remembering the alliance between Catalonia and England which was published in 1736, the twenty-second year of our slavery. Rafel Casanova died in 1743 and two years after, the English historian Tindal wrote in 1745:

The Catalans, thus abandoned and given up to their enemies, contrary to faith and honour, were not however, wanting to their own defence; but appealing to Heaven, and hanging up at the High Altar the Queen’s solemn declaration to protect them, underwent the utmost miseries of a siege; during which multitudes perished by famine and the sword, many were afterward executed, and many persons of figure were dispersed about the Spanish Dominions and dungeons.

— Nicolas Tindal; History of England (1745)

== Homage to Rafael Casanova ==
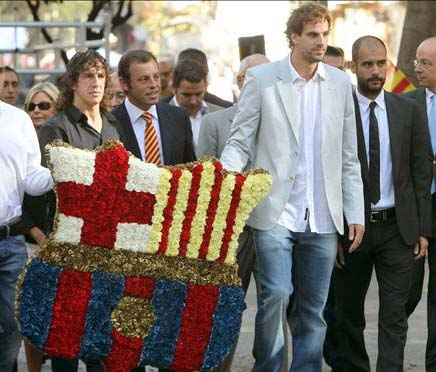
FC Barcelona tribute to Rafael Casanova on the National Day of Catalonia. (left to right) Football captain Carles Puyol, club president Sandro Rosell, former FCB basketball player Roger Grimau and football manager Pep Guardiola deposit wreaths and floral decorations at the foot of the Rafael Casanova monument.

His figure has become an icon of catalanism, regarding him as one of their great Patriots. A hundred and fifty years after the end of the war (in 1863), the city of Barcelona dedicated a street to Rafael Casanova; In 1888 again the municipal consistory honored his memory by erecting a statue in his honor as the last 'Conceller in Cap', shot in this city brandishing the flag of Santa Eulalia in defense of the Catalan institutions. From that year the monument to Rafael Casanova became a place to call for the return of Catalan freedom and institutions of self-governance, especially when these were abolished during the dictatorship of the general Miguel Primo de Rivera, who also prohibited paying tribute to Rafael Casanova, and again abolished during the dictatorship of the general Francisco Franco, when the statue was also withdrawn. Since the restitution in 1977 of the monument in honor of Rafael Casanova, it was placed near where he fell wounded in battle fighting against the absolutist troops. One of the traditional acts of the National Day of Catalonia is that carried out by the Catalan institutions, most of the Catalan political forces, and representatives of major cultural, social and sports associations from Catalonia like FC Barcelona, who present wreaths and floral decorations at the foot of the monument. It is also remembered what was said in 1715 in House of Lords.

"[..] and the Honour of the British Nation, always renowned for the Love of Liberty, and for giving Protection to the Assertors of it, was most basely prostituted and a free and generous People, the faithful and useful Allies of this Kingdom, were betrayed, in the most unparalleled Manner, into irrevocable Slavery.

— Journal of the House of Lords, vol 19, 20 (1715)

== Bibliography ==
- Various Authors (2006): Catalunya durant la Guerra de Successió. Barcelona: Ara Llibres
- Baker, J: Deplorable History of the Catalans : from their first engaging in the war, to the time of their reduction with the motives, declarations, and engagements, on which they first took arms, the letters, treaties, .... London, 1714
- Baker, J: The Case of the Catalans considered. London, 1714
- Manonelles, M.: The House of Lords and the ‘Case of the Catalans’
- Serret, C. (1996): Rafael Casanova i Comes, Conseller en Cap. Sant Boi de Llobregat: Ajunt. de Sant Boi de Llobregat.
