= Fossar de les Moreres =

Square in Barcelona, Spain

Coordinates: 41°23′01″N 2°10′56″E

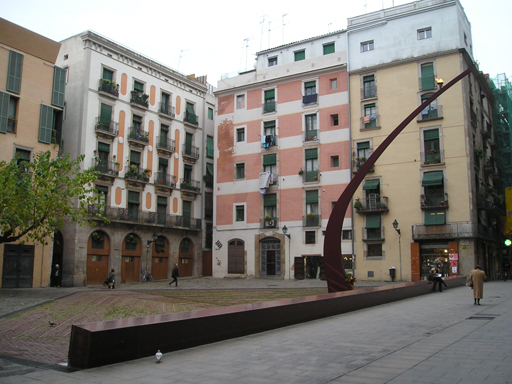
General view

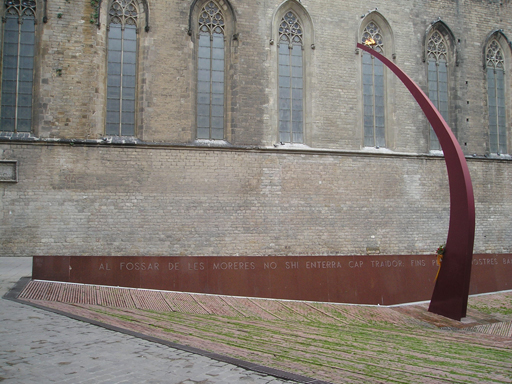
Near Santa Maria del Mar basilica

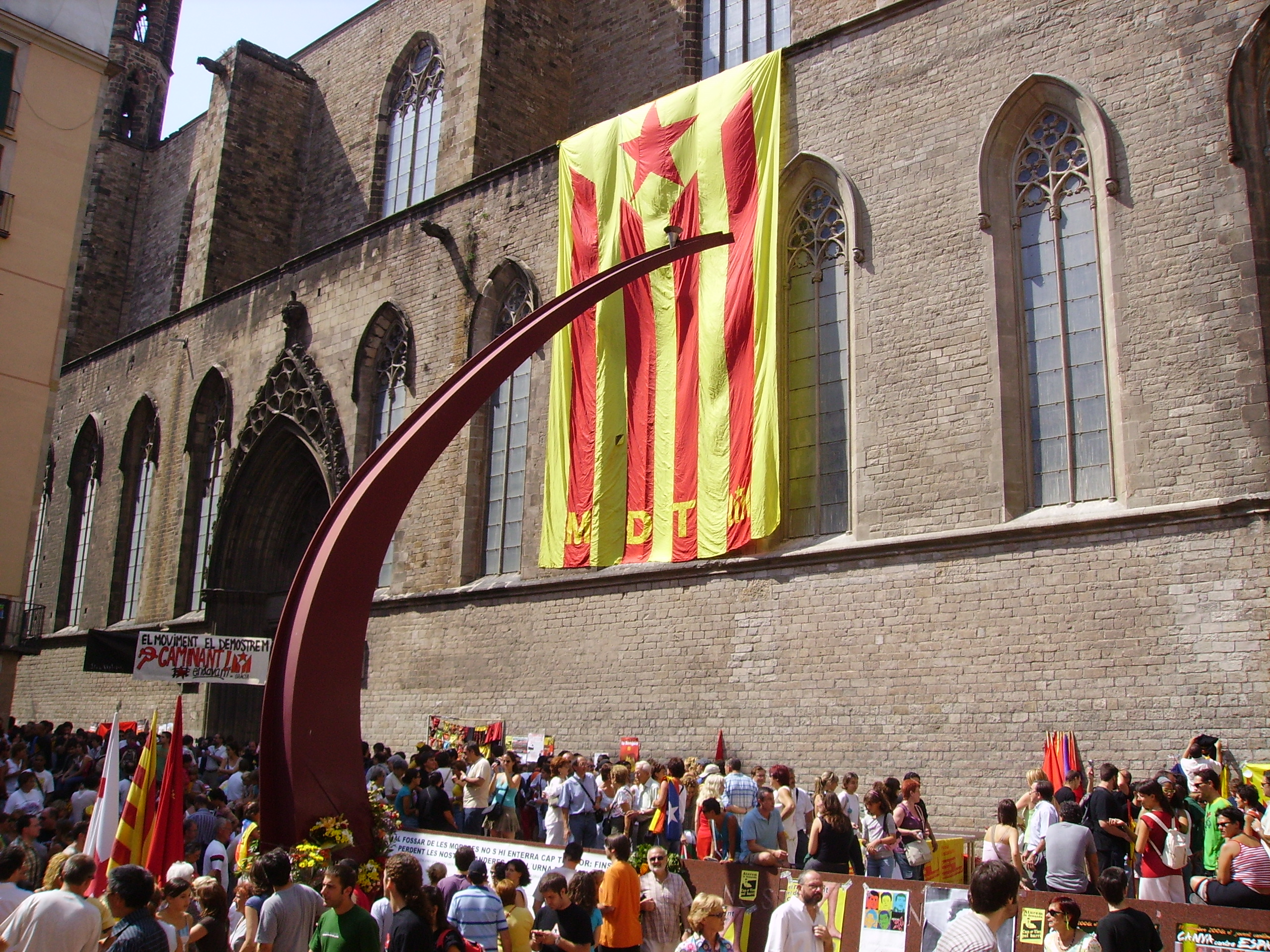
National Day of Catalonia, 2006

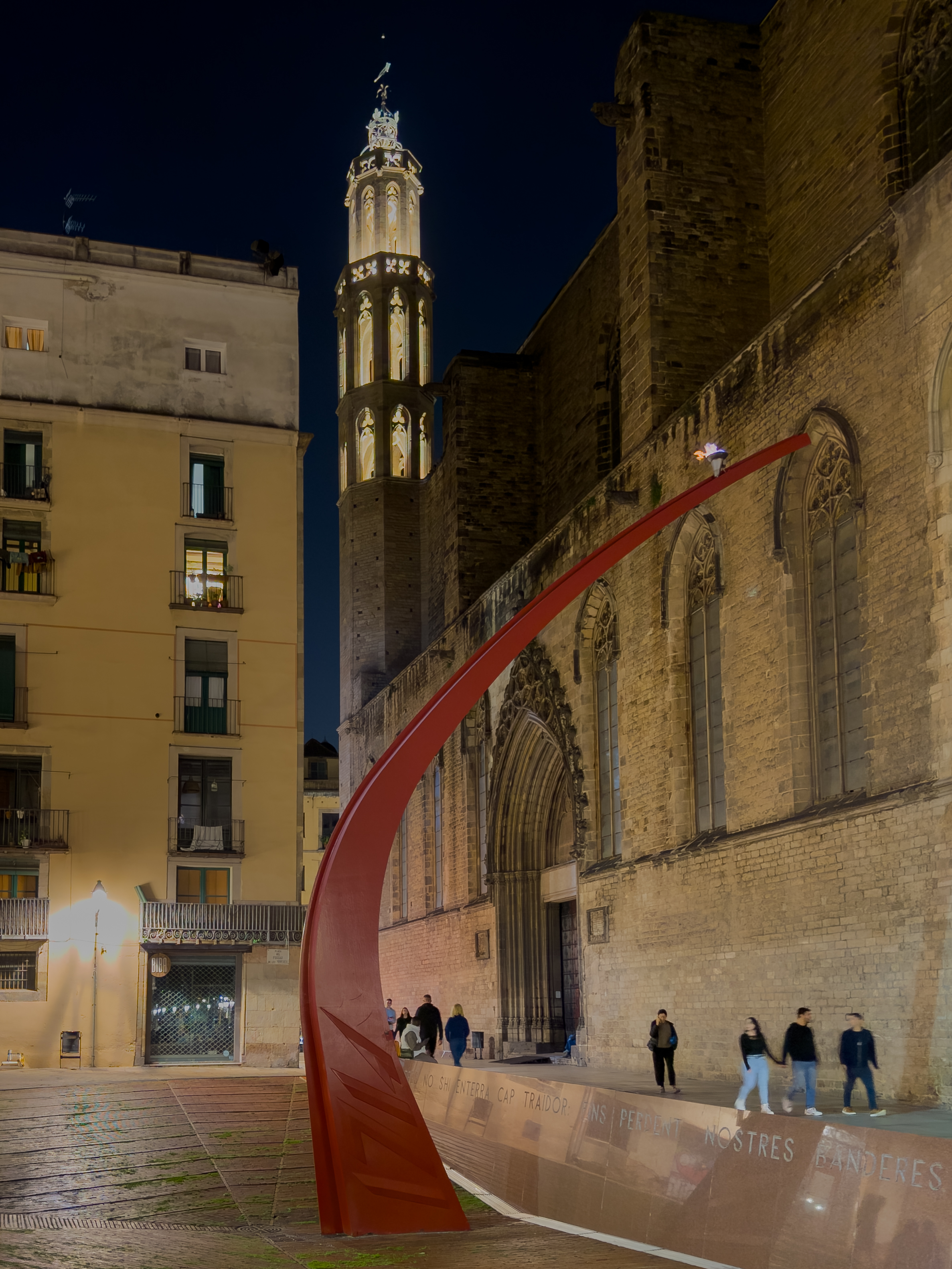
At night

The Fossar de les Moreres (Catalan pronunciation: [fuˈsa ðə ləz muˈɾeɾəs], literally "Grave of the Mulberries") is a memorial square in Barcelona (Catalonia, Spain), adjacent to the basilica of Santa Maria del Mar. The plaza was built over a cemetery where defenders of the city were buried following the Siege of Barcelona at the end of the War of the Spanish Succession in 1714. The plaza features a memorial to the fallen Catalans of the war, with a torch of eternal flame and a heroic poem by Frederic Soler, "El Fossar de les Moreres".

In the aftermath of the War of Spanish Succession, Catalonia suffered the loss of its independence. The subsequent royal decrees known as the Decretos de Nueva Planta abolished the furs (fueros) of Catalonia as well as institutions that dated back to the time of the Crown of Aragon and beyond. At a later date the public use of the Catalan language was banned for public documents. The Decretos dealt not only with Catalonia, but also with other parts of Spain and the empire as a whole.

Given this history connected with the decrees and the war, the Fossar de les Moreres is a place of remembrance every year during the National Day of Catalonia (Diada Nacional de Catalunya in Catalan). The holiday commemorates the date on which Barcelona fell, 11 September, and Catalans yearly pay homage to the defenders of the city who were killed and are buried at the memorial.[1]

== See also ==
- History of Catalonia
- Decrets de Nova Planta
- Catalan nationalism
- Mercat del Born
