= Army of Catalonia (1713–14) =

Catalan forces during the War of the Spanish Succession

Army of the Principality of Catalonia Exèrcit del Principat de Catalunya
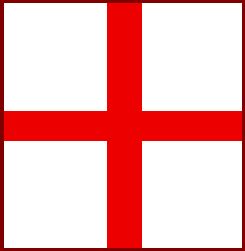
- Saint George's Cross
- Active: 1713–1714
- Country: Principality of Catalonia
- Allegiance: Charles III of Spain
- Size: 13,000 regular
- Patron: Saint George
- Motto: Privilegis o Mort ("Privileges or Death")
- Colours: Blue & red
- Engagements: See list: War of Spanish Succession War of the Catalans Siege of Barcelona (1713-1714) Naval battle of Barcelona (1714) Battle of Talamanca

Commanders
- Current commander: Antoni de Villarroel

The Army of the Principality of Catalonia (Catalan: Exèrcit del Principat de Catalunya) was the army raised by the Junta de Braços of Catalonia (assembly of members of the Catalan Courts without the king) on 9 July 1713 after the Peace of Utrecht and the withdrawal of the Imperial Army by the L'Hospitalet Agreement. The army was made up of 10,000 infantry, 1,600 cavalry and 1,000 naval troops. It is not known how many men formed the artillery unit but it did not exceed 700. In total, the army contained 13,000 regular troops.

On 9 July 1713 the Principality of Catalonia declared war on the Kingdom of France and the Duke of Anjou (Philip V of Spain), since the Catalan constitutions of 1706 did not recognize him as the legitimate king of the Monarchy of Spain. The next day, it published a ban to remove troops from the Army of Catalonia, the first units being the Regiment of the Deputation of the General of Catalonia and the Regiment of the City of Barcelona. For the position of general commander of the Army, they appointed Lieutenant Marshal Antoni de Villarroel i Peláez on 10 July. The artillery and the Cavalry Regiment of the Faith were financed by the merchant Amador Dalmau and Colom, as well as two ships for the Navy.

== Infantry ==
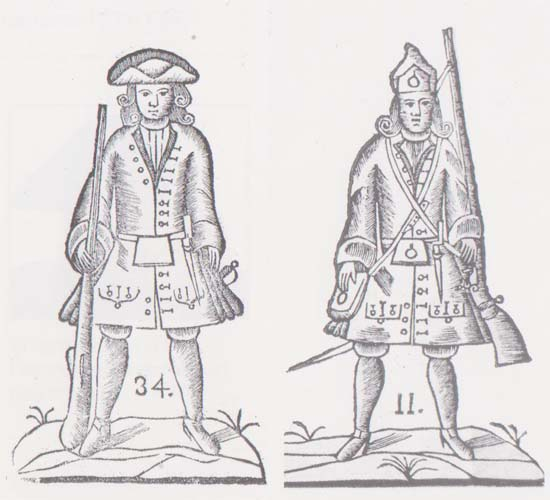
Dibuix del manual "Practical and speculative practice of the rifleman, and grenadier" del coronel Juan Francisco Ferrer. Imprès a Mallorca l'any 1714. Amb aquesta imatge podem imaginar-nos com anaven vestides les tropes catalanes.

The formation of the Army of Catalonia in total had 10,000 men of regular infantry and was based on two regiments of already existing infantry. From these, up to eight new regiments of regulated infantry were raised, taking advantage of the soldiers and experienced officers who had remained in Catalonia after the withdrawal of the allied armies.

- Regiment de la Diputació del General de Catalunya
- Regiment de la Ciutat de Barcelona
- Regiment de la Immaculada Concepció
- Regiment de Santa Eulàlia
- Regiment d'Infanteria de la Mare de Déu dels Desemparats
- Regiment de Sant Narcís
- Regiment de Nostra Senyora del Roser
- Regiment del coronel Busquets

The colonelcies were the urban militias of the main cities of Catalonia during the early modern period: Coronela de Barcelona, Coronela de Lleida, Coronela de Tortosa, Coronela de Tarragona o coronela de Manresa, cities that sheltered them Catalan constitutions enjoyed autonomy to arm themselves and defend themselves in case of aggression. They were formed by militarized citizens of the guilds Offices Even so, the Coroneles and mercenary troops such as miquelets were not included in the army, the troops had to be professional and well-armed.

== Cavalry ==
The cavalry, in the first moments of the formation of the Army of Catalonia, were of high strategic importance. Thanks to its high mobility, the Catalan authorities hoped to use it to avoid the collapse of important sites in Bourbon hands and open fronts in the interior of Catalonia. This branch was composed of six regiments, which were formed or reordered, as well as other companies, such as the hússars hongaresos, surely framed in Sant Jordi.

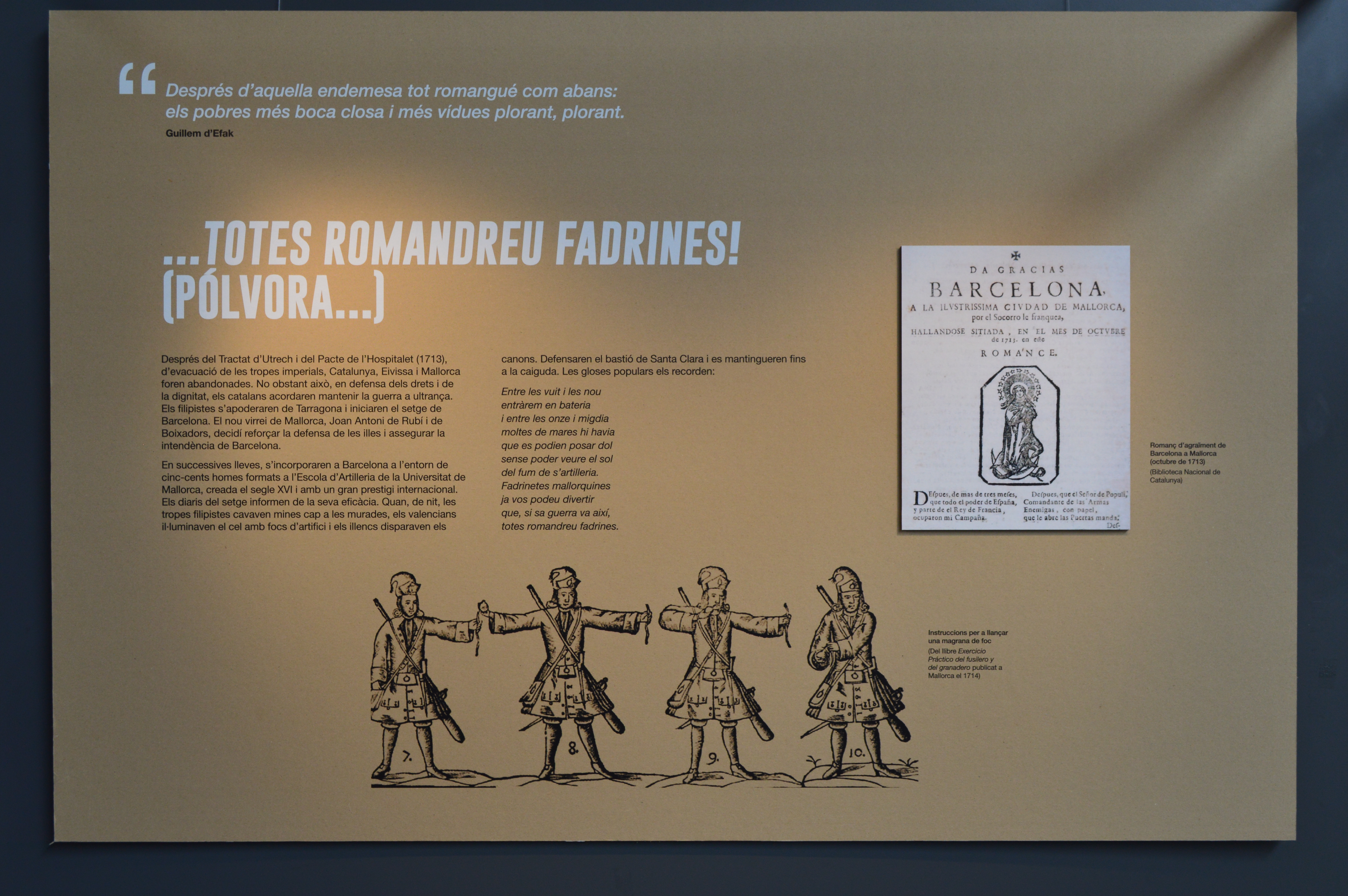
Plafó de l'exposició del Born Centre Cultural, The end of the Kingdom in the middle of the Sea, where the Majorcan participation is explained.

- Regiment de cavalleria Rafael Nebot
- Regiment of cavalry La Fe
- Regiment of cavalry Sant Jordi
- Regiment de cavalleria Dragons-Cuirassers de Sant Miquel
- Regiment of cavalry Sant Jaume
- Regiment of cavalry Pere de Bricfeus
- Company of cavalry of Jordi Badia

== Artillery ==
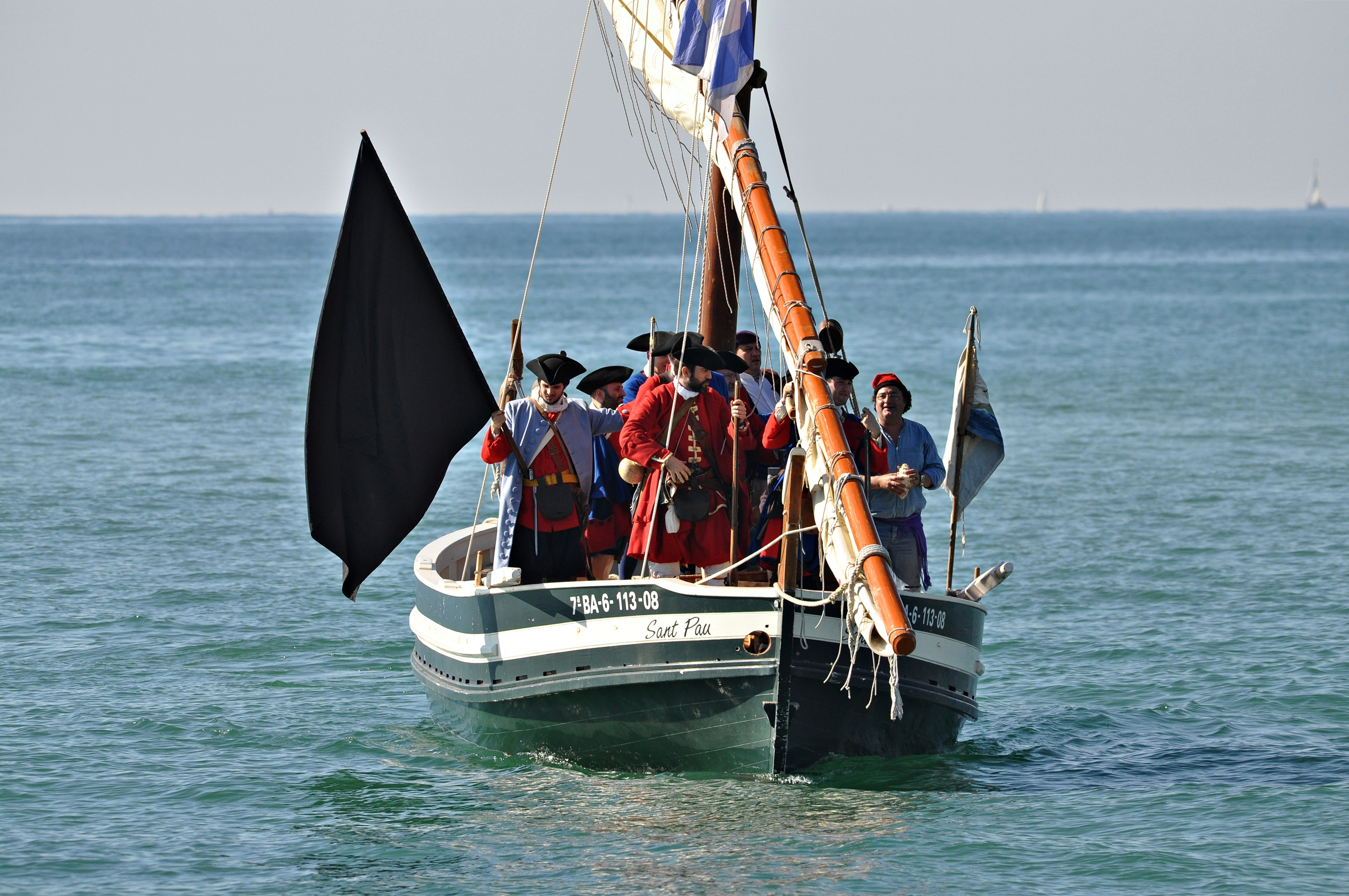
Recreació del 2014 del desembarcament de l'Expedició del Braç Militar a Arenys de Mar del 9 d'agost de 1713.

The artillery was organized in a regimental unit under the command of Valencian general Joan Baptista Basset, who also commanded the engineers. Deployed in Barcelona, the gunners had an important artillery park with pieces of bronze of good quality. The artillery companies were primarily made up of Majorcan artillerymen and bombers, of a very high reputation, who were already experienced in fighting against the Ottomans.

- Artillery of Catalonia (5 companies)

== Navy ==
In addition to other small and medium-sized boats and boats, the Navy of Catalonia had three large vessels: the Mare de Déu de la Mercè and Santa Eulàlia, led by Miquel Vaquer, the Sant Francesc of Paula, with Captain Josep Tauler and Santa Madrona, a captured French frigate placed under the command of Josep Capó. Like reinforcement to the crews of the Navy 200 orphan guys, from the House of Charity of Barcelona, they were gotten up to the ships.

- (Originally 80 gun-ship, fought at war without refilling it with cannons) line ship San Francesc de Paula
- 72 gun ship of the line Nostra Senyora de la Mercè
- 72 gun ship of the line Santa Madrona
- 40 guns frigate-ship of line Sant Josep
- 6 frigates
- 9 brigs
- 50 tartanas de guerra

== Bibliography ==
- Albertí i Gubern, S. L'Onze de setembre (Barcelona, 2006) ISBN 84-7246-059-2
- Bruguera, M. Historia del memorable sitio y bloqueo de Barcelona y heroica defensa de los fueros y privilegios de Cataluña en 1713 y 1714 (1871)
- Cerro Nargáñez, Rafael (2004). Felipe V y su tiempo : Congreso Internacional. Zaragoza: Institución Fernando el Católico. ISBN 84-7820-767-8.
- Esteve Perendreu, Francesc (2007). Mestrescoles i rectors de l 'Estudi General de Lleida (1597-1717) (in Catalan). Universitat de Lleida. ISBN 978-84-8409-454-8.
- Hernàndez, Francesc Xavier; Riart, Francesc (2014). "Los últimos austracistas. El ejército de Cataluña". Desperta Ferro: Historia moderna. 10: 14–19. ISSN 2255-0542.
- Hernàndez, F. Xavier; Riart, Francesc (2007). Els exèrcits de Catalunya 1713-1714 : uniformes, equipaments i organització. Barcelona: Rafael Dalmau. ISBN 978-84-232-0713-8.
- Jordà i Fernàndez, Antoni (2006). Història de la ciutat de Tarragona. [Valls]: Cossetània. ISBN 8497912276.
