= La Coronela =

La Coronela (Catalan pronunciation: [lə kuɾuˈnɛlə]) was the name of the armed force of the town of Barcelona, and its objective was to defend the city during the War of the Spanish Succession. It was formed, in great part, by craftsmen and organized under the commandment of the Conseller en cap (Head councillor, in Catalan) of the Consell de Cent of Barcelona.

It played a crucial role in the defense of the city against the Bourbon troops from 1710 to 1714, specially since the Archduke Charles went to Vienna in 1713, abandoning his supporters to their own luck.

== Military organization ==
Some sources point that about 4,000 soldiers of La Coronela defended the city during the Siege of Barcelona. They were organized in 6 battalions with a total of 48 companies, and each company contained between 80 and 90 armsmen.

== See also ==
- Siege of Barcelona (1713–1714)
- Barcelona
- Rafael Casanova
- Antonio de Villarroel i Peláez
- General Moragues
- Francesc de Castellví i Obando
