= Antoni de Villarroel =

Spanish military commander (1656-1726)

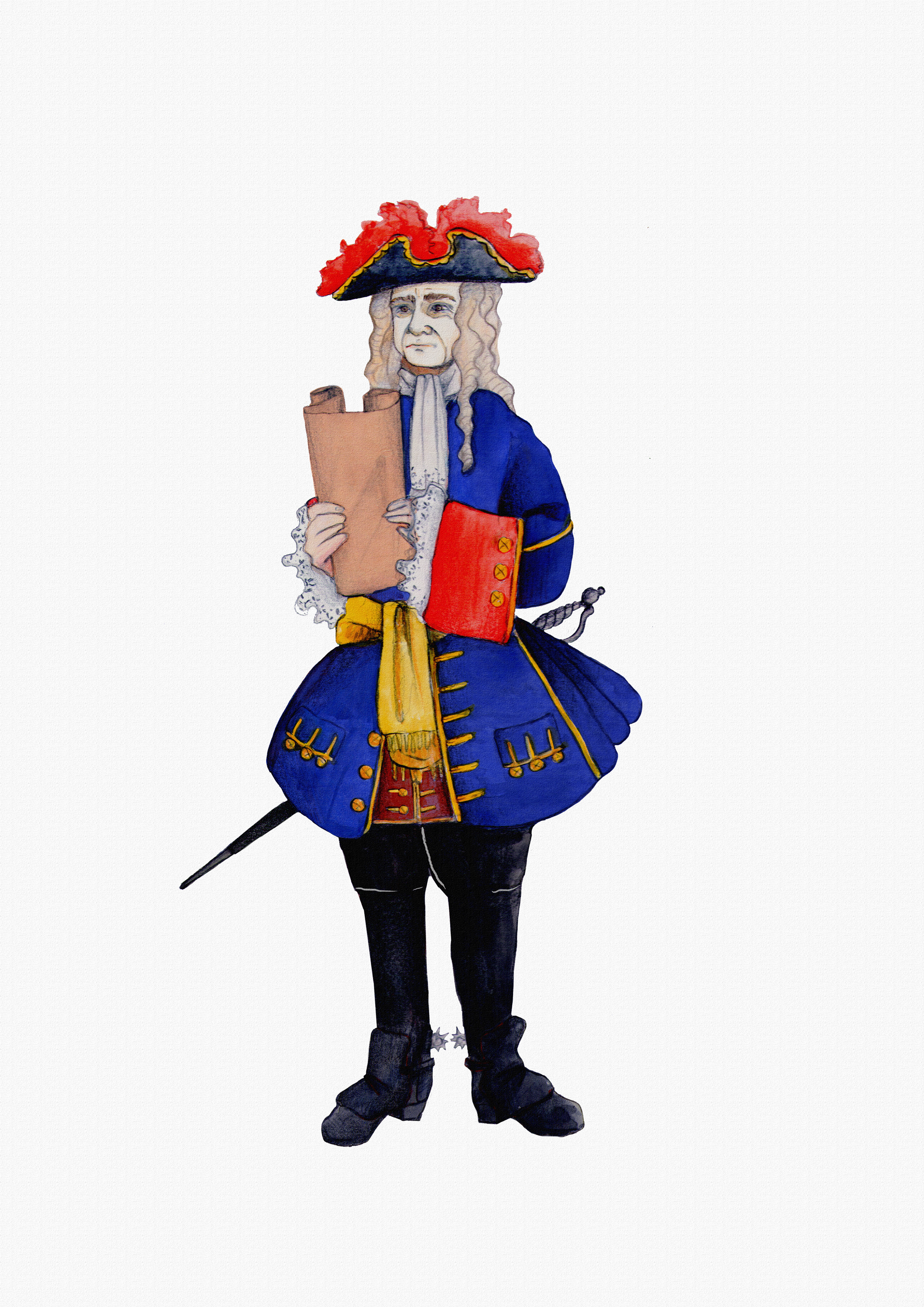
Actual depiction of Villarroel with his full militar suit which he wore during 1713-1714 campaign as a chief of the Catalan army.

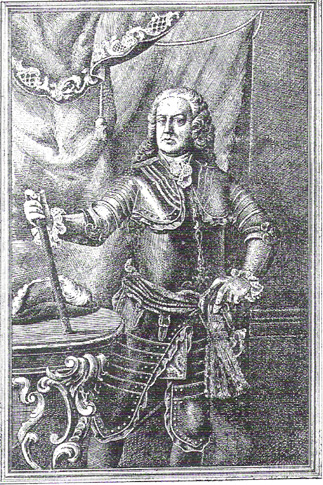
Artistic depiction of the 19th century.

Antonio de Villarroel y Pelaez (1656, Barcelona – 1726, A Coruña) was a Spanish military commander in the service of Philip V of Spain until 1710 in the War of the Spanish Succession. After the disgrace of Philippe II, Duke of Orléans, under whom he served and who plotted to replace Philip V, he switched sides to fight for the Habsburg pretender to the Spanish throne Charles VI, Holy Roman Emperor, keeping his rank. In 1713 he was appointed general commander of the Army of Catalonia.

== Military career ==
He joined the Spanish army at a very young age, and in 1697, he defended Barcelona against a French army. At the beginning of the War of Spanish Succession, he fought with the army of Philip V of Spain, but the fall from grace of the Duke of Orléans forced him to flee to Galicia where he joined the Allied anti-Bourbon league. He was there appointed a deputy marshal for the Archduke Charles VI.

Once in the service of the Habsburgs, he distinguished himself in the Battle of Villaviciosa and in the thankless task of evacuation of Aragon in 1711. In recognition of his accomplishments, he was appointed supreme commander of the forces of Catalonia and was charged with organizing city defenses in the 1713-14 Siege of Barcelona. With just over 5,000 men, of whom about 3,500 were members of the guild militia, Villarroel was forced to defend the city against the 40,000 French and Spanish army of Phillip V. As the summer of 1714 passed, desperate times in Barcelona forced Villarroel to attempt to force an exit of the city. The attempted exit was repulsed by the Duke of Berwick who had replaced the Duke of Popoli as commander of the besiegers. By September, the Franco-Spanish forces had opened a sizable breach in the walls and the city counselors pleaded with Villarroel to capitulate the city to the Duke of Berwick. Refusing to surrender the city, Villarroel continued defending the city until he was injured, whereupon the city was officially surrendered to the forces of Phillip V. Despite assurances given contrary to the fact, the 25 military commanders of Barcelona's defenses, including Villarroel, were all imprisoned.

== Imprisonment and death ==
Villarroel was imprisoned first in the castle of Alicante and later (1715) in A Coruña, where he died (22 February 1726). He spent his last years confined in a cell that flooded with the rising tide, a circumstance that caused a total paralysis of his two legs. The actual date of his death was discovered by Josep Catà and Antoni Muñoz in 2009. Until then, it was considered that Villarroel had been released from the Alcazar of Segovia following the peace of Vienna and had lived in the pension that would have granted, until his death, the Archduke Charles Emperor of the Holy Roman Empire.

== Legacy ==
A street in the l'Eixample district of modern Barcelona is named after Villarroel.

In the 2014 historical novel Victus of the Catalan writer Albert Sánchez Piñol, about the War of the Spanish Succession and specially the Siege of Barcelona, Villarroel is portrayed as the true hero of the Barcelona defense.
