= Jorge de Verboom, 1st Marquess of Verboom =

The Most Illustrious The Marquess of Verboom
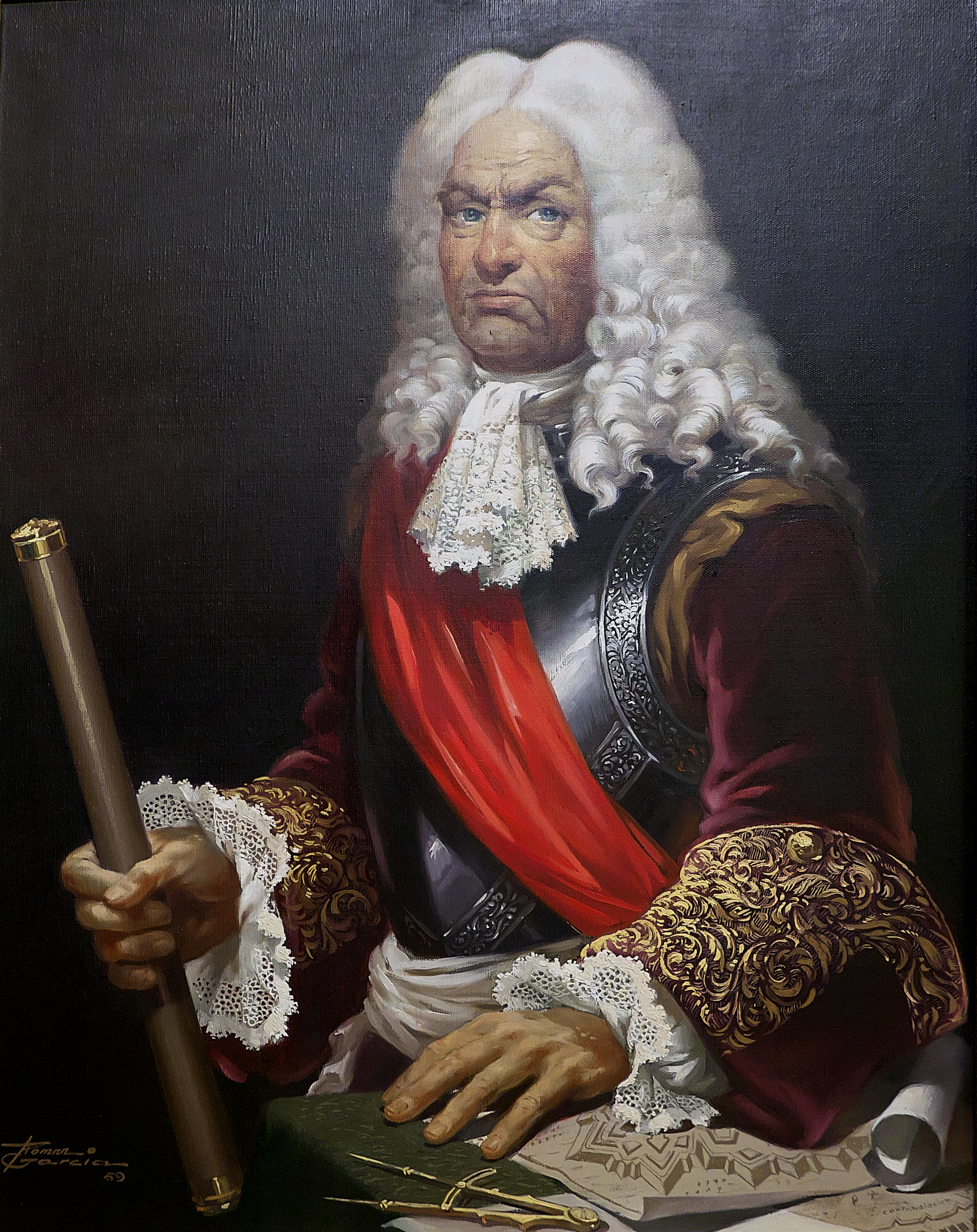
- Portrait by Román García Rodrigo, 1959
- Born: George Prosper Verboom; 9 January 1665; Brussels, Spanish Netherlands
- Died: 19 January 1744 (aged 79) Barcelona, Spain
- Allegiance: Spain
- Branch: Spanish Army
- Rank: Lieutenant general
- Conflicts: War of the Spanish Succession; Battle of Ekeren; Battle of Ramillies; Battle of Almenar; Anglo-Spanish War; Thirteenth siege of Gibraltar

Lieutenant-General Jorge Próspero de Verboom, 1st Marquess of Verboom (born George Prosper Verboom; 9 January 1665 – 19 January 1744) was a Spanish Army officer who served as the Captain General of Catalonia from 1737 to 1738. A prominent military engineer in the Spanish army, Philip V of Spain granted him the aristocratic title of "Marquess of Verboom" on 9 January 1727.

== Early life ==
George Prosper Verboom was born on 9 January 1665 in Brussels, Spanish Netherlands. His father was Cornelius Verboom, a Flemish military engineer in Spanish service who was in charge of the fortification of Free City of Besançon and of Dole, Jura in France.

== Education ==
Verboom obtained a theoretical and practical military education by joining the first modern Royal Military and Mathematics Academy of Brussels (opened in 1675) under the mentorship of Sebastián Fernández de Medrano, sole-director of the Royal Military and Mathematics Academy of Brussels. He completed his training as an engineer at the Royal Academy of Brussels and, after Medrano became blind, he helped his mentor in his teaching and writing, even illustrating some of Medrano's academic books.

== Career ==
During the Nine Years' War, Verboom was instrumental in the 1691 campaign by William III of England against the French siege of Mons. In 1695, he directed the siege of Namur with Dutch States Army engineer Menno van Coehoorn. He was promoted to field marshal of the Spanish cavalry and, two years later, commanded the Lorraine Regiment of Cavalry.

In the Spanish War of Succession, Verboom was in command of Antwerp's defenses in 1702. He also took part in the siege of Hulst along with Captain General Isidro de la Cueva-Benavides. In 1706, a Franco-Spanish army under the command of François de Neufville, 2nd Duke of Villeroy was defeated by Grand Alliance troops led by John Churchill, 1st Duke of Marlborough at the Battle of Ramillies. Troops from Antwerp were used to put pressure on the Grand Alliance forces at the siege of Termonde. In 1709, Verboom was instructed to report on the state of castles and garrisons along the Spain–Portugal border.

He was promoted to lieutenant general on 18 December 1709, and a few days later engineer general of the Royal Armies:

"...of all Armies, towns and fortifications in all my kingdoms, towns or states, wherever they might be located."

He participated in the Battle of Almenar of 1710 against Count Guido Starhemberg, where he was captured. He was imprisoned until 1712. He took a very active part in the conquest of Barcelona and—after its capture—moved there in 1718, where he would supervise work on the Ciudadela of Barcelona and take part in planning the War of the Quadruple Alliance – to recover Sardinia and Sicily. He took on the role of acting Captain General of Catalonia between 1737 and 1738.

== Death ==
Verboom died on 17 January 1744, in Barcelona, Spain at the age of 79. The Most Excellent Marquess was buried at the Real Convento de Santa Catalina.
