= Siege of Barcelona (1713–1714) =

Part of the War of the Spanish Succession

Coordinates: 41.4019°N 2.1667°E

- Part of the War of the Catalans and the War of the Spanish Succession
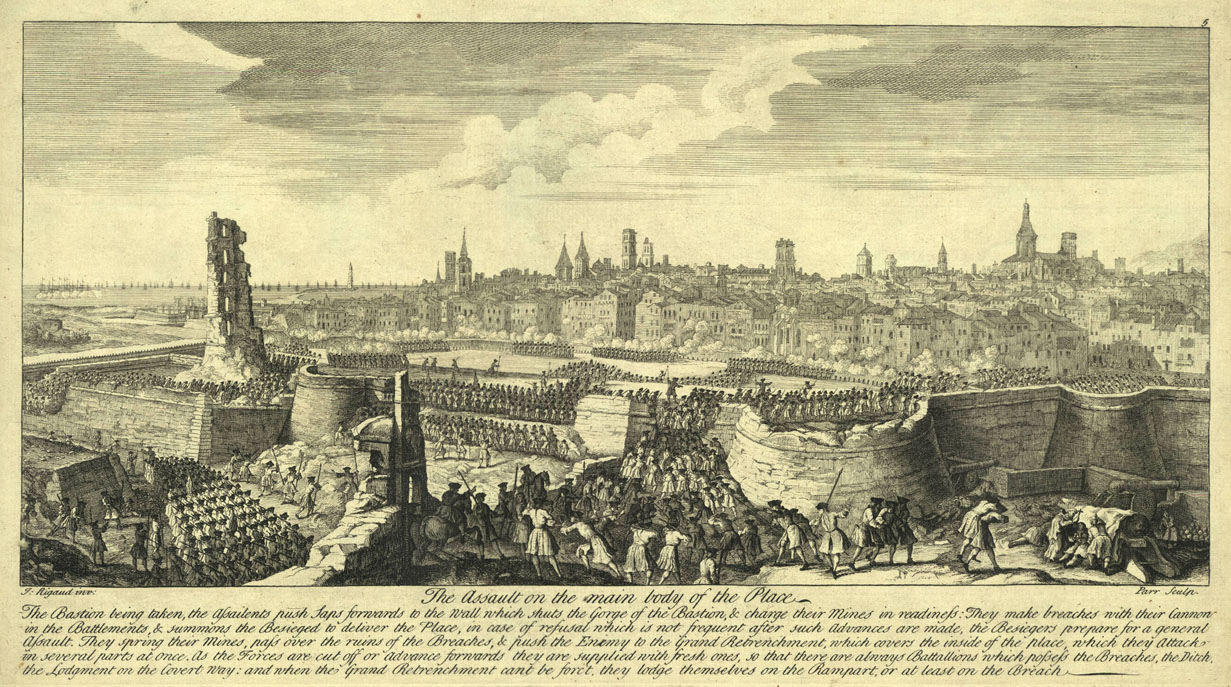
| Date | 25 July 1713 – 11 September 1714 |
| Location | Barcelona, Principality of Catalonia (Spain) |
| Result | Bourbon victory |

Belligerents
| Pro-Bourbon Spain; Kingdom of France | Pro-Habsburg Spain; Principality of Catalonia |

Commanders and leaders
| Duke of Popoli; Kingdom of France Duke of Berwick | Antoni de Villarroel; Rafael Casanova |

Strength
| 40,000 regulars 80 cannons 20 howitzers | 20,000 regulars of the Army of Catalonia; 4,700 militians of the Coronela; Some pieces of artillery |

Casualties and losses
| 10,000 dead or wounded | 13,000 dead or wounded |

The siege of Barcelona (Catalan: Setge de Barcelona, IPA: [ˈsedʒə ðə βəɾsəˈlonə]) was a 13-month battle at the end of the War of Spanish Succession, which pitted Archduke Charles of Austria (backed by Great Britain and the Netherlands, i.e. the Grand Alliance) against Philip V of Spain, backed by France in a contest for the Spanish crown. The capitulation of Barcelona represented the fall of the last pro-Habsburg stronghold in the Iberian Peninsula, as well as the end of the independent political status (within the framework of a composite monarchy) of the Principality of Catalonia.

== Prelude ==
At the end of the century, after the death of the childless Charles II (1700), the Crown of Spain went to his chosen successor, Philip V of the House of Bourbon. The Grand Alliance of Austria, England, and the Dutch Republic gave military support to a Habsburg claimant of the crown, Archduke Charles, as Charles III of Spain, resulting in the War of the Spanish Succession (1701–14). The Principality of Catalonia initially accepted Philip V following prolonged negotiations between Philip V and the General Court of Catalonia (the parliament). However, repressive measures of the viceroy Francisco de Velasco and authoritarian decisions of the king (some of them contrary to Catalan legislation), as well as the economic policy and distrust to the French absolutism caused Catalonia to switch sides.

During the early part of the war, Barcelona, the capital of Catalonia, had fallen to the forces of Archduke Charles: his fleet had anchored in the port on 22 August 1705, landing troops which surrounded the city. These troops later captured the fort of Montjuïc, and used it to bombard the city into submission on 9 October. The Principality of Catalonia, as well as the other states of the Crown of Aragon (Aragon, Valencia, and Mallorca), quickly accepted Charles III as their new monarch. Charles summoned the last General Court of Catalonia of history.

After a series of advances and stalemates between the two sides, geopolitical changes in Europe led to peace. Britain and the Dutch Republic reached a peace agreement to end the war with France on 11 April 1713, the Treaty of Utrecht. Austria reached a peace agreement to end the war with France on 7 March 1714, Treaty of Rastatt. The Holy Roman Empire reached a peace agreement to end the war with France on 7 September 1714, Treaty of Baden.

== Siege ==
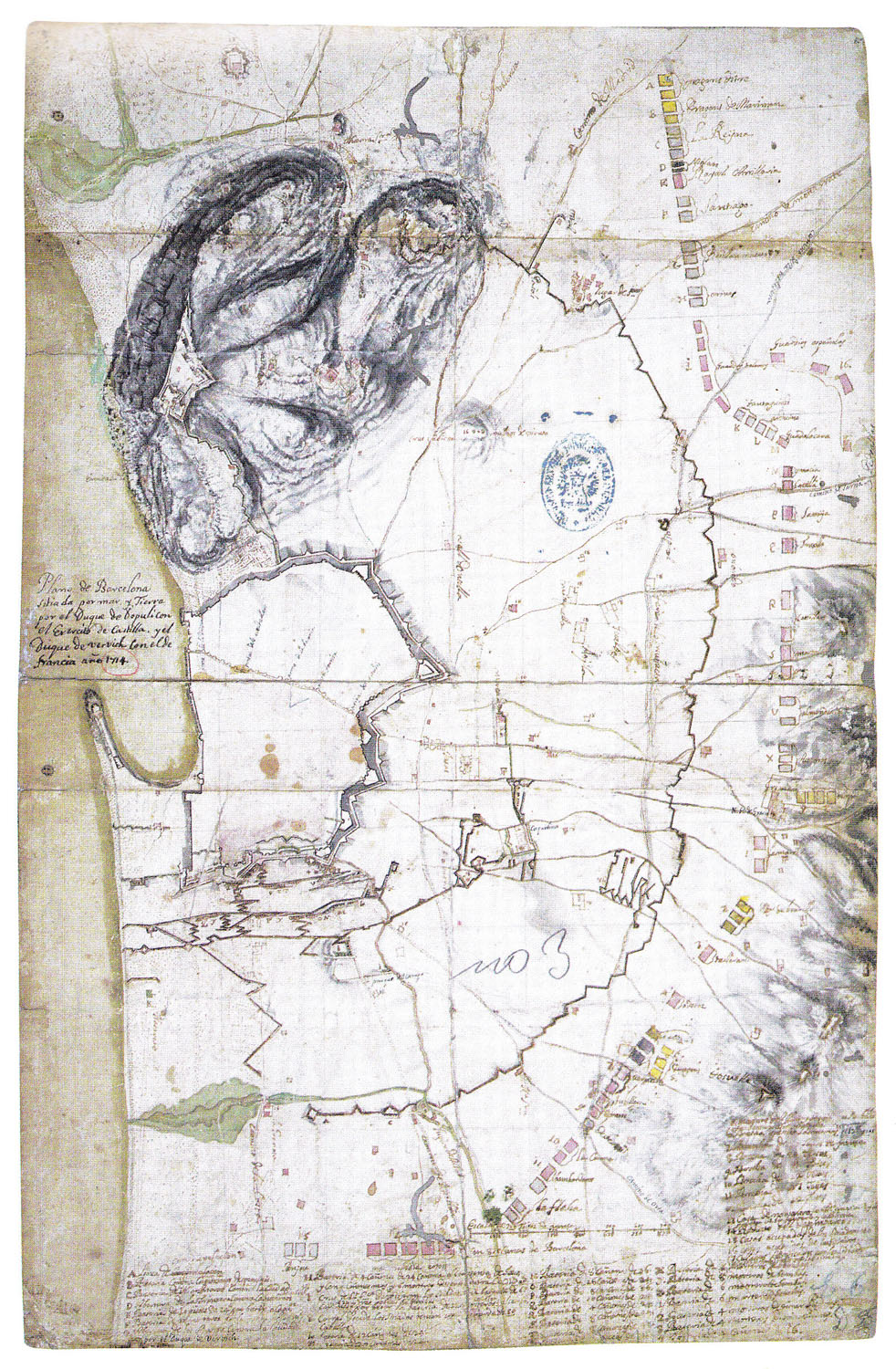
Trench system of the siege, established by the Bourbon army surrounding Barcelona

As most of the Catalan population and the political class supported the claim of the Archduke against Philip V, the Franco-Spanish forces were not strong enough to attempt a capture of the city until 1713. When the Treaty of Utrecht was signed between April and July, the Principality of Catalonia and the Kingdom of Mallorca remained the last realms in Spain of which still fought for the cause of Charles III. Despite the evacuation of the Allied armies, in July 1713 the Junta de Braços (parliamentary assembly without the king) of Catalonia opted to unilaterally remain in the war to protect Catalan constitutions, freedoms and lives from Bourbon punishment, raising the Army of Catalonia and attempting to obtain help from Britain and Austria.

By 25 July of that year, the city of Barcelona was surrounded by Bourbon forces under the command of Restaino Cantelmo-Stuart, Duke of Popoli, but attacks upon it were unfruitful due to the scarcity of artillery. The Bourbons then waited for a 20,000-man reinforcement force, which arrived in April–May 1714. Under the command of Duke of Berwick, the assault was renewed despite the efforts of the Catalans to break the siege by sending troops behind enemy lines. Thanks to the arrival of French high-caliber cannons, the Bourbon armies began the systematic bombardment of the city. The objective was not the defenses of the city but the houses and the citizens of Barcelona.

After a failed attempt to enter in the city on 30 August, the Bourbons finally triumphed on 11 September, when the assault which started at 4:30 in the morning was successful, as the wall fell in several places and the Conseller en cap and chief commander of the Coronela (the urban militia of Barcelona), Rafael Casanova, was wounded during the fight. The day was marked by fighting in the streets, led by Antoni de Villarroel, the general commander of the Army of Catalonia, who was also wounded. Finally, the Catalan leaders decided to surrender and start the negotiations about capitulation. The talks were extended until the next day, due to Philip V's desire to punish the population without any kind of agreement, but Berwick, fearing a prolonged struggle, formally agreed to respect the lives of Barcelonians.

== Aftermath ==
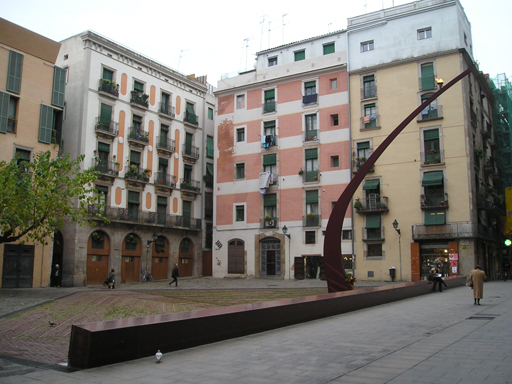
Fossar de les Moreres, Barcelona

The Catalan defeat represented the end of the Principality of Catalonia as a separate state, as its independent institutions and legislation were suppressed and replaced by Castilian ones to establish absolutism. This event is now commemorated every 11 September as the National Day of Catalonia, known in Catalan as the Diada Nacional de Catalunya. The surrender of the pro-Archduke forces to the Franco-Spanish army in 1714 marked not only the end of the war but also a significant phase in the centralization of various monarchies on the European continent, a process that had been underway for two centuries. With the War of the Spanish Succession completed, Spain evolved from a composite monarchy made up of different states to a French-style centralized realm.

The defenders of the city were buried in a cemetery, now a plaça (Catalan: square) called Fossar de les Moreres, where Catalans gather every 11 September, known as the National Day of Catalonia or la Diada. The former market hall Mercat del Born covers archaeological ruins which were part of the La Ribera district of Barcelona that was demolished after the defeat of Catalonia in 1714.

The alleged abandonment of the pro-Habsburg defenders of Barcelona was one of the criticisms made by the opponents of Robert Harley during his impeachment by the British Parliament after the war.

== Bibliography ==
- Coll i Alentorn, Miquel (1992). Història, vol.II. Publicacions de l'Abadia de Montserrat. ISBN 84-7246-079-7 – via Google Books.
- Albertí, Santiago (2006). L'Onze de Setembre. Albertí. ISBN 84-7826-299-7.
