= Restaino Cantelmo-Stuart =

Restaino Cantelmo-Stuart (1651, in Naples – 16 January 1723, in Madrid), 8th Duke of Naples, 3rd Prince of Pettorano, was a military leader from Naples in the service of Spain, best known for the Siege of Barcelona (1713–1714).

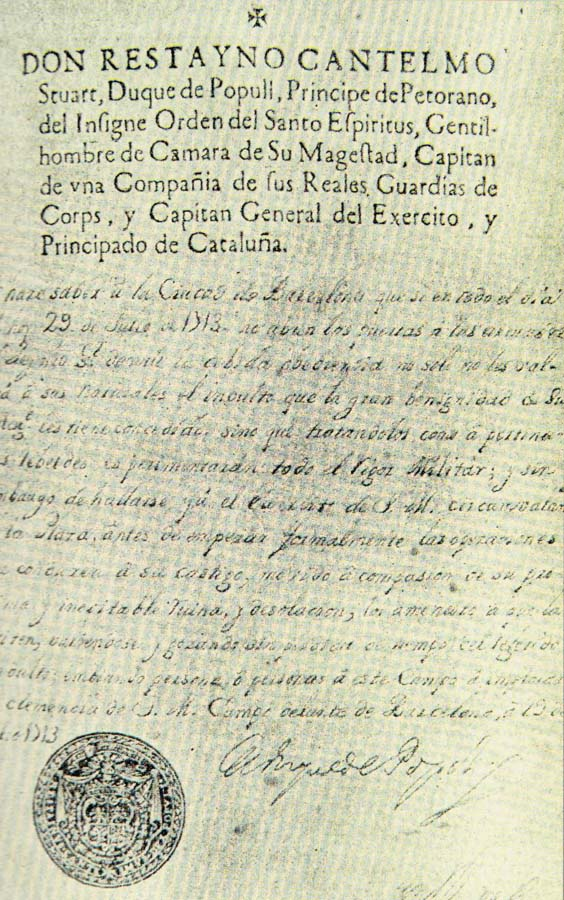
The document signed by the Duke of Pópoli on 29 July 1713, demanding the surrender of the city

== Life ==
He was the son of Fabrizio Cantelmo-Stuart, 6th Duke of Pópoli, 2nd Prince of Pettorano, and Beatriz Brancia.

In 1672, he entered in the Spanish Army as cavalry captain and was Maestre de campo of the Tercio Viejo de Infantería Italiana during the suppression of the Messina revolt (1674–1678). At the outbreak of the War of Spanish Succession, he remained loyal to Philip V of Spain.

In the first years of the war, he fought in Naples against supporters of Archduke Charles, led by Gaetano Gambacorta, Prince of Macchia.
In 1705, he was sent with his Neapolitan troops to Barcelona to defend the city under siege. But the city was surrendered and Pópoli was allowed to leave the city with his troops. In 1707, Naples was occupied by the Austrians and his domains were confiscated, only to be returned after the Treaty of Vienna (1725).

=== The Siege of Barcelona ===
In 1713, he was appointed first Captain General of Catalonia and ordered to take the last cities still recognizing Charles' authority. The city of Vic surrendered and the walls of Manresa were demolished.

He then marched on Barcelona and lay siege on 25 August, helped by troops under Marquis de los Balbases, who had evacuated Sicily under the terms of the Treaty of Utrecht. Pópoli was not able to take the city, because he had not enough means, was harassed by guerilla warfare in his rear, and was unable to cut the supply of the city over sea.

On 6 July 1714, he was replaced by the Duke of Berwick, who took the city 61 days later.

Pópoli went to Madrid and awarded the Order of the Golden Fleece. He was appointed Minister of Finance and War in 1715, and became tutor of Prince of Asturias Luis de Borbón in 1716.
