= Consell de Cent =

Governmental institution of Barcelona

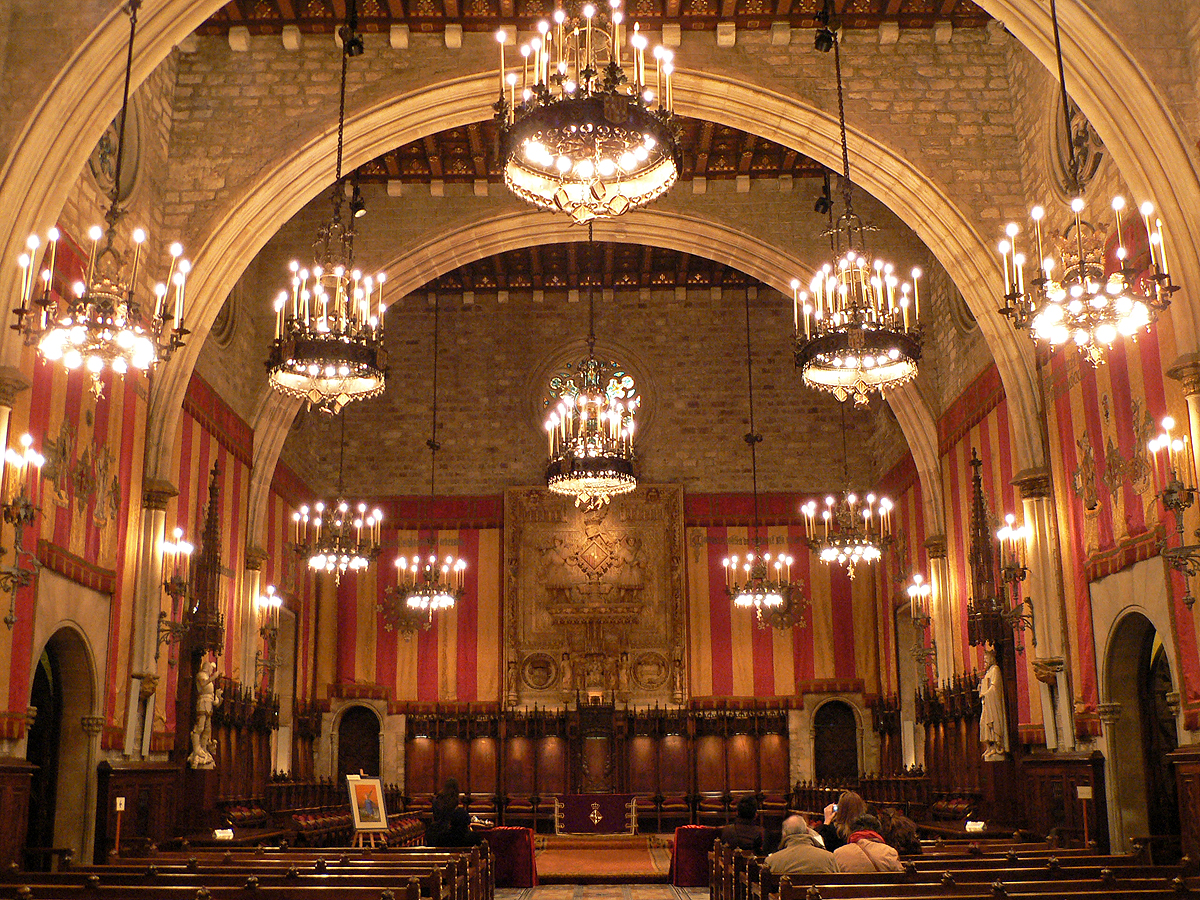
Panoramic view of the Saló de Cent

The Consell de Cent (Catalan pronunciation: [kunˈsɛʎ də ˈsen], in English "Council of One Hundred") was a governmental institution of Barcelona. It was established in the 13th century and lasted until the 18th century. Its name derives from the number of its members: one hundred (Catalan: cent).

== History ==
=== Creation ===
In 1249, James I created the fundamental structure of the municipal government of Barcelona: a board of advice of four members, helped by eight counselors and an assembly of probi homines (leaders), all them members of the mà major (Catalan for senior hand, or the upper class formed by wealthy merchants).

After several modifications, by the year 1265, the municipal organization gained its more permanent structure: the municipal authority rested on three counselors elected by a Council of one hundred individuals.

=== Importance and role ===
In year 1335, Peter III the Ceremonious permitted the Consell de Cent to use the royal insignia of the four (red) bars.

The Consell de Cent played an important role in the history and the government of the Principality of Catalonia. In 1464 it proclaimed Peter V of Aragon (known as Peter the Constable of Portugal) as count of Barcelona. In 1401 the Consell de Cent rejected Martin the Humane's foundation of the General Medical School in Barcelona with the same prerogatives as the University of Montpellier, because they felt this encroached on their municipal jurisdiction. This ultimately led to the creation of the University of Barcelona in 1450.

=== Later years and abolishment ===
In the last decades of the 17th century it was represented in the Conferència dels Tres Comuns (in Catalan: Conference of the Three Commons). The Consell de Cent was abolished by Philip V of Spain with the Decretos de Nueva Planta upon his occupation of Barcelona after the Siege of Barcelona in 1714. After that, the new government of the city was controlled directly by the monarchy.

=== Legacy ===
A main street in the city of Barcelona, the Carrer (street) del Consell de Cent, is named after this institution. (Note: Before 1978 it was known as Calle del Consejo de Ciento, in Spanish)
