= Crown of Aragon =

Composite monarchy (1137–1707/1715)

Crown of Aragon: Corona d'Aragón (Aragonese); Corona d'Aragó (Catalan); Corona Aragonum (Latin); Corona de Aragón (Spanish)
- 1137–1707/1715
- Royal flag Coat of arms

- Diachronic map of the territories subject to the Crown of Aragon
- Status: Composite monarchy
- Capital: See Capital below
- Official languages: Catalan; Aragonese; Latin; Spanish (since the 15th century)
- Co-official languages: Corsican; Italian; Neapolitan; Occitan; Sardinian; Sicilian
- Minority languages: Andalusi Arabic; Andalusi Romance; Basque; Greek; Maltese
- Religion: Majority religion: Roman Catholic (official); Minority religions: Islam, Sephardic Judaism, Greek Orthodoxy
- Government: Feudal monarchy subject to fueros
- Monarch
  - 1137–1162 (first): Ramon Berenguer IV of Barcelona
  - 1479–1516: Ferdinand II of Aragon
  - 1700–1715 (last): Philip V of Spain / Charles III (Note: Disputed due to the War of the Spanish Succession.)
- Legislature: Cortz d'Aragón; Corts Catalanes; Corts Valencianes
- Historical era: Middle Ages; Early modern period
  - Aragon–Barcelona Union: 1137
  - Conquest of the Kingdom of Majorca: 1231
  - Conquest of the Kingdom of Valencia: 1238–1245
  - Conquest of the Kingdom of Sardinia: 1324–1420
  - Union of Ferdinand II and Isabella I: 19 October 1469
  - Conquest of the Kingdom of Naples: 1501–1504
  - Nueva Planta decrees: 1707/1715

Area
- 1300: 120,000 km^{2} (46,000 sq mi)

Population
  - 1300: 1 000 000
Preceded by	Succeeded by
Kingdom of Aragon; County of Barcelona	Bourbon Spain
- Today part of: Spain; France; Italy; Malta; Greece

The Crown of Aragon (US: /-ɡɒn/) (Note: Aragonese: Corona d'Aragón [koˈɾona ðaɾaˈɣon]; Catalan: Corona d'Aragó, Catalan pronunciation: [kuˈɾonə ðəɾəˈɣo]; Spanish: Corona de Aragón [koˈɾona ðe aɾaˈɣon]; Latin: Corona Aragonum [kɔˈroːna araˈɡoːnũː].) was a medieval and early modern composite monarchy ruled by a monarch whose main title was King of Aragon, while holding at the same time other separate titles of sovereignty, such as King of Valencia and Count of Barcelona, among others. It was originated by the dynastic union of the Kingdom of Aragon and the County of Barcelona (later Principality of Catalonia) and ended as a consequence of the pro-Habsburg defeat at the War of the Spanish Succession. At the height of its power in the 14th and 15th centuries, the Crown of Aragon was a thalassocracy controlling a large portion of present-day eastern Iberian Peninsula, parts of what is now southern France, and a Mediterranean empire which included the Balearic Islands, Sicily, Corsica, Sardinia, Malta, Southern Italy (from 1442), and parts of Greece (until 1388).

The component realms of the Crown were not united politically except at the level of the king, who ruled over each autonomous state according to its own laws, raising funds under each tax structure, and dealing separately with each Corts or Cortes (parliaments), particularly in the Kingdom of Aragon, the Principality of Catalonia, and the Kingdom of Valencia. The larger Crown of Aragon must not be confused with one of its constituent parts, the Kingdom of Aragon, from which it takes its name.

In 1479, a new dynastic union of the Crown of Aragon with the Crown of Castile by the Catholic Monarchs, joining what contemporaries referred to as "the Spains", led to what would become the Spanish composite monarchy under Habsburg monarchs. The Aragonese Crown continued to exist until it was abolished by the Nueva Planta decrees issued by the Bourbon King Philip V in 1707–1716 as a consequence of the defeat of Archduke Charles (as Charles III of Aragon) in the War of the Spanish Succession.

== Context ==
The Crown of Aragon eventually included in personal union the Kingdom of Aragon, the Principality of Catalonia (until the late 12th century the County of Barcelona and others), the Kingdom of Valencia, the Kingdom of Majorca, the Kingdom of Sicily, Malta, the Kingdom of Naples and Kingdom of Sardinia. For brief periods the Crown of Aragon also controlled Montpellier, Provence, Corsica, and the twin Duchy of Athens and Neopatras in Latin Greece.

Formally, the political centre of the Crown of Aragon was Zaragoza, where kings were crowned at La Seo Cathedral. The 'de facto' capital and leading cultural, administrative and economic centre of the Crown was Barcelona, from which the most frequent royal residence was the Palau Reial Major, followed by the city of Valencia, particularly after the second third of the 15th century. Palma (Mallorca) also functioned as an additional important city and seaport.

In the Late Middle Ages, the southward territorial expansion of the Aragonese Crown in the Iberian Peninsula stopped in Murcia, which eventually consolidated as a realm of the Crown of Castile, the Kingdom of Murcia. Subsequently, the Aragonese Crown focused on the Mediterranean, governing as far afield as Greece and the Barbary Coast. In contrast, Portugal, which completed its southward expansion in 1249, would focus on the Atlantic Ocean. Mercenaries from the territories in the Crown, known as Almogavars participated in the creation of this Mediterranean empire, and later found employment in countries all across southern Europe.

The Crown of Aragon has been considered an empire which ruled in the Mediterranean for centuries, with thalassocratic power to setting rules over the entire sea, (as documented, for instance, in the Llibre del Consolat del Mar or Book of the Consulate of the Sea, written in Catalan, is one of the oldest compilations of maritime laws in the world). However, the different territories were only connected through the monarch's person. A modern historian, Juan de Contreras y Lopez de Ayala, marquis of Lozoya, described the Crown of Aragon as being more like a confederacy than a centralised kingdom.

Catalan-Aragonese Crown (Catalan: Corona Catalanoaragonesa) is a historiographical term dating from the 19th-21st centuries; it has been used to highlight the political, economic, and cultural prominence of Catalonia, and to distinguish the Crown of Aragon from other monarchies that were less pluralistic and more centralized. Despite the term's artificial nature, it is considered valid, much like other, uncontroversial historiographical terms such as the "Asturian-Leonese Kingdom", the "Castilian-Leonese Monarchy", or the Byzantine Empire. Furthermore, it serves as a practical term for understanding the material reality of the Crown (being both Aragonese and Catalans the founders), and allowing to include Valencians and Balearics too, who were encompassed by the demonym "Catalans", particularly from an external perspective between the 13th and the 16th centuries.

== History ==
=== Origin ===
Ramon Berenguer IV, count of Barcelona and prince of Aragon (1131-1162). Genealogies of the counts of Barcelona [ca] (15-16th centuries, copy from the original of 1380), manuscript 246, p. 34

The Crown of Aragon originated in 1137, when the Kingdom of Aragon and the County of Barcelona (along with the County of Provence, Girona, Cerdanya, Osona, and other territories) merged by dynastic union upon the marriage of Petronilla of Aragon and Ramon Berenguer IV of Barcelona; their individual titles combined in the person of their son Alfonso II of Aragon, who ascended to the throne in 1162. This union respected the existing institutions and parliaments of both territories. The combined realm was initially known between 1286 and 1291 as Regno, Dominio et Corona Aragonum et Catalonie ("Kingdom, Domain and Crown of Aragon and Catalonia"), and later as Corona Regum Aragoniae, Corona Aragonum or simply Aragon.

Petronilla's father King Ramiro, "The Monk" (reigned 1134–1137) who was raised in the Monastery of Saint Pons de Thomières, Viscounty of Béziers as a Benedictine monk was the youngest of three brothers. His brothers Peter I (reigned 1094–1104) and Alfonso I El Batallador (The Battler, reigned 1104–1134) had fought against Castile for hegemony in the Iberian peninsula. Upon the death of Alfonso I, the Aragonese nobility that campaigned close to him feared being overwhelmed by the influence of Castile. And so, Ramiro was forced to leave his monastic life and proclaim himself King of Aragon. He married Agnes, sister of the Duke of Aquitaine and betrothed his only daughter Petronilla of Aragon to Ramon Berenguer IV, Count of Barcelona. The wedding agreement provided Berenguer with the title of Princeps Aragonum and Dominator Aragonensis (Ruler of the Kingdom and Commander of the Aragonese Military) but the title of King of Aragon was reserved for Ramiro II and Berenguer's future sons.

Raymond Berenguer IV, the first ruler of the united dynasty, called himself Count of Barcelona and Prince (sovereign) of Aragon.

=== Expansion ===
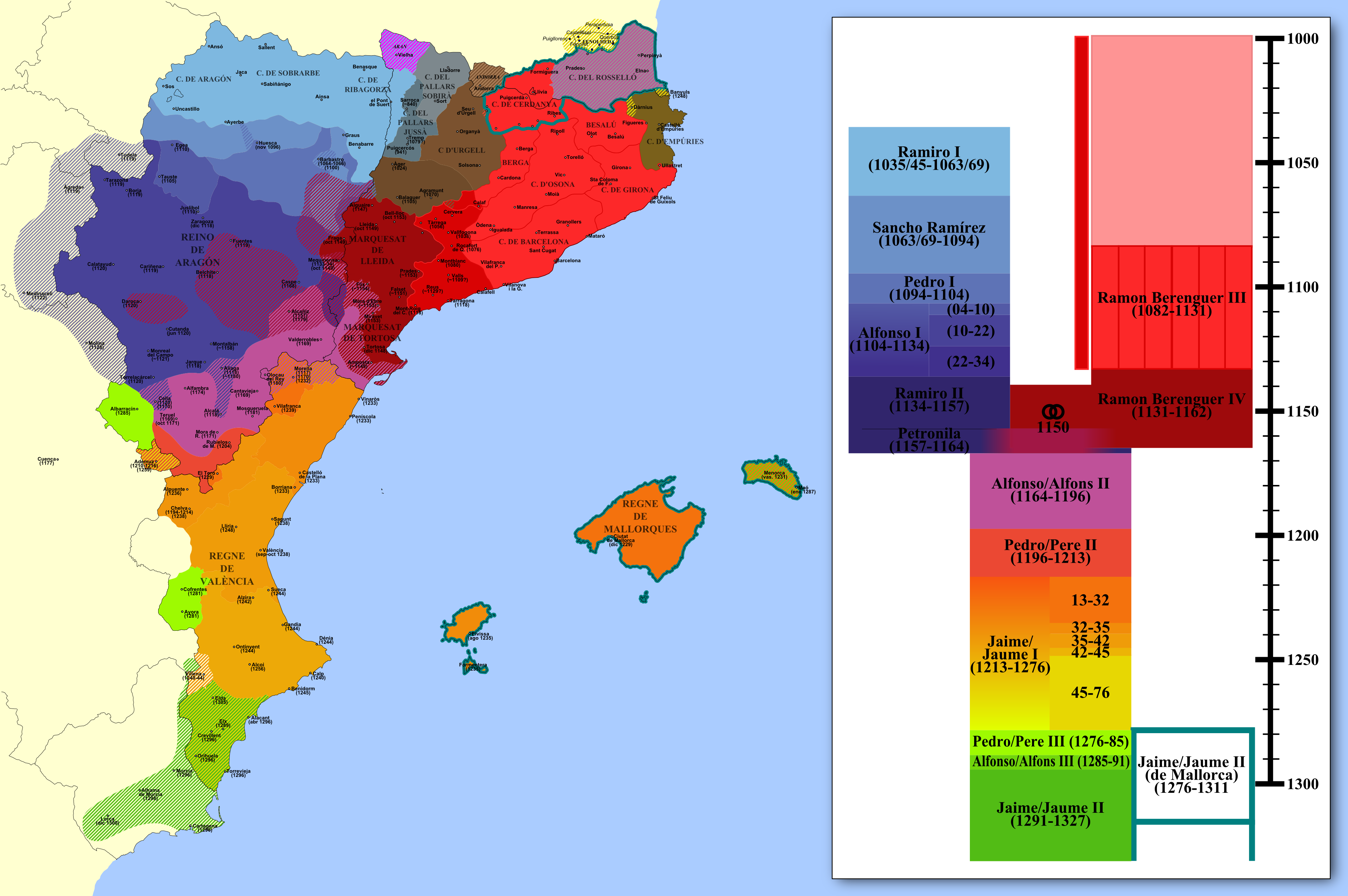
Territorial expansion of the Crown of Aragon between 11th and 14th centuries in the Iberian Peninsula and Balearic Islands

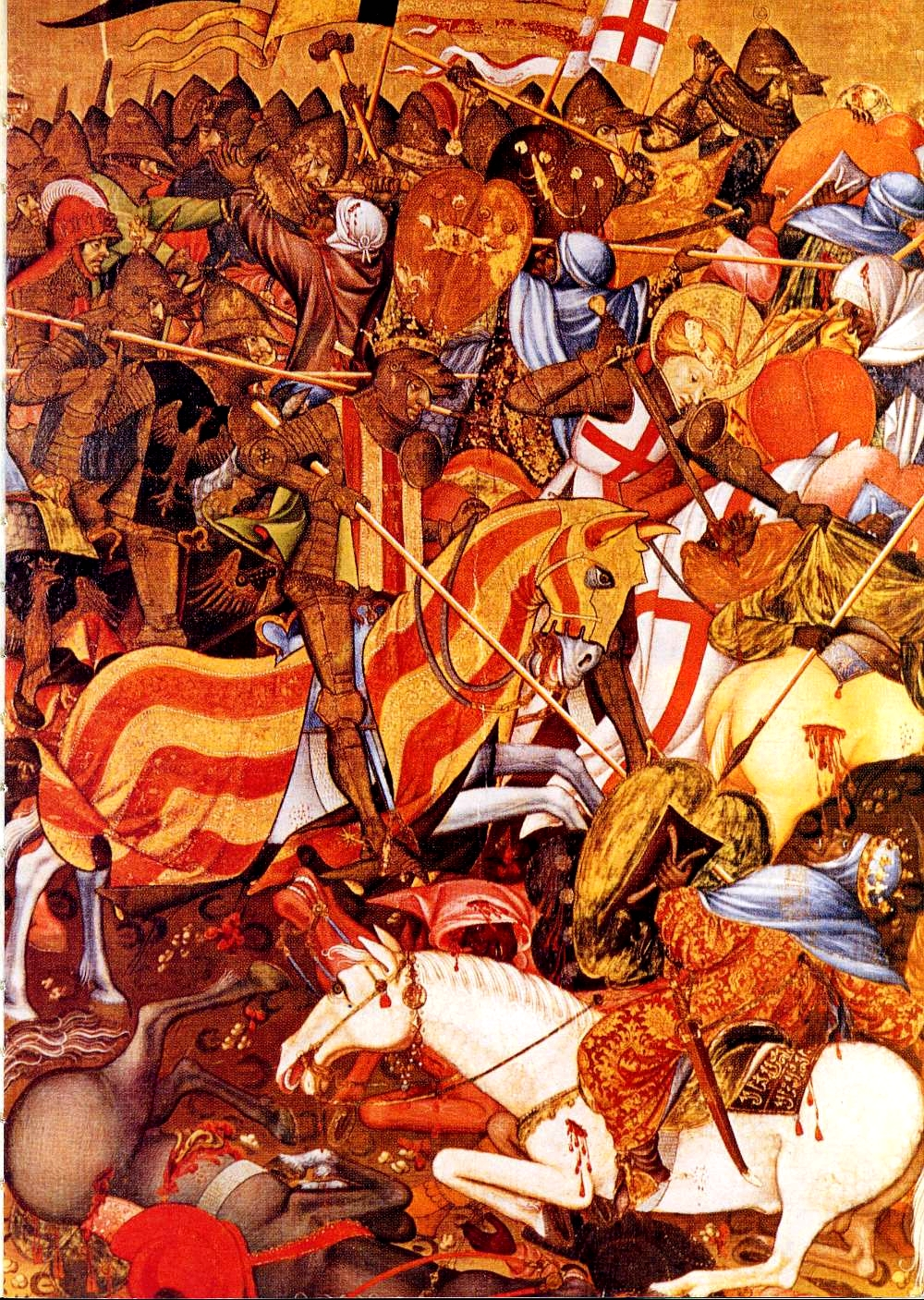
Battle of the Puig, one of the central panels of the Centenar de la Ploma (tempera on panel, ca. 1405), Andreu Marçal de Sax (ca. 1393-1410). It represents the Battle of El Puig de Santa Maria (1237) during the conquest of Valencia, with James I and Saint George. Victoria & Albert Museum, London

Alfonso II inherited two realms and with them, two different expansion processes. The House of Jiménez looked south in a battle against Castile for the control of the middle valley of the Ebro in the Iberian peninsula. The House of Barcelona looked north to its origins, Occitania, where through family ties it had significant influence, especially in Toulouse, Provence and Foix, towards the south along the Mediterranean coast and towards the Mediterranean sea.

Soon, Alfonso II of Aragon and I of Barcelona committed to conquering Valencia as the Aragonese nobility demanded. Like his father, he gave priority to the expansion and consolidation of the House of Barcelona's influence in Occitania.

Alfonso II signed the treaties of Cazorla, a multilateral treaty between Navarre, Aragon, León, Portugal, and Castile to redefine the frontiers and zones of expansion of each kingdom. Alfonso II assured Valencia by renouncing the Aragonese rights of annexing Murcia in exchange for securing the Aragonese frontier with Castile. This action should be seen as result of the aforementioned priority given over the Occitan and Catalan dominions of the Crown of Aragon.

From the ninth century, the dukes of Aquitaine, the kings of Navarre, the counts of Foix, the counts of Toulouse and the counts of Barcelona were rivals in their attempts at controlling the various counties of the Hispanic Marches and pays of Occitania. And the House of Barcelona succeeded in extending its influence to the area that is now south of France through strong family ties, in the areas of the County of Provence, County of Toulouse and County of Foix. The rebellion of the Cathars or Albigensians, who rejected the authority and teachings of the Catholic Church, led to the loss of these possessions in southern France. Pope Innocent III called upon Philip II of France to suppress the Albigensians—the Albigensian Crusade, which led to bringing Occitania firmly under the control of the King of France, and the Capetian dynasty from northern France.

Peter II of Aragon returned from the Battle of Las Navas de Tolosa in autumn 1212 to find that Simon de Montfort, 5th Earl of Leicester, had conquered Toulouse, exiling Count Raymond VI of Toulouse, who was Peter's brother-in-law and vassal. Peter's army crossed the Pyrenees and arrived at Muret where they were joined by Raymond of Foix and Raymond of Toulouse's forces, in September 1213 to confront Montfort's army. The Battle of Muret began on 12 September 1213. The Catalan, Aragonese and Occitan forces were disorganised and disintegrated under the assault of Montfort's squadrons. Peter himself was caught in the thick of fighting, and died as a result of a foolhardy act of bravado. Thus, the nobility of Toulouse, Foix and other vassals of the Crown of Aragon were defeated. The conflict concluded with the Treaty of Meaux-Paris in 1229, in which the Crown of Aragon agreed to renounce its rights over the south of Occitania with the integration of these territories into the dominions of the King of France.

King James I (13th century) returned to an era of expansion to the South, by conquering and incorporating Mallorca, Ibiza, and a good share of the Kingdom of Valencia into the Crown. With the Treaty of Corbeil (1258), which was based upon the principle of natural frontiers, the Capetians were recognised as heirs of the Carolingian dynasty, and the Capetian king Louis IX renounced any historical claim of feudal overlordship over Catalonia. The general principle was clear, Catalan influence north of the Pyrenees, beyond the Roussillon, Vallespir, Conflent and Capcir, was to cease. James I had realized that wasting his forces and distracting his energies in attempts to keep a footing in France would only end in disaster.

The Kingdom of Majorca, including the Balearic Islands, and the counties of Cerdanya and Roussillon-Vallespir and the city of Montpellier, was held independently from 1276 to 1279 by James II of Majorca and as a vassal of the Crown of Aragon after that date until 1349, becoming a full member of the Crown of Aragon from 1349.

Valencia was finally made a new kingdom with its own institutions and not an extension of the Kingdom of Aragon as the Aragonese noblemen had intended since even before the creation of the Crown of Aragon. The Kingdom of Valencia became the third member of the Crown together with Aragon and the Principality of Catalonia. The Kingdom of Majorca had an independent status with its own kings until 1349. In January 1266, James I besieged and captured Murcia, then settled his own men, mostly Catalans, there; and handed Murcia over to Castile with the treaty of Cazorla.

In 1282, the Sicilians rose up against the second dynasty of the Angevins on the Sicilian Vespers and massacred the garrison soldiers throughout the island. Peter III responded to their call, and landed in Trapani to an enthusiastic welcome five months later. This caused Pope Martin IV to excommunicate the king, place Sicily under interdiction, and offer the kingdom of Aragon to a son of Philip III of France.

When Peter III refused to impose the Charters of Aragon in Valencia, the nobles and towns united in Zaragoza to demand a confirmation of their privileges, which the king had to accept in 1283. Thus began the Union of Aragon, which developed the power of the Justícia to mediate between the king and the Aragonese bourgeois.

When James II of Aragon (Note: Not to be confused with James II of Majorca) completed the conquest of the Kingdom of Valencia, the Crown of Aragon established itself as one of the major powers in Europe.

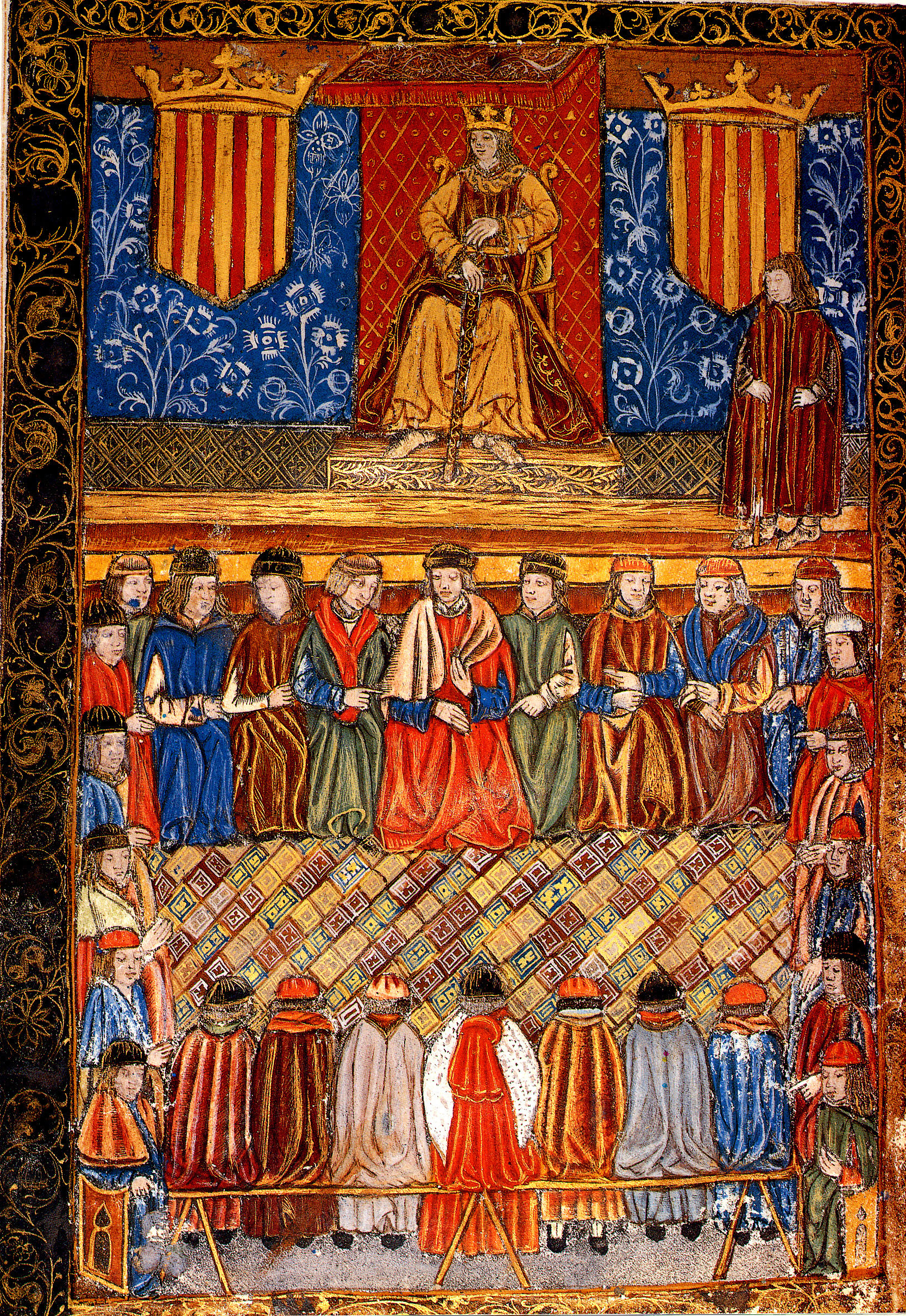
Ferdinand II of Aragon on his throne presiding over the General Court of Catalonia, flanked by two shields with the emblem of the Royal arms of Aragon. Frontispiece of a 1495 edition of Catalan constitutions.

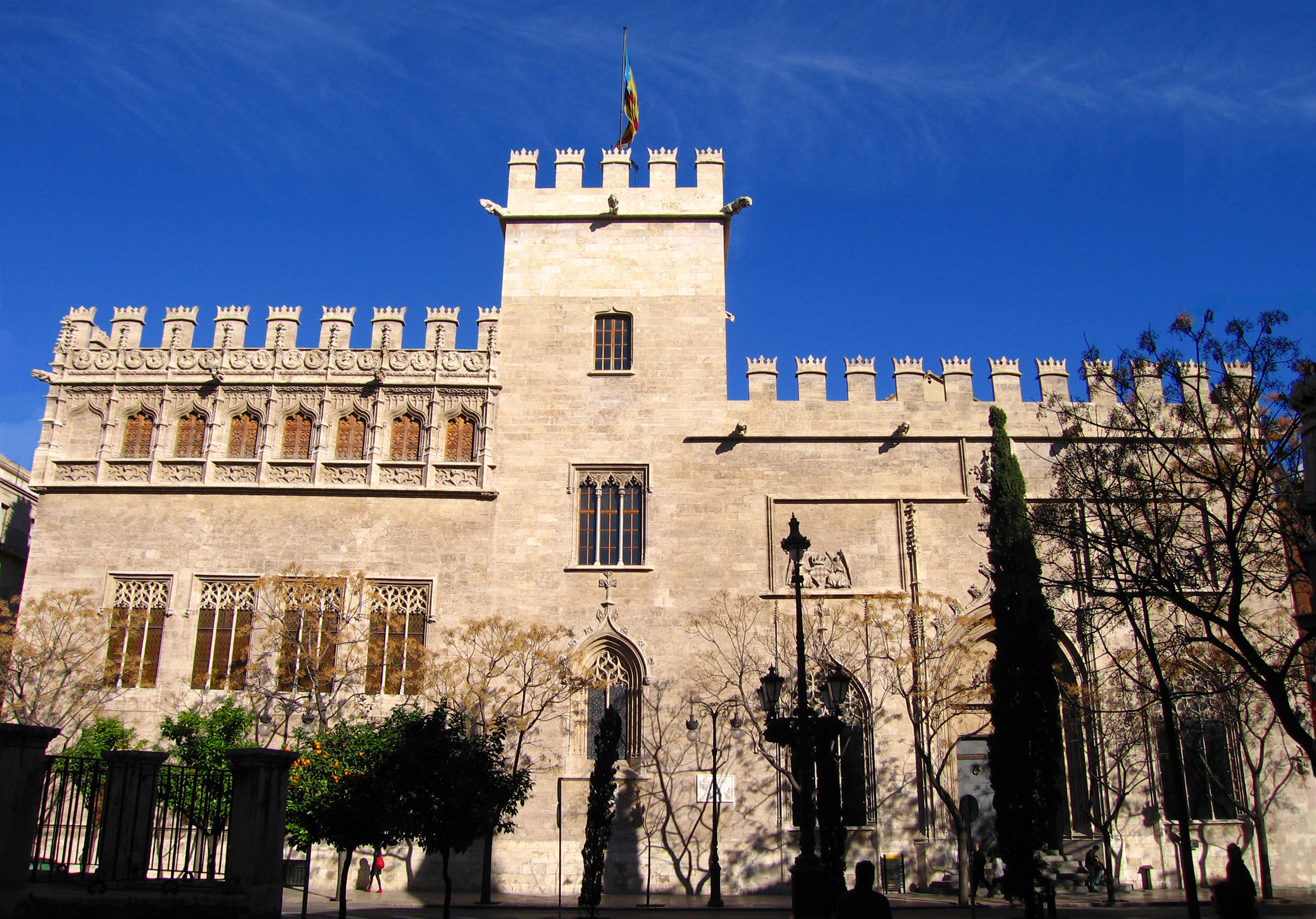
Llotja de la Seda (Silk Market) of Valencia, 15th century Gothic style

In 1297, to solve the dispute between the Anjevins and the Aragonese over Sicily, Pope Boniface VIII created ex novo a Kingdom of Sardinia and Corsica and entrusted it as a fief to the Aragonese King James II, ignoring already existing, indigenous states. In 1324, James II finally started to seize the Pisan territories in the former states of Cagliari and Gallura. In 1347 Aragon made war on the Genoese Doria and Malaspina houses, which controlled most of the lands of the former Logudoro state in north-western Sardinia, and added them to its direct domains. The Giudicato of Arborea, the only remaining independent Sardinian state, proved far more difficult to subdue. The rulers of Arborea developed the ambition to unite all of Sardinia under their rule and create a single Sardinian state, and at a certain point (1368–1388, 1392–1409) almost managed to drive the Aragonese out. The war between Arborea and Aragon was fought on and off for more than 100 years; this situation lasted until 1409, when the army of Arborea suffered a heavy defeat by the Aragonese army in the Battle of Sanluri; the capital Oristano was lost in 1410. After some years during which Arborean rulers failed to organise a successful resurgence, they sold their remaining rights for 100,000 gold florins, and by 1420 the Aragonese Kingdom of Sardinia finally extended throughout the island. The subduing of Sardinia having taken a century, Corsica, which had never been wrested from the Genoese, was dropped from the formal title of the Kingdom.

Through the marriage of Peter IV to Maria of Sicily (1381), the Kingdom of Sicily, as well as the duchies of Athens and Neopatria, were finally implemented more firmly into the Crown. The Greek possessions were permanently lost to Nerio I Acciaioli in 1388 and Sicily was dissociated in the hands of Martin I from 1395 to 1409, but the Kingdom of Naples was added finally in 1442 by the conquest led by Alfonso V.

The King's possessions outside of the Iberian Peninsula and Balearic Islands were ruled by proxy through local elites as petty kingdoms, rather than subjected directly to a centralised government. They were more an economic part of the Crown of Aragon than a political one.

The fact that the King was keen on settling new kingdoms instead of merely expanding the existing kingdoms was a part of a power struggle that pitted the interests of the king against those of the existing nobility. This process was also under way in most of the European states that successfully effected the transition to the Early Modern state. Thus, the new territories gained from the Moors—namely Valencia and Majorca—were given furs as an instrument of self-government in order to limit the power of nobility in these new acquisitions and, at the same time, increase their allegiance to the monarchy itself. The trend in the neighbouring kingdom of Castile was quite similar, both kingdoms giving impetus to the Reconquista by granting different grades of self-government either to cities or territories, instead of placing the new territories under the direct rule of nobility.

The literary evocation of past splendour recalls correctly the great age of the 13th and 14th centuries, when Majorca, Valencia and Sicily were conquered, the population growth could be handled without social conflict, and the urban prosperity, which peaked in 1345, created the institutional and cultural achievements of the Crown.

=== Personal union with Castile ===
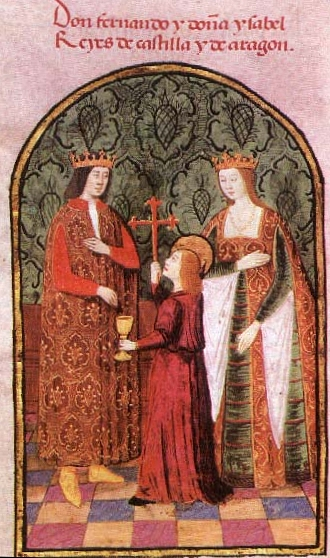
Ferdinand V and Isabella I, King and Queen of Castile and León, and later of Aragon, Majorca, Valencia, and Sicily, and Count and Countess of Barcelona

In 1410, King Martin I, the last reigning member of the House of Barcelona, died without living descendants or heirs. As a result, on the Compromise of Caspe (1412), representatives from each Iberian state of the Crown, the kingdoms of Aragon, Valencia and the Principality of Catalonia, chose Ferdinand of Antequera from the Castilian dynasty of Trastámara as king of the Crown of Aragon as Ferdinand I of Aragon.

The opposition of the institutions of Catalonia to the policies of the son of Ferdinand, John II resulted led to the ten-year Catalan Civil War (1462–1472) that left the country exhausted, its influence within the Crown and at international level weakened and its institutions in debt. Later, his son King Ferdinand II of Aragon recovered the northern Catalan counties—Roussillon and Cerdagne—which had been lost to France during the conflict, as well as the Kingdom of Navarre, which had recently joined the Crown of Aragon but had been lost after internal dynastic disputes.

In 1469, Ferdinand married Infanta Isabella of Castile, half-sister of King Henry IV of Castile, who became Queen of Castile and León after Henry's death in 1474. Their marriage was a dynastic union which became the constituent event for the dawn of the Monarchy of Spain. At that point both the Castile and the states of the Crown of Aragon remained distinct polities, each keeping its own traditional institutions, parliaments and laws. The process of territorial consolidation was completed when their grandson King Charles I, known as Emperor Charles V, in 1516 ruled over all of the kingdoms on the Iberian peninsula, save the Kingdoms of Portugal and the Algarve, under one monarch—his co-monarch and mother Queen Joanna I in confinement—thereby furthering the creation of the Spanish monarchy, albeit a composite and decentralized one.

=== Dissolution ===
Philip II's European and North African dominions in 1581

The Aragonese crown's wealth and power stagnated and its authority was steadily transferred to the new Spanish crown settled in Castile after that date—the demographic growth was partially offset by the expulsion of the Jews from Spain (1492), Muslims (1502) and the expulsion of the Moriscos (1609).

Conflicts occurred throughout the early modern period. In 1521, the Germanies (Brotherhoods), a movement that originated in the Kingdom of Valencia, began, lasting until 1523. A similar movement, led by Joanot Colom, took place in the Kingdom of Mallorca. The final defeat of the agermanats (the participants) led to severe repression and the reassertion of royal authority. Later, during the reign of Philip I (II of Castile), subjects of the Crown of Aragon were prohibited from studying abroad, due to the perceived risk of exposure to Calvinism (1568). Despite Catalan opposition, the Crown was unable to prevent the separation of Sicily and Naples due to the establishment of the Council of Italy.

Tensions between Catalan institutions and the gradually more centralized monarchy began to arise. In 1626 the Count-Duke of Olivares, minister of Philip III (IV of Castile), tried to establish the mandatory military contribution of the states of the monarchy, the Union of Arms, but the opposition of the Principality of Catalonia was strong. This events, alongside other factors such as the economic crisis, the continuous presence of royal soldiers and the peasants' revolts led to the Reapers' War (1640–1652) in which Catalonia, led by the president of the Generalitat, Pau Claris, briefly established itself as an independent republic under French protection between 1640 and 1641, and later appointed King Louis XIII of France as count of Barcelona until 1652. The Treaty of the Pyrenees (1659) between Spain and France meant loss of Roussillon in 1659.

The Crown of Aragon and the institutions and public law of its states were abolished between 1707 and 1716 after the pro-Habsurg faction (known as Austracista) defeat at the War of the Spanish Succession (1701–1714) by the Nueva Planta decrees, issued by the Bourbon Philip V of Spain. The original political structure was swept away, the administration was subsumed into the Castilian laws (despite Aragon, Catalonia and Majorca retaining their private laws), the states of the Crown of Aragon loss their status of independent political entities and were united formally with those of Castile to legally form a single state, the Kingdom of Spain, as it moved towards an absolutist centralized government under the new Bourbon dynasty. The loss of Minorca to the Britsh, and the imposition of French language on Roussillon (1700) and Castilian as the language of government in all the old Aragonese Crown lands in Spain (1707–1716).

== Modern interpretations and revisionism ==
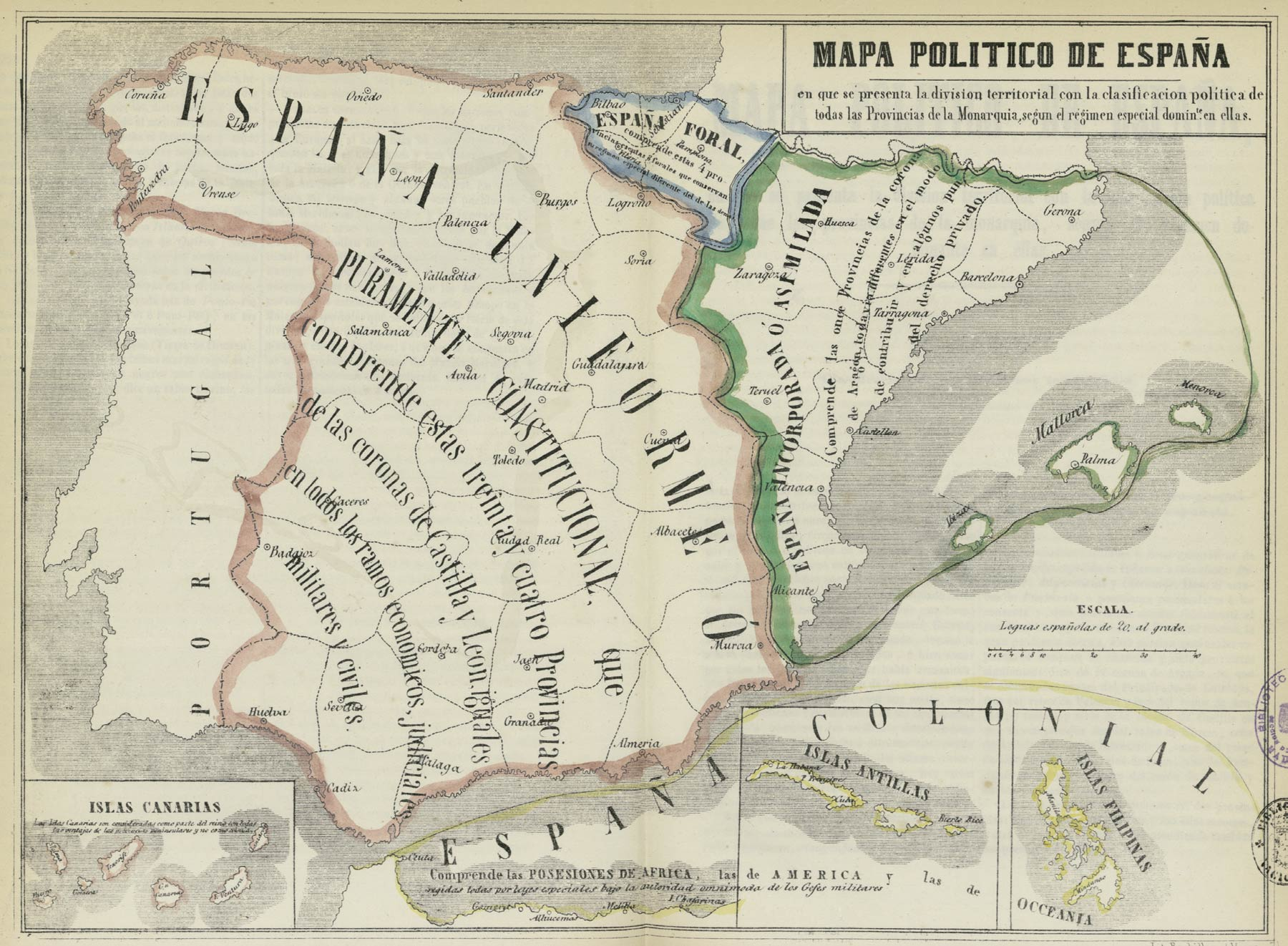
Political map of Spain (1850), divided into four parts: the Fully constitutional Spain (brown), most of the former Crown of Castile; Incorporated or assimilated Spain (green), the former Crown of Aragon; Foral Spain (blue), the Basque-speaking territories; and Colonial Spain (yellow)

Some of the nationalist movements in Spain consider the former kingdoms of the Crown of Aragon to be the foundation of their nations, the Catalan nationalist movement being the most prominent. Spanish nationalism, on the other hand, tends to place more importance on the later dynastic union with the Crown of Castile, considering it the origin of one Spanish nation.

The Romanticism of the 19th century Catalan Renaixença movement evoked a "Pyrenean realm" that corresponded more to the vision of 13th century troubadours than to the historical reality of the Crown. This vision survived as "a nostalgic programme of politicised culture". Thus, the history of the Crown of Aragon remains a politically loaded topic in modern Spain, especially when it comes to asserting the level of independence enjoyed by constituents of the Crown, the Principality of Catalonia and the kingdoms of Aragon, Valencia and Majorca, which is sometimes used to justify the level of autonomy (or independence) that should be enjoyed by the contemporary corresponding autonomous communities via historical rights, as Navarre and the Basque territories currently enjoy.

In recent times, the confusion between the concepts of Crown of Aragon and one of its components, the Kingdom of Aragon, became particularly widespread (usually coming from Spanish nationalism), thus denying the composite structure of the first one. The direct consequence of this revisionist statement is the denial or relativisation of the existence of the Principality of Catalonia (despite the term "Principality" or the historical existence of a Catalan polity not being an issue at academic level), under the assumption that the term was just a geographic expression void of any political significance, and claiming that the Catalan counties were an integral part of the Kingdom of Aragon.

== Composition ==
The crown was made up of the following realms and lands (which are nowadays parts of the modern countries of Spain, France, Italy, Greece, Malta, and Andorra).

Sort by "Earliest annexion" to see the states in the chronological order they were joined to the crown.

Name	Type of entity	Notes	Earliest annexion
Andorra	Co-lordship	Formed by a charter (Pareatge) in 1278 as a co-lordship within the Principality of Catalonia, with the bishop of Urgell and the count of Foix as co-lords. Bonds between Andorra and the Crown weakened during the 17th century, resulting in the definitive separation from Catalonia in 1715. Briefly confiscated by the King of Aragon in 1396 and again in 1512.	1278
Aragon	Kingdom	Joined with the County of Barcelona in 1137 to form the Crown. Initially a personal union of the counties of Aragon (kingdom after 1035), Sobrarbe and Ribagorza, it was gradually unified under the Fueros of Aragon between 1247 and 1283.	1137
Athens	Duchy	Conquered by the Catalan Company in 1311; Inherited through the Kingdom of Sicily in 1381; lost in 1388. Lordship of Salona remained under the Fadrique branch of the House of Barcelona until 1394.	1311/81
Catalonia, originally Barcelona	Principality, originally a county	Joined with Aragon in 1137 to form the Crown. From 1173 onwards, the County of Barcelona developed common legislation and institutions with the other Catalan counties, such as the Usages (1251) and Constitutions (1283), the General Court (1214) and the Generalitat (1359), establishing the Principality of Catalonia as a state.	1137/73
Gévaudan	County	Inherited in 1166 by Alfonso II; lost in 1307.	1166
Majorca	Kingdom	Established in 1231 by James I, including the Catalan counties of Roussillon, Cerdanya and the Lordship of Montpellier, as part of the Crown.	1231
Montpellier	Lordship	Inhereted in 1213 by James I from his mother, Maria of Montpellier. It became part of the Crown of Majorca in 1276 and, in 1344 James III sold the Lordship to Philip VI of France.	1213
Naples	Kingdom	Successfully wrested by Alfonso V from Capetian rule in 1442; briefly gained independence ; in 1494, contended again by the French King Charles VIII, then reconquered by Spain in the Italian War of 1499–1504; lost permanently in 1714, after the War of the Spanish Succession.	1442
Navarre	Kingdom	John II of Aragon became co-ruler of Navarre jure uxoris in 1425 and became sole ruler in 1441. After he and his daughter Eleanor died in 1479, Aragon lost control again.	1425
Neopatria	Duchy	Conquered by the Catalan Company in 1319; Inherited through the Kingdom of Sicily in 1381; lost in 1390.	1319/81
Provence	County	Inherited with the county of Barcelona in 1137; ruled by the House of Barcelona until the death of Beatrice in 1267.	1137
Sardinia and Corsica	Kingdom	In 1297 Pope Boniface VIII created ex novo this kingdom (Note: Formally including Corsica, which was never conquered or controlled by the Aragonese or the Spanish.) and entrusted it in fiefdom to the Aragonese King James II, ignoring the already existing, indigenous states. Corsica was never conquered durably. The kingdom was lost in 1714.	1324
Sicily	Kingdom	Inherited through Constance II of Sicily, lost in 1713, (Note: Including Malta. In 1530 Emperor Charles V gave the islands to the Knights Hospitaller under the leadership of Philippe de Villiers de L'Isle-Adam, Grand Master of the Order, in perpetual lease for which they had to pay the Tribute of the Maltese Falcon. These knights, a military religious order now known as the Knights of Malta, had been driven out of Rhodes by the Ottoman Empire in 1522.) also known as Kingdom of Trinacria.	1282
Valencia	Kingdom	Established in 1238 as part of the Crown, following the conquest of the Moorish taifa.	1238

== Pennon ==
"Heraldic Apotheosis", 1681 painting of the heraldry of the lands that were part of the Crown of Aragon at some point. The eleven coats of arms surronding the center are, alternating from left and right and going down: Principality of Catalonia ("PRIN[CIPATVS] GHOTOLON[IAE]"), Kingdom of Aragon ("REGNV[M] ARAGON[IS]"), Kingdom of Valencia ("REGNV[M] VALE[N]TIAE"), Kingdom of Navarre ("REGNV[M] NAVARRAE"), Kingdom of Mallorca and the Island of Menorca ("REG[NVM] MAIOR[ICAR]V[M] ET [INSVLA] MINOR[ICAR]V[M]"), Kingdom of Sardinia ("REGNVM SARDINIAE"), Islands of Eivissa ("INSVLAE IVISSAE"), Kingdom of Jerusalem ("REG[NVM] HIERVSALEM"), Kingdom of Naples ("REG[NVM] NEAPOLIS"), Kingdom of Sicily ("REG[NVM] SICILIAE"), and City of Barcelona ("BARCIN[ON]E CIVITAS [...]"). The inscription on the lower edge of the fabric reads: "Bank of the causes of the Royal Court and Consulate of you, magnificent Catalan nation and Royal Crown of Aragon, of Naples. Year 1681"

The origin of coat of arms of the Crown of Aragon is the familiar coat of the Counts of Barcelona and Kings of Aragon. The Pennon was used exclusively by the monarchs of the Crown and was expressive of their sovereignty. It appeared for the first time in a seal of Ramon Berenguer IV, dating from 1150. James III of Majorca, vassal of the Crown of Aragon, used a coat of arms with four bars, as seen on the Leges palatinae miniatures.

=== Coat of arms of the kings of the Crown of Aragon ===
Coat of arms from Ramon Berenguer IV of Barcelona to Alfonso II of Aragon

Coat of arms from Alfonso II of Aragon to Peter II of Aragon

Coat of arms from Peter II of Aragon to Peter IV of Aragon

Coat of arms from Peter IV of Aragon to Ferdinand II of Aragon

Coat of arms with the Crest of the Chivalry of Saint George from the Inventory of King Martin

Coat of arms with the Golden Fleece, 16th-19th centuries

== Institutions ==
The Royal Chancellery (in Catalan: Cancelleria Reial, in Aragonese: Cancelleria Reyal) was a key institution of the royal administration, dating back to the 13th century. It was responsible for documenting and recording the political, governmental, and administrative acts issued by the king and its court. It was headed by the chancellor, who oversaw the bureaucratic, administrative, and judicial organization of the monarchy; the chancellor also presided over the royal court (Audiència regia), held the royal seal, and countersigned specific acts and documents. In 1388, during the reign of John I, the Chancellery was reorganized to include three vice-chancelleries: one for the Principality of Catalonia (who also oversaw the kingdoms of Majorca and Sardinia); another for the Kingdom of Aragon; and a third for the Kingdom of Valencia. Each was associated with an Audience (high court) presided over by the respective vice-chancellor.

As separate states united to the Crown under the aeque principaliter principle, Aragon, Catalonia and Valencia each had a legislative body, known as the Cortes in the Kingdom of Aragon (the Courts of Aragon) or Corts in the Principality of Catalonia (the Catalan Courts) and the Kingdom of Valencia (the Valencian Courts). These assemblies had numerous powers, most notably the authority to recognize the king, approve general legislation, and establish taxation. They were composed of representatives of the three estates (Catalan: braços), namely the military estate, the ecclesiastical estate, and the royal estate (cities and towns). During sessions of the Corts, the amount of subsidies to be raised on behalf of the monarchy was negotiated between the king and the representatives. Furthermore, the assembly may issue formal remonstrances to the king regarding any failure to respect the general legislation corresponding to each state, known as Fueros of Aragon, Constitutions of Catalonia, Furs of Valencia and Franqueses of Majorca.

A Diputación del General or Diputació del General was established in each, becoming known as a Generalidad in Aragon and Generalitat in Catalonia and Valencia.

From the 15th century onwards, every realm of the Crown was granted its own court of justice in the form of Royal Audience, resulting from the division of the Royal Court and the establishment of the Council of Aragon in its place. After the dynastic union with Castile and the establishment of the monarchs in that realm, the king began to be permanently represented in the realms of the Crown of Aragon by viceroys, one for each state, including Mallorca and Sardinia.

== Capital ==
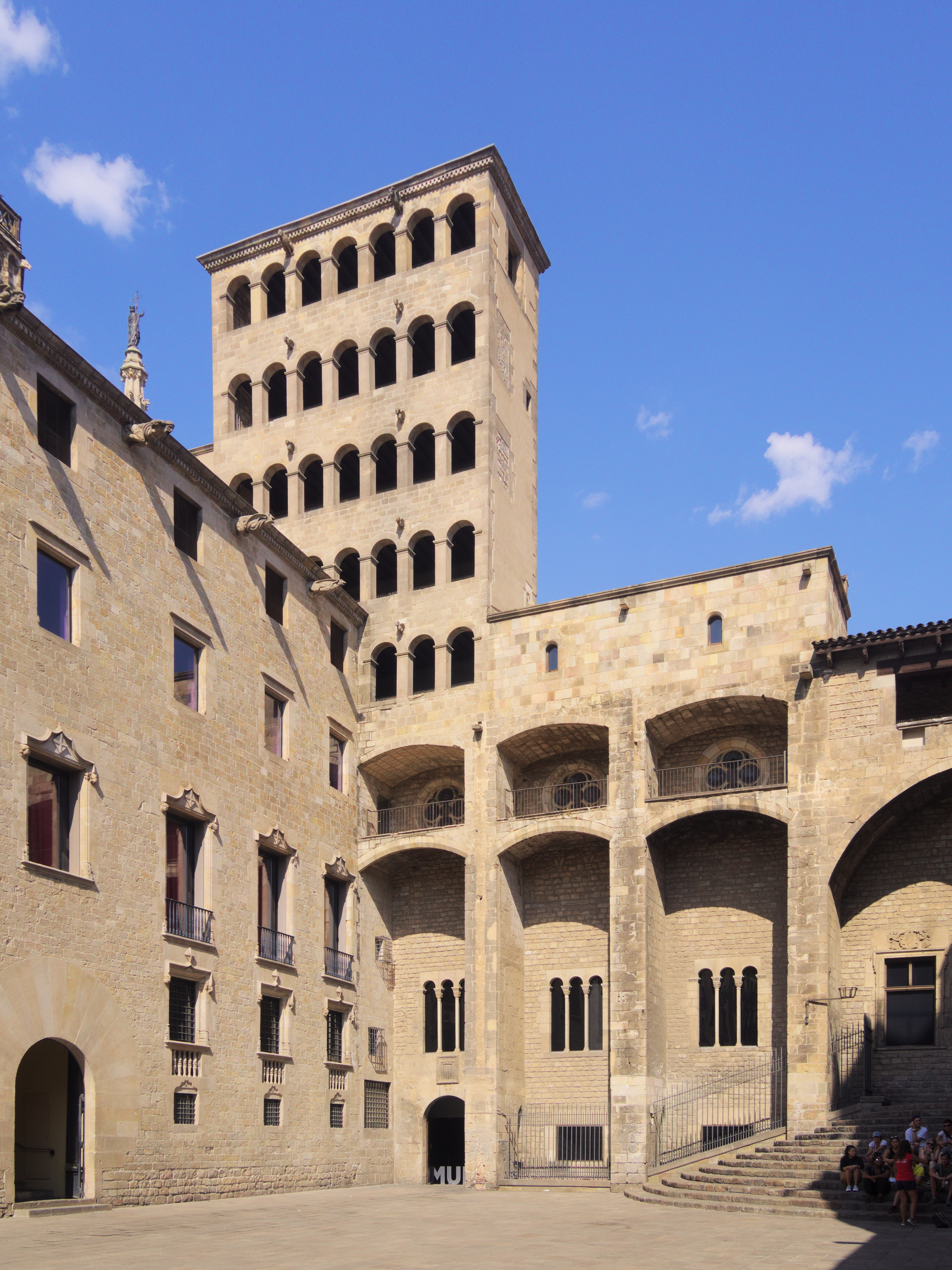
Left: Palau Reial Major of Barcelona, monarchs' most frequent residence and administrative center of the Crown until the mid 15th century. Right: Cathedral of the Savior of Zaragoza, seat of coronation of the kings

The house of the Crown was the Cathedral of the Savior of Zaragoza from Peter II (late 12th century). The General Courts of the Crown (the simultaneous meeting of the Courts of Catalonia, Aragon and Valencia) used to gather at Monzón (13th to 16th centuries), the remaining meetings took place at Fraga, Zaragoza, Calatayud and Tarazona. The de facto capital, however, was Barcelona, being the most frequent royal residence (mostly residing in the Palau Reial Major) as well as the chancellor headquarters from 13th to 16th centuries, temporary moved to Naples during the reign of Alfonso V.

On the other hand, the General Archive of the Crown of Aragon (originally known as the Royal Archive of Barcelona), which was the official repository of royal documentation of the Crown since the reign of James II (14th century), has its seat in Barcelona, being founded in 1318, after the unification of the documentary deposits of the Kingdom of Aragon, located in the Monastery of Santa María de Sigena, and that of the County of Barcelona, located in the house of the Knights Hospitaller of the city. By decision of Peter IV (1340), the Abbey of Santa Maria de Poblet, in southern Catalonia, became the royal pantheon.

In the early 15th century, the de facto capital was the city of Valencia until Alfonso V came to the throne. During the 15th and the 16th centuries, the Crown's de facto capital was Naples. After Alfonso V of Aragon, Ferdinand II of Aragon settled the capital in Naples. Alfonso, in particular, wanted to transform Naples into a real Mediterranean capital and lavished huge sums to embellish it further. Later the courts were itinerant until Philip II of Spain. The Spanish historian Domingo Buesa Conde has argued that Zaragoza ought to be considered the permanent political capital, but not the economic or administrative capital, owing to the obligation for kings to be crowned at the Cathedral of the Savior of Zaragoza. (Note: Domingo J. Buesa Conde postulates that the Crown of Aragon's political capital of Zaragoza though it was not the economic or the administrative one since the court was itinerative in the 14th century and took its start from the decrees of Peter IV of Aragon establishing his coronation there: "Pedro IV parte (...) de la aceptación de la capital del Ebro como 'cabeza del Reino'. [...] por eso hizo saber a sus súbditos que 'Mandamos que este sacrosanto sacramento de la unción sea recibido de manos del metropolitano en la ciudad de Zaragoza' al tiempo que recordaba: "... y como quiera que los reyes de Aragón están obligados a recibir la unción en la ciudad de Zaragoza, que es la cabeza del Reino de Aragón, el cual reino es nuestra principal designación—esto es, apellido—y título, consideramos conveniente y razonable que, del mismo modo, en ella reciban los reyes de Aragón el honor de la coronación y las demás insignias reales, igual que vimos a los emperadores recibir la corona en la ciudad de Roma, cabeza de su imperio. Zaragoza, antigua capital del reino de Aragón, se ha convertido en la capital política de la Corona (...)".)

== Culture ==
During the Crown of Aragon, the Catalan culture and language underwent a vigorous expansion. During the period of trade, Occitan-Catalan contributions to Maltese occurred.

King Fernando II and Queen Isabella, as the Catholic Monarchs who began the Inquisition, were contrary to the more plural development that preceded in the Crown of Aragon. The previous religious background was described as "longstanding tradition of Mudejarism, the royal sanctioning and protection of subject Muslim populations within Christian realms." Aesthetic Mudéjar architecture of Aragon has been observed as demonstrating the influence of Andalusian and Arab culture in Aragon proper. Gothic architecture was also developed.

Map of Europe and the Mediterranean from the Catalan Atlas of 1375

The Mediterranean Lingua Franca was a mixed language used widely for commerce and diplomacy and was also current among slaves of the bagnio, Barbary pirates and European renegades in precolonial Algiers. Among the speakers who created the language, also called Sabir, were Muslims from Aragon called "Tagarins" (a term mentioned by Miguel Cervantes). Historically, the first to use it were the Genoese and Venetian trading colonies in the eastern Mediterranean after the year 1000.

As the use of Lingua Franca spread in the Mediterranean, dialectal fragmentation emerged, the main difference being more use of Italian and Provençal vocabulary in the Middle East, while Ibero-Romance lexical material dominated in the Maghreb. After France became the dominant power in the latter area in the 19th century, Algerian Lingua Franca was heavily gallicised (to the extent that locals are reported having believed that they spoke French when conversing in Lingua Franca with the Frenchmen, who in turn thought they were speaking Arabic), and this version of the language was spoken into the nineteen hundreds...

The similarities contribute to discussions of the classification of the Mediterranean Lingua Franca as a language. Although its official classification is that of a pidgin, some scholars adamantly oppose that classification and believe it would be better viewed as an interlanguage of Italian.

Linguist Steven Dworkin hypothesized that Catalan was the point of entry for Mediterranean Lingua Franca terms into Spain, arguably the source of several Italian and Arabic loanwords in Spanish, citing the DCECH.

== See also ==
- Cortes of Tarazona (1592)
- List of Aragonese monarchs
- List of Sicilian monarchs
- Prince of Girona
- Great Catalan Company
