= Civil Code of Catalonia =

Civil Code of Catalonia Codi Civil de Catalunya

Parliament of Catalonia
- Citation: Civil Code
- Territorial extent: Catalonia
- Passed by: Parliament of Catalonia
- Passed: 30 December 2002 (first book); 15 February 2017 (sixth book)
- Signed by: President of the Generalitat Jordi Pujol (first book); President of the Generalitat Carles Puigdemont (sixth book)
- Introduced by: Ministry of Justice of Catalonia

Repeals
- Compilation of the Special Civil Law of Catalonia of 1960
- Status: In force

The Civil Code of Catalonia (in Catalan: Codi Civil de Catalunya) is the main codified law of civil law in force in Catalonia, adopted in 2002 and organized into six books. In Catalonia, the Spanish Civil Code only applies to the extent that it does not conflict with the provisions of the civil law of Catalonia or its general principles.

== History ==
The civil law of the Principality of Catalonia, created over time during the Middle Ages and early modern period, survived the suppression of Catalan institutions and laws that took place after the defeat in the War of the Spanish Succession in 1716. The Decrees of Nueva Planta, promulgated by the King of Spain, Philip V, respected this law while simultaneously abolishing the institutions and the other rights of the Principality. However, as the Catalan Courts (the parliament) were abolished, the law remained without modifications for the next two centuries.

During the 19th and 20th centuries, and despite the enactment of a new Spanish Civil Code, Catalan nationalists successfully protected their separate civil law, though it was not until 1960 that the laws began to be compiled. The "Compilation of the Special Civil Law of Catalonia" (Spanish: Compilación de derecho civil especial de Cataluña) was approved in 1960 and, when Catalan self-government was restored in 1979, the Parliament of Catalonia ended the first phase of compilation; it approved law 13/1984, which adapted the compilation to democratic post-Franco Spain, as well as adapting several new special laws.

During the last years of the 20th century, the Parliament began the process of codification of the civil law. In this spirit, in 2002 it approved the "First Book of the Civil Code of Catalonia." The other books were approved over the course of the following decade. The Sixth Book was approved in 15 February 2017, ending the main task of codification of Catalan civil law.

== Contents ==
The First Law of the Civil Code establishes that it must be developed in the form of open code through the approval of various laws. As for 2024, the Civil Code of Catalonia is divided into six books:

- First book - General provisions and Prescription and expiration.
- Second book - Person and family.
- Third book - Legal person.
- Fourth book - Successions.
- Fifth book - Real rights.
- Sixth book - Obligations and contracts.

According to the author Esther Arroyo, the Catalan Civil Code was influenced by certain provisions of the Civil Code of Quebec, particularly in matters of property law.

== See also ==
- Constitutions of Catalonia
- Basque and Pyrenean fueros
