= Constitutions of Catalonia =

Laws of the Principality of Catalonia

Constitutions of Catalonia Constitucions de Catalunya
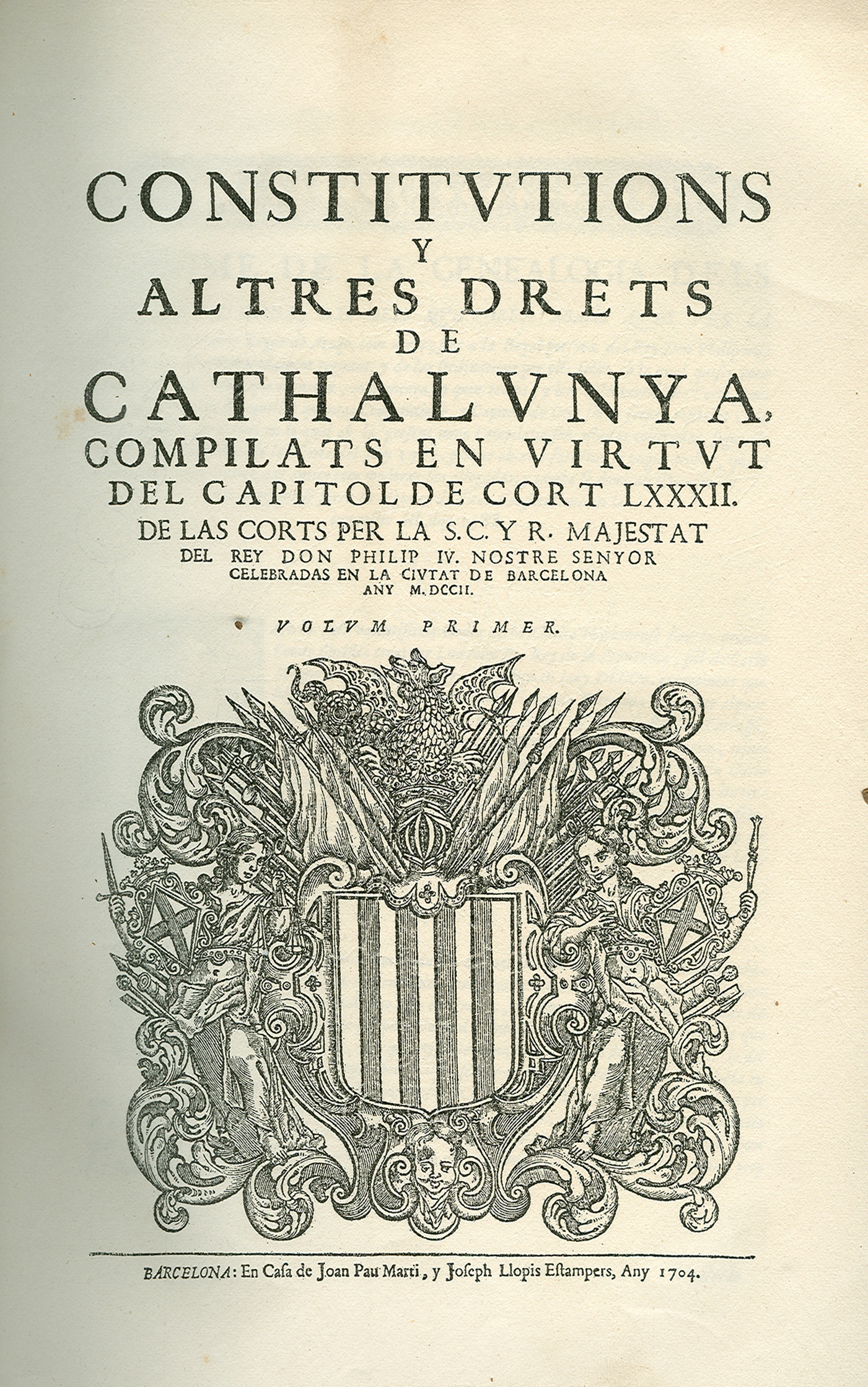
- Compilation of 1704

General Court of Catalonia
- Territorial extent: Principality of Catalonia
- Enacted by: General Court of Catalonia
- Enacted: 1283 (first); 1706 (last)
- Effective: 1283-1716
- Introduced by: Count of Barcelona

Repealed by
- Public law: Nueva Planta decree (1716); Criminal law: Spanish Criminal Code (1822); Mercantile law: Spanish Trade Code (1829)

Related legislation
- Usages of Barcelona

The Constitutions of Catalonia (Catalan: Constitucions de Catalunya) or Catalan constitutions (Catalan: Constitucions catalanes, IPA: [kunstitusiˈons kətəˈlanəs]) were the laws of the Principality of Catalonia introduced and promulgated by the Count of Barcelona (which was also the king of Aragon since 1137) and passed by the General Court of Catalonia (the parliament). Being the continuation of the legal framework of the Usages of Barcelona, the first constitutions passed by the Courts were promulgated in 1283. The last ones were promulgated by the Corts of 1705-1706. They had pre-eminence over the other legal rules, including royal decrees, and could only be revoked by the General Court itself. The compilations of the constitutions and other rights of Catalonia followed the Roman tradition of the Codex.

Despite never being formally repealed, the constitutions referring to public law were de facto suspended by the Nueva Planta Decree of 1716, an absolutist imposition of Philip V of Spain, while it left intact those referring to private, mercantile and criminal law. the last two were suspended throughout the 19th century, however, the private law survived and was codified and modernized via the current Civil Code of Catalonia. The recent efforts to reestablish and update part of the public law within the framework of the Statute of Autonomy of Catalonia, as Navarre and the Basque provinces enjoy, has been unsuccessful due to the opposition of the Spanish judiciary.

== History ==
=== Origins ===
The precedents and origins of the Catalan constitutions can be traced back to the 11th century; as part of efforts to forward and somehow control the process of feudalization, the count of Barcelona Ramon Berenguer I began the codification of the law in the Usages of Barcelona, the first full compilation of feudal law in Western Europe. The first constitutions passed in a regulated manner by Courts were promulgated by the General Court of Catalonia held in Barcelona in 1283, presided over by Peter III of Aragon. The king himself stated: "We want, we statue and we order: if we and our successors want to make any general constitution or statute in Catalonia, we will submit them to the approval and consent of the prelates, of the barons, of the knights and of the citizens or, from those apellates, of the largest and healthiest part of those".

The first compilation was prescribed by Ferdinand I of Aragon, by suggestion of the Courts held in Barcelona from 1413. It spread in the edition of 1495, together with the Usages of Barcelona:

- Usatges de Barcelona, Constitutions, Capitols, y Actes de Cort, y altras leys de Cathalunya ("Usages of Barcelona, constitutions, chapters and acts of court and other laws of Catalonia")

The compilations agreed in the general courts of 1585 and of 1701-1702 were published in three volumes:

- Constitutions y altres drets de Cathalunya ("Constitutions and other rights of Catalonia")
- Pragmaticas y altres drets de Cathalunya ("Pragmatics and other rights of Catalonia")
- Constitutions y altres drets de Cathalunya superfluos, contraris y corregits ("Constitutions and other rights of Catalonia, superfluous, contrary, and corrected")

The last constitutions were promulgated by the courts of 1701-1702 and 1705–1706 during the disputed reigns of, respectively, Philip V (1701-1705) and Charles III (1705-1714), the Bourbon and Habsburg pretenders to the Spanish throne during the War of the Spanish Succession (1701–1714). Those set of new constitutions represented an improvement in the guarantee of individual, civil and political rights (among them, the secrecy of correspondence), as well as the establishment of the Court of Contraventions (Catalan: Tribunal de Contrafaccions), in order to ensure the application of the constitutions and solve and prosecute any act (included the ones done by the king or his officers) contrary to the Catalan legislation.

=== De facto abolition: the Nueva Planta Decree ===
Shortly after the end of the War of the Spanish Succession, the king Philip V of Spain from the House of Bourbon issued the set of decrees known as the Nueva Planta decrees (Spanish: Decretos de Nueva Planta, Catalan: Decrets de Nova Planta). This series of decrees suppressed the separate laws and institutions of the territories that supported his Habsburg rival to the throne, the Archduke Charles of Austria; this included all realms of the Crown of Aragon. Therefore, the Decretos politically annexed the states of the Crown of Aragon to the Crown of Castile, attempting to make Spain into a centralized and absolutist monarchy on the model of France, applying most of the laws of Castile to all of Spain.

These acts were promulgated in Valencia and Aragon in 1707, and were extended in 1716 to the Principality of Catalonia and the Kingdom of Mallorca (with the exception of Menorca, a British possession at the time). Thus, those Catalan Constitutions of public and administrative laws were effectively suspended by the King's authority after his military victory, rather than through any legislative process within Catalonia itself.

The change ignored the constitution's own provisions for how they were to be amended or reformed. As contractual legislation they could not be repealed unilaterally, therefore, the Decree left them without effect rather than abolishing them.

=== Restoration attempts ===
In July 1810, during the Peninsular War, general Enrique O’Donnell, captain general of Catalonia, at the suggestion of the Superior Junta of the Principality of Catalonia (a body opposed to the French government) convened a congress in Tarragona. The members of the Congress, which emulated the original Catalan Courts, and the Junta of the Principality, presided over by the captain general, swore to respect and defend the Constitutions and rights of Catalonia.

During the Third Carlist War (1872–1876), Carlist forces managed to occupy some cities in the Catalan countryside. Isabel II was in exile and Amadeo I had reigned since 1871. The Carlist pretender Charles VII, grandson of the also pretender Carlos María Isidro, promised the Catalans, Valencians and Aragonese the return of their charters or fueros (Catalan: furs) and the constitutions that Philip V had previously suspended. The promise was never fulfilled, as the Carlist revolt did not succeed.

== Gallery of compilations ==
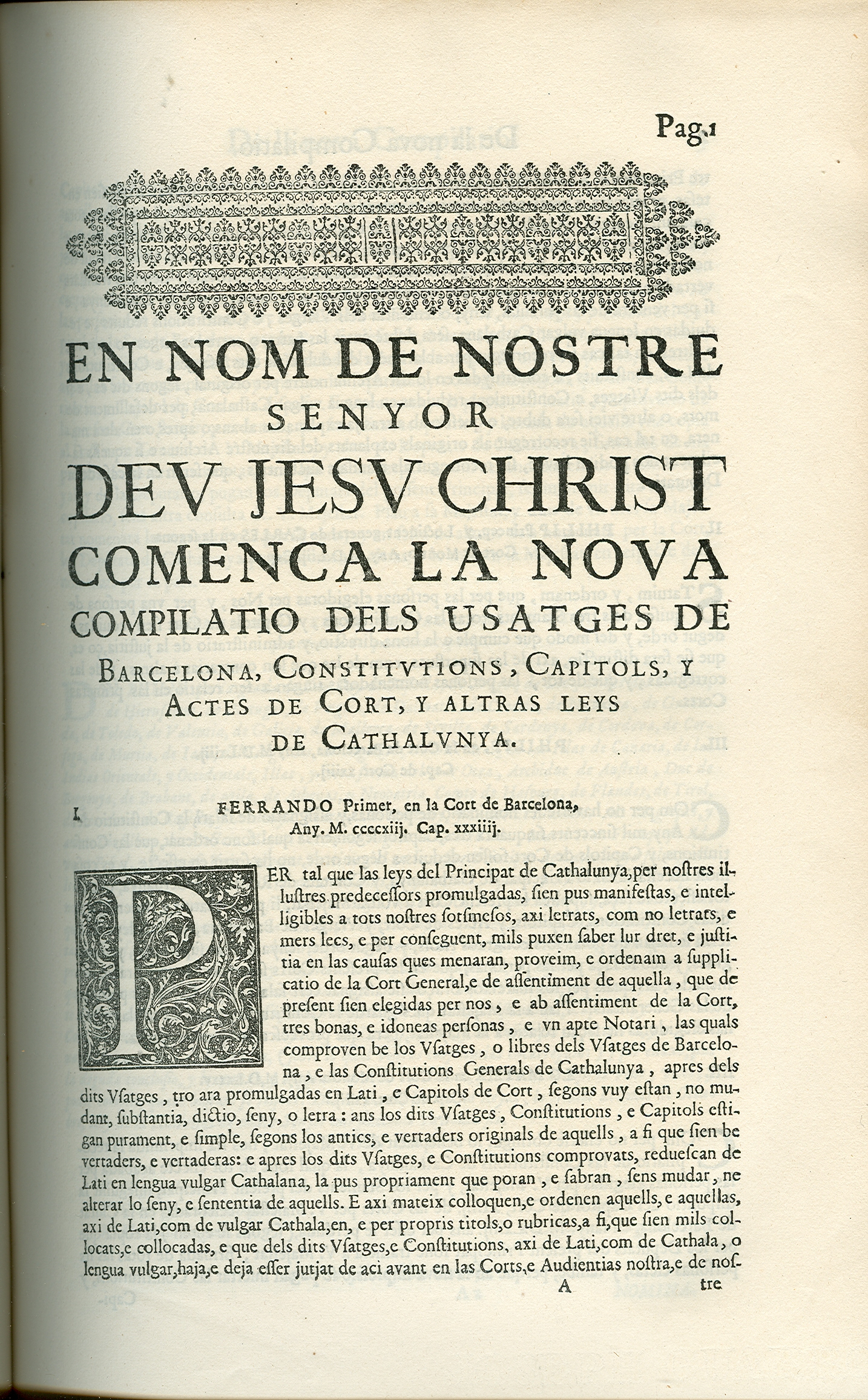
Compilation of 1413

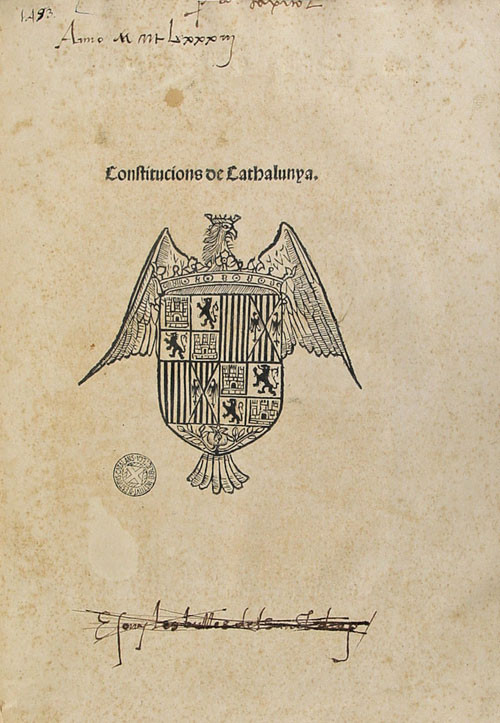
Compilation of 1493

Compilation of 1585

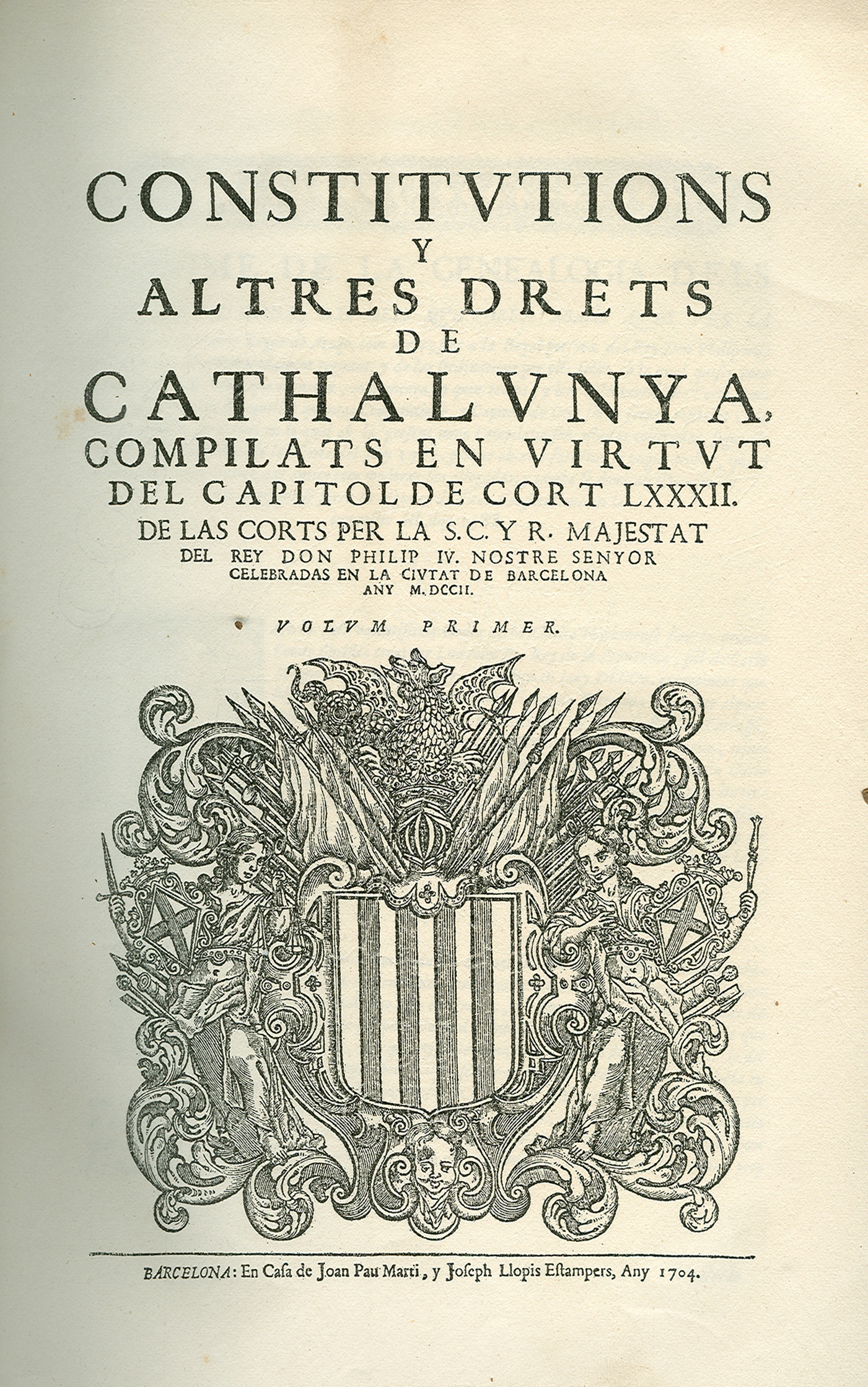
Compilation of 1704

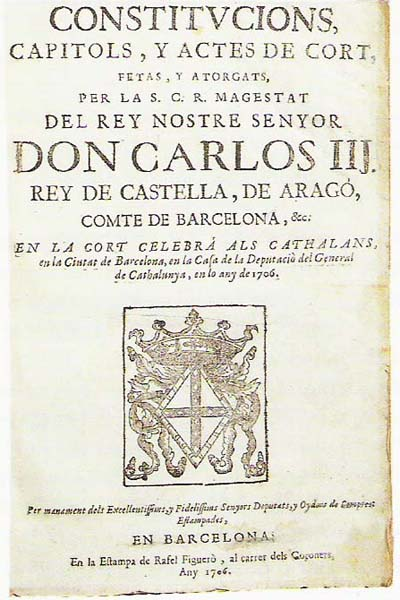
Constitutions approved in 1706

== Examples of constitutions ==
=== Catalan jurisdiction ===
"In Catalonia, cases or sentences from foreign courts are not heard or resolved." -Courts of Barcelona, 1283.

"Since the constitutions and other laws by which the Catalan land is governed are drawn up solely and exclusively by the Courts of Catalonia, only they have the power and force to repeal or amend them, so that orders contrary to the uses, general or special privileges, chapters of courts or constitutions, must not be obeyed nor complied, even if they had been dictated by the king or his heir." -Courts of Barcelona, 1422.

=== Rule of law ===
"It would be of little use to make laws and constitutions if they were not strictly observed and rigorously complied with by all citizens and especially by the king and his officials. Therefore, confirming the Usages of Barcelona, we want and command that they be observed to the letter, so that no contravention of the uses, practices, customs or constitutions of Catalonia is valid, even if they were dictated by the king or his officials." -Courts of Monzón, 1289, and Courts of Barcelona, 1481.

=== Secret of correspondence ===
"To suppress the ease with which some royal officials opened and read letters that came and went by the post or ordinary mail under the pretext of doing so to suit the royal interest, and in the same way the greed of the postmen or senior postmen in demanding payment for the letters in silver coin.

Therefore, for the greater freedom of trade, we decree and order with the praise and approval of the present Court: that no royal officer, not even the lieutenant general or the captain general, may open or read the letters that come and go by the ordinary couriers or mails, and likewise, that the amounts of said letters that come and go from the Spanish Peninsula must be demanded in ardit or billon currency only [...], and that those who contradict this constitution be condemned for non-observance, and likewise the postmaster general and his officers who allow letters to be opened in their homes without notifying the consistory of deputies and auditors of the violence which the consistory is obliged to come to the defense with the penalty of one third of his salary." -Courts of Barcelona: Constitution 22/1706.

== See also ==
- Principality of Catalonia
- Parliament of Catalonia
- Tribunal de Contrafaccions
- Civil Code of Catalonia
- Law of Andorra
- Furs of Valencia

== Bibliography ==
- Ferro, Víctor (1987). El Dret Públic Català. Les Institucions a Catalunya fins al Decret de Nova Planta. Vic: Ed. Eumo. ISBN 84-7602-203-4.
- Kagay, Donald J. (1994). The Usatges of Barcelona: The fundamental law of Catalonia. USA.: University of Pennsylvania Press. ISBN 0-8122-1535-4.

=== Primary sources ===
- Constitucions de Catalunya del 1495 on Wikisource.
- Furs, capítols, provisions e actes de cort fets y atorgats per la S.C.R.M. del rey don Phelip nostre senyor, ara gloriosamente regnant. Monçó, 1626 ("Fueros, chapters, provisions and acts of court made and awarded by the S.C.R.M. of King Philip our lord, who reigns gloriously") on Wikisource.
- Constitutions y altres drets de Cathalunya, Barcelona, 1704 on Wikisource.
- Chapters of the Corts of Monzón digitalized, at the Spanish Ministry of Culture record image (fragment referent to the Consulate of the Sea).
