= Nueva Planta decrees =

Centralization decrees after the War of Spanish Succession

Nueva Planta decrees Decretos de Nueva Planta Decrets de Nova Planta
- Territorial extent: Kingdom of Aragon; Kingdom of Valencia; Kingdom of Mallorca; Principality of Catalonia
- Passed: 29 June 1707 (Aragon and Valencia); 28 November 1715 (Mallorca); 16 January 1716 (Catalonia)
- Signed by: Philip V, king of Spain

Repeals
- Furs of Valencia (completely); Fueros of Aragon, Constitutions of Catalonia, Franqueses de Mallorca (partially)
- Status: Unknown

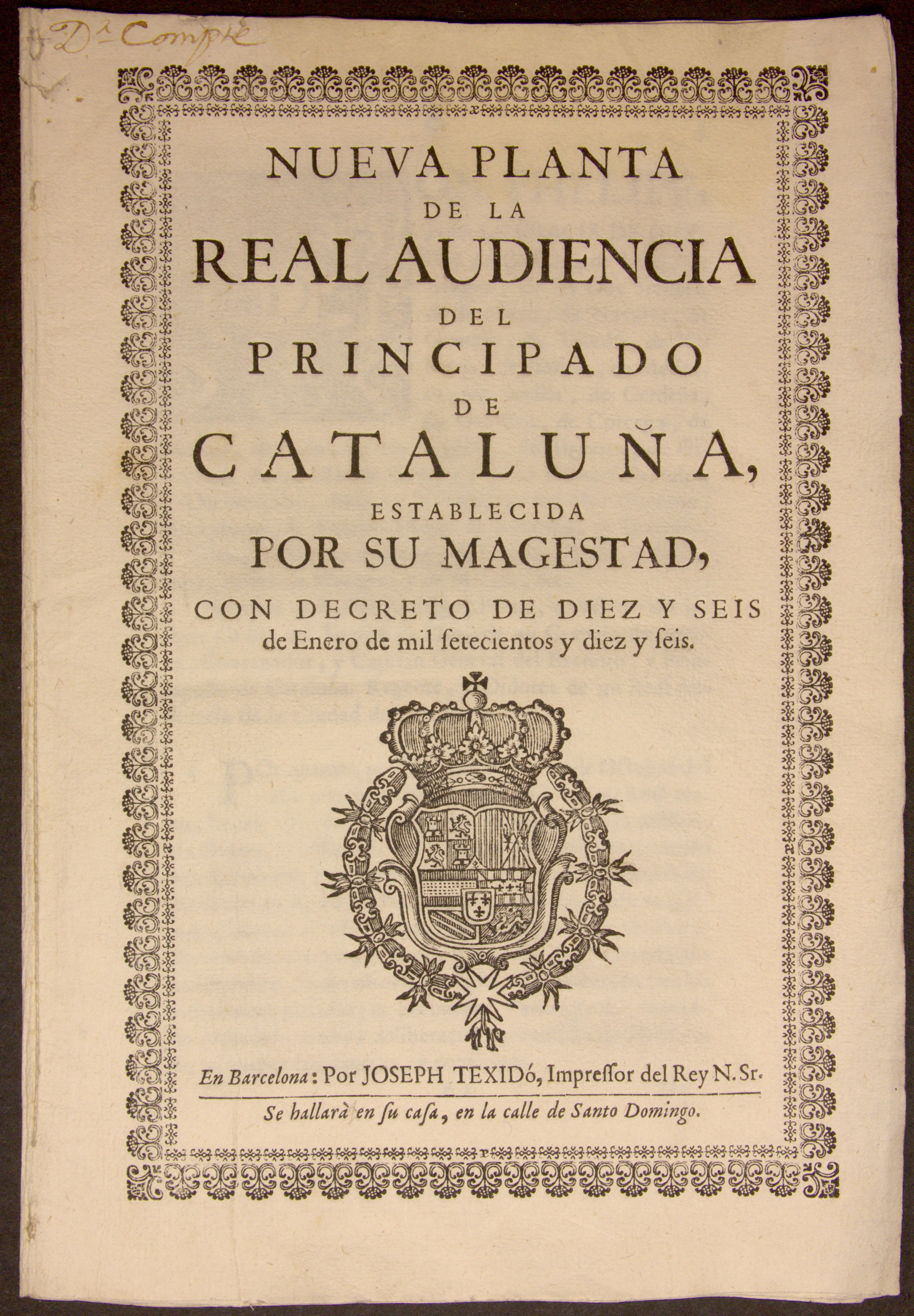
Cover of the Nueva Planta decrees of the Principality of Catalonia

The Nueva Planta decrees (Spanish: Decretos de Nueva Planta, Catalan: Decrets de Nova Planta, English: "Decrees of the New Plant") (Note: Planta ("plant"), in this context, meant "structure" or "establishment" (i.e. akin to a secondary sense of the English language plant, e.g. an "industrial building").) were a number of decrees signed between 1707 and 1716 by Philip V, the first Bourbon King of Spain, during and shortly after the end of the War of the Spanish Succession by the Treaty of Utrecht.

The decrees put an end to the existence of the realms of the Crown of Aragon (Aragon, Catalonia, Valencia and Majorca) as separate states within a composite monarchy and incorporated them into the Crown of Castile, thus abolishing the political differences of the two crowns and essentially establishing the Kingdom of Spain as a French-style absolute monarchy and a centralized state in the pre-liberal sense.

== Historical context ==
Angered by what he saw as sedition by the realms of the Crown of Aragon, who had supported the claim of Charles of Austria to the Spanish thrones during the war and taking his native France as a model of a centralised state, Philip V suppressed the institutions, privileges, and the ancient charters (Spanish: fueros, Catalan: furs) of almost all the areas that were formerly part of the Crown of Aragon, the Kingdom of Aragon, the Principality of Catalonia, the Kingdom of Valencia, and the Kingdom of Majorca. The decrees ruled that all the territories in the Crown of Aragon except the Aran Valley were to be ruled by the laws of Castile ("the most praiseworthy in all the Universe" according to the 1707 decree), embedding those regions into a new, and nearly uniformly administered, centralised Spain.

The other historic territories (Navarre and the other Basque territories) supported Philip V initially, whom they saw as belonging to the lineage of Henry III of Navarre, but after Philip V's military campaign to crush the Basque uprising, he backed down on his intent to suppress home rule.

The acts abolishing the charters were promulgated in 1707 in the kingdoms of Valencia and Aragon, in 1715 in the Kingdom of Majorca and in 1716 in the Principality of Catalonia.

== Effects ==
The decrees effectively created a centralized Spanish state and Spanish citizenship by abolishing all legal distinctions between the Castilians and the Aragonese, Catalans, Valencians and Majorcans. One of the main goals of the decrees was the replacement of the administrative and public law of each entity of the Crown of Aragon. The consequence was the abolition of the political institutions that they developed over the previous centuries, including their representative and legislative bodies, the Courts of Aragon, the Courts of Catalonia and the Courts of Valencia. From that point on, the members of the abolished Courts were summoned to the Cortes of Castile, now operating as the unified Cortes of Spain, except in Navarra.

The decrees erased all internal borders and tariffs except for the Basque territory and granted all citizens of the newly created Spanish state the right to trade with the American and Asian colonies, which henceforth were no longer the exclusive domain of the Crown of Castile.

The top civil servants were to be appointed directly from Madrid, and most institutions in what had become subnational entities were abolished. Court cases could also be presented and argued only in Castilian, which became the sole language of government and displaced Latin, Catalan and the other languages of Spain. However, the application of Castilian as a single administrative language had one exception in the Vizcaya Chamber of the Valladolid Court, where the use of Basque was permitted.

=== Catalonia ===
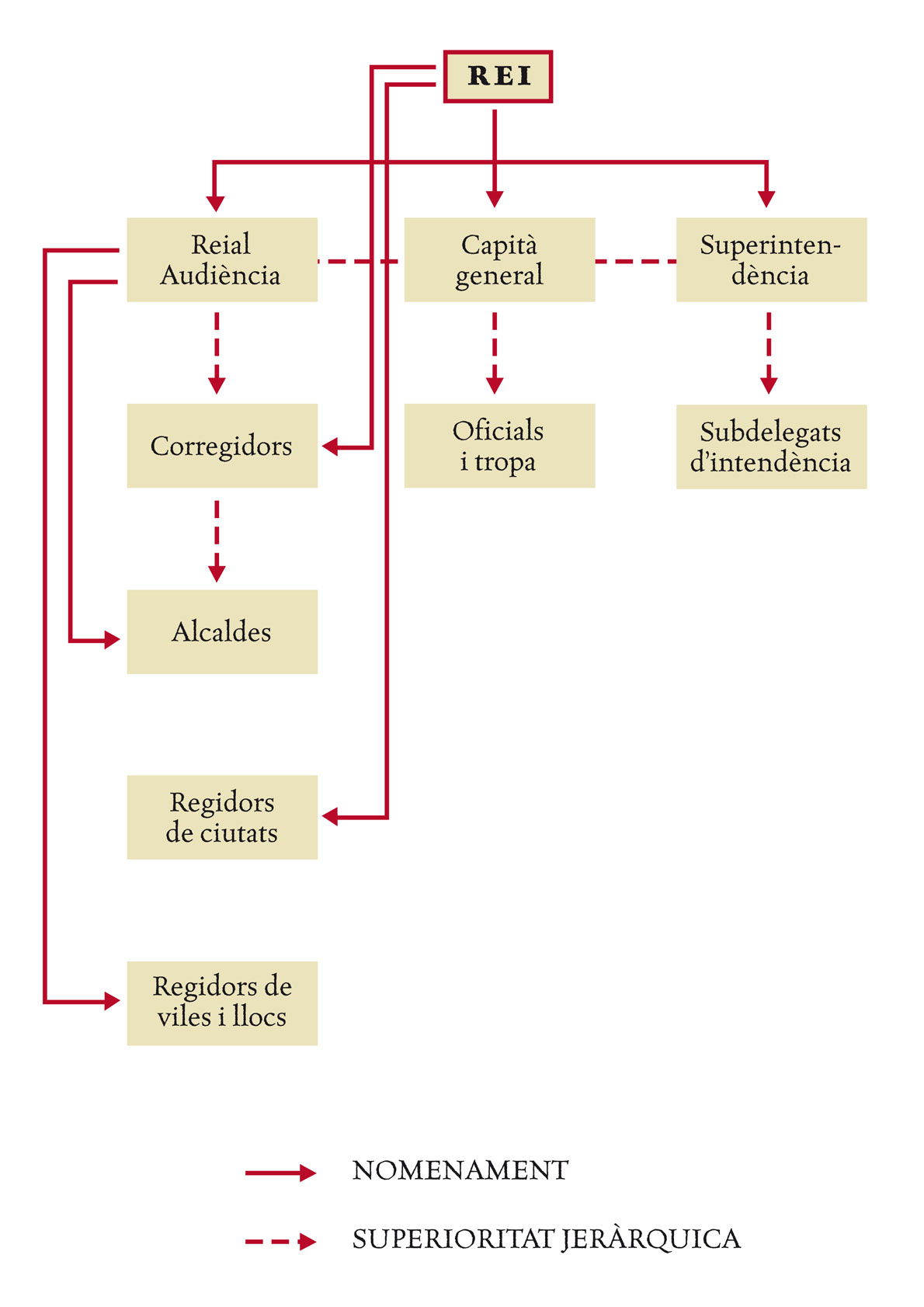
Absolutist government system imposed in Catalonia via Nueva Planta, based on three political institutions: The new Royal Audience to enforce the law, the Captain-General who also led the army that guaranteed the occupation, and the Superintendent who collected the heavy taxation that was imposed on the Principality. Most local appointments depended directly on the King

The fourth decree, which affected the Principality of Catalonia, was issued on October 9, 1715, and dispatched by Royal Decree from January 16, 1716.

- It abolished the Generalitat of Catalonia, the General Court of Catalonia, the Consell de Cent of Barcelona, the Conference of the Three Commons and the Court of Contraventions, as well as most of the traditional royal officers of the Principality.
- Furthermore, the viceroy was replaced by a Captain General, and Catalonia was divided into twelve corregimientos, like Castile, replacing the traditional vegueries, although the local batlles (sheriffs) were maintained.
- The Royal Audience of Catalonia became the highest body of the Principality, from which the Captain General of Catalonia, appointed by the king, would rule without the previous formal limitations and counterbalances, thus ensuring the application of the new absolutist system.
- The Royal Audience of Catalonia lost its previous status as supreme court, becoming a territorial court subject to the Council of Castile, which was given the power to be a court of last instance.
- The mayors and members of the local councils from the corregimiento's capitals would be directly chosen by the king. Additionally, the until then strict mechanisms of fiscalization of the local councils were eliminated.
- The sometents (popular militias of Catalonia) were banned.
- The cadastre was established, taxing urban and rural properties, the benefits of labor, commerce, and industry, suddenly multiplying the tax burden in the Principality (already devastated after the war) sevenfold.
- Catalan was replaced as the administrative language of the Royal Audience by Spanish.
- The six Catalan universities (including the University of Barcelona) were closed, being replaced by a royal university in the town of Cervera.

The decree maintained Catalan private, criminal, and mercantile law, as well as the Consulate of the Sea, however, without its own legislative body, Catalan criminal and mercantile laws gradually became obsolete and were eroded by various royal ordinances throughout the 18th century. It did not affect the political-administrative regime of the Aran Valley due to the Querimonia, which is why it was not incorporated into the new corregedorias into which the Principality of Catalonia was divided. The Valleys of Andorra also avoided the application of Nueva Planta primarily due to the Bishop of Urgell, Simeó de Guinda, who convinced the new Bourbon authorities that Andorra had always been neutral and unrelated to the Principality of Catalonia, resulting in the definitive political separation of Andorra from Catalonia. Currently, the pre-1716 Catalan private law still exists, modernized and codified via the Civil Code of Catalonia.

While theoretically the replacement of Catalan by the Spanish language solely affected the Royal Audience, the king provided with secret instructions to the newly appointed royal officers in Catalan territory to progressively enforce the use of Spanish: they "will take the utmost care to introduce the Castilian [Spanish] language, for which purpose he will give the most temperate and disguised measures so that the effect is achieved, without the care being noticed."

== See also ==
- Perfect Fusion
- Acts of Union 1707 between Scotland and England, creating the Kingdom of Great Britain
- Bourbon Reforms of Philip V and his successors
- Constitutions of Catalonia
- Furs of Valencia
