= Joan Bastardas i Parera =

Spanish latinist and romance philologist

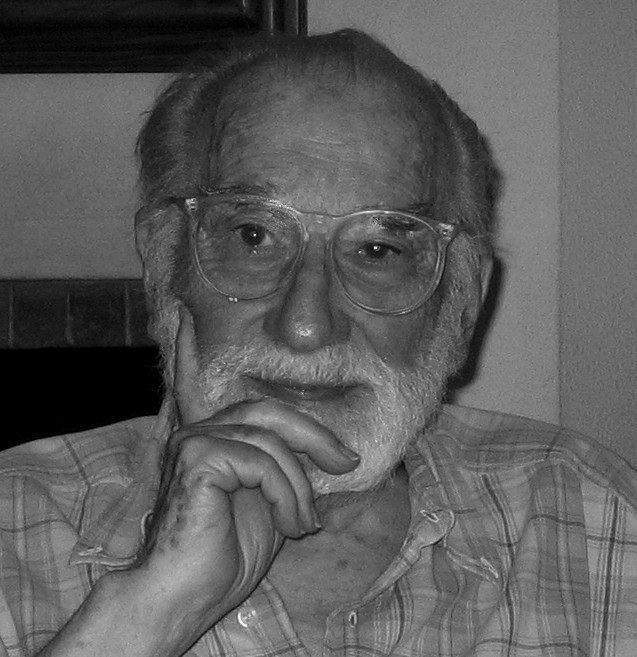
Joan Bastardas i Parera in 2008

Joan Bastardas i Parera (1919– 31 January 2009) was a Spanish Latinist and Romance philologist born in Barcelona. He was the son of the lawyer and politician Albert Bastardas i Sampere. He studied at the University of Barcelona, with Marià Bassols de Climent, and wrote a PhD dissertation on Medieval Latin syntax, for which he received the Antonio de Nebrija Prize (1951). He was also indirectly a student of the Swedish Latinist Dag Norberg.

He was first appointed lecturer, then assistant (1967), and finally obtained a chair in Latin Philology (1976) at the University of Barcelona. His research was devoted to Medieval Latin (particularly Hispanic Medieval Latin) and to preliterary Catalan. He was director (1960-1985) of the Glossarium Mediae Latinitatis Cataloniae, a dictionary of the Medieval Latin of Catalonia, a research project which is part of the global project Novum Glossarium Mediae Latinitatis of the Union Académique Internationale.

He was a member of the Fundació Bernat Metge committee, which publishes a series of Greek and Latin authors with a Catalan translation. He also collaborated to the Enciclopedia Lingüística Hispánica.

In 1972 he was elected a member of the Institut d'Estudis Catalans, where he was also vice-president (1983-1986) and director of the "Lexicographic Office". He was also appointed as a member of the Acadèmia de Bones Lletres de Barcelona in 1977; his entering speech dealt with the Usatges de Barcelona (customary laws of Barcelona; 12th century).

He was awarded the cross "Creu de Sant Jordi" by the Generalitat de Catalunya (1991), the prize Manuel Sanchis Guarner (1996), the essay prize by the Institució de les Lletres Catalanes (1997) and the medal of the Institut d’Estudis Catalans (1997).

== Selected works ==
- Particularidades sintácticas del latín medieval: Cartularios españoles de los siglos VIII al XII (1953). [PhD dissertation. Prize Antonio de Nebrija]
- Usatges de Barcelona. El codi a mitjan segle XII (Barcelona: Fundació Noguera, 1984), editor ISBN 8439830858 [Usatici Barchinonae; customs of Barcelona, 12th century]
- La llengua catalana mil anys enrere (Barcelona: Curial, 1995) ISBN 9788472569041 [selected articles on preliterary Catalan]
- Diàlegs sobre la meravellosa història dels nostres mots (Barcelona: Edicions 62, 1997) ISBN 9788429740769
- Els “camins del mar” i altres estudis de llengua i literatura catalana (Barcelona: Publicacions de l'Abadia de Montserrat, 1998) ISBN 9788478269259
- Llegir i entendre. Estudis dispersos (Barcelona: Universitat de Barcelona, 2012) ISBN 978-84-475-3572-9 [posthumous publication]
