= Usages of Barcelona =

Customs that became the basis for Catalan constitutions

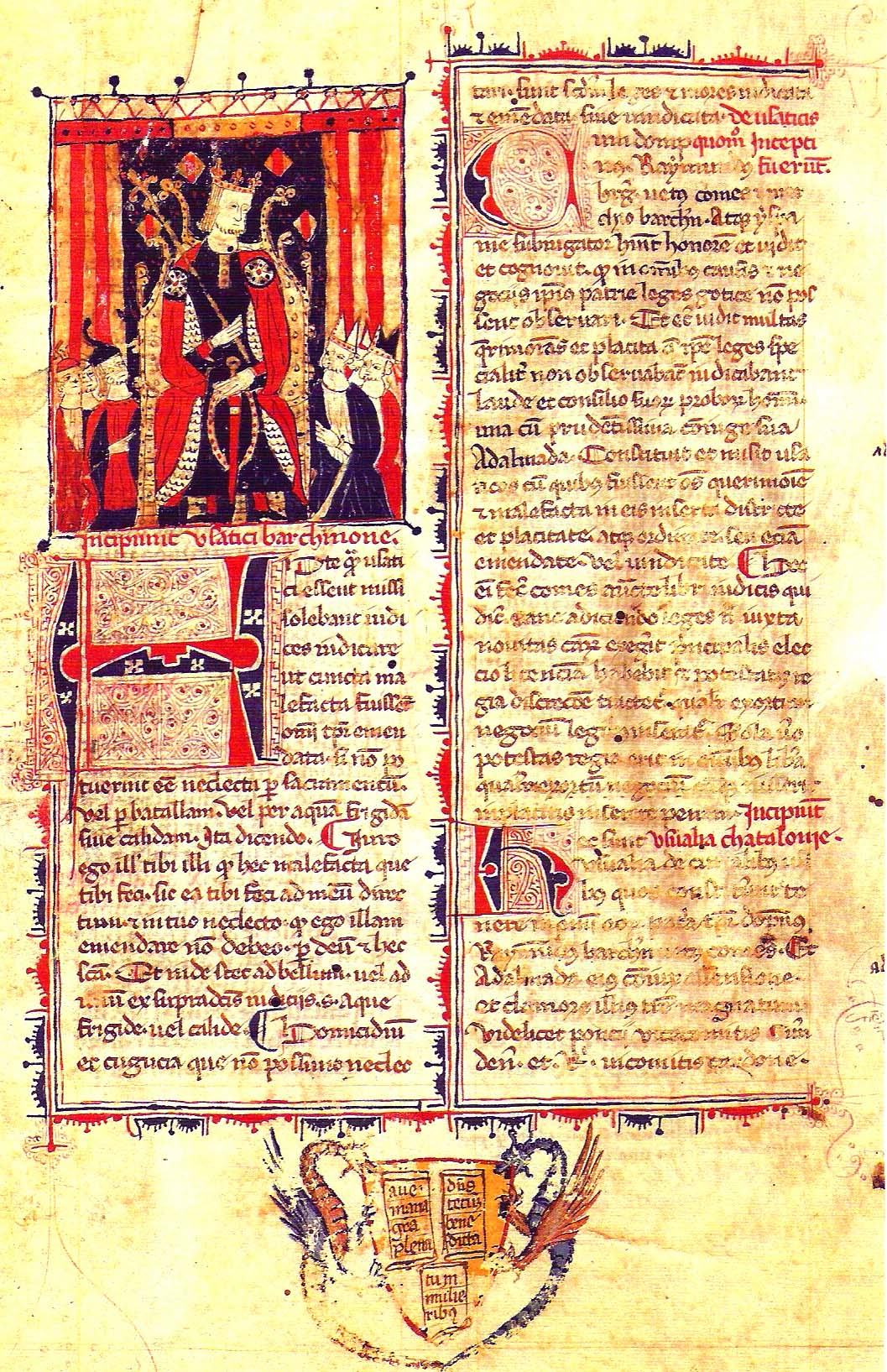
Manuscript of the Usages of Barcelona from circa 1173. In Latin (used for official documents during the Middle Ages): Usatici Barchinone

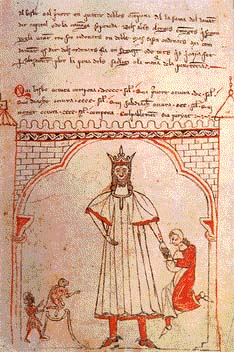
Depiction from 13th c., representing Ramón Berenguer I (1023–1076), Count of Barcelona receiving a vassal to his Court

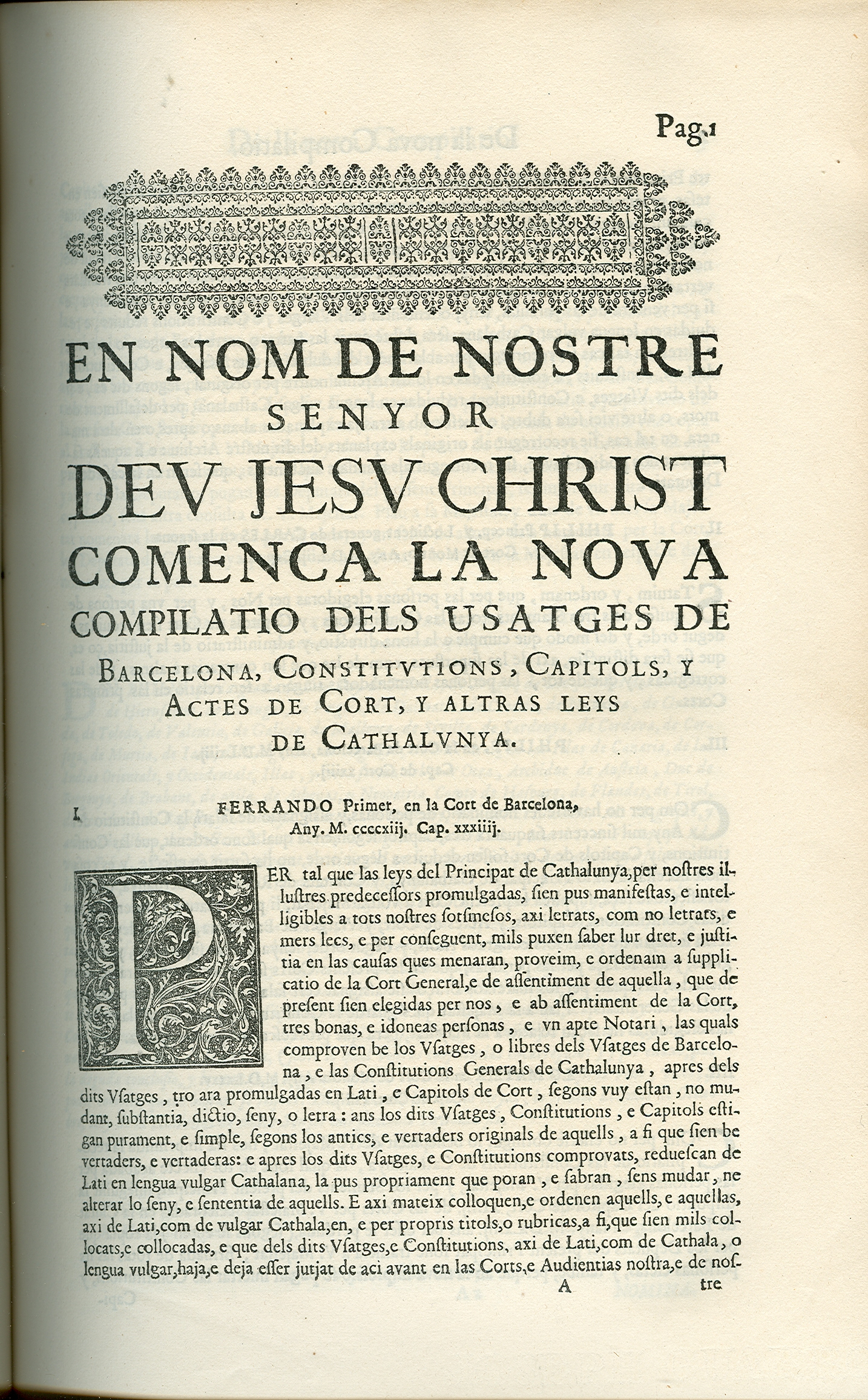
The usages printed in the Catalan language in 1413: Usatges de Barcelona

The Usages of Barcelona (Catalan: Usatges de Barcelona, IPA: [uˈzadʒəz ðə βəɾsəˈlonə]; Latin: Usatici Barchinonae) were the customs that form the basis for the Catalan Constitutions. They are the fundamental laws and basic rights of Catalonia, dating back to their codification in the twelfth century.

The Usages combined fragments of Roman and Visigothic law with the resolutions of the comital court of Barcelona and the religious canons of ecclesiastic synods. The first Usages were compiled and codified by Ramon Berenguer I, Count of Barcelona (1035–1076), to repair the deficiencies of Gothic law. However, the evidence for Ramon's work dates from the codes of James the Conqueror of a later date (reigned 1213–1276). James, seeing that some judges ruled by Gothic law and some by Roman law, according to a tradition of usus terrae (local custom), approached the Catalan Courts in 1251 to establish the primacy of the Usages. Though the Usages applied legally only to the Barcelonan county, in practice they were applied to the entire Principality of Catalonia.

The Usages incorporated several other competing codes of the same era:

- Usages of Girona
- Customs of Lleida
- Customs of Tortosa
- Furs of Valencia
- Franquesas of Majorca
- Chapter of Athens and Neopatria

The oldest manuscript containing the Usages dates from the end of the 12th century. Between the 15th and 18th centuries, they were copied frequently. The Nueva Planta decrees superseded them with the central legislation of the Bourbons, though continued to have some force.

== Edition ==
- Bastardas, Joan (ed.): Usatges de Barcelona. El codi a mitjan segle XII. Barcelona: Fundació Noguera, 1984
