= General Court of Catalonia =

Historic legislature of Catalonia

General Court of Catalonia Cort General de Catalunya (Catalan)
- Principality of Catalonia

Type
- Type: Tricameral (Estate divided)
- Houses: Braços: Ecclesiastical estate Military estate Royal estate

History
- Established: 1214/1218
- Disbanded: 1714
- Preceded by: Comital Court; Peace and Truce Assemblies
- Succeeded by: Courts of Castile; Parliament of Catalonia (1932, partially, indirectly)

Leadership
- Count of Barcelona: James I (first, 1214); Charles III (last, 1705)
- Seats: 550^{1}

Elections
- Voting system: Ennoblement or inheritance, appointment as cleric with the right of assistance, or election with limited suffrage or by insaculation

Meeting place
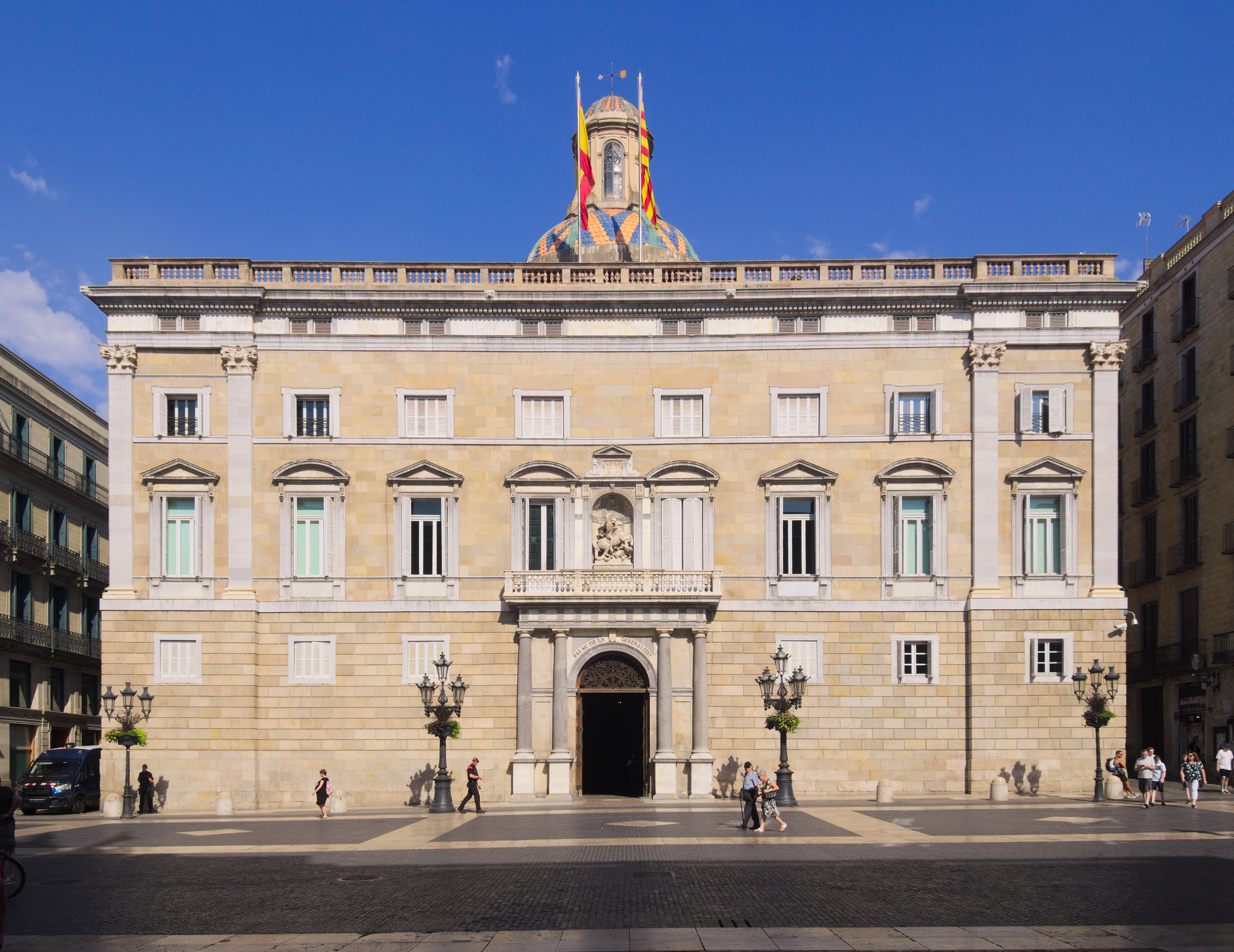
- Itinerant, different places of Catalonia. The Palau de la Generalitat was the place where the last Courts (1705–1706) met

Footnotes
- ^{1}Reflecting composition of the Courts of 1705–1706

The General Court of Catalonia (Catalan: Cort General de Catalunya) or General Court of the Principality of Catalonia (Catalan: Cort General del Principat de Catalunya), also called historiographically Catalan Courts (Catalan: Corts Catalanes), was the parliamentary body of the Principality of Catalonia from the 13th to the 18th century. The Catalan Courts were the result of the territorial and institutional evolution of the Comital Court of Barcelona (council of the count of Barcelona), and took its definitive institutional form in 1283, according to historian Thomas Bisson.

Composed by the king and the three estates of the realm, it has been considered by several historians as a model of medieval parliament. Scholar Charles Howard McIlwain wrote that the General Court of Catalonia had a better defined organization than the parliaments of England or France. Unlike the Courts of Castile, which at the time functioned mainly as an advisory body to which the king granted privileges and exemptions, the Catalan Courts was a regulatory body, as their decisions had the force of law, in the sense that the king could not unilaterally revoke them, being the first parliament of Europe that officially obtained the power to pass legislation, alongside the monarch. It is comparable to similar institutions across Europe, such as the Parliament of England and the diets of the German lands.

The General Courts of the Crown of Aragon were the simultaneous meeting of the Courts of Aragon, the Courts of Valencia and the Courts of Catalonia. The Kingdom of Majorca did not convene Courts and thus sent their representatives to the Courts of the Principality. As the courts could not be held outside of Aragon nor the Principality, they were frequently held in Monzón or in Fraga, both claimed by Aragon and Catalonia due to their location on the eastern bank of the Cinca river.

The Catalan Courts met for almost five centuries, until they were abolished by the Nueva Planta decrees of 1716. Thereafter the Courts of Castile operate as the unified Courts of Spain, except in Navarra. Despite some attempts to reestablish the Courts, Catalonia only recovered a legislative assembly in 1932, in the form of the current Parliament of Catalonia.

== Composition and legislative procedure ==
The Courts were made up of three arms (Catalan: braços), representatives of the three estates of the realm: the military estate (Braç Militar) which included representatives from the nobility, the ecclesiastical estate (Braç Eclesiàstic) which saw representatives from the religious hierarchy and the royal estate (Braç Reial) which had representatives (known as síndics) from the municipalities and villages.

The ecclesiastical arm was presided by the Archbishop of Tarragona and comprised the Catalan bishops, the prior of Catalonia of the Knights Hospitaller, the castellan of Amposta, the abbots with possession of the abbey, the priors of convents with chapter, without superior in the Principality and with mer and mixed imperium over their vassals, the commanders of the Knights Hospitaller (in principle) and the chapters of the cathedrals. They were excluded the lower secular clergy and the mendicant orders.

The Duke of Cardona was the president of the military arm, the other titular noblemen (marquises, counts and viscounts) as well as knights and other minor nobles were summoned to the Courts. Those who simply enjoyed military privilege did not participate (honored citizens of Barcelona and honored bourgeois of Perpignan and doctors of law and medicine), but only those with vassals, even if they were commoners. Despite the requirement of Catalan naturalisation, foreign lords with Catalan vassals could attend the Courts.

By the royal arm, presided by the Chief Councilor of Barcelona, were made up of representatives (síndics) of the cities and towns under direct royal jurisdiction with the consolidated privilege of participating. The force of the custom meant that, if they stopped doing it (usually due to the financial cost involved) they had to obtain the right again. The settlements belonging to royal castles (rural places) were excluded because they were made up of scattered farmers without a town. Each city was represented by one síndic, except for Barcelona (five), Perpignan (three) and Lleida, Girona, Tortosa and Balaguer (two). The síndics were tied to their municipalities by an imperative mandate. Municipal commissions were in charge of ensuring the mandate through specific instructions and epistolary contact. The síndics could not disobey them even if it was by order of a third party, including the king, and they could be dismissed in case of serious misconduct.

The Courts were summoned and presided by the king as count of Barcelona who opened with a royal proclamation while the estates were in charge of legislating, always with the support of the sovereign. If the laws that were approved came from the king they received the name of "Constitutions" (Constitucions), if they came from the estates, "Court Chapters" (Capítols de Cort). If the king passed a law unilaterally it was called "Acts of Court" (Actes de Cort) and required ratification by the Courts.

== History ==
=== Origins ===
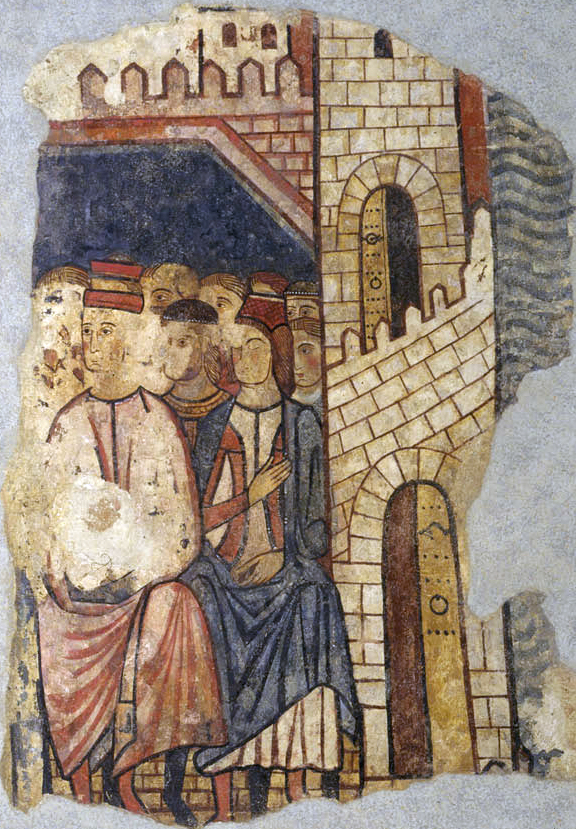
James I presiding over the early Catalan Courts of 1228, discussing the conquest of Mallorca. Mural painting from the Palau Berenguer d'Aguilar (Barcelona), c. 1285

The origin of the Catalan Courts is located in the Cort Comtal (County Court) of Barcelona, c. 1000 and was modelled on the Frankish Curia regis, and also followed the tradition of the meetings of the Peace and Truce that from 1021 met to discuss and agree on the termination of wars and feudal violence. One of the first precedents of the Catalan Courts date from 1192, the year in which the townspeople participated for the first time in the meeting of the Peace and Truce. The first Catalan legal code, the Usages of Barcelona, was promulgated by count Ramon Berenguer I based on the decisions of these assemblies.

The financial and military power of the counts of Barcelona was quite limited due to the impact of the Feudal Revolution during the regency of countess Ermesinde of Carcassonne (1018–1044). Their personal resources were particularly insufficient in periods of economic crisis or military expansion, of which they were many from the twelfth to the fifteenth centuries. The need to secure troops and revenue led to the steady expansion of the Count of Barcelona's court. After the formation of the Crown of Aragon in 1164 through the dynastic union of the County of Barcelona and the Kingdom of Aragon, it became the Royal Court.

The Royal Court of 1214 was convened by the papal legate, Cardinal Peter of Benevento in the Castle of la Suda, in Lleida and responded to the need to fix the confusing situation in the country after the death of King Peter of Aragon at the Battle of Muret (1213) and the beginning of the reign of his son James I who was only six years old. The new king of Aragon and count of Barcelona took his oath before prelates and magnates of the royal curia, representatives of cities and villages. At the time of James I (1208–1276), they met summoned by the king as representative of the social classes of the time. The Court of 1218 is the first that can be considered a General Court, because in 1214 there was a lack of representation of the municipalities and only one specific issue was debated.

=== Regulated Courts ===
Under the reign of Peter the Great (1276–1285), the Catalan Courts took institutional form.

==== Court of 1283 ====
In the Courts held in Barcelona in 1283, the king was forced to hold a General Court once a year, with representative participation of the time, to discuss the good of the state and land reform. The king himself stated: «Volem, statuïm e ordenam: que si nós o los successors nostres constitutió alguna general o statut fer volrem en Cathalunya, aquella o aquell façam de approbatió e consentiment dels prelats, dels barons, dels cavallers e dels ciutadans de Cathalunya, o ells apellats, de la major e de la pus sana part de aquells». (from Catalan: "We want, we statue and we order: if we and our successors want to make any general constitution or statute in Catalonia, we will submit them to the approval and consent of the prelates, of the barons, of the knights and of the citizens or, from those apellates, of the largest and healthiest part of those."). That decision represented a radical change in the legislative procedure of the Principality: the Catalan Courts became officially a legislative body as the king would need the consent of the Courts in order to pass the legislation.

==== Court of 1289 ====
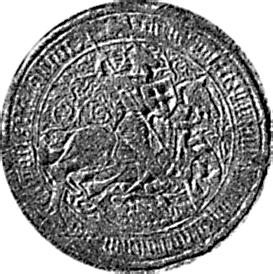
15th-century seal bearing the legend s(igillum) Cortium et Parlamentorum Generalium Principatus Cathalonie ("seal of the Courts and the Parliament of the Principality of Catalonia")

In the Courts held in Monzón in 1289, a delegation of the General Court was appointed as a permanent council to collect the "service" or tribute that the arms granted to the king at his request. Later, this would give rise to the Deputation of the General or Generalitat of Catalonia, in the fourteenth century. Its regulation was also used to create in the fifteenth century the Valencian Generalitat (1418).

==== Court of 1358–1359 ====
In the Parliament of 1358~1359, held in Barcelona, Vilafranca del Penedès and Cervera under King Peter IV, Castile invaded the kingdoms of Aragon and Valencia. This caused a series of armed conflicts that resulted in considerable expenses to the Crown of Aragon. This circumstance prompted the Courts to appoint twelve deputies with executive powers in taxation and some oïdors de comptes ("auditors of accounts") who controlled the administration, constituting the Deputation of the General (Catalan: Diputació del General), later often known as "Generalitat", under the authority of Berenguer de Cruïlles, bishop of Girona, who is regarded as the first President of the Generalitat.

==== Court of 1480 ====
In these Courts, the first ones of Ferdinand II the Catholic, many issues that remained pending after the Catalan Civil War (1462–1472) were resolved: the role of the Deputation of the General, the pactism and the return of properties. These last two points materialized in the recognition of a defeat shared by both sides, with more focus on seeking the reconstruction of the country than on the repression of the defeated. In these Courts the chapter Poc valdría was approved, later called "Constitution of the Observance" (Constitució de l'Observança), in which the obligation of the king to fulfill and to respect the constitutions of Catalonia is picked up. The chapter instructed the Deputation of the General to ensure its compliance, included by both the king and his officers, and authorized it to revoke any unconstitutional order. It is considered a key piece of Catalan legal system, consecrating and guaranteeing the principle of legality.

=== Early modern history ===
==== Habsburg dynasty ====
In 1519, the Courts met in Barcelona to recognize the first unified monarch of all the crowns of Castile and Aragon (resulting in the composite Monarchy of Spain), Charles I, and to discuss the granting of financial assistance to the Royal court. It was during the king's stay in Barcelona that he got the news that Charles had been elected emperor of the Holy Roman Empire under the name of Charles V.

During the period of the Habsburgs, the Catalan Courts were summoned less and less because of a supposed brake from the absolute power of the king. Therefore, the Generalitat, as the body responsible for ensuring compliance with the constitutions of Catalonia, gained in strength and prominence. In order to solve the lack of representation and get advice of the troubles of the Principality, the Generalitat frequently summoned the Junta de Braços (States-General), a non legislative assembly composed by members of the Catalan Courts which were in Barcelona at that time.

During the reign of Philip IV (1621–1665) tensions between Catalan institutions and the Monarchy arouse. In the Courts of 1626 the king tried to pass the proposal of Union of Arms designed by his chief minister Gaspar de Guzmán, Count-Duke of Olivares, demanding a military contribution from every realm of the Spanish Crown, including the Principality of Catalonia. However, the Courts were never concluded, due to the opposition of the estates to the measures of Olivares, many of which were contrary to the Catalan constitutions. Those events, coupled with the increased discomfort among Catalan population led to the Reapers' War (1640–1652).

==== Last Courts and suppression ====
Proposition of convocation of the last Catalan Courts (1705–1706) by the disputed Habsburg king Charles III.

The last General Court of Catalonia, presided by the disputed Habsburg king Charles III were held in Barcelona in 1705–1706, which, according to historian Joaquim Albareda, represented an important advance in the guarantee of individual, civil and political rights (among them, the establishment of the secrecy of correspondence), while at the same time they consolidated most of the constitutional reforms of the last previous Courts (1701–1702) presided by the Bourbon Philip V, such as the Court of Contraventions (Catalan: Tribunal de Contrafaccions), established in order to ensure the application of the constitutions and solve and prosecute any act (included the ones done by the king or his officers) contrary to the Catalan legislation. Philip V wrote about those constitutional changes that "The last two Courts made Catalans more Republican than the English with their parliament".

The body was suppressed, like most of the other institutions and public law of the Principality of Catalonia, after the end of the War of Spanish Succession in 1714, by the Nueva Planta decrees of 1716 enacted by the new Spanish king, Philip V, essentially establishing an absolutist system of government modelled after the French one. From that point on, the representatives of Catalonia, Aragon and Valencia were incorporated into the Courts of Castile which, unlike the suppressed Courts of the realms of the Crown of Aragon, operated primarily as an advisory body.

The current Parliament of Catalonia, established in 1932 as the legislative body of the Generalitat of Catalonia (Catalan institution of self-government), is considered the historical successor of the Courts.

== List of general courts of Catalonia ==
What follows is a chronological list of the sessions of the General Court of the Principality of Catalonia. The Courts were convened a total of 104 times (7 of which weren't inaugurated) between the years 1214 and 1705. Neither the General Parliament of Barcelona of 1653 nor the Junta de Braços (Council of Estates) of 1640 and 1713 are included, as they're generally identified as assemblies of distinct nature from the General Court.

Monarch	Year	Place
James I	1214	Lleida
James I	1218	Vilafranca del Penedès
James I	1218	Tarragona
James I	1218	Barcelona
James I	1218	Lleida
James I	1225	Tortosa
James I	1228	Barcelona
James I	1234	Tarragona
James I	1235	Tarragona
James I	1236	Monzón
James I	1241	Girona
James I	1242	Lleida
James I	1250	Alcañiz
James I	1251	Barcelona
James I	1257	Lleida
James I	1260	Tarragona
James I	1264	Barcelona
James I	1275	Lleida
Peter II	1283	Barcelona
Alfons II	1289	Monzón
James II	1291	Barcelona
James II	1300	Barcelona
James II	1301	Lleida
James II	1307	Montblanc
James II	1311	Barcelona
James II	1318	Tortosa
James II	1321	Girona
James II	1323	Barcelona
James II	1327	Lleida (never inaugurated)
Alfons III	1331	Tortosa
Alfons III	1333	Montblanc
Peter III	1350-1351	Perpinyà
Peter III	1356	Perpinyà
Peter III	1358	Barcelona
Peter III	1359	Cervera
Peter III	1362	Barcelona
Peter III	1362-1363	Monzón
Peter III	1364	Barcelona and Lleida
Peter III	1365	Tortosa
Peter III	1365	Barcelona
Peter III	1367	Vilafranca and Barcelona
Peter III	1368-1369	Barcelona
Peter III	1370-1371	Tarragona, Montblanc and Tortosa
Peter III	1372-1373	Barcelona
Peter III	1375	Lleida
Peter III	1376	Monzón
Peter III	1377-1378	Barcelona
Peter III	1379-1380	Barcelona
Peter III	1383-1384	Monzón, Tamarit de Lliteira and Fraga
John I	1388-1389	Monzón
Martin I	1409	Barcelona
Ferdinand I	1413	Barcelona
Ferdinand I	1414	Montblanc
Alfons IV	1419-1420	Sant Cugat del Vallès and Tortosa
Alfons IV	1421-1423	Barcelona
Alfons IV	1429-1430	Tortosa
Alfons IV	1431-1434	Barcelona
Alfons IV	1435	Monzón
Alfons IV	1436-1437	Barcelona
Alfons IV	1440	Lleida
Alfons IV	1442-1443	Tortosa
Alfons IV	1446-1448	Barcelona
Alfons IV	1454-1458	Barcelona
John II	1459	Fraga and Lleida
John II	1460	Lleida
John II	1470	Monzón
John II	1473-1479	Perpinyà and Barcelona
Ferdinand II	1480-1481	Barcelona
Ferdinand II	1484	Tarazona (never inaugurated)
Ferdinand II	1493	Barcelona
Ferdinand II	1495	Tortosa
Ferdinand II	1503	Barcelona
Ferdinand II	1510	Monzón
Ferdinand II	1512	Monzón
Ferdinand II	1515	Lleida
Charles I	1519-1520	Barcelona
Charles I	1528	Monzón
Charles I	1529	Barcelona
Charles I	1533-1534	Monzón
Charles I	1537	Monzón
Charles I	1542	Monzón
Charles I	1547	Monzón
Charles I	1552	Monzón
Philip I	1564	Barcelona and Monzón
Philip I	1585	Monzón and Binéfar
Philip II	1599	Barcelona
Philip III	1626 and 1632	Barcelona
Philip III	1640	Montblanc (never inaugurated)
Philip IV	1701-1702	Barcelona
Charles III	1705-1706	Barcelona

== See also ==
- Parliament of Catalonia
- Junta de Braços
- Generalitat of Catalonia
- Cortes Generales
- History of democracy
- History of parliamentarism

== Bibliography ==
- Morales Roca, Francisco José (1983). Próceres habilitados en las Cortes del Principado de Cataluña, siglo XVII (1599–1713). Ediciones Hidalguia. ISBN 9788400054311.
- Ferro, Víctor (1987). El Dret Públic Català. Les Institucions a Catalunya fins al Decret de Nova Planta. Vic: Ed. Eumo. ISBN 84-7602-203-4.
- Fernández Álvarez, Manuel (2001). Carlos V, el César y el hombre (in Spanish). Barcelona: Círculo de Lectores. ISBN 84-226-8919-7.
- Sánchez, Isabel (2004). La Diputació del General de Catalunya (1413–1479). Institut d'Estudis Catalans. ISBN 9788472837508.
