= Furs of Valencia =

Laws of the medieval Kingdom of Valencia

Furs of Valencia (Valencian: Furs de València, IPA: [ˈfuɾz ðe vaˈlensi.a]) were the laws of the Kingdom of Valencia during most of the Middle Ages and early modern Europe. The laws were a series of charters which, altogether, worked similarly as a modern constitution does now. Thus, they defined the position of and checks and balances between the royal house, the nobility, the Catholic ecclesiastics and the judiciary. The first codifications are based in the Usages of Barcelona, Costums of Lleida, and the Furs of Aragon.

They were promulgated by the first King of Valencia, James I of Aragon in 1261 at the newly created Valencian Parliament; he then subjected the title of King of Valencia to an oath of office before the Parliament, sworn on the Furs.

The Furs were valid for more than four centuries, until they were abolished by means of the Nueva Planta decrees signed by Philip V of Castile in 1707. Following the agreed amendment to the Statute of Autonomy of the Valencian Community in 2006, some distinct usages of the civil law used by the Furs are scheduled to regain binding legal authority in this territory.

== See also ==
- Kingdom of Valencia
- List of Valencian monarchs
- Generalitat Valenciana
- Valencian Parliament
- Constitutions of Catalonia
