= Tribunal de Contrafaccions =

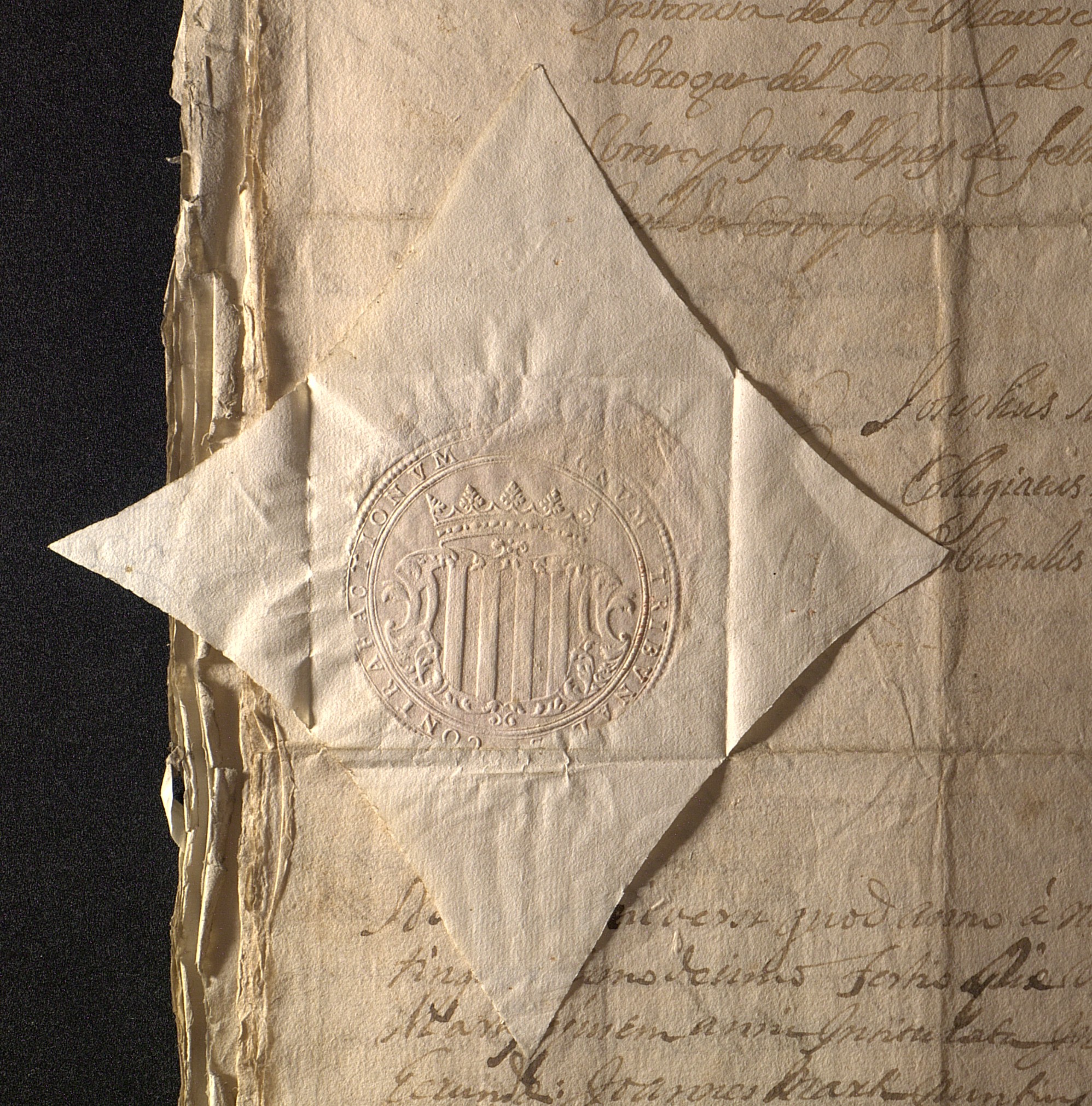
Seal of the Court of Contraventions.

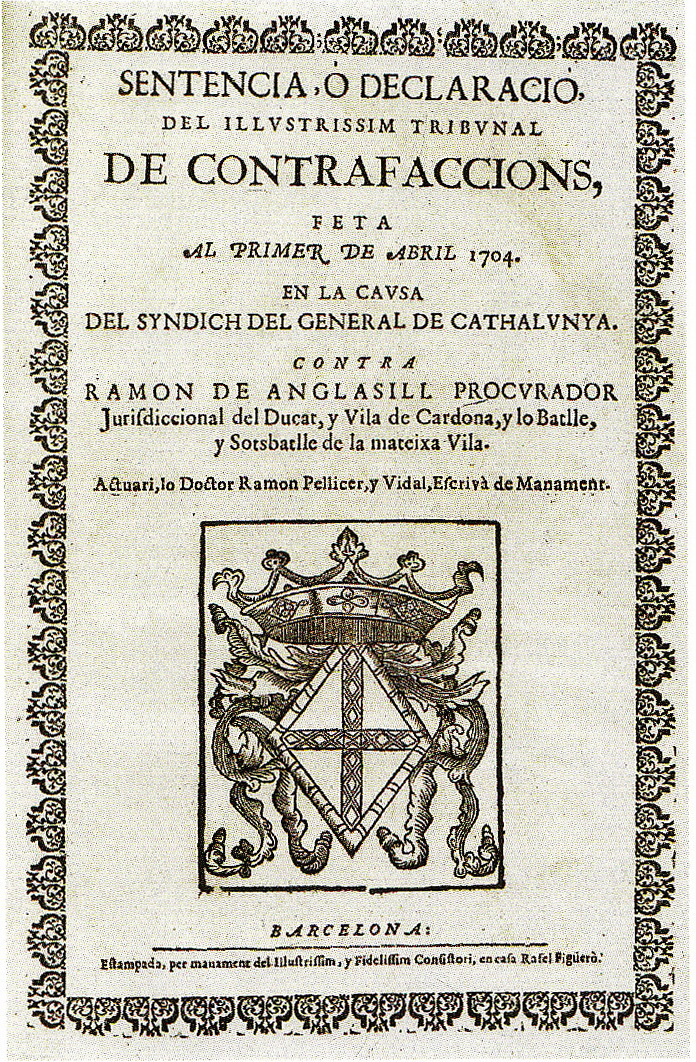
A court ruling of the Tribunal de Contrafaccions issued on April 1, 1704

The Tribunal de Contrafaccions (Catalan for: "Court of Contraventions") was a court of justice of the Principality of Catalonia that guaranteed the application of the Catalan constitutions, as well as solving and prosecuting any actions contrary to the Catalan legislation, including the ones performed by the king or his officers. Its members were elected in parity by the institutions of the land and the king. It represented an important advance in the guarantee of individual and civil rights, even at the European context of the time, thus seen by scholars as one of the first precedents of a constitutional court.

It was established by the General Court of Catalonia of 1701-1702 presided over by Philip V of Spain, the first Bourbon king to reign in the Spanish Monarchy. It was improved by the Courts of 1705-1706 presided over by Charles III, the Habsburg rival of Philip to the Spanish throne during the War of the Spanish Succession. Later on, at the end of the war in 1714, it was abolished following the Catalan defeat, thus marking a decisive step towards the imposition of absolutism.

== Bibliography ==
- Capdeferro, Josep and Serra, Eva (2014). La defensa de les constitucions de Catalunya: el Tribunal de Contrafaccions (1702–1713). Generalitat de Catalunya. Departament de Justícia ISBN 978-84-393-9203-3
