= Mieres uprising =

Military conflict

The Mieres uprising (Catalan: Alçament de Mieres) was a peasant revolt which occurred on 22 September 1484 in the valley of Mieres (Garrotxa). It was led by Pere Joan Sala, and precipitated by the attempted seizure of the property of farmers that were not willing to accede to the droit du seigneur. It was the beginning of the Second War of the Remences (Peasants' War).

The revolt came about in the environment following the Catalan Civil War, and the king's 1481 approval of a constitution favouring the rights of the nobility over those of the remensas.
