= Old Catalonia =

Old Catalonia (Catalan: Catalunya Vella) was a legal concept created by Catalan jurist Pere Albert in the second quarter of the thirteenth century to refer to the territories of Catalonia containing remensa peasants from the Diocese of Girona, the eastern half of the Diocese of Vic and the portion of the Archdiocese of Barcelona east of the Llobregat river.

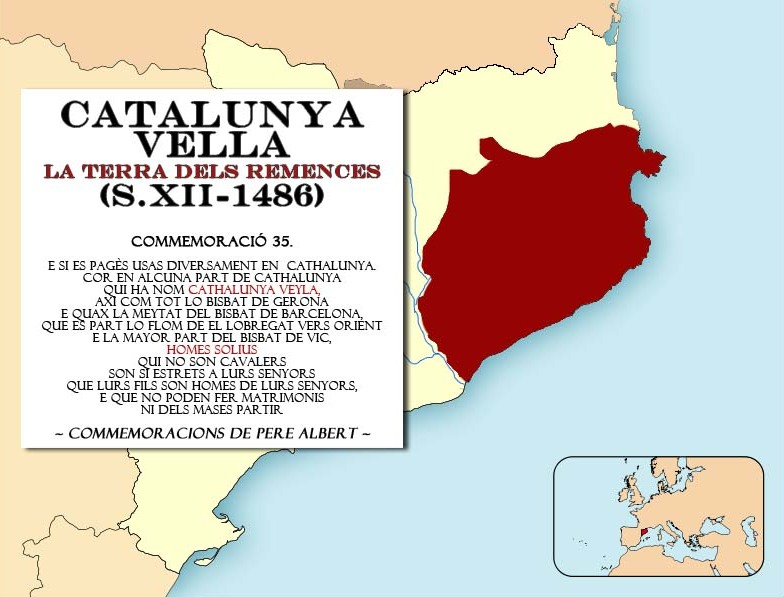
Old Catalonia (12th-15th century)

In the 9th and 10th centuries these territories, like all of ancient Gothia or Marca Hispanica had been an area of relative freedom for the peasants. But in the 11th century, as a result of the feudal revolution and the weakening of the noble auctoritas, the nobles began to impose burdensome evil customs on the peasants. The situation worsened in the 12th century, when the nobility used their powers to attach the peasants to their lands, to keep them from fleeing to the new southern lands conquered by Ramon Berenguer IV, and by such attachment turning them into remensa peasants.

At the end of the thirteenth century, jurist and Canon Pere Albert wrote his Commemorations, a treatise on customary law that collected in one place all the procedures and customs currently in force in Catalonia. In order to define the territories where the remensa peasants were, Albert created the concept of Old Catalonia, defining it as Diocese of Girona, half the Archdiocese of Barcelona east of the Llobregat, and most of the Diocese of Vic. Old Catalonia was created in opposition to the notion of New Catalonia, which according to Albert had already received this name in the time of Ramon Berenguer IV in the 12th century. The boundary between Old and New Catalunya was marked by the Llobregat River. Albert discussed the legal situation of the peasants in point 35 of his Commemorations, and differentiated between peasants that were in Old Catalonia, and those in New Catalonia.

In the 15th century, after the War of the Remensas and the Catalan Civil War, King Ferdinand II of Aragon issued the 1486 decree Sentencia Arbitral de Guadalupe, which liberated the remensa peasants from the evil customs, thus rendering the concept of Old Catalonia obsolete.

== Early modern historiography ==
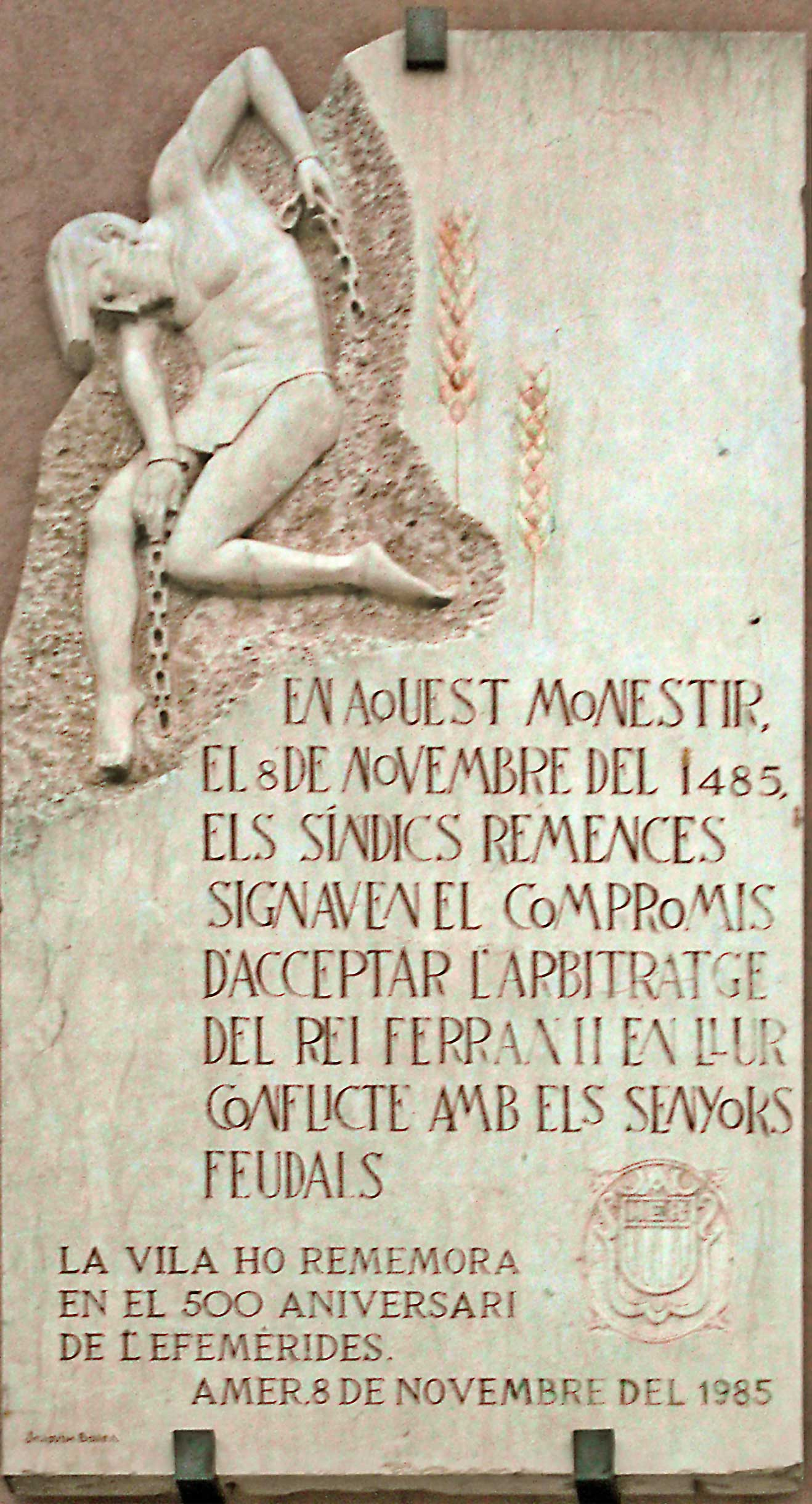
500th anniversary of the remensa decree Sentencia Arbitral de Guadalupe by Ferdinand II of Aragon which released them from the evil customs (monastery of Amer, Girona)

The name Catalunya Vella was picked up by later historians of the early modern period during the 16th and 17th century, such as Pere Gil, Onofre Manescal, Esteve de Corbera, and Francisco Diago; who found that the Counties of Roussillon, Cerdanya, Urgell, Pallars, and Ribagorza were not contained either in New Catalonia or in Old Catalonia by Pere Albert. Albert's imprecision on this point could be in response to the fact that in none of these territories were the Usages of Barcelona in effect, because these they were not under the jurisdiction of the counts of Barcelona. To fill in this gap, and merely for geographic purposes, historians such as Pere Gil created the name "Catalunya Novísima" (Very New Catalonia) to refer to the five counties.

== Recent historiography ==
The concept of Old Catalonia has simultaneously been used to refer, erroneously, to all of the Catalan counties before the conquest of New Catalonia. In addition, this term has been used to refer to wet Catalonia, (Note: The Pyrennean region and isolated rainy areas of the Mediterranean system having more than 800mm of rainfall annually.) which excludes, however, the Mediterranean coastal area. The circumstance is that part of Old Catalonia roughly corresponds to the dialectal area of central Catalan, which extends as far south as the plain of Tarragona.

== See also ==
- Usages of Barcelona
