= Siege of Hostalric =

1462 siege in the Catalan Civil War

- Part of Catalan Civil War
Date	23 May 1462
Location	Hostalric, Catalonia 41°45′0″N 2°37′59.88″E

Belligerents
John the Faithless	Generalitat de Catalunya

Commanders and leaders
Francesc de Verntallat; Bernat Joan de Cabrera	Pere de Bell-lloc

Strength
300	500

The siege of Hostalric was the first major action of the War Against John II. It took place on 23 May 1462.

== Background ==
In 1460, after John II imprisoned Charles of Viana, the Catalans at the Corts de Lleida formed the Council of the Principality (Consell del Principat) in opposition to the government of John in the Principality of Catalonia. The Consell demanded that John liberate Charles immediately and accept the Capitulation of Vilafranca, which prohibited John from entering Catalonia without the permission of the Generalitat so long as he disagreed with their legislation. John capitulated.

The subsequent death of Charles only three weeks after his liberation threatened the peace. The king sent his wife, Joana Enríquez, to Barcelona with the intention of overturning the capitulation and sowing discord among the Catalan factions. The relationship between the queen and the representatives of the Catalan government was strained during the six months she was in Barcelona with her son, Charles' successor as heir, Ferdinand. In March 1462 the queen and the prince left for Girona, while the pagesos de remença revolted against the government in hopes of receiving royal support and abolishing the mals usos.

== Leadup to battle ==
At Girona the queen convoked a general council on 23 April 1462. She reorganised the citizen militia and proceeded to repair the city's walls and towers. On 12 May she sent a force of 200 men to Bernat Joan de Cabrera, head of the garrison of Hostalric. On 13 May the Consell del Principat sent an ambassador to the castle to assure that the council's army, which was marching on Girona, would be well received.

In a final preparation for battle, Joana sealed an alliance with the leader of the remences, Francesc de Verntallat. The rebels agreed to bar the pass of the Consell's army at Hostalric, while Joana sent 600 men to reinforce the remences. A ship of arms and food was sent to Sant Feliu de Guíxols to gain time as the remences organised themselves.

== Siege ==
The army of the Consell was commanded by captain Pere de Bell-lloc i de Sentmenat. After easily frightening the remences of Verntallat into retreat on 23 May, Pere besieged Hostalric. The remences fled to Girona.

To impress upon the town the urgency of surrender, Pere began destroying the surrounding vineyards and wheat fields. The townspeople opened the gates to the Consell and the town fell without a fight. The castle too was surrendered without combat, but the Tower of Friars, defended by a single man, was attacked by the crossbowmen. Bernat Joan de Cabrera was taken prisoner. On 29 May the Consell sent the remainder of their army stationed at Barcelona to besiege Girona. Hostalric remained a stronghold of the Consell until the end of the war.

== Bibliography ==
- Sobrequés, Santiago and Jaume Sobrequés (1987). La guerra civil catalana del segle XV, 2nd ed., 2 vol. Edicions 62, ISBN 84-297-2699-3.
- Hernàndez, F. Xavier (2003). Història militar de Catalunya, Vol. III: La defensa de la Terra. Rafael Dalmau, ed. ISBN 84-232-0664-5.
- Atles d'Història de Catalunya. Edicions 62. ISBN 978-84-297-4061-5.
