= Juan Ramón Folch IV de Cardona =

Catalan nobleman

Joan Ramon Folc IV de Cardona or Juan Ramón Folch IV de Cardona, (1446 - Arbeca, 29 January 1513), was a Spanish nobleman.
He was the 5th Count of Cardona (1486-1491) and then the 1st Duke of Cardona (1491-1513), the 6th Count of Prades, the 6th Baron of Entença (1486-1513), Viscount of Villamur (1486-1513) and the 1st Marquis of Pallars Sobirá (1491-1513).

== Biography ==
He was the eldest son of John Ramon III, Count of Cardona and Joana of Urgell, daughter of James II of Urgell and Isabella of Aragon.

His youth was spent in the Catalan Civil War fighting for John II of Aragon alongside his father and Prince Ferdinand of Girona. At the age of 16, he was one of the defenders of Prince Ferdinand and Queen Juana in the siege of Girona (1462). In 1467, when Bernat Joan de Cabrera died, he was given the Constableship of the crown.

The same year he clashed with the Royal family through his marriage to Aldonza Enríquez, aunt of Prince Ferdinand, endowed with the incomes of Elche and Crevillent. As the grandson of James II of Urgell, the rebellious authorities of the Principality considered his candidacy for the crown before offering it to René of Anjou in 1466, but the Constable remained loyal to the Trastàmara's and continued fighting for them. In 1467 he was taken prisoner in the Battle of Viladamat and released only 3 years later.

After the war, he was Deputy of the Generalitat de Catalunya (1473-76) and one of the principal political personalities of the Principality. He was active at court between 1473-79. He negotiated the submission of Hugh Roger III, Count of Pallars Sobirà, his cousin (1480), but later led with his father the military conquest of this County of Pallars Sobirà (1484), as well as the second War of the Remences.

On the death of his father, in 1486, he was made Count of Cardona and Prades and Baron of Entença. In 1491 he was made Marquis of Pallars and 1st Duke of Cardona, dignities until then reserved for princes of the blood. Between 1485 and 1491 he had the Roussillon poet Francesc Moner at his service.

He died in 1513.

=== Marriage and children ===
In 1467, he married Aldonza Enríquez, half-sister of Juana Enríquez, later Queen of Aragon and mother of Ferdinand II of Aragon.
They had 14 children; among them:

- Fernando Ramon Folch, 2nd Duke of Cardona (c. 1469 - 1543), and several other titles,
- Antoni Folc de Cardona y Enriquez (died 1555), Viceroy of Sardinia (1534 - 1549),
- Enrique de Cardona y Enríquez (1485–1530), Roman Catholic Cardinal and Bishop of Barcelona,
- Luis Folc de Cardona y Enríquez, Archbishop of Tarragona (1531-1532) and President of the Generalitat de Catalunya (1524-1527).
- Juana Cardona Y Enriquez (died 1547), married 1503 to Antonio Manrique de Lara, 2nd Duke of Nájera,
- Isabel de Cardona y Enríquez de Quiñones (1480 - 1512), married in Arbeca, 1503, to Alonso Felipe de Aragón y Gurrea, II Duke of Luna.
