= Francesc de Verntallat =

Spanish nobleman, participant in the First War of the Remences

Francesc de Verntallat (Sant Privat d'en Bas, 1426 or 1428 - Sant Feliu de Pallerols, 1498 or 1499) was a Catalan nobleman who captained the Remensa Army in the War of the Remences, a conflict overshadowed by the Catalan Civil War. For this reason, de Verntallat was recompensed by King John II of Aragon, who named de Verntallat viscount of Hostoles. De Verntallat was a member of the Catalan lower noble class.

During the Second War of the Remences, de Verntallat stayed by the margins, representing moderate Remences who wished to solve the conflict through the avenue of mediation by the Catalan-Aragonese monarchy, which ultimately was produced by the Sentencia Arbitral de Guadalupe issued in 1486 by King Ferdinand II of Aragon.

When the Catalan Civil War broke out between the Generalitat and John II of Aragon "the Great", the lower nobility stood on the side of the King, who took the contact which was among the remensa peasantry and the gentlemen to bring to their cause the whole of the farmers.

Francesc de Verntallat organized a small army of laborers from Pyrennean areas that assaulted the Bestracà Castle, where the Lord kept a remensa who didn't want to or couldn't afford. He later besieged the castle of Castellfollit for a similar cause. During the siege of Girona, it was called by the Queen Juana Enríquez to help in the defense of the city, in which she and the Infante Ferdinand were blocked. Grateful for the performance of the remences, the Queen gave him the title of Royal Captain. From that moment his fully identified with the men began to be known as Verntallats.

Verntallat and his army occupied Olot, Castellfollit de la Roca, Banyoles, and the castles of the mountain, fought in numerical inferiority against the various forces of the Generalitat; Hugh Roger III of Pallars Sobirà, Henry IV of Castile, Peter of Portugal and John II, Duke of Lorraine.

The war had ups and downs until finally on 28 October 1472, the troops of John II came to Barcelona, where the Capitulation of Pedralbes was signed, by which the Principality of Catalonia retained its charters and privileges.

The Remences troops were organized in captaincies and subcaptaincies; thus, of every three tenants, two farmed the land of the third, which was mobilized. This recruitment system lasted in the different guerrilla forces that have occurred in the country. As the Catalan site Editorial Base points out, Verntallat could potentially have been a Catalan Robin Hood.

== Second Remensa War ==
When the Second Remensa War broke out in 1484, Verntallat did not join the rebellion led by Pere Joan Sala, who had been his lieutenant during the first war, but remained on the sidelines, and headed the moderate sector of the Remensa movement. After the defeat of Joan Sala, the Lords were seen as winners of the war and were willing to maintain and even to accentuate the evil customs, but Verntallat was able to keep possession of his mountain castles and his forces. Íñigo López de Mendoza y Quiñones, the Count of Tendilla, assigned by the King to the end of the war, sought out Verntallat as a representative of the peasants for the agreement of the Sentencia de Guadalupe.

Once the principal demands of the remences was achieved, Verntallat remained for a time at the Court of the Catholic Monarchs until he returned to his castle of Sant Feliu de Pallerols, where he died at the end of the century.
