= 2013 in Catalonia =

- Decades: 1990s; 2000s; 2010s; 2020s
- See also: Other events of 2013; Timeline of Catalan history

Events from 2013 in Catalonia.

== Incumbents ==
- President of the Generalitat of Catalonia – Artur Mas

== Events ==
- 23 January – Declaration on the Sovereignty and Right to Decide of the People of Catalonia approved by the Parliament of Catalonia.
- February – Método 3 affair.
- 29 June – Concert for Freedom, held at Camp Nou stadium in Barcelona on June 29, 2013, organized by Òmnium Cultural, to demand the right of Catalonia democratically decide their future.
- 11 September – Catalan Way, a 400-kilometre human chain in support of Catalan independence from Spain, take place during the National Day of Catalonia.
