= 1932 in Catalonia =

- Decades: 1910s; 1920s; 1930s; 1940s; 1950s
- See also: Other events of 1932; Timeline of Catalan history

Events from 1932 in Catalonia.

== Incumbents ==
- President of the Generalitat of Catalonia – Francesc Macià

== Events ==
- 9 September – The Cortes of the Republic approve the Statute of Autonomy of Catalonia.
- 20 November – First election to the Parliament of Catalonia. The Republican Left of Catalonia win the large majority of seats.
