= 2010 in Catalonia =

- Decades: 1990s; 2000s; 2010s; 2020s
- See also: Other events of 2010; Timeline of Catalan history

Events from 2010 in Catalonia.

== Incumbents ==
- President of the Generalitat of Catalonia – José Montilla (until December 27), Artur Mas (since December 27)

== Events ==
- 29 June – The Constitutional Court in Madrid rules that Catalonia is allowed to call itself a "nation" but without any legal effect, while it declared non valid some of the articles which increased the self-government.
- 10 July – More than a million people hold a march in Barcelona to call for greater autonomy for Catalonia.

== See also ==
- 2010 in Spain
