= 2011 in Catalonia =

- Decades: 1990s; 2000s; 2010s; 2020s
- See also: Other events of 2011; Timeline of Catalan history

Events from 2011 in Catalonia.

== Incumbents ==
- President of the Generalitat of Catalonia – Artur Mas

== Events ==
- 25 September – Bullfighting fans see the last fights before a ban on the age-old tradition comes into effect.

== See also ==
- 2011 in Spain
