= Arsia =

Arsia may signify:

- Arsia (river), in Croatian Istria, now known as Raša
- Arsia Mons, a volcano on Mars
- Silva Arsia, a forest near Republican Rome
- Arsia, one of the evil customs in medieval Catalonia
- Arsia, Latin name of today's Ersa, Haute-Corse, a commune in Corsica
