= Pere Joan Sala =

Spanish revolutionary

- Born: Granollers de Rocacorba
- Died: 1485; Barcelona
- Military career
- Allegiance: peasants
- Rank: informal captain
- Conflicts: Second War of the Remences

Pere Joan Sala (died 1485) was the leader of the radical remensas in the Second War of the Remences, which began with the uprising of Mieres in 1484. Joan Sala was the lieutenant of Francesc de Verntallat, but unlike the latter, Joan Sala was a radical revolutionary who wasn't interested in any treaty with royalty.

The Second War of the Remences was motivated by attempted legal action against the assets of the peasants who refused to pay the manorial fees. Additionally, there was an alignment of interests and support between the remensas during the first War of the Remences and King John II in the Catalan Civil War. They were aligned both in time (1462-1472) and in their adversary: the Generalitat and the nobility. However, at the end of the Catalan civil war, the king pretty much forgot about the remensas.

The Viceroy of Catalonia tried to curb the revolt without success, and the conflict spread throughout the Principality of Catalonia.

In 1485 in Montornès del Vallès, at the head of 400 peasants, Joan Sala defeated the army of the Diputació del General de Catalunya commanded by the Viceroy of Catalonia Pere Anton de Rocacrespa. Later, Joan Sala took the villa of Granollers, from where the revolt spread through Valles, Maresme and the Baix Llobregat. When the threat to Barcelona became clear, the authorities reacted and defeated them in Les Franqueses del Vallès (Llerona) in March 1485. They then took them prisoner and had them executed.

This remensa rebellion succeeded in getting the monarchy, headed by Ferdinand II of Aragon son of John II, involved with the cause of the remensas and after much negotiation Ferdinand announced, on April 21, 1486, the Sentencia Arbitral de Guadalupe. This decree forgave the rank-and-file insurrectionists but had severe consequences for the leaders of the revolt.
