= 1934 in Catalonia =

- Decades: 1910s; 1920s; 1930s; 1940s; 1950s
- See also: Other events of 1934; Timeline of Catalan history

Events from 1934 in Catalonia.

== Incumbents ==
- President of the Generalitat of Catalonia – Lluís Companys (suspended from 7 October)

== Events ==
- 1 January – Lluís Companys is elected and appointed President of the Generalitat.
- 14 January – Catalan local elections.
- 21 March – The Parliament approve the Law of the Court of Appeal of Catalonia.
- 11 April – The Parliament approve the Crop Contracts Law.
- 8 June – The Constitutional Court of Spain annulled the Crop Contract Law.
- 9 June – Creation of the Council of Culture of the Generalitat.
- 12 June – The Parliament approve again the Crop Contract Law as a response to the annullation.
- 6 October – Events of 6 October, where Lluís Companys proclaimed the Catalan State as a response to the accession of the CEDA to the government of the Republic.
- 7 October – the Catalan State is suppressed by the Spanish Army led by general Batet. Catalan Government is arrested and self-government suspended.
- 11 November – Inauguration of the Art Museum of Catalonia.

== Sport ==
- 16 June – Volta a Catalunya begins.
- 24 June – Volta a Catalunya ends, won by Bernardo Rogora.
