= Enrique de Cardona y Enríquez =

Spanish Roman Catholic cardinal and bishop

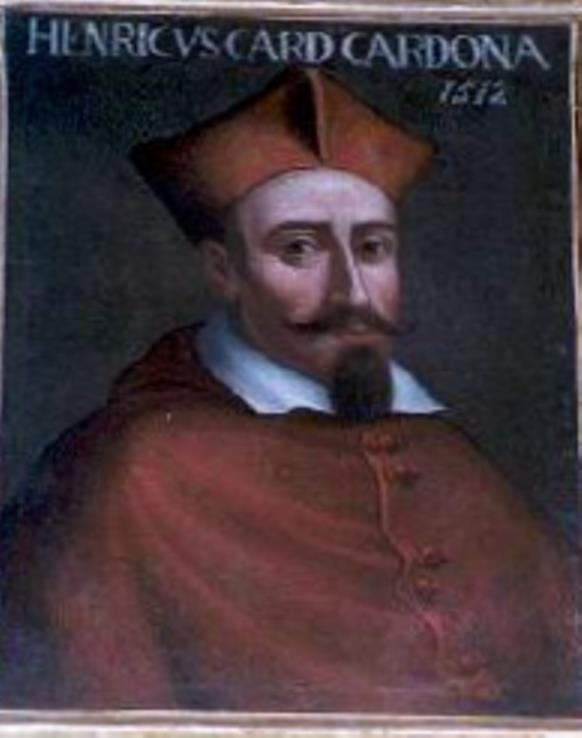
Cardenal Enrique Portrait

Enrique de Cardona y Enríquez (1485–1530) was a Spanish Roman Catholic cardinal and bishop.

== Biography ==
Enrique de Cardona y Enríquez was born in the County of Urgell in 1485, the son of Juan Folch de Cardona y Urgel, Duke of Cardona, and Aldonza Domínguez. He began his career as a cleric in Urgell.

In 1505, Ferdinand II of Aragon wanted to promote him to the see of Barcelona; he therefore forced archdeacon Luís Desplá, who had been elected by the cathedral chapter of Barcelona Cathedral, to retire. The cathedral chapter elected Cardona on 18 April 1505; he received dispensation for not having reached the canonical age of 27. On 23 January 1512 he was promoted to the metropolitan see of Monreale, though he continued to live in Barcelona.

In 1522, he accompanied Pope Adrian VI from Spain to Rome. He was made Prefect of the Castel Sant'Angelo on 24 September 1522. He was a commissary and judge in the case of Cardinal Francesco Soderini, who was arrested on 28 April 1523. He served as president of Sicily in 1526, where he repelled an Ottoman attack on the island, and launched several successful corsairs attack against the Ottoman occupation of the Barbary Coast.

Pope Clement VII made him a cardinal priest in the consistory of 21 November 1527. He received the red hat and the titular church of San Marcello al Corso on 24 November 1527.

He died in Rome on 7 February 1530. He is buried in Santa Maria in Monserrato degli Spagnoli.

== See also ==
- Catholic Church in Spain
