= 2012 in Catalonia =

- Decades: 1990s; 2000s; 2010s; 2020s
- See also: Other events of 2012; Timeline of Catalan history

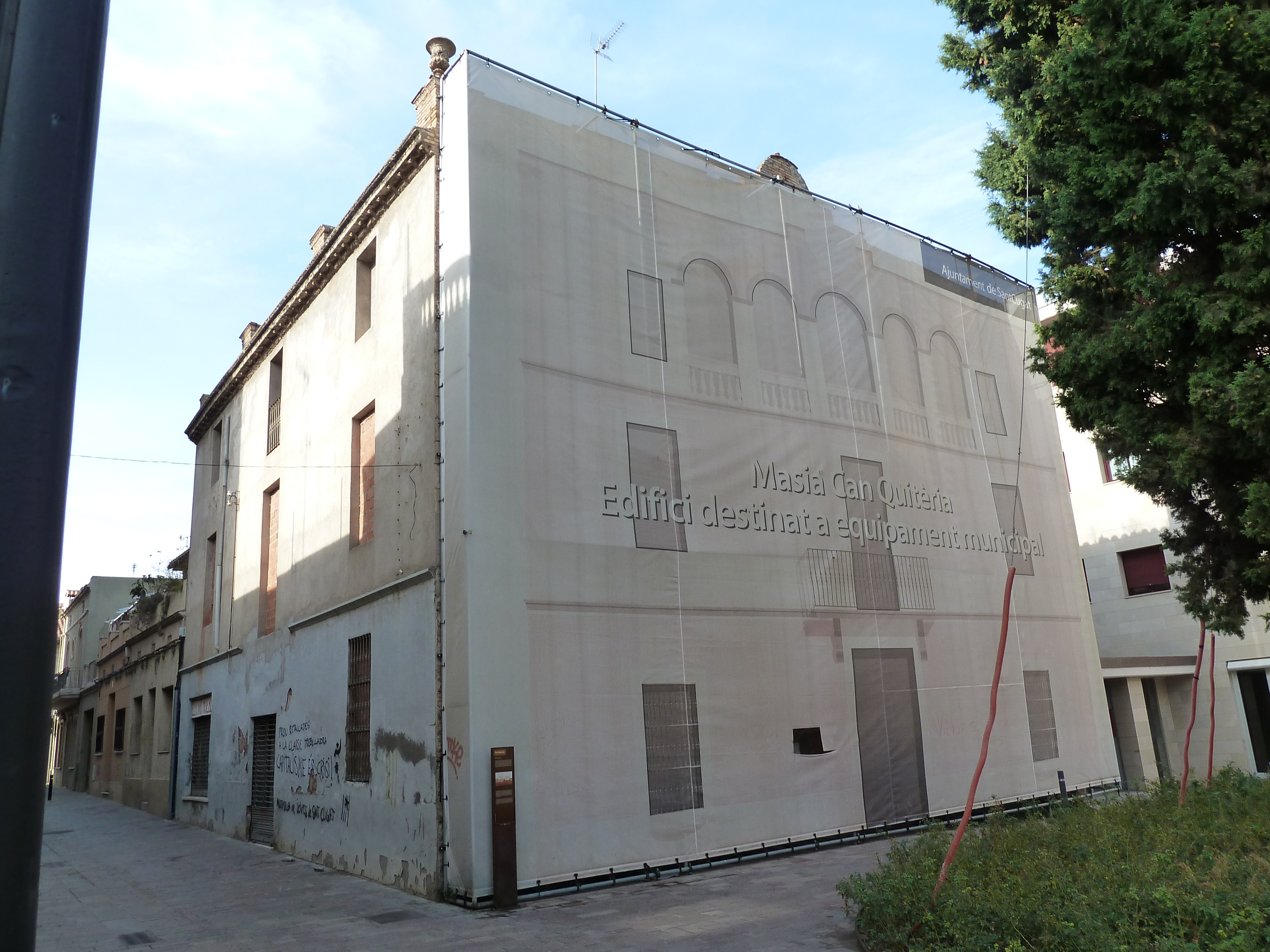
Cal Quitèria, a building in Sant Cugat del Vallès, featured in Wiki Loves Monuments 2012

Events from 2012 in Catalonia.

== Incumbents ==
- President of the Generalitat of Catalonia – Artur Mas

== Events ==
- 11 September – Some 1.5 million people take part in Catalonia's annual independence rally in Barcelona.
- 20 September – The Spanish prime minister rejects a call from Catalonia's leader for fiscal independence, days after a giant pro-autonomy rally in Barcelona.
- 25 September – Artur Mas announces that Catalonia will hold early elections on November 25
- 26 November – Voters of Catalonia return a clear majority of pro-separatist parties to the Catalan Parliament
- 19 December – Artur Mas of the conservative Convergence and Union party and Oriol Junqueras of the Republican Left of Catalonia agree to form a new government and hold a referendum on independence.

== See also ==
- 2012 in Spain
