= 1933 in Catalonia =

- Decades: 1910s; 1920s; 1930s; 1940s; 1950s
- See also: Other events of 1933; Timeline of Catalan history

Events from 1933 in Catalonia.

== Incumbents ==
- President of the Generalitat of Catalonia – Francesc Macià (until 25 December) – Joan Casanovas (acting, from 25 December)

== Events ==
- 25 May – The Parliament approve the Statute of Internal Regime of Catalonia.
- October – Creation of the Republican Left Nationalist Party as a split from ERC, led by Joan Lluhí, critical of the hegemony of Macià.
- 1 June – Establishment of the Autonomous University of Barcelona.
- 19 November – Spanish general election. In Catalonia, the conservative Regionalist League recover the first place, but the left-wing forces resist.
- 25 December – Francesc Macià dies. Joan Casanovas, president of the Parliament, provisionally assumes the position of President of the Generalitat.

== Births ==
- 12 April - Montserrat Caballé, operatic soprano (d. 2018)
