= 1931 in Catalonia =

- Decades: 1910s; 1920s; 1930s; 1940s; 1950s
- See also: Other events of 1931; Timeline of Catalan history

Events from 1931 in Catalonia.

== Incumbents ==
- President of the Generalitat of Catalonia – Francesc Macià (from 14 April)

== Events ==
- 12 April – Local elections in Spain gave the victory in Catalonia to the Republican Left of Catalonia (ERC).
- 14 April – Francesc Macià proclaims the Catalan Republic in Barcelona.
- 17 April – The Catalan Republic becomes in the Generalitat of Catalonia presided by Macià himself, as an autonomous government within the new Spanish Republic.
- 26 April – 29th IOC Session held in Barcelona, electing Berlin as the host city of 1936 Summer Olympic Games.
- 23 June – El Be Negre, Catalan illustrated satirical weekly magazine, founded.
- 2 August – Catalan voters approve the draft of Statute of Autonomy for Catalonia redacted in Núria (Ripollès, Girona).

== Sport ==
- 6 September – Volta a Catalunya begins.
- 13 September – Volta a Catalunya ends, won by Salvador Cardona.
