= 1919 in Catalonia =

- Decades: 1890s; 1900s; 1910s; 1920s; 1930s
- See also: Other events of 1919; Timeline of Catalan history

Events from 1919 in Catalonia.

== Incumbents ==
- President of the Commonwealth of Catalonia – Josep Puig i Cadafalch

== Events ==
- 24 January – the Assembly of the Commonwealth of Catalonia approve the project of Statute of Autonomy of Catalonia, later repealed by the Spanish Cortes in Madrid.
- 5 February – 16 March – La Canadiense strike paralyze the industry in Barcelona, achieving the first law limiting the working day to eight hours.
