= Hugh Roger III of Pallars Sobirà =

Military leader of Catalan Civil war

Hugh Roger III de Pallars Sobirà (around 1430 – 26 November 1508) was a military leader during the Catalan Civil War and the last Count of Pallars Sobirà from 1451 to 1487 and by marriage, Baron de Ponts from 1478 to 1487.

== Biography ==
He was the only son of Arnau Roger IV de Pallars Sobirà and Joana de Cardona i de Prades. He was a nephew of Joan Ramon Folc III, Count of Cardona. He married Caterina, daughter of the Roussillon noble Philip d'Albert and had no legitimate children.

In 1461 he was part of the Catalan delegation that demanded from King John II of Aragon the freedom of Charles, Prince of Viana. He was also a member of the Council of the Principality, where he was in conflict with his uncle Joan Ramon Folc III, Count of Cardona and Count of Prades.

After the outbreak of the Catalan Civil War in 1462, he became supreme military leader of the Principality of Catalonia against King John II of Aragon. He fought against the Royalist Remensa, besieged Queen Juana Enríquez and Infante Ferran in the Força Vella ("old fort") of Girona and defended Barcelona. He was deputy of the Generalitat de Catalunya in 1464–67. He fell prisoner to John II in 1466, but was released in 1470 after paying a large ransom and promising to support the cause of John II. Nevertheless, he continued fighting as Captain General of the Principality until the defeat and capitulation of Pedralbes, from which he was the only person to be excluded (1472).

After the war, he maintained a campaign of continuous hostilies by Pallars and the neighboring lands from his refuge in Valencia d'Àneu with the support of King Louis XI of France. In 1475 he accepted a truce, and in 1480 he made an act of submission and obtained forgiveness for himself and his supporters, but in 1484 he took up his armed resistance again.

Cornered by his relatives and enemies, the Counts of Cardona, he had to flee in 1488, while his wife continued to resist heroically in Valencia d'Àneu, where she was besieged for three years. In 1491, all their domains passed to the Cardona's, under the name of Marquisate of Pallars.

Exiled in France, he entered the service of Charles VIII of France, and accompanied him to Naples in 1494. He was governor of Castel Nuovo in Naples, and fell prisoner to Gonzalo Fernández de Córdoba, the Grand Captain in 1503. After being imprisoned in this fortress, he was taken to Barcelona, and having been sentenced to life imprisonment, he was transferred to the castle of Xàtiva, where he died in 1508.
