= Fernando Ramon Folch, 2nd Duke of Cardona =

Spanish noble

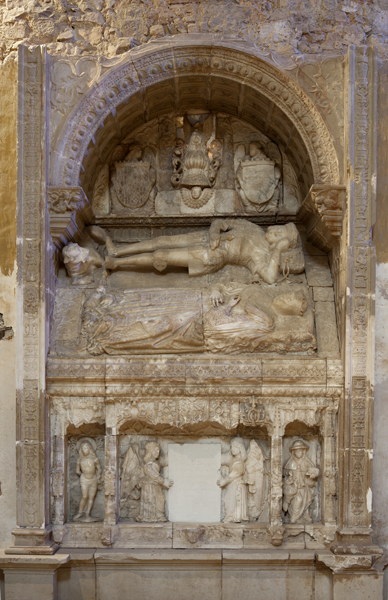
Sarcophagus of Fernando in the collegiate church of Sant Vincenç in Cardona

Fernando Ramon Folch De Cardona, 2nd Duke of Cardona, (circa 1470 – Barcelona, 13 November 1543), was a Spanish noble. He became 2nd Duke of Cardona in 1513 and was also Viceroy of Sicily.

Fernando's father Juan Ramón Folch IV de Cardona (1446–1513) was awarded the title Duke of Cardona in 1491 by King Ferdinand II of Aragón. Fernando's grandfather was Juan Ramon Folch de Cardona, 3rd count of Cardona, a.k.a. Juan Ramon Folch III, 3rd count of Cardona, 6th count of Prades, 3rd count of Cardona and Viceroy of Sicily (1477–1479).

Fernand was also 2nd Marquis of Pallars, 7th Count of Prades, Viscount of Villamur, Baron of Entenza, Great Constable and Admiral of Aragon as well as a Knight of the Order of the Golden Fleece invested in 1519 by King Charles I of Spain. He was also made Grandee of Spain in 1520.

== Family and children ==
He was married on 17 February 1498, at Epila, Zaragoza, Spain, to Francisca Manrique de Lara (deceased at Arbeca, prov. of Lerida on 21 August 1529), daughter of Pedro Manrique I de Lara, 1st Duke of Nájera and the Portuguese Guiomar de Castro y Acuña. Francisca was the sister of Antonio Manrique de Lara, 2nd duke of Nájera.

Don Fernando and Doña Francisca had no sons, but four daughters of whom the eldest, Juana Folch De Cardona y Manrique de Lara (Juana I, born circa 1490), inherited her father's titles, including the honour of Grandee of Spain, on her father's death in November 1543.

== Genealogical notes ==
=== Juana I Folch de Cardona ===
Juana I had been married in Segorbe, 1516, to Alfonso de Aragon, 2nd duke of Segorbe, (1489–1563), a.k.a. Alfonso de Aragon y Portugal. The couple had 13 children (he had at least one more), of which only one son, Francisco, later Francisco de Aragón, 3rd duke of Segorbe, a.k.a. Francisco de Aragon y Folch de Cardona and 4th duke of Cardona, as well as four daughters, used their family names as "Aragon y Folch de Cardona".

=== Juana II Folch de Cardona ===
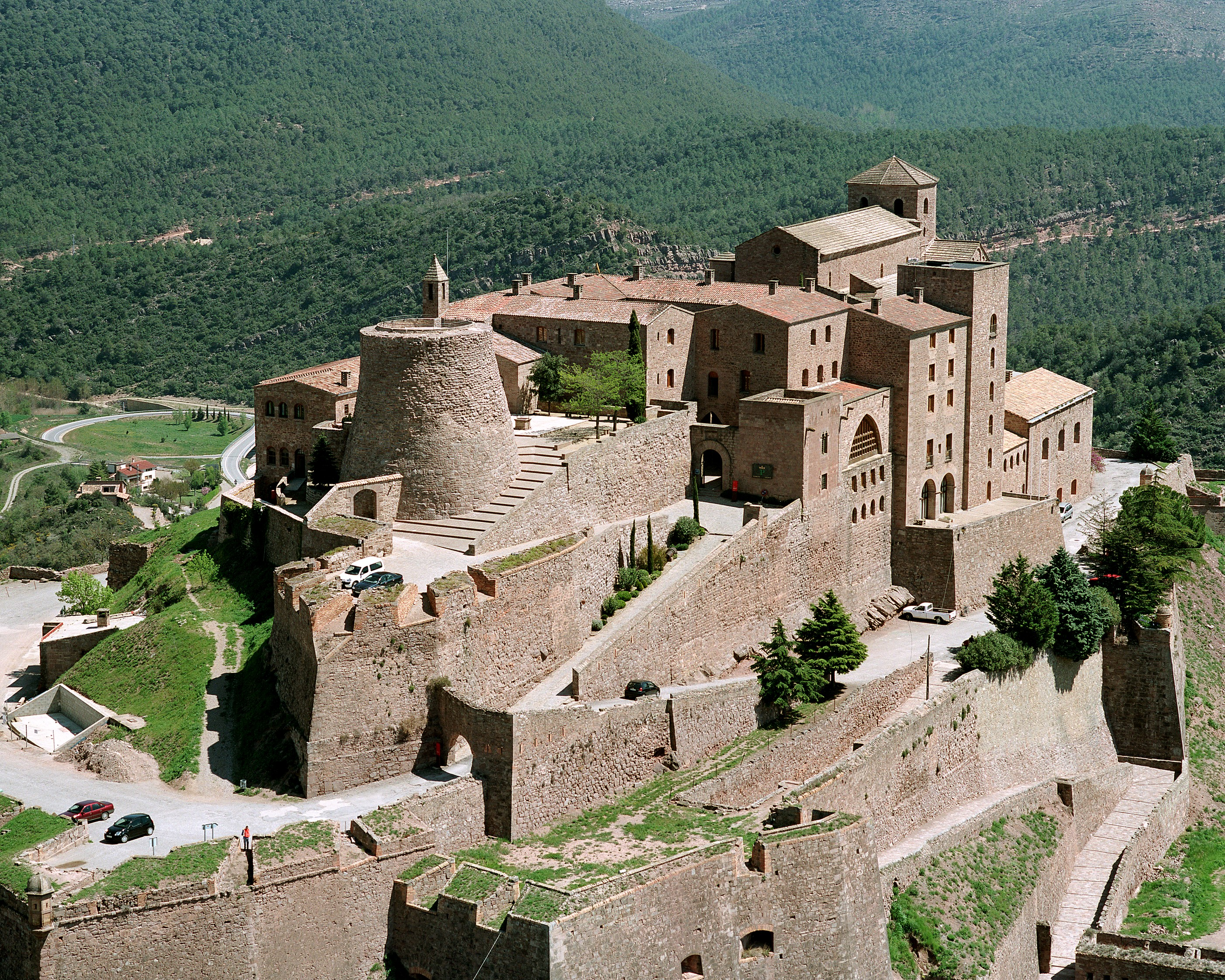
The Catalan castle of Cardona one of the fiefs of the 11th century "Cardona" or "Folch de Cardona" family, barons, viscounts, counts since 1375, dukes since 1482, today.

The eldest daughter was called Juana like her mother; as a token of remembrance of the Cardona family, she used the inherited ruling title Juana Folch de Cardona, 4th duchess of Cardona, but without the customary "Aragon" used by her father, the 2nd duke of Segorbe, her brother, Francisco, the 3rd duke of Segorbe, and by her sisters.

Eventually, Juana II, sometimes described as 5th duchess, counting her brother named as Folch de Aragon but not Folch de Cardona, however, was the successor of Juana I, 3rd duchess of Cardona. She would marry Diego Fernandez de Cordoba, 3 marquis of Comares, a Knight of the Order of the Golden Fleece, a.k.a. "El Africano" because of his long residential times in surrounding Muslim areas in North Africa, strongholds of Imperial Spain. Born in Oran, now in Algeria, in 1524, he died in his lands of Arbeca, Lerida, Catalonia, in 1601.

Their son, Luis Ramon, died in 1596 before his mother Juana II, now 4th duchess of Cardona. Therefore, Juana's grandson Enrique de Aragón Folc de Cardona y Córdoba, born 1588 in Andalusia and deceased December 1640 in Perpignan, France) became the 5th Duke of Cardona in 1608.

Some of Luis Ramon's brothers and sisters used the family name "Aragon" deriving from their Segorbe dukes ancestry; such did eldest daughter Juana de Córdoba Cardona y Aragón; while the "Fernandez De Cordoba" name was used by others as well. This is a fact probably alien to the European nobility but it was not very uncommon for the great Spanish nobility families of the Empire for several hundred years.

Thus, the study of notorious old family pressure groups and rather elusive "power lobbies" could be very complicated and erroneous or at least misleading to process, without today's computer info retrievals, indeed, at least in the Spanish case. For example Antonio Fernández de Córdoba y Cardona who married Juana de Córdoba Cardona y Aragón, was NOT immediate family.

== Arms ==
Coat of Arms of the family Cardona

Coat of Arms of the family Cardona, Barons, Viscounts, Counts, (since 1375), and Dukes, (since 1491), successively, since their beginnings around the 11th century, from the kingdom of Aragon - Catalonia. Their titles, several times linked with royal connections, were passed through male or female inheritors. Súria and Cardona, in Catalonia have provided for over 1000 years potassium salts for dried meat keeping and gunpowder manufacturing. A "Cardo" in Spanish is a "Thistle" plant for the Scots, hence, their coat of arms.

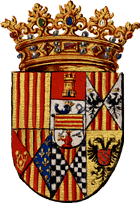
The ducal coat of arms of the Segorbe dukes

The ducal coat of arms of the Segorbe dukes, a group of the "Aragon" family names, grafted to the "Folch de Cardona" family, who had their own much simpler ducal coat of arms, married since 1516, but keeping both family names depending on circumstances, group of influence, administrated lands, etc. Since the middle of the 16th century a line of the "Fernandez de Cordoba" families was grafted, too. The uses of the family names, "Aragon", "Folch de Cardona" and "Fernandez de Cordoba" could depend on personal circumstances, wealth and lands, etc. By the beginnings of the 18th century, they became intertwined with the dukes of Medinaceli who started to use "Fernandez de Cordoba", as the original "de la Cerda" ducal family ended their complicated family saga becoming political prisoners of the new Bourbon Royal Family, dying while in prison at Pamplona, Spain, in 1711. The actual duchess, holding a surprising number of all kinds of titles, several of them dukedoms, is a "Fernandez de Cordoba".

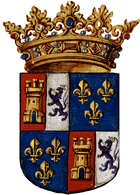
The dukes of Medinaceli coat of arms

The dukedoms of Segorbe and Cardona consolidated together by marriages in 1516. By the second half of the 16th century, the 4th ruling duke, duchess Juana II Folch de Cardona, deceased 1608 had married the Andalusian 3rd marquis of Comares, a title of lesser rank, a "Fernandez de Cordoba", named "El Africano", because he was born in 1523, and lived for very long times in the Spanish naval strongholds in Algeria and Morocco, North Africa. At the beginnings of the 18th century the last "La Cerda" dukes of Medinaceli, descending from first rate medieval Castilian royalty through a woman who had married nevertheless a bastard of the French Counts of Foix towards the ends of the 14th century died in prison at Pamplona, Spain, in 1711, of the new Spanish Bourbon royal dynasty. Co-lateral "Fernandez de Cordoba" relatives received all these reunited dukedoms. The actual "ruling" duchess, head of all these ducal houses and many other interconnected titles, is a "Fernandez de Cordoba", too.
