= War of the Remences =

Two 15th century peasant revolts in Catalonia

The Rebellion of the Remences or War of the Remences was a popular revolt in late medieval Europe against seignorial pressures that began in the Principality of Catalonia in 1462 and ended a decade later without definitive result. Ferdinand II of Aragon finally resolved the conflict with the Sentencia Arbitral de Guadalupe in 1486.

The Catalan term remença derives from the Latin redementia and emphasizes the possibility of redemption from servitude.

In the early 14th century, the rise of Catalan cities and the expansion of Catalan culture and the Aragonese Empire led to a decline in the rural population, which declined still further due to the Black Death. The nobility began to strictly enforce the evil customs tying peasants to the land; they also began a much stricter enforcement of seignorial rights in general than had been the practice in recent centuries.

The strongest support for open rebellion came from the poorest peasants. Those with more goods—who were in the majority on the Plain of Vic, l'Empordà, and el Vallès—tried to appeal to the king for reforms and the end of the seignorial abuses. The monarchy had some reasons to wish to have the peasants as an independent force, since the Aragonese crown was continually in a power struggle with the nobility.

In the mid-15th century, Alfonso V of Aragon, "the Magnanimous", allowed the peasants to form a sindicat remença, a peasants' guild or primitive trade union, granted them their liberty and intervened in several other ways against the abuses. However, the Bishop of Girona sided with the nobility; along with the Generalitat, controlled by the nobles, their opposition led Alfonso to reverse himself.

Alfonso's successor, John II, sought the peasants' help against the nobility. By May 1461, the peasantry had declared themselves in favor of the king against the nobles.

== First War of the Remences ==
In 1462, the remensa peasants rebelled; this coincided with the War against John II by the nobles. The peasants, under the leadership of Francesc de Verntallat, fought mainly in the mountainous interior, while the king and the more traditional armed forces loyal to him fought nearer the Mediterranean coast. After ten years, John won the war, but failed to abolish serfdom or even to bring about significant reforms.

== Second War of the Remences ==
In 1484, a second rebellion broke out, under the leadership of Pere Joan Sala, the former captain of Francesc de Verntallat. It began with the Mieres Uprising, which took place in the Valley of Mieres on September 22, 1484.

Following that, Joan Sala was able to extend his power not only in the Muntanya Comarca, but also in the Plain of Vic, Selva, Garrotxa, and Gironès. He wasn't as successful in Empordà, where the peasants didn't follow him into revolt, nor on December 14 when he tried to take Girona. However, Lieutenant Infante Enric, who wanted to organize an attack against Joan Sala, had to retreat in the face of the size of his amassed forces.

In the face of this rebellion, King Ferdinand II, "the Catholic" issued the Sentencia de Guadalupe (1486), outlawing the more severe abuses and allowing remensa peasants to be redeemed by a payment of 60 sous per household, leaving a rural society that was still feudal in character, but significantly reformed.

== See also ==
- History of Catalonia
- Catalan Civil War
- Spain in the Middle Ages

== Bibliography ==
- Alcalá, César (2010). Les Guerres Remences. Barcelona: Editorial UOC. ISBN 978-84-9788-926-1.
