= Duke of Cardona =

Dukedom of Spain

Dukedom of Cardona
- Creation date: 1482
- Created by: Ferdinand II
- Peerage: Peerage of Spain
- First holder: Juan Ramón Folch de Cardona y Urgel, 1st Duke of Cardona
- Present holder: Casilda Ghisla Guerrero-Burgos y Fernández de Córdoba, 21st Duchess of Cardona

Duke of Cardona (Spanish: Duque de Cardona) is a hereditary title in the Peerage of Spain, accompanied by the dignity of Grandee. The title was granted in 1491 by Ferdinand II to Juan Ramón Folch de Cardona, 5th Count of Cardona, as an elevation to dukedom.

It was originally granted as Viscount of Cardona (1040-1375) and later elevated to Count of Cardona (1375-1491), as a noble title in the 15th century to members of an old and important Catalan aristocratic family, the House of Folch-Cardona.

== Counts of Cardona ==
	Holder	Period
I	Hug II de Cardona	1375–1400
II	Joan Ramón Folc I de Cardona	1400–1441
III	Joan Ramon Folc II de Cardona	1441–1471
IV	Joan Ramon Folc III de Cardona	1471–1486
V	Joan Ramon Folc IV de Cardona	1486–1491

== Dukes of Cardona ==
	Holder	Period
Created by Fernando II of Aragon
I	Juan Ramón Folch IV de Cardona	1491–1513
II	Fernando Folch de Cardona y Enríquez	1513–1543
III	Juana Folch de Cardona y Manrique de Lara	1543–1564
IV	Francisco de Aragón y Cardona	1564–1575
V	Juana de Aragón y Cardona	1575–1608
VI	Enrique de Aragón y Enríquez de Cabrera	1608–1640
VII	Luis de Aragón y Fernández de Córdoba	1640–1670
VIII	Joaquín de Aragón y Benavides	1670–1670
IX	Pedro de Aragón Folc de Cardona	disputed
X	Catalina de Aragón y Sandoval	1670–1697
XI	Luis Francisco de la Cerda y Aragón	1697–1711
XII	Nicolás Fernández de Córdoba y de la Cerda	1711–1739
XIII	Luis Fernández de Córdoba y Spínola	1739–1768
XIV	Pedro de Alcántara Fernández de Córdoba y Moncada	1768–1789
XV	Luis Fernández de Córdoba y Gonzaga	1789–1806
XVI	Luis Fernández de Córdoba y Benavides	1806–1840
XVII	Luis Fernández de Córdoba y Ponce de León	1840–1873
XVIII	Luis Fernández de Córdoba y Pérez de Barradas	1873–1879
XIX	Luis Fernández de Córdoba y Salabert	1880–1949
XX	Casilda Fernández de Córdoba y Pablo-Blanco	1950–1998
XXI	Casilda Guerrero-Burgos y Fernández de Córdoba	1998–present

== See also ==
- List of dukes in the peerage of Spain
- List of current grandees of Spain
