= Sentencia Arbitral de Guadalupe =

1486 Spanish legal decree

- Signed: 21 April 1486
- Location: Extremadura, Spain
- Negotiators: King Ferdinand II of Aragon
- Original signatories: King Ferdinand II of Aragon; Francesc de Verntallat

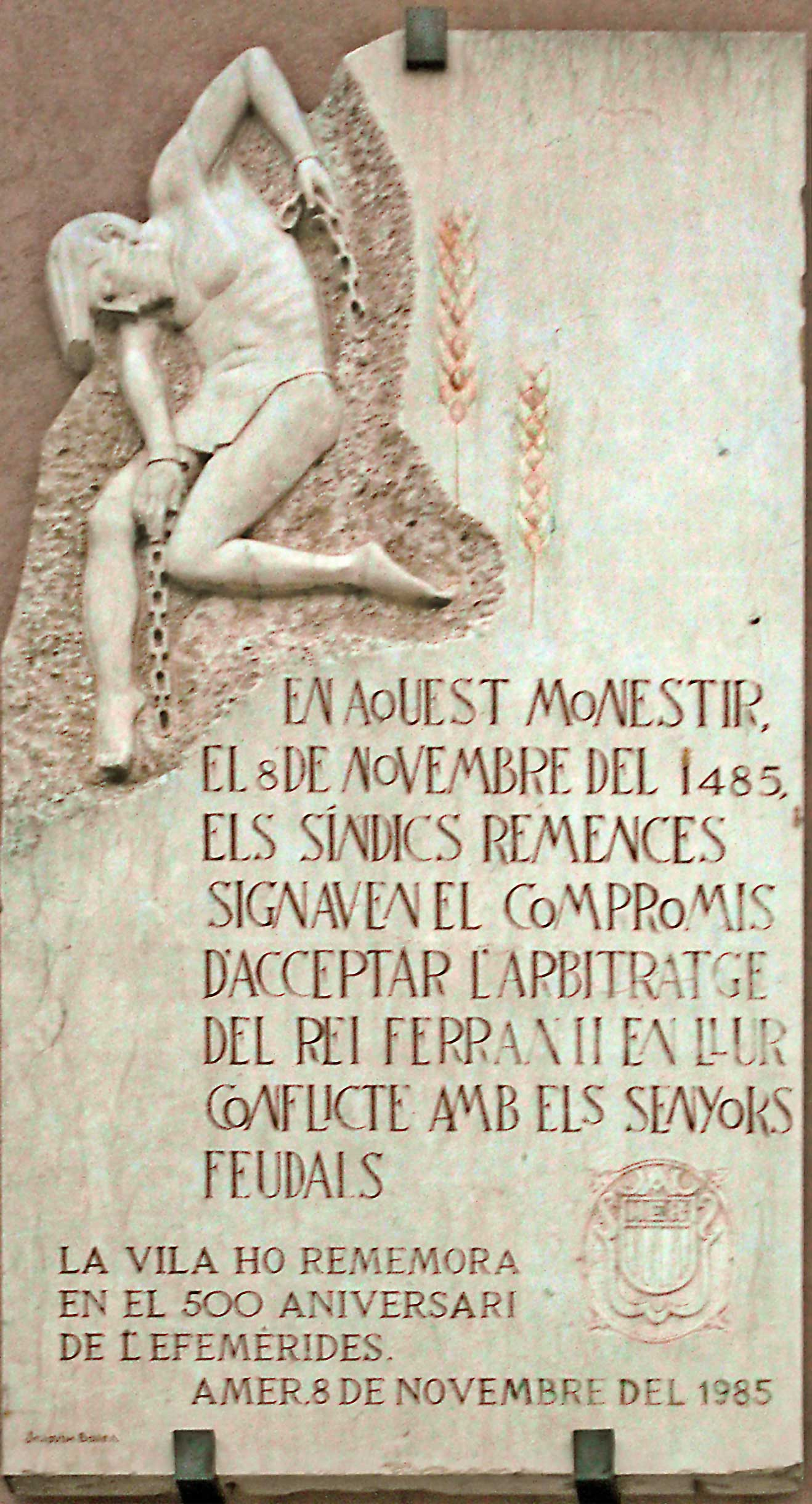
500th anniversary of the royal remensa treaty signed at Santa Maria, Amer

The Sentencia Arbitral de Guadalupe (from Spanish: Arbitral Decision of Guadalupe) was a legal decree delivered by King Ferdinand II of Aragon at the Monastery of Santa María de Guadalupe in Extremadura, Spain on 21 April 1486 to free the Catalan remensa peasants who were subjects of the lord of the manor and tied to his lands and subject to numerous onerous fees and maltreatment under the so-called evil customs (mals usos).

== Objective ==
The objective of the decree was to solve the conflicts between the remensa peasants and their lords, conflicts that had motivated the two wars of the Remences. Negotiations for drafting the decree were very difficult. The king himself became directly involved and was an effective negotiator, at least in the economic sphere. Finally, King Ferdinand dictated the Sentencia Arbitral that allowed the end of the evil customs in exchange for a payment (not only for the "mal ús" remença), and postponed the conflict that had lasted more than four centuries between lords and peasants.

In exchange for a payment of 60 sous per farmstead, the right to mistreat peasants and many other minor statutory abuses were abolished. Peasants retained the usufruct of the farm, but had to pay homage to the lord and pay emphyteutic and feudal fees, albeit with irrational amounts, more to mark who was really in charge than for economic benefit. The upshot was that the abolition of the feudal system for which the peasants were fighting, was converted only into the possibility of freeing themselves from the evil customs, or "malae consuetudines", as people called it at that time.

Signing on behalf of the peasants was Francesc de Verntallat along with 18 syndicates, including Llorenç Espígol of Sant Feliu de Pallerols.

== Repression ==
Even so, there was still repression: peasants were obliged to return all the castles that they had won from the lords, and pay 6,000 pounds compensation to the lords. While it is true that King Ferdinand freed some detainees, he also confiscated property or sterilized the land of others, or executed them.

The decree meant the beginning of a new phase in the Principality of Catalonia: the right to freely contract emphyteutic agreements, which led to general prosperity in the Catalonian countryside. By the 15th century, Catalan peasants already had a level of personal freedom that the rest of the Iberian Peninsula and Europe was not to know before the 18th or 19th century.

== See also ==
- War of the Remences
- Catalan Civil War
