= Timeline of Catalan history =

This is a timeline of Catalan history, comprising important legal and territorial changes and political events in Catalonia and its predecessor states and polities. To read about the background to these events, see History of Catalonia.

== 8th century ==
| Year | Date | Event |
|---|---|---|
| 760 | | Perpignan conquered by the Franks from Muslim control. Establishment of the County of Roussillon. |
| 785 | | Girona conquered by the Franks from Muslim control. Establishment of the County of Girona. |

== 9th century ==
| Year | Date | Event |
|---|---|---|
| 801 | | Barcelona conquered by the Franks from Muslim control. Establishment of the County of Barcelona. |
| 826 | | Aissó Revolt against Frankish nobility, devastating and depopulating most of Central Catalonia. |
| 878 | | Wilfred the Hairy, count of Urgell and Cerdanya becomes count of Barcelona, Girona and Osona. |
| 880 | | Monastery of Santa Maria de Ripoll founded. |
| 897 | | Muslim raid over the County of Barcelona. Count Wilfred dies, creating the tradition of hereditary passage of their titles, founding the House of Barcelona. |

== 10th century ==
| Year | Date | Event |
|---|---|---|
| 942 | | Hungarian raid. |
| 985 | 6 July | Cordoba's ruler Almanzor sacks Barcelona. |
| 988 | | Borrell II, Count of Barcelona doesn't renew the allegiance to the French king Hugh Capet; thus ensuring the independence of the counties from Frankish monarchy. |

== 11th century ==
| Year | Date | Event |
|---|---|---|
| 1018 | | Countess Ermesinde of Carcassonne became regent of Barcelona, Girona and Osona after the death of her husband, the count Ramon Borrell. |
| 1027 | | First Assembly of Peace and Truce of God of Catalonia, in Toulouges (Roussillon), promoted and presided by Abbot Oliba. |
| 1035 | | Mir Geribert led the nobility of the Penedès against the authority of the count, representing the height of the feudal revolution in Catalonia. |
| 1035 | | Ramon Berenguer I, grandson of Ermesinde, became Count of Barcelona, he begins a process of negotiation with the nobility in order to recover the authority over them, respecting the resulting new feudal order. |

== 12th century ==
| Year | Date | Event |
|---|---|---|
| 1111 | | Ramon Berenguer III, Count of Barcelona, inherited the County of Besalú. |
| 1117 | | The first reference to Catalonia and the Catalans appeared in the Liber maiolichinus de gestis Pisanorum illustribus, a Pisan chronicle of the conquest of Majorca by a joint force of Italians, Catalans, and Occitans. |
| 1118 | | Archdiocese of Tarragona reestablished, the Catalan Church gains independence from the Archdiocese of Narbonne, in France. |
| 1137 | | Ramon Berenguer IV, Count of Barcelona receives from Ramiro II the Kingdom of Aragon and his daughter, Petronilla, resulting in the dynastic union later known as the Crown of Aragon. |
| 1148 | | Conquest of Tortosa from Muslim rule. |
| 1149 | | Conquest of Lleida from Muslim rule. |
| 1150 | August | Ramon Berenguer IV marries Petronilla in Lleida. |
| 1162 | 6 August | Ramon Berenguer IV dies. He is succeeded by his son, Alfonso II of Aragon and I of Barcelona. |
| 1173 | | First documentary reference of the Usages of Barcelona, the first compilation of feudal legislation and the basis of Catalan law. First legal delimitation of Catalonia. |
| 1192 | | First Assembly of Peace and Truce of God which includes representatives of the non-privileged estate, making it a precedent of the Catalan Courts. |

== 13th century ==
| Year | Date | Event |
|---|---|---|
| 1213 | 12 September | Battle of Muret, defeat of Catalan, Aragonese and Occitan forces led by Peter II of Aragon, which dies in the battle, against the French-Crusade army led by Simon de Montfort. |
| 1214 | | Royal Court convened in Lleida by cardinal Peter of Benevento in order to fix the confusing situation after the death of King Peter II and secure the succession of his heir James I. |
| 1229 | 5 September | Conquest of Majorca: James I the Conqueror led a fleet of some two hundred vessels and twenty thousand men from Salou, Cambrils and Tarragona to Majorca. |
| 1249 | | Consell de Cent of Barcelona established. |
| 1251 | | The Catalan Courts establish the supremacy of the Usages of Barcelona throughout the whole of Catalonia. |
| 1258 | 11 May | Treaty of Corbeil between James I and Louis IX of France. The French king renounced claims of feudal overlordship over Catalonia while James renounced his claims in Occitania, except Foix. |
| 1258 | | James I grants the Carta Consular, the legal basis of the Consulate of the Sea, to the city of Barcelona. |
| 1276 | 27 July | James the Conqueror dies. He is succeeded as king of Aragon, Valencia and count of Barcelona by his son, Peter the Great, and as king of Majorca by another son, James II of Majorca. |
| 1283 | | First regulated Catalan Courts, presided by Peter III. First Constitutions of Catalonia. |
| 1285 | 4 September | Aragonese Crusade: A Sicilian-Catalan fleet decisively defeats the French and Genoans at the naval Battle of Les Formigues, northeastern coast of Catalonia. |
| 1285 | 30 September | Aragonese Crusade: Battle of the Col de Panissars (Catalan Pyrenees), decisive victory of the king Peter III of Aragon over French forces. |
| 1300 | | University of Lleida, the first university of Catalonia and the Crown of Aragon, founded. |

== 14th century ==
| Year | Date | Event |
|---|---|---|
| 1311 | | The Catalan Company conquers the duchies of Athens and Neopatras, in Greece. |
| 1318 | | Establishment of the Royal Archives of Barcelona. |
| 1329 | 25 March | Santa Maria del Mar church construction begins. |
| 1333 | | Lo mal any primer ("The first bad year"), great famine due to poor harvest. |
| 1343 | | The counties of Roussillon and Cerdanya, previously owned by the Kingdom of Majorca, were reincorporated in to the Principality of Catalonia. First documented use of the term "Principality of Catalonia". |
| 1348 | | Black Death in Barcelona. |
| 1349 | | University of Perpignan founded. |
| 1350 | | Catalan Courts of Perpignan. |
| 1358 | | First Fogatge (hearth tax) carried out in Catalonia. |
| 1359 | 19 December | The Catalan Courts of 1359 established the Deputation of the General (Generalitat of Catalonia). |
| 1365 | 22 July | Privilege of Sant Feliu de Guíxols: Peter IV of Aragon grants to inhabitants of the Kingdom of Majorca the condition of Catalans and the right to be represented in the Catalan Courts, politically vinculating Majorca with the Principality of Catalonia. |
| 1375 | | Catalan Atlas. |

== 15th century ==
| Year | Date | Event |
|---|---|---|
| 1401 | | Taula de canvi, first public bank of Europe, founded in Barcelona. |
| 1410 | 31 May | Martin I, last king of the House of Barcelona, dies without heirs. Beginning of two-year interregnum. |
| 1412 | | Compromise of Caspe, representatives of Catalonia, Aragon and Valencia elected Ferdinand of the Castilian House of Trastámara as the new King of Aragon. |
| 1413 | | Defeat of count James II of Urgell, claimant of the throne of Aragon, at the siege of Balaguer. |
| 1428 | 2 February | Earthquake with an epicentre in Northern Catalonia. |
| 1450 | | University of Barcelona founded. |
| 1455 | | Dispute between the Biga and Busca, political factions of Barcelona, begins. |
| 1460 | 8 December | The Generalitat establishes the Council of the Principality. |
| 1461 | 21 June | Capitulation of Vilafranca between John II and the Generalitat. |
| 1462 | | Outbreak of the Catalan Civil War. |
| 1462 | | Outbreak of the First War of the Remences. |
| 1472 | 24 October | Capitulation of Pedralbes, end of the Civil War with negotiated victory of the royal side. |
| 1481 | | The Constitució de l'Observança passed by the Catalan Courts, establishing the submission of royal power to the laws of the Principality Catalonia. |
| 1484 | | Outbreak of the Second War of the Remences, led by the radical remença peasant Pere Joan Sala. |
| 1486 | 21 April | Sentencia Arbitral de Guadalupe: the remença peasants are freed from most of feudal abuses. |
| 1492 | 31 March | Alhambra Decree issued by the Catholic Monarchs, expelling non-converted Jews from their realms. |
| 1493 | April | Christopher Columbus is received in the monastery of Sant Jeroni de la Murtra (Badalona) by the Catholic Monarchs after his first voyage to America. |
| 1493 | | Ferdinand II establishes a separate Royal Audience of Catalonia, the supreme court and seat of the government of the Principality. |

== 16th century ==
| Year | Date | Event |
|---|---|---|
| 1519 | | Charles V presides the Catalan Courts and is appointed Count of Barcelona. |
| 1529 | 29 June | Treaty of Barcelona between Charles V and Pope Clement VII. |
| 1587 | | The Generalitat commissions to painter Filippo Ariosto the Gallery of portraits of the Counts of Barcelona, one of the oldest and largest royal galleries of Europe. |

== 17th century ==
| Year | Date | Event |
|---|---|---|
| 1626 | | The Catalan Courts, presided by Philip IV, rejected the proposal of Union of Arms made by the royal favourite and minister Count-Duke of Olivares. |
| 1640 | 6 January | The border fortress of Salses recovered to the French by the Spanish armies with large assistance of Catalan militia. |
| 1640 | 7 June | Corpus de Sang in Barcelona, one of the initial events of the Reapers' War. Dalmau de Queralt, viceroy of Catalonia, assassinated during the event. |
| 1640 | 7 September | Pact of Ceret between Catalonia and France. |
| 1640 | 10 September | Junta de Braços or States-General (assembly of Estates) of the Principality of Catalonia summoned, it begin to assume the sovereignty. |
| 1640 | 16 December | On its way to Barcelona, the Spanish armies perpetrate the Cambrils massacre. |
| 1641 | 16 January | The Junta de Braços, presided over by Pau Claris, President of the Generalitat, accepted the establishment of an independent Catalan Republic under French proteccion. |
| 1641 | 23 January | In order to ensure military aid from France, the Junta de Braços proclaimed Louis XIII as Count of Barcelona. |
| 1641 | 26 January | Battle of Montjuïc, decisive Franco-Catalan victory over the Spanish armies. |
| 1641 | 30 December | Louis XIII swears the Catalan constitutions. |
| 1644 | | Spanish armies capture Lleida. Philip IV commits himself to respect the Catalan constitutions. |
| 1652 | | Fall of Barcelona to the Spanish Royal army. The Principality is reincorporated into the Monarchy of Spain. |
| 1659 | | Treaty of the Pyrenees between Spain and France, the counties of Roussillon and the northern half of Cerdanya were ceded to France. |
| 1687 | | Revolt of the Barretines. |
| 1697 | 10 August | French armies occupies Barcelona during the Nine Years' War. |

== 18th century ==
| Year | Date | Event |
|---|---|---|
| 1701 | | Catalan Courts presided by Philip V of Bourbon, recognizing Philip as Count of Barcelona and establishing the Court of Contraventions. |
| 1705 | 20 June | Pact of Genoa between England and Catalonia. |
| 1705 | 9 October | Grand Alliance armies took Barcelona. |
| 1705 | 5 December | Last Catalan Courts, presided by Charles III of Habsburg, they recognized Charles as Count of Barcelona and represented an important progress in the guarantee of individual, civil and political rights. |
| 1713 | 9 July | War of the Catalans: the Junta de Braços of Catalonia votes to remain on the fight against Philip V. Army of Catalonia and Catalan navy raised. |
| 1713 | 25 July | Siege of Barcelona begins. |
| 1713 | 9 August | Expedition of the military deputy: Catalan army disembarked in Arenys de Mar, in order to weaken the siege of Barcelona and provoke a general rebellion against the Bourbons in the countryside. |
| 1714 | 13 August | Battle of Talamanca, last pro-Habsburg major victory in Catalonia. |
| 1714 | 11 September | Fall of Barcelona to Bourbon armies, after thirteen months of siege. |
| 1716 | 16 January | Nueva Planta Decrees: the Principality of Catalonia lost its institutions and public law, being politically incorporated as a province of the Crown of Castille, as the new Kingdom of Spain. |
| 1717 | | Philip V decrees the abolition of all universities of Catalonia and the foundation of the University of Cervera. |
| 1719 | | War of the Quadruple Alliance: Pro-Habsburg uprising, led by Pere Joan Barceló Carrasclet |
| 1721 | | Mossos d'Esquadra founded. |
| 1725 | | Citadel of Barcelona inaugurated. |
| 1758 | | Royal Barcelona Board of Trade founded. |
| 1773 | | Revolt of the Quintas against the imposition of Castilian-style forced recruitment. |
| 1778 | | Charles III of Spain decrees the end of Cádiz's trade monopoly with American colonies. |
| 1789 | 28 February | Rebombori del Pa. |

== 19th century ==
| Year | Date | Event |
|---|---|---|
| 1808 | | Napoleonic Wars: French Imperial Army begins the occupation of Spain. |
| 1808 | 14 June | Second Battle of the Bruch, Spanish victory. |
| 1809 | 12 December | Girona taken by the French after seven months of siege. |
| 1812 | 12 January | Napoleon incorporates Catalonia into France and divided into four French departments. |
| 1814 | | French army evacuates Catalonia. |
| 1832 | | The Bonaplata Factory commenced operation in Barcelona, the first one of the country to make use of the steam engine. |
| 1833 | | Outbreak of the First Carlist War. Parts of Catalonia's countryside falls to Carlist hands, while Liberals retains the coastal areas. |
| 1833 | November | Minister Javier de Burgos decrees the territorial division of Spain into provinces. Catalonia is divided into four provinces (Barcelona, Girona, Lleida and Tarragona). |
| 1835 | | First Barcelona bullanga (popular revolt or riot). |
| 1840 | 6 July | Carlist general Ramon Cabrera cross the border to France, ending the First Carlist War. |
| 1842 | 3 December | Bombardment of Barcelona ordered by General Espartero due to popular uprising. |
| 1843 | | Jamància, last bullanga, which vindicates a progressive political program, ending with the bombardment of Barcelona by the Spanish army led by Joan Prim. |
| 1846 | | Second Carlist War or Guerra dels Matiners. |
| 1848 | 28 October | First railway service in the Iberian Peninsula, linking Barcelona with Mataró. |
| 1855 | 2 July | Catalan general strike, being the first one carried out in Spanish history. |
| 1859 | May | Floral Games re-established, in the context of the Renaixença. |
| 1869 | 12 December | Democratic Sexennium: the Spanish provisional government autorizes the demolition of the Citadel of Barcelona. |
| 1869 | 18 May | Representatives of the federal-republican committees of Aragon, Catalonia, Valencia and the Balearic Islands sign the Tortosa Pact to work together in order to establish the Spanish Federal Republic. |
| 1870 | April | Revolt of the Quintas, town of Gràcia bombed by the Spanish army. |
| 1872 | 21 April | Outbreak of the Third Carlist War. |
| 1873 | 9 May | The Provincial Council of Barcelona, under radical federal-republican control, attempts to proclaim a Catalan State within the Spanish Federal Republic. |
| 1882 | 19 March | Gaudí's Sagrada Família church construction begins. |
| 1888 | | 1888 Barcelona Universal Exposition. |
| 1892 | | Manresa Bases, first proposal for self-government of Catalonia promoted by Catalan nationalism. |
| 1893 | 7 November | Liceu bombing attack by the anarchist Santiago Salvador. |
| 1899 | July | Tancament de caixes, tax strike in Barcelona against tax hikes in order to pay for the expenses of the Spanish–American War. |

== 20th century ==
| Year | Date | Event |
|---|---|---|
| 1901 | | Regionalist League founded. |
| 1905 | 25 November | ¡Cu-Cut! incident. Officers of the Spanish Army, angry at the magazine for having published an offending joke, storm the Cu-Cut! magazine offices. |
| 1907 | 3 August | Solidaridad Obrera labor federation founded. |
| 1909 | 25 July | Tragic Week begins. |
| 1909 | 13 October | The radical freethinker, anarchist, and educationist Francesc Ferrer i Guàrdia is executed, falsely accused of orchestrating the Tragic Week. |
| 1910 | 30 October | CNT, Anarcho-syndicalist trade union, founded in Barcelona. |
| 1911 | 6 January | First edition of the Volta a Catalunya cycle race begins. |
| 1914 | 6 April | Commonwealth of Catalonia established. Enric Prat de la Riba (Regionalist League) appointed its first president. |
| 1914 | | Library of Catalonia opens to the public. |
| 1919 | February | La Canadenca strike. Among its consequences, it forces the Spanish government to issue the first law limiting the working day to eight hours. |
| 1925 | 20 March | Miguel Primo de Rivera, Spanish dictator, disbanded the Commonwealth of Catalonia. |
| 1926 | 4 November | Events of Prats de Molló: pro-independence party Estat Català, led by Francesc Macià, tries to liberate Catalonia from France with a small army and proclaim the Catalan Republic, but it is aborted at the last minute due to a betrayal. |
| 1929 | | 1929 Barcelona International Exposition. |
| 1931 | 14 April | Francesc Macià proclaims the Catalan Republic within the "Iberian Federation". |
| 1931 | 17 April | After negotiation, the Catalan Republic becomes the Generalitat, the Catalan institution of self-government within the Spanish Republic. |
| 1932 | 18 January | Anarchist insurrection in the Alt Llobregat mining area. |
| 1932 | 9 September | Statute of Autonomy of Catalonia passed by the Spanish Parliament. Catalonia became an autonomous region within the Spanish Republic. |
| 1932 | 20 November | First election to the Parliament of Catalonia, the Republican Left of Catalonia (ERC) wins the majority of seats. |
| 1932 | 14 December | The Parliament appoints Francesc Macià (ERC) as President of Catalonia. |
| 1934 | 1 January | The Parliament appointed Lluís Companys (ERC) as President of Catalonia right after the death of Macià on 25 December 1933. |
| 1934 | 21 March | Crop Contracts Law passed by Catalan Parliament. |
| 1934 | 6 October | Lluís Companys proclaims the Catalan State of the Spanish Federal Republic. The Spanish army quickly suppress the proclamation, arresting Companys and the Catalan government. Self-government suspended. |
| 1934 | 11 November | Art Museum of Catalonia inaugurated. |
| 1936 | 19 February | After the Popular Front victory in the February 1936 Spanish general election, the Catalan government is pardoned and reinstated. |
| 1936 | 19 July | Military uprising in Barcelona, as part of the coup against the Republic. Trade unions and forces of the Generalitat defeat the coup in Barcelona. Beginning of the Spanish Civil War. Anarchists take control de facto of Catalonia. People's Olympiad of Barcelona cancelled. |
| 1936 | 21 July | Central Committee of Antifascist Militias of Catalonia established. |
| 1936 | 24 October | The Generalitat passes the Decree on Collectivization and Workers' Control. |
| 1936 | 6 December | People's Army of Catalonia raised. |
| 1937 | 3 May | May Days, clashes between the anarchists and POUM versus the forces of the Republic and the Generalitat, supported by the PSUC. The Republic recovered full control of Catalonia. |
| 1938 | 5 April | General Francisco Franco decrees the suppression of the Statute of Autonomy of Catalonia and the Generalitat. |
| 1938 | 25 July | Battle of the Ebro begins. |
| 1939 | 26 January | Barcelona occupied by the Francoist amy, Lluís Companys and the Generalitat march into exile. |
| 1940 | 15 October | President Lluís Companys is executed in Montjuïc Castle of Barcelona by firing squad in Francoist Spain. |
| 1951 | 1 March | Barcelona tram strike protesting a plan by authorities to increase tram fares by up to 40%, first open demonstration against the Dictatorship. |
| 1952 | 27 May | 35th International Eucharistic Congress held in Barcelona. |
| 1971 | 7 November | Assembly of Catalonia founded. |
| 1977 | 11 September | 1977 Catalan autonomy protest. |
| 1977 | 23 October | The exiled President of Catalonia, Josep Tarradellas, returns to Barcelona and the Generalitat of Catalonia is restored. |
| 1979 | 8 September | Statute of Autonomy of Catalonia of 1979. |
| 1980 | 20 March | First election to the reestablished Parliament of Catalonia. Convergència i Unió (CiU) became the winning party. |
| 1980 | 24 April | The Parliament appointed Jordi Pujol (CiU) as President of Catalonia. |
| 1983 | 6 April | Law of Linguistic Normalization of Catalan passed by the Parliament. |
| 1983 | 8 September | Televisió de Catalunya founded. |
| 1992 | 25 July | 1992 Summer Olympic Games held in Barcelona. |
| 1998 | 15 July | Law recognizing same-sex partnerships passed by the Parliament. Catalonia became the first Spanish territory to recognize them. |

== 21st century ==
| Year | Date | Event |
|---|---|---|
| 2002 | | First book of the Civil Code of Catalonia passed by the Parliament. |
| 2003 | 16 November | Election to the Parliament of Catalonia. The Socialists' Party of Catalonia (PSC), the Republican Left of Catalonia (ERC) and Initiative for Catalonia Greens (ICV-EUiA) are able to form a coalition government. |
| 2003 | 16 December | The Parliament appoints Pasqual Maragall (PSC) as President of Catalonia. |
| 2005 | | PADICAT is established. |
| 2006 | 9 August | Statute of Autonomy of Catalonia of 2006. |
| 2010 | 28 June | At the request of the conservative People's Party, the Constitutional Court of Spain rules against various articles of the new Statute of Autonomy. |
| 2010 | 10 July | 2010 Catalan autonomy protest. |
| 2010 | 28 July | Ban on bullfighting in Catalonia passed by the Catalan Parliament. |
| 2013 | 11 September | Catalan Way. |
| 2014 | 9 November | 2014 Catalan self-determination referendum. |
| 2015 | 9 November | Declaration of the Initiation of the Process of Independence of Catalonia. |
| 2016 | 12 January | Carles Puigdemont appointed President of Catalonia after a last minute agreement between Junts pel Sí pro-independence coalition and the far-left, pro-independence Popular Unity Candidacy (CUP). |
| 2017 | 17 August | Islamic terrorist attacks in Barcelona and Cambrils. |
| 2017 | 1 October | 2017 Catalan independence referendum. |
| 2017 | 27 October | Independence declared. |
| 2017 | 27 October | Spanish Senate invokes Article 155 of the Spanish Constitution and Prime Minister Mariano Rajoy declares the dissolution of the Catalan Parliament and dismissed Catalonia's Government. |
| 2018 | 1 May | Quim Torra appointed President of Catalonia after the Spanish courts blocked the election of Carles Puigdemont, who had the support of the Catalan Parliament after the December election. |

== See also ==
City and town timelines

- Timeline of Barcelona
- Timeline of Lleida

== Bibliography ==
- Aránzazu Ascunce Arenas (2012). "Chronology". Barcelona and Madrid: Social Networks of the Avant-Garde. Lexington Books. ISBN 978-1-61148-424-3.
- Fontana, Josep (2014). La formació d'una identitat. Una història de Catalunya. Ed. Eumo. ISBN 9788497665261.
