= Evil customs =

Evil customs (Catalan: mals usos, lit. "bad uses") were specific medieval feudal customs, generally levies, which peasants were subjected to by their feudal lords in the Crown of Aragon and the Crown of Castile. These obligations are related to the Ius Maletractandi, a right approved by the Catalan Court of 1358, which empowered the feudal lords to treat their people in ways later considered unjust.

== Catalonia ==
In the Principality of Catalonia, the population was controlled by the feudal nobility and a number of benefits were established that would later be considered evil customs. The customs were most often found in relation to the land of the so-called Old Catalonia. The ties of the peasant to the land he worked required him to pay a redemption if he wanted to leave it.

The Usages of Barcelona collected only three of the most common obligations: the intestia, cugucia and eixorquia. The evil customs with the possibility of being redeemed paying a tribute to the lord in the Sentencia Arbitral de Guadalupe were:

- Intestia: a right of nobles to confiscate of a portion, generally a third, of the property of peasants who died without making a will. Pella and Forgas said that this abuse occurred "almost in general" in the diocese of Girona. If it was a younger man who died intestate and without children, the lord of the manor received a third of it, and the rest of it was distributed for various purposes, some for the family, some for the church to pray for the soul of the deceased or as alms for the poor.
- Eixorquia: law by which the feudal lord received one-third of the inheritance of the peasant who had no descendants.
- Cugucia: If the peasant's wife was found guilty of adultery, the feudal lord received half of her dowry if the woman had the consent of her husband, or the whole of her dowry if the woman did not.
- Arsia: indemnification of the peasant who had to pay the feudal lord in case of accidental fire of his belongings.
- Ferma of forced plunder: the extraction of a part of the goods of the peasants when they guaranteed the dowry of the woman with the farm of their feudal lord, after the marriage of his vassals. The peasant had the useful domain and the feudal lord had the direct dominion.
- Personal freedom: the peasants, subject to servitude, could not leave the farm they worked without having been redeemed by their feudal lord. Emancipation did not only affect the peasant, but also his wife and, above all, his children. The price of freedom varied greatly over time and were in line with the valuation of the farm. The incorruptible maidens were redeemed by paying their feudal lord a fixed amount. In the diocese of Gerona, this was two sueldos and eight dineros.

In addition to these evil customs, other manorial customs existed, including:

- Forge of distress: the peasant was obliged to repair his work tools in the forge of the feudal lord. It was a noble monopoly on blacksmithing.
- Obligation of the mill: the peasant was obliged to grind their corn in a mill belonging to the feudal lord.
- Obligation of the furnace: the peasant was obliged to bake their bread in an oven belonging to the feudal lord, especially on lands with a concentrated population.
- Obligation of the yoke (jova): the peasant was obliged to plough the feudal lord's land with his oxen (on a yoke) during certain determined days of the year.
- Obligation of manipulation: the peasant was obliged to work corn or any other product belonging to the feudal lord.

Another custom that did not only oppress peasants but also humiliated them was the provision of arbitrary labor services. These included the use of a nursing woman to become a wet nurse for the lord's children.

== Crown of Castile ==
In the Crown of Castile, it is difficult to determine what the evil customs were, since the region was more subject to the oral tradition. Reference is made to the so-called bad fueros, feudal regimes harder in benefits. As Castile tried to attract people from other areas or kingdoms, the fueros or laws were rarely harsh. The evil customs were sporadic or were simply monetary payments. Some examples include:

- Assignment of the peasant to the land, preventing him from abandoning it.
- Banalities such as the obligation to use the mill or oven belonging to the feudal lord, with the previous payment of a fee.
- Take out bread: in France and in Castile, for example, it was forbidden to take the grain out of the feudal lordship, to avoid scarcity and speculation. However, in Castile, it could be done with the previous payment of a fee.
- The third: it was the obligation of the peasant to take over the administration of the property of the feudal lord. This burden meant hard obligations, among other things to replace any loss with the peasant's personal patrimony. This custom was banned by King Henry IV of Castile.
- The privilege of the corral: allowed the feudal lord to seize birds, calves and all type of cattle.
- Without milk: if the wife of the feudal lord had a child and could not breastfeed him, the feudal lords selected peasant women who had recently had a child and forced them to go to the castle to breastfeed their children.

== Abolition ==
The abolition of the evil or bad customs took a long time and this could primarily be attributed to the way that it formed part of the identity of the serfs, serving as an essential element in the definition of their servile bond and legal status as subordinate to the lords. Before the series of peasant revolts that stemmed from the ius malectrandi, there were already attempts on the part of the royal courts to eliminate this system of servitude. For instance, Maria de Luna, regent of Aragon, began raising the issue some time in the fifteenth century. She appealed to Pope Benedict XIII, her kinsman, citing the example of Christ (ad exemplum Crucifixi) who freed people from their bondage. King John I was also against the system and planned to procure its abolition shortly before his death in 1395.

The evil customs became one of the causes of the Catalan Civil War, which took place between the years 1460 and 1486, the year in which they were abolished by king Ferdinand II of Aragon. He issued the Sentencia Arbitral de Guadalupe, which scrapped the evil customs with a previous payment of 60 salaries per farm, and abolished the right to mistreat and many other minor landed abuses. The peasants maintained the useful domain of the farms, but they had to pay homage to the feudal lord and pay the feudal rights.
