= Remensa =

Catalan mode of serfdom

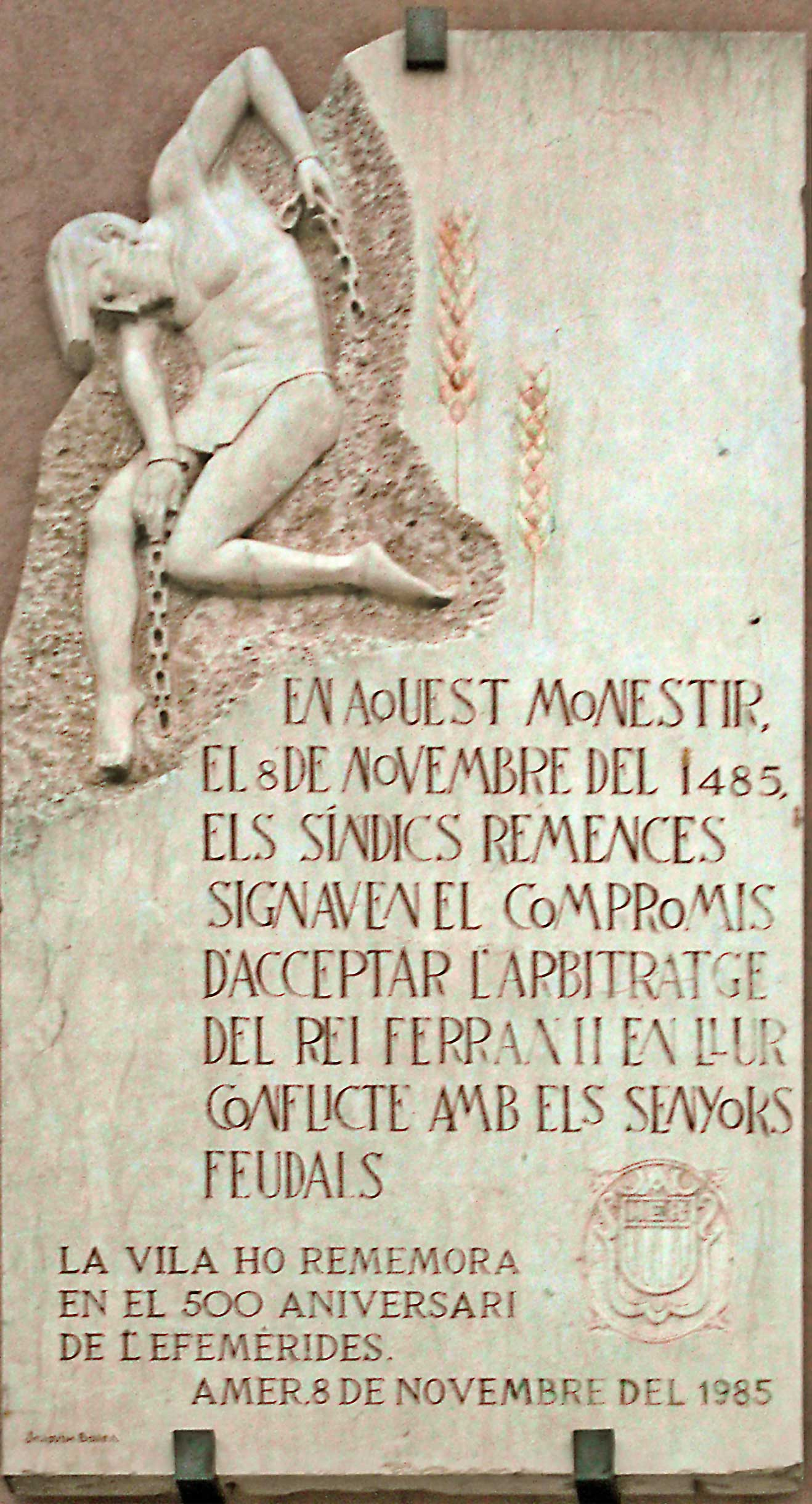
Plaque commemorating the 500th anniversary of the remences' acceptance of King Ferdinand II's mediation between the remences and the feudal lords. (Located in Amer monastery, where the arbitration occurred.)

Remensa (Catalan: Remença) was a Catalan system of serfdom. Those who were serfs under this mode are properly pagesos de remença (pagesos meaning "peasants"); they are often (though not quite correctly) referred to simply as remences (singular remença).

The Catalan term remença derives from the Latin redementia and emphasizes the possibility of redemption from servitude.

The severity of this way of life led to rebellions by the remensa peasants in 1462 and 1485 known as the War of the Remences. After the second revolt, King Ferdinand II of Aragon issued the Sentencia Arbitral de Guadalupe (1486), outlawing the more severe abuses of the oppressive 'evil customs' and allowing remensa peasants to be redeemed by a payment of 60 sous per household, leaving a rural society that was still feudal in character, but significantly reformed.

== See also ==
- History of Catalonia
- Principality of Catalonia
- Catalan Civil War
- Spain in the Middle Ages
