= Wifred II of Cerdanya =

Catalan Count of Cerdanya and Count of Berga (c.970-1050)

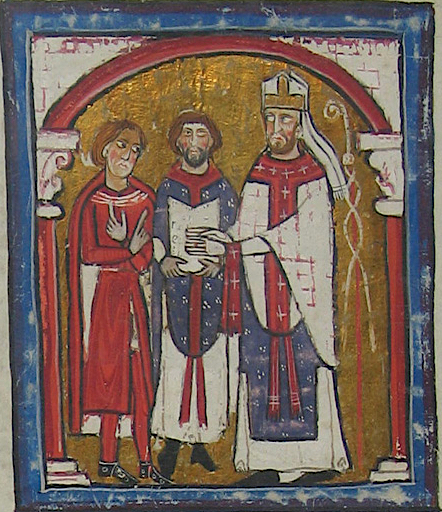
Saint Ermengol bishop of Urgell (right), swears loyalty to Wifred II, Count of Cerdanya (left); a priest holds the holy Scriptures (middle).

Wifred or Wilfred (Catalan: Guifré, Spanish: Vifredo or Wifredo) (c. 970 – 1050) was the Count of Cerdanya (988–1035; as Wifred II) and Count of Berga (1003–1035; as Wifred I). He was the eldest son of Oliba Cabreta and Ermengard of Empúries.

== Life ==
When his father abdicated in 988 to become a monk in Monte Cassino, Wifred's brother Bernard received Besalú while Oliba received Berga. Their mother acted as regent until 994. When Oliba followed his father into the church in 1003, his county passed to Wifred. In that year Wifred and Bernard joined an alliance of Christian princes to fend off a Muslim invasion at the Battle of Torà.

Like his father and brother before him, he had a great affection for the church. He participated actively in the consecration of many churches and monasteries, such as San Martín del Canigó, founded in 1007 and consecrated in 1009. Despite this, he did fight to free his county from the jurisdiction of the diocese of Urgell and thus entered into conflict with Saint Ermengol.

In 1023, Wifred entered into a peace concord with Berengar Raymond I of Barcelona and William I of Besalú. In the early thirteenth-century Liber feudorum Ceritaniae the first folio is illuminated with a scene of Wifred receiving the homage of Sarn and Dalmau, lords of Castellfollit. The picture, painted by a different artist from the rest of book, is of a higher calibre than the others and is in the Byzantinist style that was becoming dominant in Catalonia around 1200.

In 1035, he finally followed his father and brother into monastic retirement, becoming a monk in his own foundation of San Martín del Canigó. He died some fifteen years later in 1050. His mortuary roll was taken as far as Liège where the local cathedral chapter contributed fourteen poems.

== Marriage and issue ==
By his marriage to Guisla of Pallars, he had many children:

- Raymond (1035–1068), successor in Cerdanya
  - William I, Count of Cerdanya
- Wifred (died 1079), archbishop of Narbonne
- Berengar (died 1053), bishop of Elna
- Arduin (died 1050)
- William Wifred (died 1075), bishop of Urgell
- Bernard (died 1050), successor in Berga
- Berengar (died 1093), successor of Bernard in Berga and bishop of Girona
- Fe (also Fides or Foy), married Hugh of Rouergue

== Notes ==
Preceded by Oliba Cabreta	Count of Cerdanya; 988–1035	Succeeded by Raymond
Preceded by Oliba	Count of Berga; 1003–1035	Succeeded by Bernard I
