= County of Conflent =

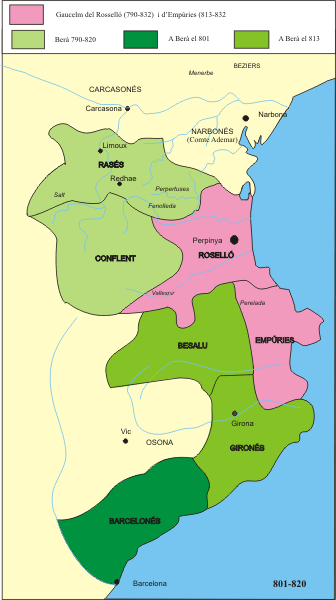
Conflent in the context of the western Spanish march in the early ninth century.

The County of Conflent or Confluent (Latin: Confluensis) was one of the Catalan counties of the Marca Hispanica in the ninth century. Usually associated with the County of Cerdanya and the county of Razès, it was located to the west of Roussillon. It largely corresponded to the modern comarca of Conflent.

== History ==
In Roman times Conflent was a pagus (district) dependent on Ruscino, the nucleus of later Roussillon. After the Christianisation of the fifth century, Conflent became an archdeaconry of the Diocese of Elne. Historically, the western border of Conflent has been that between the dioceses of Elne and Urgel in the plain of Perxa. To the west of the boundary was Cerdanya. Conflent went through a Visigothic and then a Moorish phase before it was reconstituted as a county by the Franks. It was initially attached to the County of Razès and the Barcelona.

Conflent was one of the last Catalan counties to see widespread grants of aprisiones, which were not commonplace until the 890s. Serfdom, though less common there than elsewhere, existed in Conflent in the late ninth century.

Until 870 Conflent was also attached to the counties of Urgell and Cerdanya, but in that year Charles the Bald granted it to Miro the Elder, who already governed the Capcir and Fenouilledès. Under Miro's governance the monastery of Sant Andreu d'Eixalada (which was destroyed in a storm in 878) was replaced by the new foundation of Sant Miquel de Cuixà. When Miro died Conflent passed to his brother Wilfred the Hairy. Under Wilfred's heirs the nominal authority of the Carolingian monarch was disregarded and Conflent was ruled as a family possession. Already in the reign of Charles the Bald much of the royal fisc in Conflent had been granted away. Throughout the tenth and eleventh centuries, Conflent was attached to Cerdagne, which was almost always more prominent.

In the mid-tenth century Conflent experienced a period of encastellation. Two castles, Castellano and Turres Betses, appear by the 950s; castles were more common in the Spanish and Gothic marches as one approached the border with the Moors: Conflent therefore lay somewhere in the middle in terms of density of fortifications.

Under Wilfred II, however, it achieved prominence over Cerdagne when he built a palace at Corneilla-de-Conflent and resided there frequently. He also founded the new monastery of San Martín de Canigó (1000), to which he retired in 1035. About 1089 count William Raymond transferred the capital from Cornellá de Conflent to Vilafranca de Conflent, which he had founded.

When the line of the counts of Cerdanya and Conflent died out in 1117, and the counties were inherited by Raymond Berengar III of Barcelona, the county of Conflent was quick to disappear from the administrative language. In 1118 Raymond Berengar "by the counsel and directive of the magnates and the knights of the whole county of Cerdanya and Conflent" and jointly with the bishop of Elne established a peace in Conflent and Cerdanya. He also stabilised the coinage of Conflent (for a tax) and took an oath of fealty from the castellans. By 1126 Conflent was a vegueria within the county of Cerdanya or, more usually, Roussillon. Capcir was a sotsvegueria (major subdivision) of the vegueria of Conflent.

Conflent remained as a recognisable feudal unit as late as c.1200, when it was one of three counties (along with Cerdanya and Roussillon) whose charters were gathered together in the great cartulary called the Liber feudorum Ceritaniae.

== Counts of Conflent ==
- 801 – 812 Bera
- 812 – 827 Guillemundus
- 828 – 832 Gaucelm
- 832 – 835 Berengar
- 837 – 844 Bernard
- 844 – 848 Sunifred I
- 848 – 860 Oliba II
- 860 – 870 Salomon
- 870 – 895 Miro I
- 895 – 897 Wilfred I the Hairy
- 897 – 927 Miro II
- 927 – 968 Sunifred II
- 968 – 984 Miro III
- 968 – 988 Oliba III Cabreta
- 988 – 1035 Wilfred II
- 1035 – 1068 William Raymond
- 1068 – 1095 William I
- 1095 – 1109 William II Jordan
- 1109 – 1117 Bernard

== Sources ==
- Lewis, Archibald Ross. The Development of Southern French and Catalan Society, 718–1050. University of Texas Press: Austin, 1965.
- Bisson, Thomas N. "Mediterranean Territorial Power in the Twelfth Century." Proceedings of the American Philosophical Society, Vol. 123, No. 2. (Apr. 27, 1979), pp 143–150.
- Bisson, Thomas N. "Celebration and Persuasion: Reflections on the Cultural Evolution of Medieval Consultation." Legislative Studies Quarterly, Vol. 7, No. 2. (May, 1982), pp 181–204.
