= Claret (disambiguation) =

Claret is an English name for red Bordeaux wine.

Claret may also refer to:

== Places ==
- Claret, Alpes-de-Haute-Provence, France
- Claret, Hérault, France
- Claret (Torà), Catalonia, Spain
- Claret (Tremp), Catalonia, Spain

== Other ==
- Claret (color), a deep shade of red
- Claret (surname)
- Claret Ash, a variety of tree
- Claret School, Catholic all-boys schools named after Anthony Mary Claret
- Claret Jug, a golf trophy
- Operation Claret, a series of raids during the Indonesia–Malaysia confrontation
- Australian & British slang for blood, such as from a sports injury
- A player or supporter of Burnley F.C.

== See also ==
- Claret cup (disambiguation)
- Clarete (disambiguation)
- Clarette
- Claretta (disambiguation)
