= Bernat Guillem (bishop of Urgell) =

Bishop of Urgell in Northern Spain from 1072 to 1092

Bernat Guillermo was bishop of Urgell in Northern Spain from 1072 to 1092. He was Appointed Bishop of Urgell, in Rome on 15 Jan 1076, by Pope Gregory VII, succeeding Bishop Guillem Guifredo. Very little is known of the details of his episcopate.
