= Claretta (disambiguation) =

Claretta (English title: Claretta Petacci) is a 1984 Italian historical drama film written and directed by Pasquale Squitieri.

Claretta may also refer to:

- Claretta (grape)
- Claretta and Ben (Italian: Permettete signora che ami vostra figlia?), a 1974 Italian comedy film directed by Gian Luigi Polidoro
- Clara Petacci (1912–1945), mistress of Italian dictator Benito Mussolini

== See also ==
- Claret (disambiguation)
- Clarete (disambiguation)
- Clarette, a white wine grape
