= Raymond I of Cerdanya =

Catalan noble

Raymond I of Cerdanya (Catalan: Ramon I de Cerdanya) (?–1068) was the count of Cerdanya and of Conflent (1035–1068) and of Berga (1050–1068).

He was the eldest son of Wifred II, Count of Cerdanya and Guisla of Pallars. His brothers were Bernard I of Berga and Berengar of Berga. He inherited the County of Cerdanya upon his father's death in 1035. When his brother Bernard I died in 1050 and his other brother Berengar renounced the County of Berga to become a bishop, Raymond also inherited the County of Berga.

He collected taxes from the Saracens and his usual residence was at Ix. He fought against Ermengol III, Count of Urgell, who had the support of Ramon Berenguer I of Barcelona, but ended up signing a peace agreement with Urgell around 1050–51. In 1058, he agreed to help the Count of Barcelona liquidate the Saracen enclave of Les Oluges, in the upper Segarra. Later he supported Ramon Berenguer I of Barcelona in his actions against the Saracens of Saragossa, Lleida and Tortosa.
He also paid tribute to the count of Barcelona and had his heir marry the count's daughter Sança.

== Marriage and issue ==
He married Adela, who survived him, and had

- William I, Count of Cerdanya (?-1095), Count of Cerdanya and Berga,
- Enric de Cerdanya (?-1102),
- Clemència de Cerdanya (?-?), married to Arnau-Riculf, lord of So.

Preceded by Wifred II	Count of Cerdanya; 1035–1068	Succeeded by William I
Preceded by Berengar of Berga	Count of Berga; 1050–1068	Succeeded by William I
