= Torà =

- Municipality
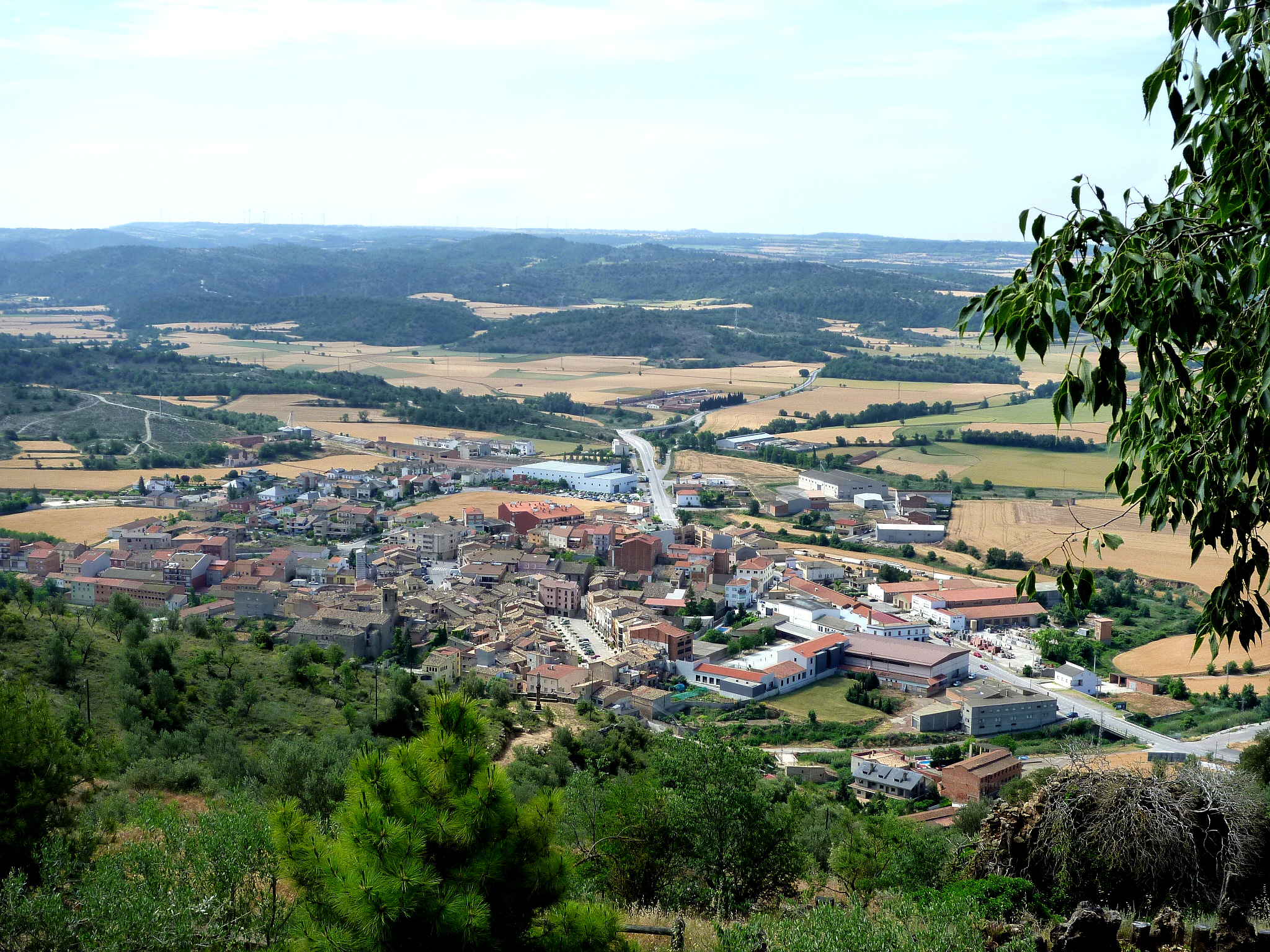
- Torà - View from l'Aguda

- Location of Torà within Spain
- Coordinates: 41°48′41.05″N 001°24′13.88″E
- Country: Spain
- Region: Catalonia
- Province: Lleida
- Region: Central Catalonia
- Comarca: Solsonès

Government
  - Mayor: Magí Coscollola Andreu (2015)

Area
  - Total: 93.3 km^{2} (36.0 sq mi)
- Elevation: 448 m (1,470 ft)

Population (2025-01-01)
  - Total: 1,190
  - Density: 12.8/km^{2} (33.0/sq mi)
- Demonym: toranès/toranesa
- Time zone: UTC+1 (CET)
  - Summer (DST): UTC+2 (CEST)
- Postal code: 25750
- Area code: 34 (Spain) + 973 (Lleida)
- Website: www.tora.cat

Torà (Catalan pronunciation: [toˈɾa]; Spanish: Torá) is a town and municipality in the North East of the comarca (county) of Solsonès, in the province of Lleida, Catalonia, Spain.

The urban structure of the center has retained most of its original design, with narrow, twisting streets and blocks formed by rows of attached buildings. The Medieval town grew around a castle or fortified place (Thoranum castrum). A particular trait of the fortified origin of the town is the presence of a number of portals to allow several streets their pass through defensive barriers formed by the rows of buildings of the town and its walls. Torà is some 10 kilometers northeast from the more populated Guissona (7,774), a neighbor town that has experienced an important economic development in the last half century (mainly due to meat production and generation of a meat packing industry) parallel to an unprecedented demographic growth sped up in the recent years (from 3,060 inhabitants in 1998 to 6,145 in 2010).

The municipality stretches along la Vall (valley) de la Riera (creek or brook) de Llanera (the Valley of Llanera's Creek) up to the confluence with the Llobregós River. Its orography is rather uneven with the lowest point at 430m and peaks rising up to 850m above sea level. The North sector features el Tossal (a kind of hill) de l'Aguda (L'Aguda's Hill), el Tossal de Sant Donat (Snat Donat's Hill), and the creek named la Riera de Llanera flowing across. On the other hand, the South sector features the hills el Tossal de Sant Pere and el Tossal de la Pineda, crossed by la Riera de Cellers, one of the Riera de Llanera's tributary brooks merging on its left. The town is settled by the left bank of the creek la Riera de Llanera, near the confluence with the Llobregós River, at the bottom of the mountain range la Serra de l'Aguda.
In 1968, the former municipality of Llanera was integrated to Torà.

== Districts and neighbourhoods ==
These are the populated places present in the municipality of Torà:

- Cellers (South East)
- Claret (South East)
- Fontanet (Center)
- Llanera (North East)
- Sant Serni de Llanera (East)
- Torà nuclear town (South West)
- Vallferosa (North)

== History ==
=== Battle of Torà ===
There was a battle of the Reconquista fought between an alliance of Catalan counts and an army of the Caliphate of Córdoba in 1003 AD at Torà.

== Culture ==
=== Festivals ===
- La festa major (the main festival of the town) on 1 September, the feast day of Sant Gil (Saint Giles, the patron saint of Torà, extended to the first weekend of that month.
- La Festa del Brut i la Bruta (the street party of He-brute and She-brute), in the weekend previous to the annual Carnestoltes (carnival).
- La festa del Roser (Rosebush Festival), in May.
- Revetlles populars de barri (neighborhood street verbenas, country fairs) in the beginning of the summer, after la Revetlla de Sant Joan (St. John's Eve on midsummer).

== Main sights ==
=== Municipal constructions ===
- Plaça del Vall (Moat's Square), the Main Square
- Plaça de la Font (Fountain's Square), in the nucleus
- Font dels Dolors (a public fountain), 200m from the nucleus
- Casa de la Vila (the City Hall), a previous hospital located in Plaça del Vall
- Museu del Pa (local Bread Museum)
- Cementiri (the town's cemetery)
- Aqüeducte dels Frares (aqueduct of the frays) behind Casa Farguell in the place known as Camí dels Tísics. Built with blind round arches, 120m remaining
- Pont de les Merites de Torà (ancient stone bridge) nearby the cemetery, with a round arch
- Pontet del Diable also called Pontet de la Sentiu, the remains of an aqueduct part of Rec del Moriquers also called Rec d'Ivorra, an acequia (a community-operated waterway) started in 1366, in use until 1920. Outside the town toward the South
- Pou del Gel (an ancient ice well)

=== Military constructions and buildings ===
- Castell de l'Aguda (castle): in l'Aguda de Torà (ruins, expoliated)
- Torre de Vallferosa (fortified watchtower): in Vallferosa (highly restored)
- Casa Castell de Llanera (castle-house): in Llanera (fortified manor house, very damaged, expoliated)

=== Romanesque architecture ===
- Monestir de Sant Celdoni i Sant Ermenter de Cellers (monastery): with three crossing apses and a crypt, in Cellers
- Església de Claret (church), 12th century (highly reformed)
- Església de Sant Miquel (church): in Fontanet
- Església de Santa Maria de Llanera (church): in Llanera (expoliated)
- Església de Sant Salvador (church): in l'Aguda de Torà

=== Jewish legacy ===
- Antic call jueu de Torà (the former Jewish quarter): in Torà's central nucleus

Location: Carrer Nou, with access through two portals: Portal Nou at Plaça del Pati (Courtyard's Square), and a portal at Plaça de l'Església (Church's Square)

=== Other monumental buildings ===
- Convent de Sant Anatoni de Pàdua (a convent devoted to Saint Anthony of Padua), built between 1697 and 1747
- L'Hostal (hostal), still in use
- Església de Santa Maria (church): in Vallferosa (expoliated)

== Gallery ==
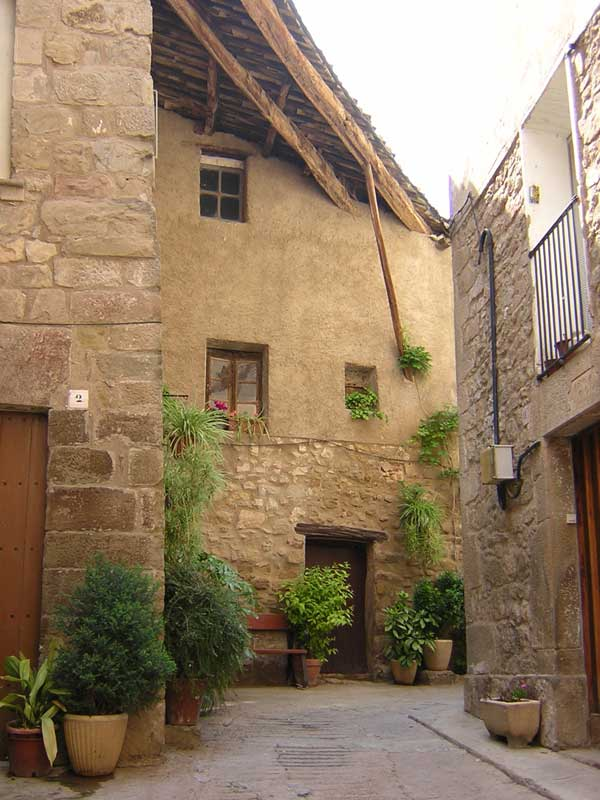
Torà - Street

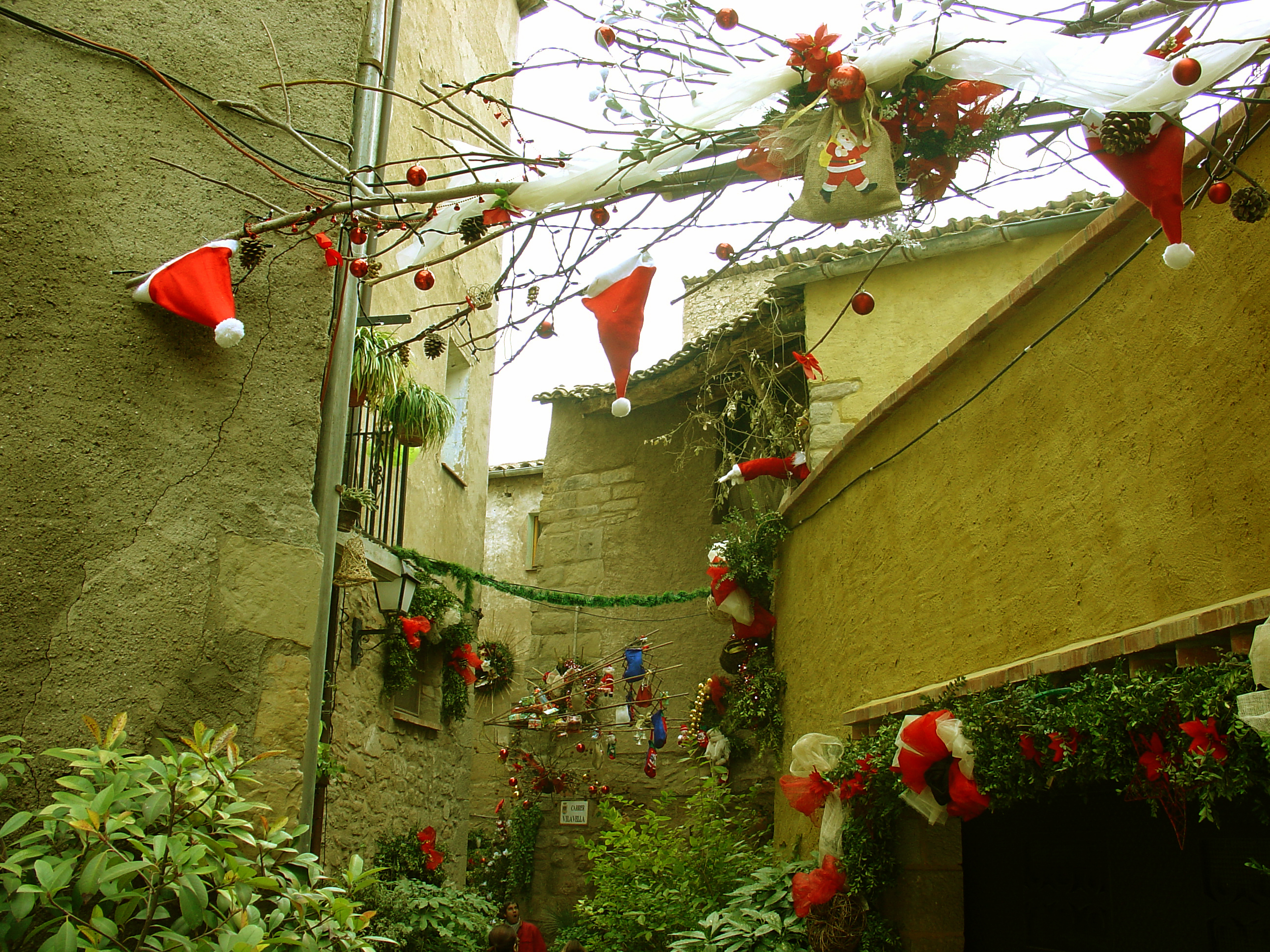
Torà in Christmas

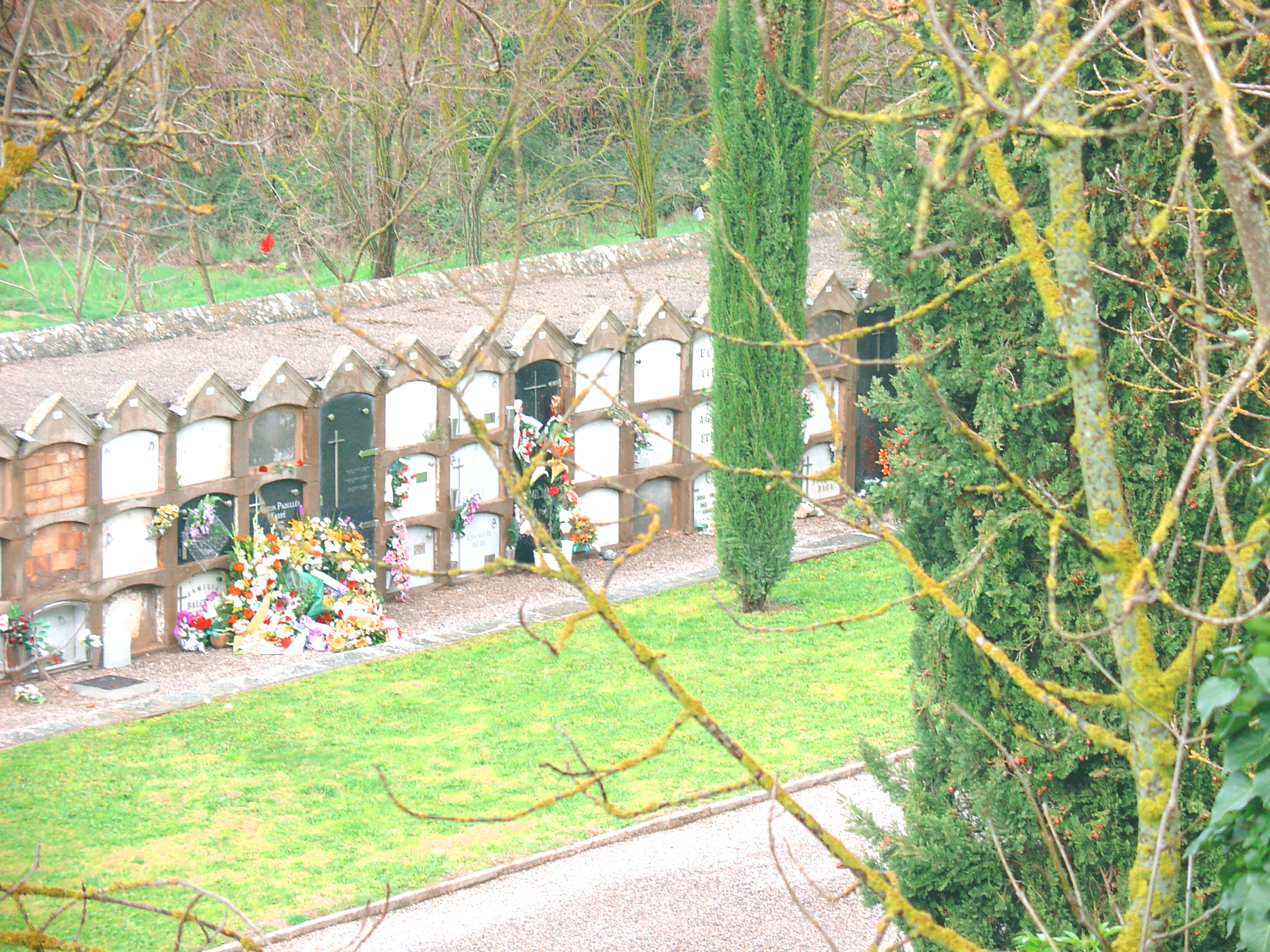
Torà - The town's cemetery, taken from Avinguda de l'Aguda (l'Aguda de Torà Avenue)

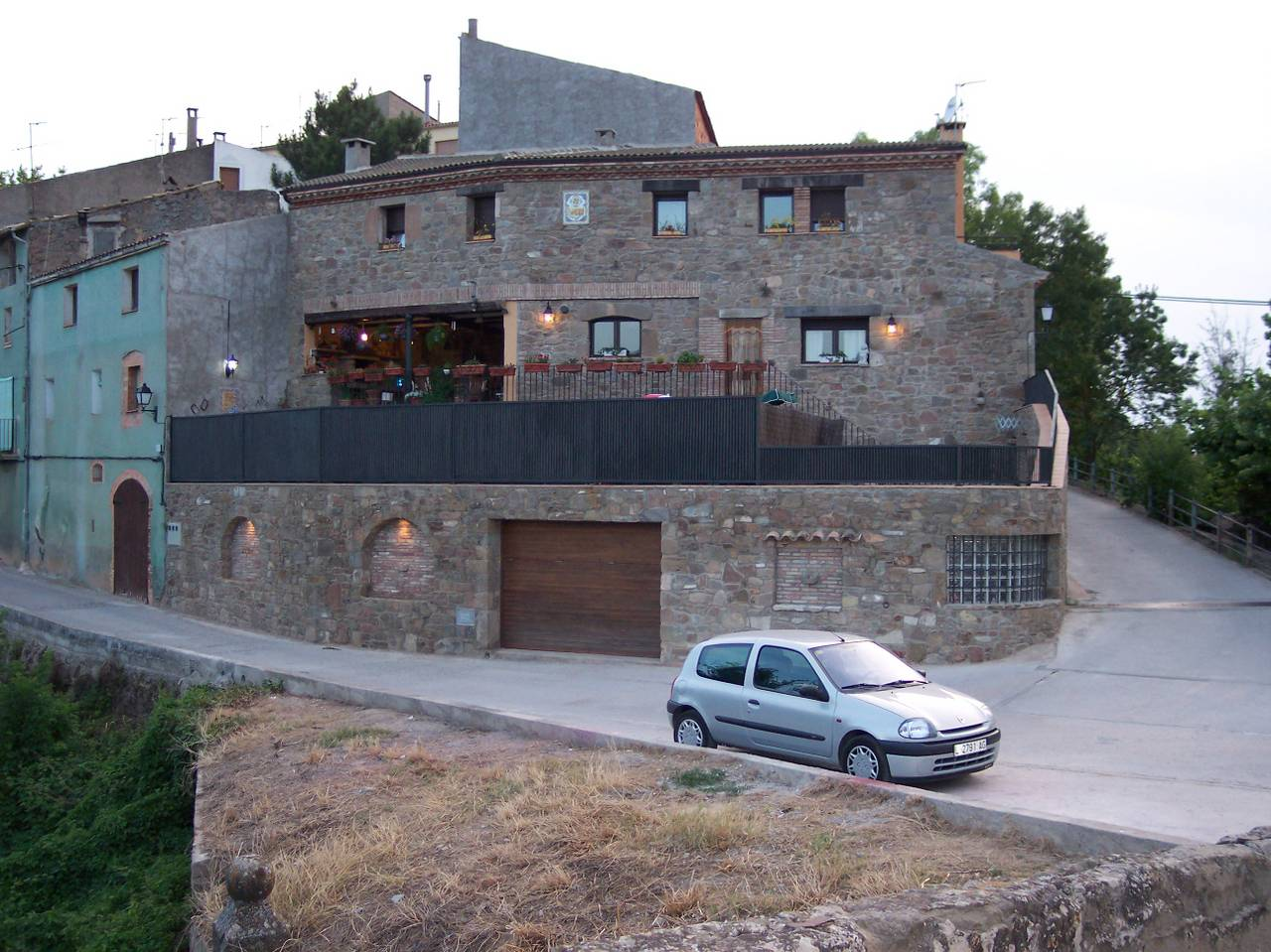
Torà - Ca na Núria (Núria's house), Avinguda del Cementiri (Cemetery Av.) and Camí del Pont de Marites (Marites' Bridge's Farm Road)

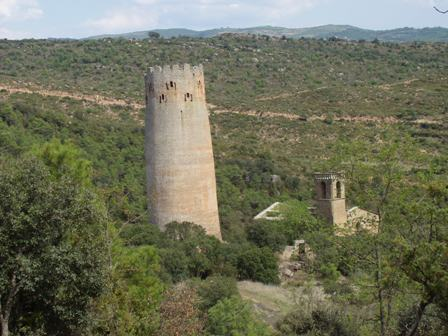
Torà - Torre de Vallferosa (fortified watchtower)

Torà - Plaça del Vall (main square) - Holy Friday market (1983)

== Communications ==
Torà is along the county road C-1412. Coming from Balaguer, C-1313 towards La Seu d'Urgell until Ponts and then, the road C-1412 towards Calaf. Coming from Cervera, the national road N-141, then the local road LV-3003.

== Demographics ==
Historical population

Year	Pop.	±% p.a.
1497	140	—
1515	92	−2.31%
1553	196	+2.01%
1717	914	+0.94%
1787	1,255	+0.45%
1857	1,969	+0.65%
1877	1,567	−1.14%

Year	Pop.	±% p.a.
1887	1,499	−0.44%
1900	1,303	−1.07%
1910	1,309	+0.05%
1920	1,294	−0.12%
1930	1,567	+1.93%
1940	1,534	−0.21%
1950	1,511	−0.15%

Year	Pop.	±% p.a.
1960	1,442	−0.47%
1970	1,335	−0.77%
1981	1,288	−0.33%
1990	1,181	−0.96%
1992	1,131	−2.14%
1994	1,155	+1.06%
1996	1,143	−0.52%

Year	Pop.	±% p.a.
1998	1,174	+1.35%
2000	1,191	+0.72%
2002	1,220	+1.21%
2004	1,231	+0.45%
2006	1,327	+3.83%
2009	1,367	+0.99%

== See also ==
- Battle of Torà
- Battle of Albesa
- Guissona (closest town to Torà, some 10 km away Southwest.)
