= Battle of Torà =

Historic battle on the Iberian peninsula

Coordinates: 41°48′41.05″N 1°24′13.88″W

- Part of the Reconquista
Date	1003 Estimated
Location	Torà, Lleida
Result	Christian victory

Belligerents
County of Barcelona; County of Besalú; County of Cerdanya; County of Urgell	Emirate of Córdoba

Commanders and leaders
Raymond Borell; Bernard I Wifred II; Ermengol I	Abd al-Malik al-Muzaffar

Strength
Unknown	17,000

Casualties and losses
Unknown	Unknown

The Battle of Torà was a defensive battle of the Reconquista, fought between an alliance of Catalan counts and an army of the Caliphate of Córdoba in 1003 at Torà, Lleida. The main source for the battle is Andrew of Fleury, who probably received his information, which is detailed and generally accurate, during a trip to the Catalonia. He incorporated the account in his Miracula sancti Benedicti around 1043.

The four Christian counts of the battle were Raymond Borell of Barcelona, Bernard I of Besalú, Wifred II of Cerdanya, and Ermengol I of Urgell. The German historian of the Crusades Carl Erdmann supposed the leader of the Muslim army to be Abd al-Malik, the son of the recently deceased hajib Almanzor. When Andrew records that the caliph himself, then Hisham II, died in the encounter, he is probably rehearsing a local legend. The battle is not dated precisely by any chronicler, but the names of the counts (all given by Andrew) restrict it to between the years 992 and 1010. A date of 1003 has been deduced by Erdmann from other accounts that a Muslim army moved through the County of Barcelona and passed into the south of the County of Urgell in the summer of 1003. The exact location of the battle, Thoranum castrum (the castle, or fortified place, of Torà), is given by Andrew. The Muslims, according to both Latin and Arabic sources, were defeated and one of their leading men killed. The Muslims retreated to their own territory, where a second battle was fought at Albesa. The result of this second battle is unclear, but it was the end of the brief war, and possibly the campaigning season.

Importantly, Andrew reports the battle in terms as if describing a holy war. The Muslims, whose numbers he puts at 17,000, are "new Philistines". Bernard of Besalú he quotes as reasoning that if the saints Peter and Michael and the Virgin Mary each kill 5,000 Muslims, there will be a manageable number left for the soldiers. Bernard recalls that the Muslims are often slain before they have a chance to retreat. According to Andrew, after the battle the Virgin Mary miraculously brought news of the Christian victory to as far away as Monte Sant'Angelo. Despite the theme of religious warfare, Spanish historians have not picked up on Andrew's account.
