= Cellers (Torà) =

- Locality
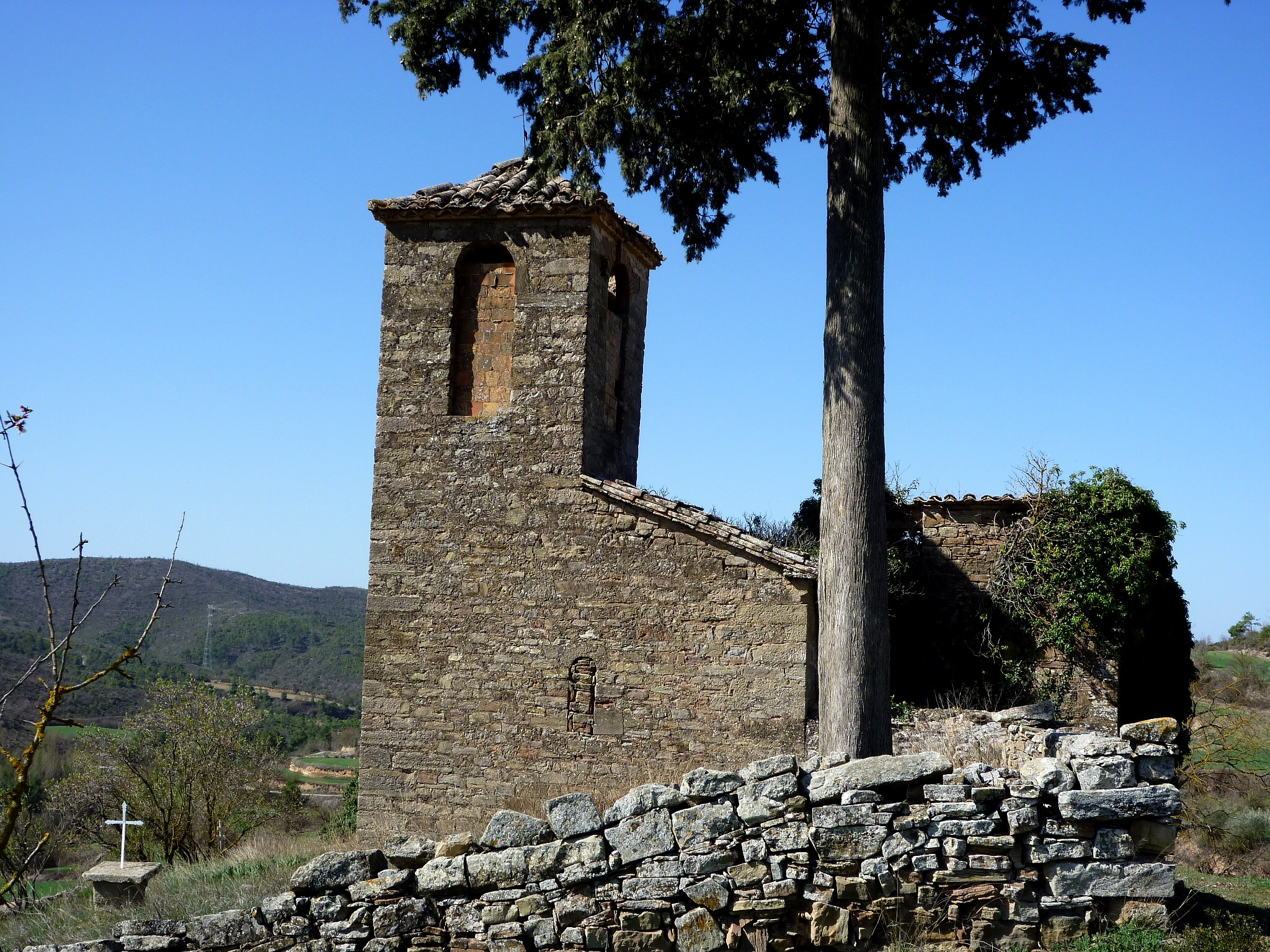

- Location within Province of Lleida Location within Catalonia Location within Spain
- Coordinates: 41°48′42″N 1°28′35″E
- Country: Spain
- Community: Catalonia
- Province: Lleida
- Municipality: Torà
- Elevation: 549 m (1,801 ft)

Population
  - Total: 24

Cellers is a locality located in the municipality of Torà, in Province of Lleida province, Catalonia, Spain. As of 2020, it has a population of 24.

== Geography ==
Cellers is located 96km east-northeast of Lleida.
