= Llanera (Torà) =

- Locality
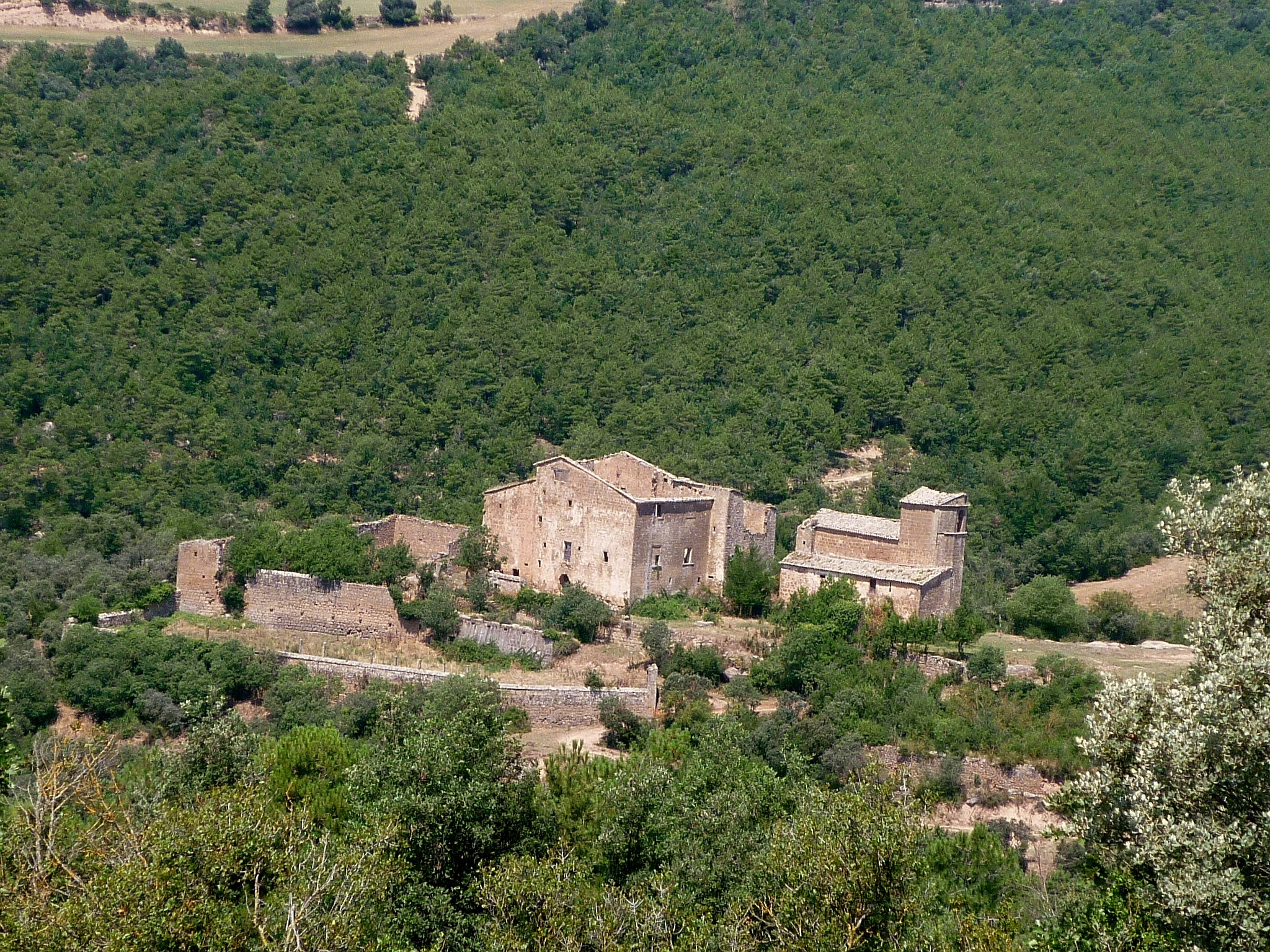

- Location within Province of Lleida Location within Catalonia Location within Spain
- Coordinates: 41°50′38″N 1°27′58″E
- Country: Spain
- Community: Catalonia
- Province: Lleida
- Municipality: Torà
- Elevation: 615 m (2,018 ft)

Population
  - Total: 39

Llanera is a locality located in the municipality of Torà, in Province of Lleida province, Catalonia, Spain. As of 2020, it has a population of 39.

== Geography ==
Llanera is located 97km east-northeast of Lleida.
