= Fontanet (Torà) =

- Locality
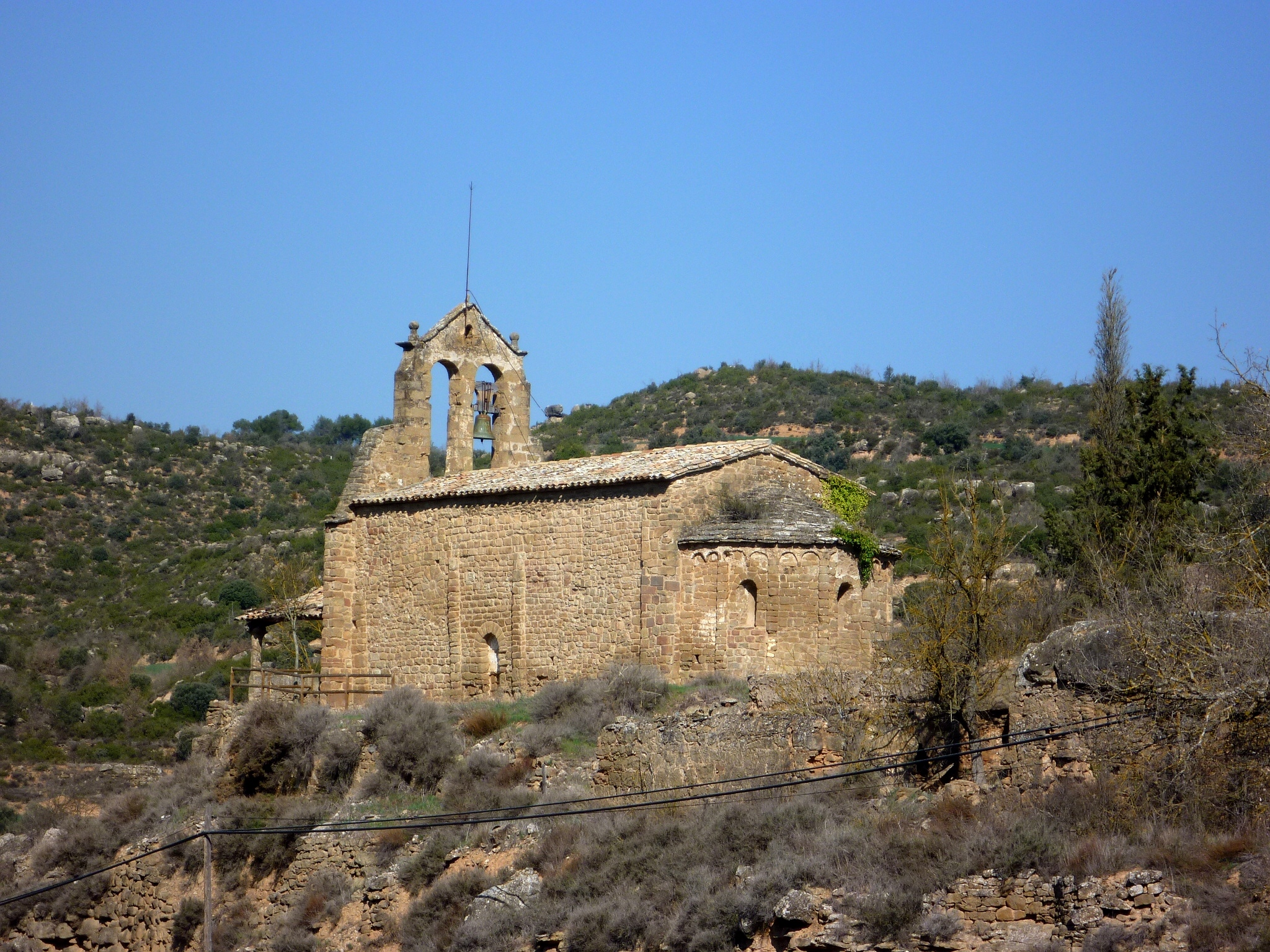

- Location within Province of Lleida Location within Catalonia Location within Spain
- Coordinates: 41°49′22″N 1°25′20″E
- Country: Spain
- Community: Catalonia
- Province: Lleida
- Municipality: Torà
- Elevation: 470 m (1,540 ft)

Population
  - Total: 14

Fontanet is a locality located in the municipality of Torà, in Province of Lleida province, Catalonia, Spain. As of 2020, it has a population of 14.

== Geography ==
Fontanet is located 92km east-northeast of Lleida.
