= Vallferosa (Torà) =

- Locality
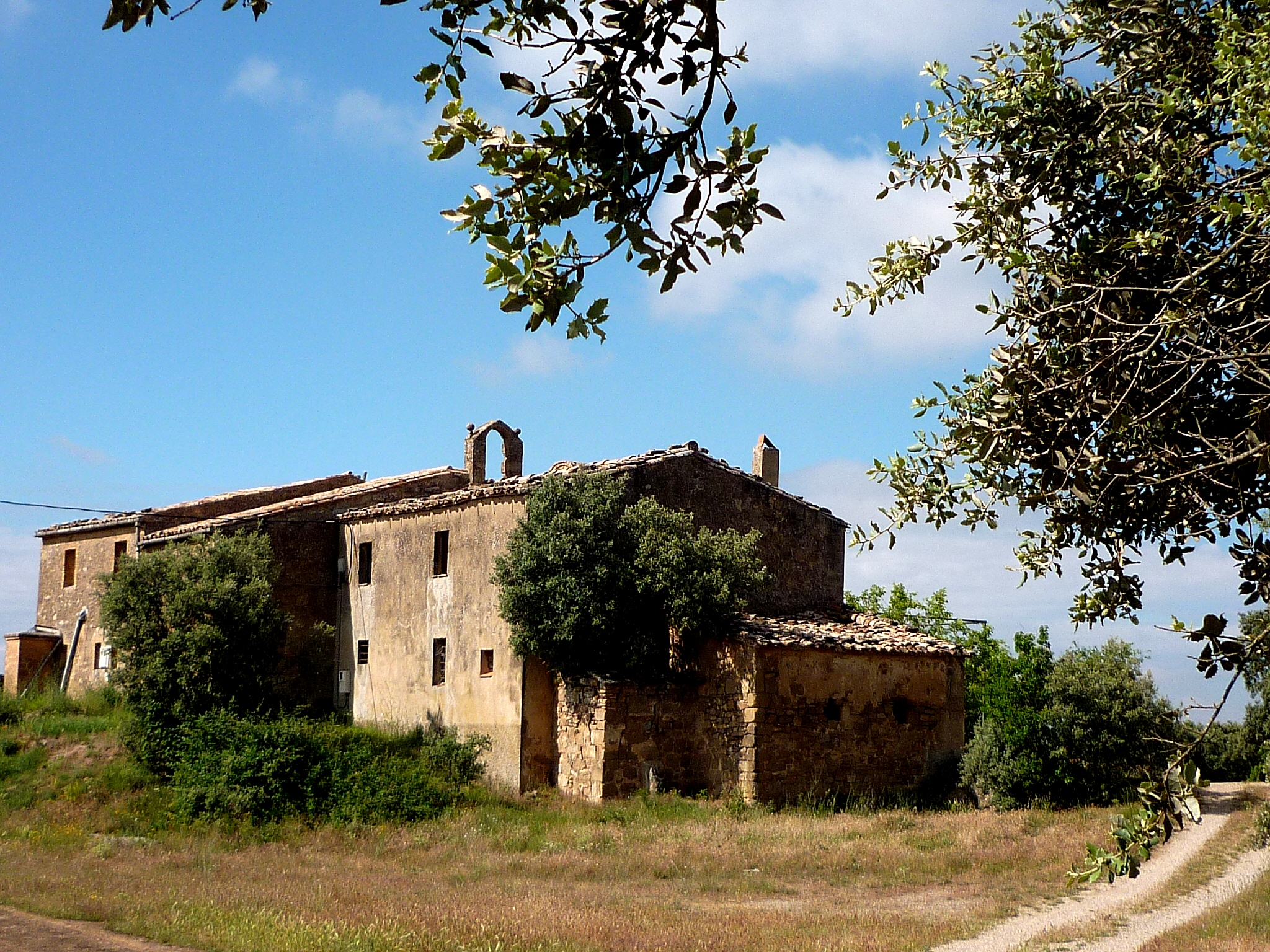

- Location within Province of Lleida Location within Catalonia Location within Spain
- Coordinates: 41°51′48″N 1°26′24″E
- Country: Spain
- Community: Catalonia
- Province: Lleida
- Municipality: Torà
- Elevation: 638 m (2,093 ft)

Population
  - Total: 29

Vallferosa is located in the municipality of Torà, in Province of Lleida province, Catalonia, Spain. As of 2020 it had a population of 29.

== Geography ==
Vallferosa is located 99km east-northeast of Lleida.
