= Abbot Oliba =

Catalan count, abbot and bishop (c.971-1046)

- Abat Oliba
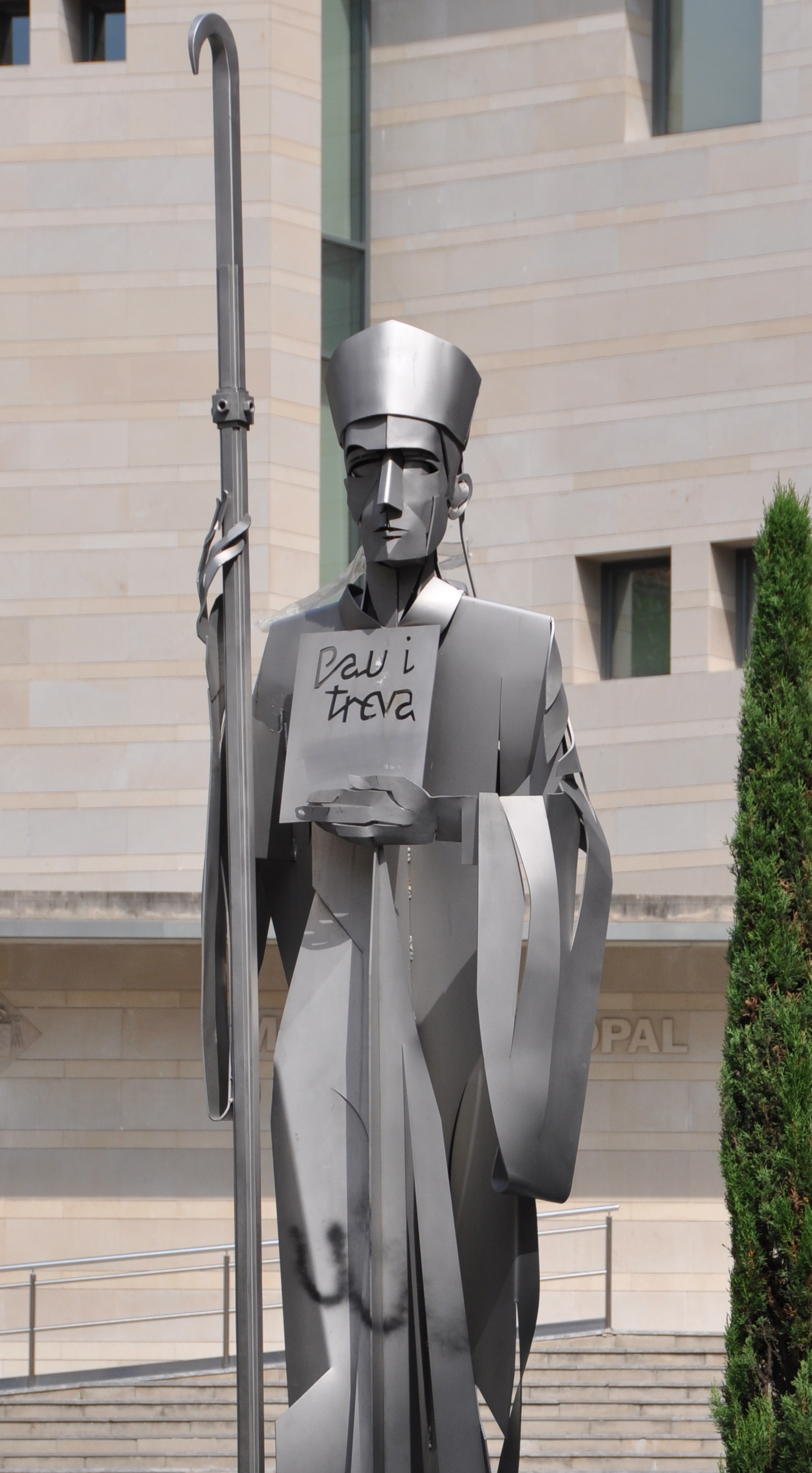
- Statue of Oliba in Vic
- Born: 971
- Died: 1046
- Occupations: Abbot, bishop, count
- Known for: Spiritual founder of Catalonia

Oliba (IPA: [uˈliβə]; c. 971–1046) was the count of Berga and Ripoll (988–1002), and later abbot of the monasteries of Santa Maria de Ripoll and Sant Miquel de Cuixà (1008–1046) and the bishop of Vic (1018–1046). He is considered one of the spiritual founders of Catalonia and perhaps the most important prelate of his age in the Iberian Peninsula. Oliba was a great writer, and from his scriptorium at Ripoll flowed a ceaseless stream of works which are enlightening about his world. Most important are the Arabic manuscripts he translated into Latin for the benefit of 11th-century and later scholars.

== Early life ==
Oliba was born circa 971 to an affluent family in the Spanish March. His father was Oliba Cabreta, the count of Besalú, Cerdanya, Berga and Ripoll, and his mother was Ermengard of Empúries. His father's lineage made him the great-grandson of Wilfred the Hairy. Oliba had three brothers and a sister, and when his father chose to retire to a monastery in 988, his lands were divided among his three oldest sons; Bernard received Besalú, Wilfred received Cerdanya, and Oliba received Berga and Ripoll. In 1002, Oliba abdicated his secular possessions to his brothers, with Wilfred receiving Berga and Bernard getting Ripoll. Oliba then took up the Benedictine habit, residing at the Monastery of Santa Maria de Ripoll.

== Church life ==
Six years after joining the order, Oliba was named abbot at Santa Maria de Ripoll, and also at Sant Miquel de Cuixà shortly thereafter.

Oliba promoted the movement of the Peace and Truce of God beginning about 1022. In 1027 a council of bishops and noblemen took place in Toulouges, a town in Roussillon (North Catalonia), and it was agreed to establish days during which there would be no violence between Christians - initially Sundays and Holy Days - and that fugitives could take refuge in churches and holy places, sure of being protected. This was in addition to the already established principle of the movement: to protect peasants, the clergy and other defenceless individuals by threat of excommunication.

So influential was Oliba that, in 1023, King Sancho III of Navarre consulted him on the propriety of marrying his sister Urraca to her second cousin, Alfonso V of León. The bishop objected, but Sancho ignored him. Oliba's letters to the various contemporaneous kings of Spain indicate that Alfonso and his successor, Vermudo III were regarded as imperatores, while the king of Navarre was a mere rex, though eventually rex Ibericus.

Oliba founded the monastery of Santa María de Montserrat (1025), reformed others such as Sant Miquel de Fluvià and Sant Martí del Canigó, and consecrated or patronised numerous other churches, such as the Collegiate Basilica of Manresa. He also created the Assemblies of Peace and Truce, the seeds of the future Catalan Corts, to aid the nobles in the administration of the realm. He improved the decoration of his own church at Ripoll and rededicated it on 15 January 1032. He was a close advisor to Count Berenguer Ramon I of Barcelona and reconstructed the cathedral of Vic with the support of Berenguer Ramon's mother, the Countess Ermesinde. The new cathedral was rededicated to Saints Peter and Paul on 31 August 1038. Oliba died at his monastery at Cuixà in 1046.

== Legacy ==
In 1973, the Abat Oliba College was established as a private branch of the University of Barcelona. In 2003, the Catalan government (Generalitat de Catalunya) approved the conversion of Abat Oliba College to the Abat Oliba CEU University. The founders named the institution after Abbot Oliba because they "aimed to embrace the spirit of Oliba who one thousand years ago established the foundations of the nascent Catalonia on the basis of Roman and Christian culture". (English translation)

== Gallery ==
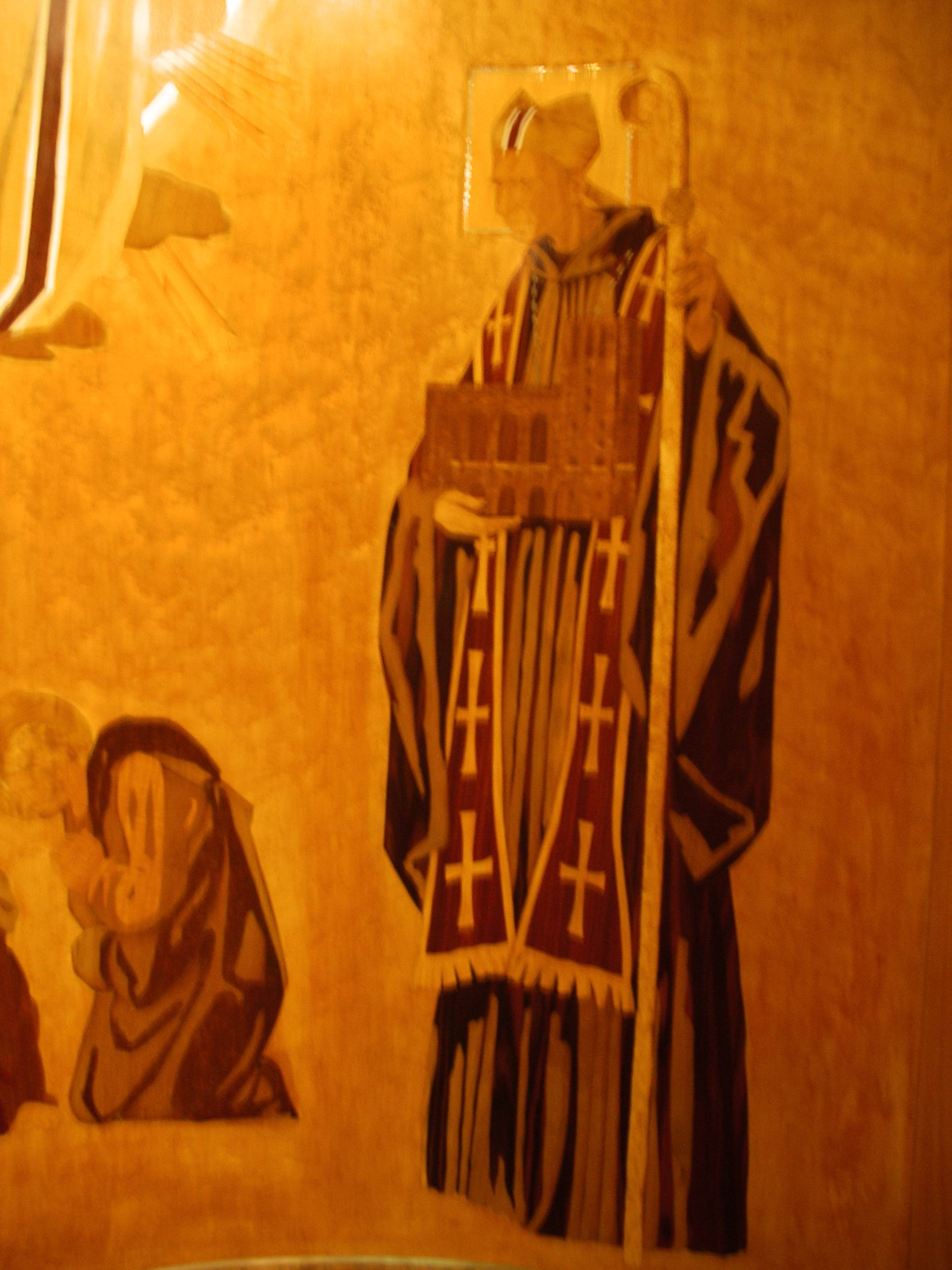
Marqueterie depicting Oliba

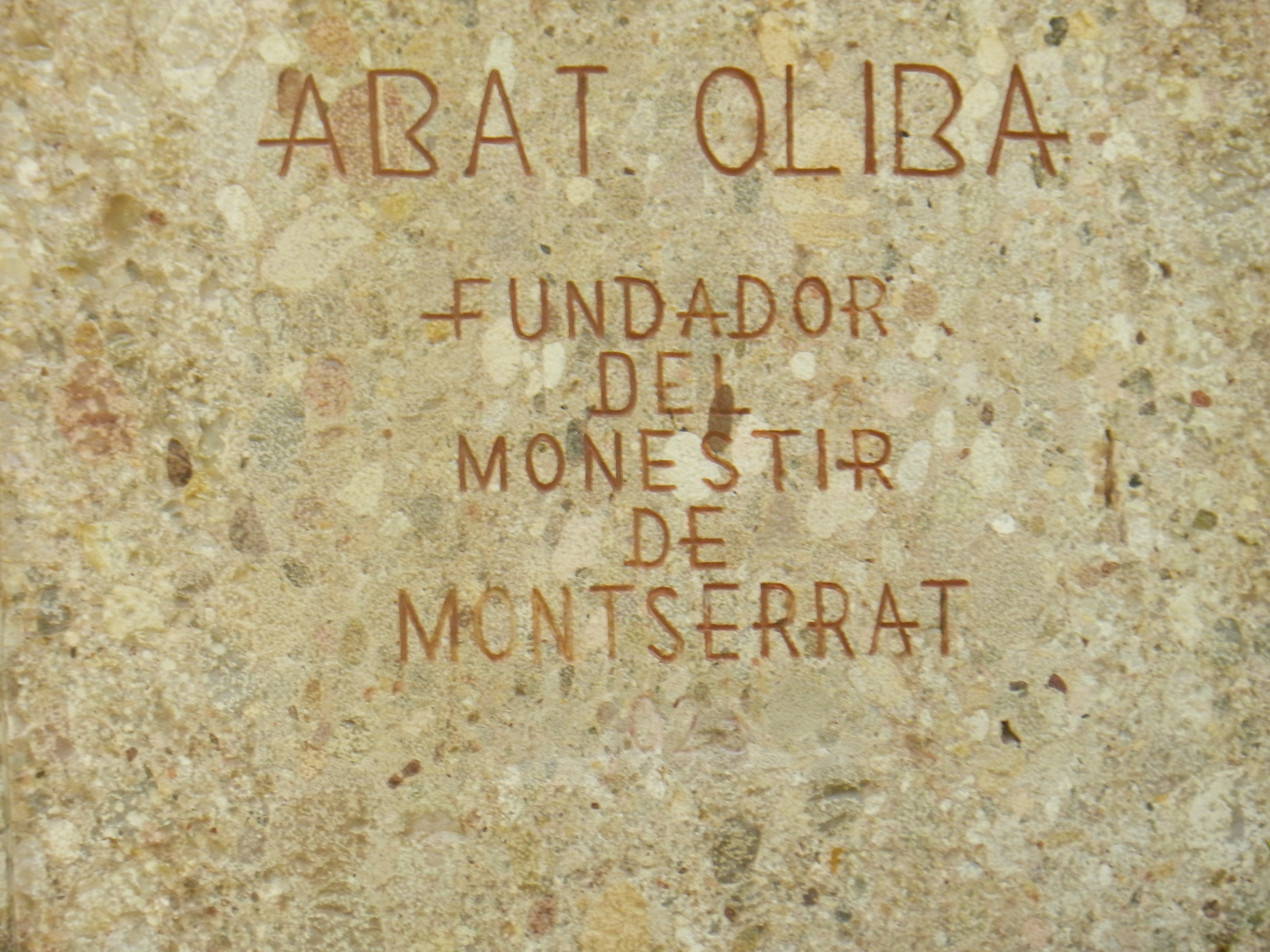
Abbot Oliba founder of Santa Maria de Montserrat Abbey

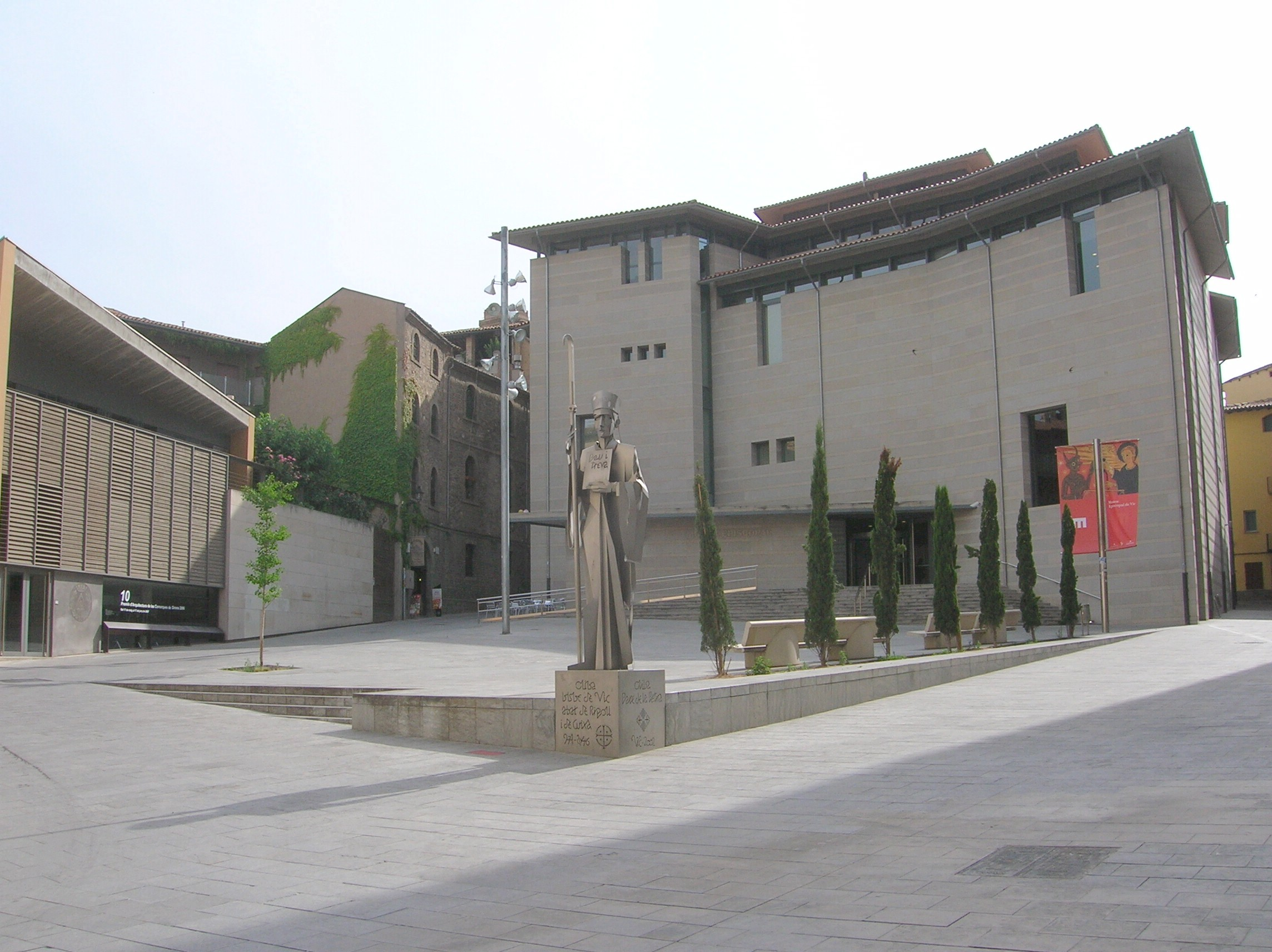
Monument of Oliba at Vic

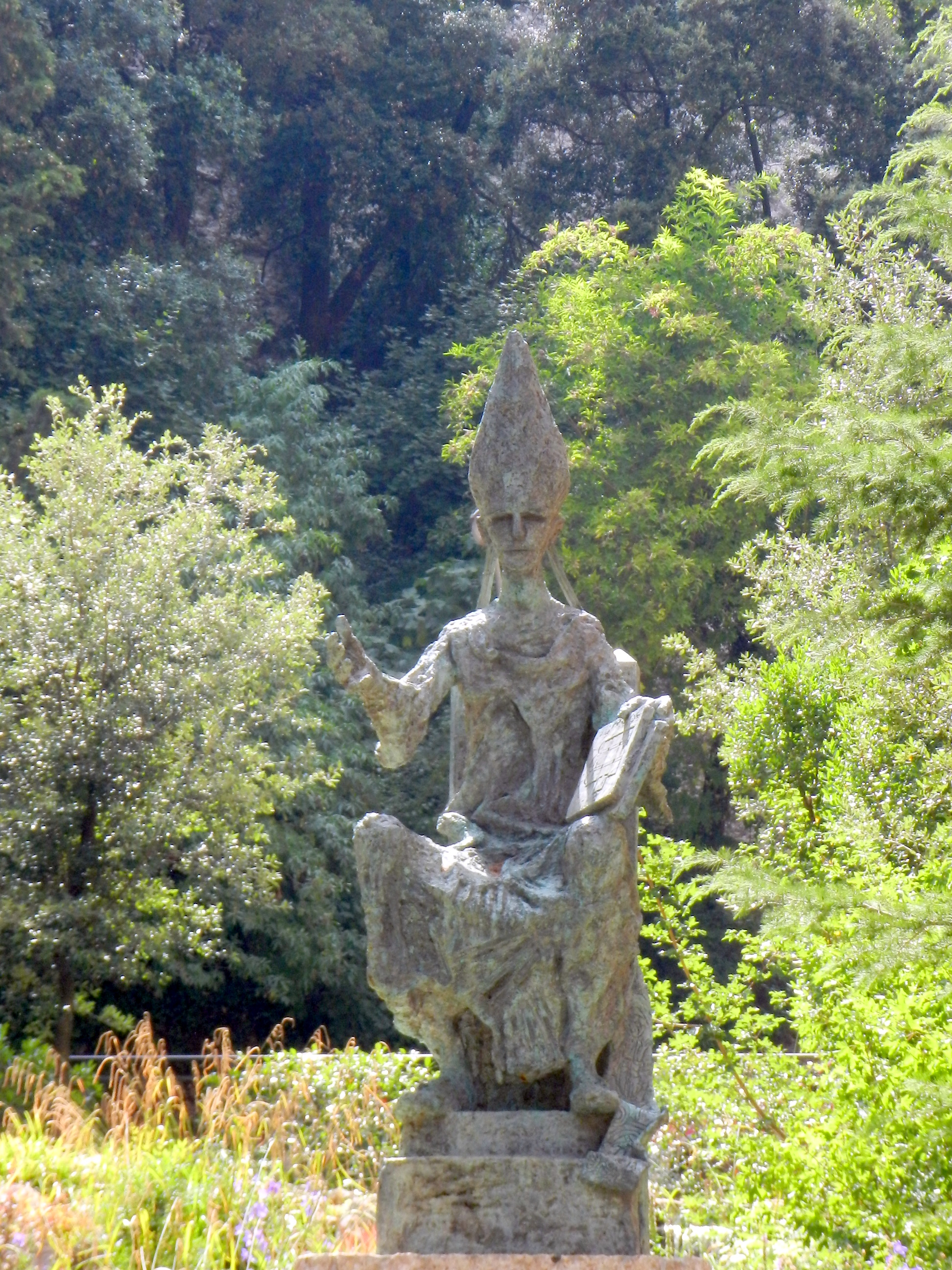
Statue of Oliba at Montserrat

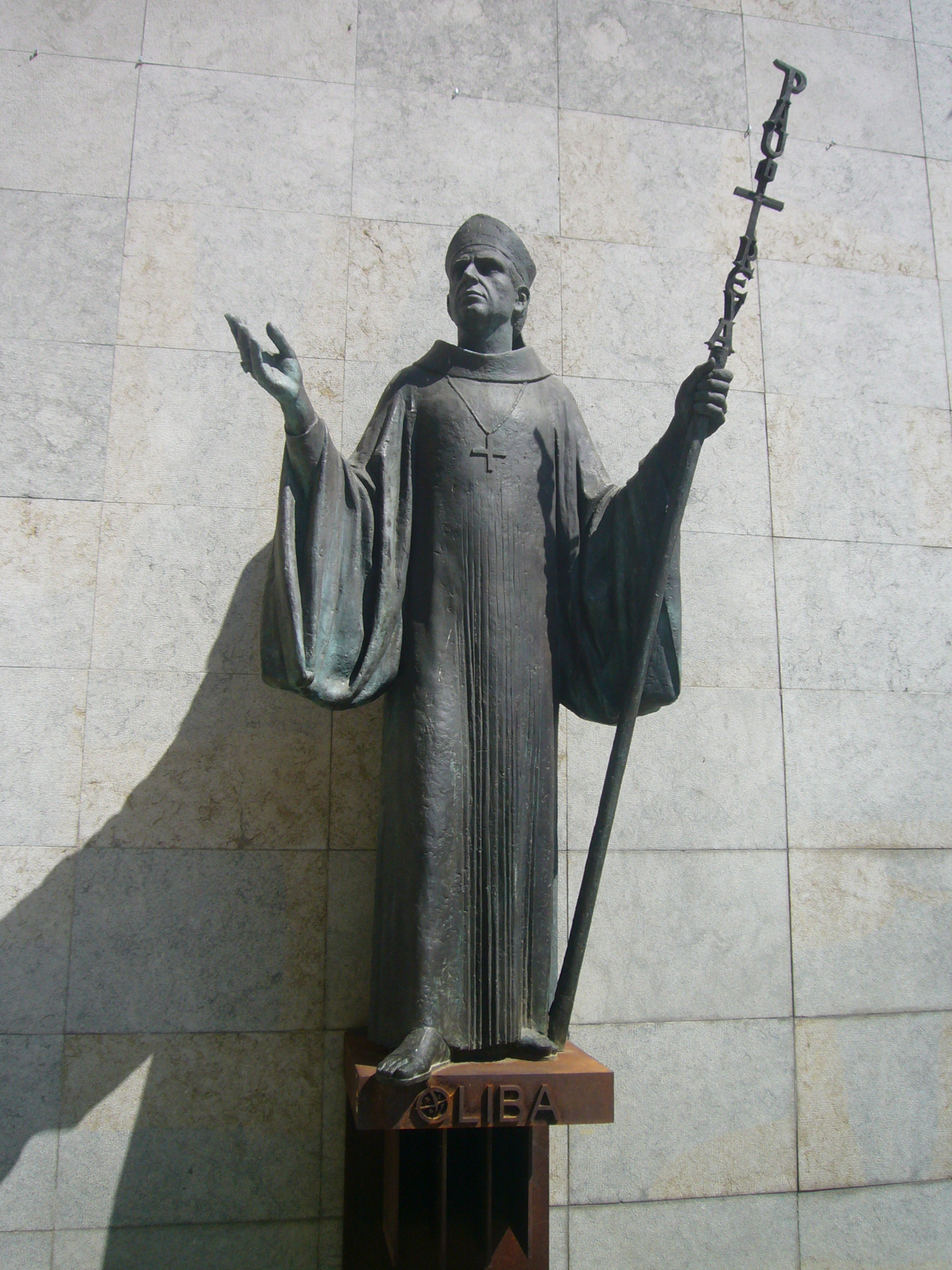
Statue of Oliba at the main gate of Ripoll monastery

== Sources ==
- Menéndez Pidal, Ramón. The Cid and his Spain. 1929.
- Amado, Ramon Ruiz (1913). "Diocese of Vich" . In Herbermann, Charles (ed.). Catholic Encyclopedia. New York: Robert Appleton Company.

Preceded by none	Count of Berga; 988-1003	Succeeded by Wilfred
