= Casteil =

Casteil Castell de Vernet
- Commune
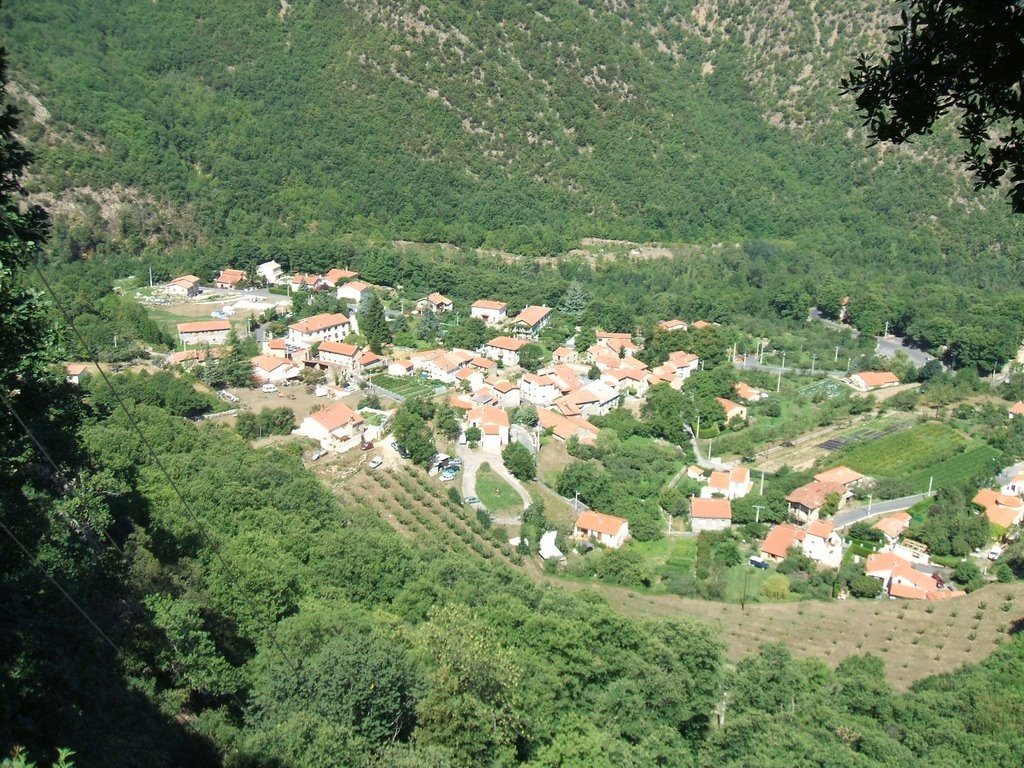
- Casteil seen from the access road to the Abbey of Saint-Martin du Canigou

- Coat of arms
- Location of Casteil
- Location within France Location within Occitanie
- Coordinates: 42°31′55″N 2°23′39″E
- Country: France
- Region: Occitania
- Department: Pyrénées-Orientales
- Arrondissement: Prades
- Canton: Le Canigou
- Intercommunality: Conflent-Canigó

Government
  - Mayor (2020–2026): Olivier Chauveau
- Area^{1}: 29.83 km^{2} (11.52 sq mi)
- Elevation: 750 m (2,460 ft)
- Highest elevation: 2,721 m (8,927 ft)
- Lowest elevation: 697 m (2,287 ft)
- Population (2023): 139
  - Density: 4.66/km^{2} (12.1/sq mi)
- Time zone: UTC+01:00 (CET)
  - Summer (DST): UTC+02:00 (CEST)
- INSEE/Postal code: 66043 /66820
- ^{1} French Land Register data, which excludes lakes, ponds, glaciers > 1 km^{2} (0.386 sq mi or 247 acres) and river estuaries.

Casteil (French pronunciation: [kastɛj]; Catalan: Castell de Vernet) is a commune in the Pyrénées-Orientales department in southern France, part of the historical Conflent comarca. The abbey Martin-du-Canigou is located above Casteil.

== Geography ==
=== Localisation ===
Casteil is located in the canton of Le Canigou and in the arrondissement of Prades.

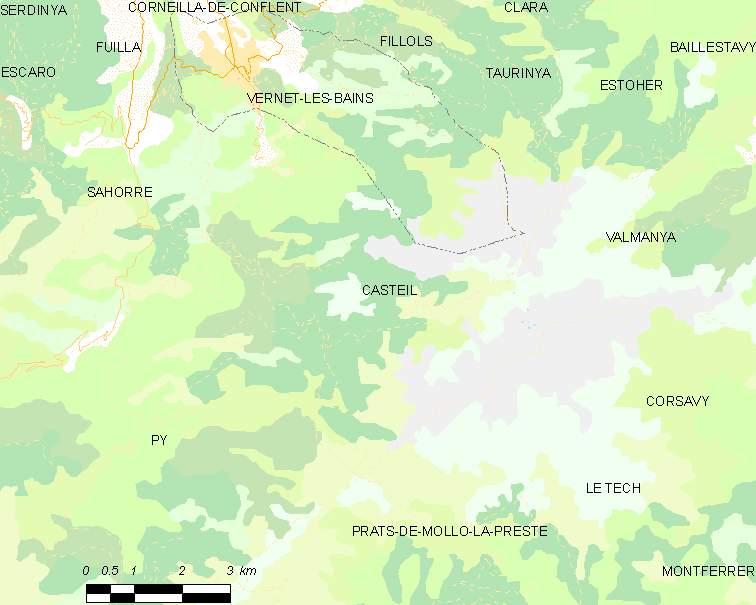
Map of Casteil and its surrounding communes

== Population ==
Historical population
Year	Pop.	±% p.a.
1968	59	—
1975	50	−2.34%
1982	52	+0.56%
1990	102	+8.79%
1999	130	+2.73%
2007	125	−0.49%
2012	129	+0.63%
2017	136	+1.06%
2023	139	+0.36%
Source: INSEE

== See also ==
- Communes of the Pyrénées-Orientales department
- Martin-du-Canigou
