= Sant Serni de Llanera (Torà) =

- Locality
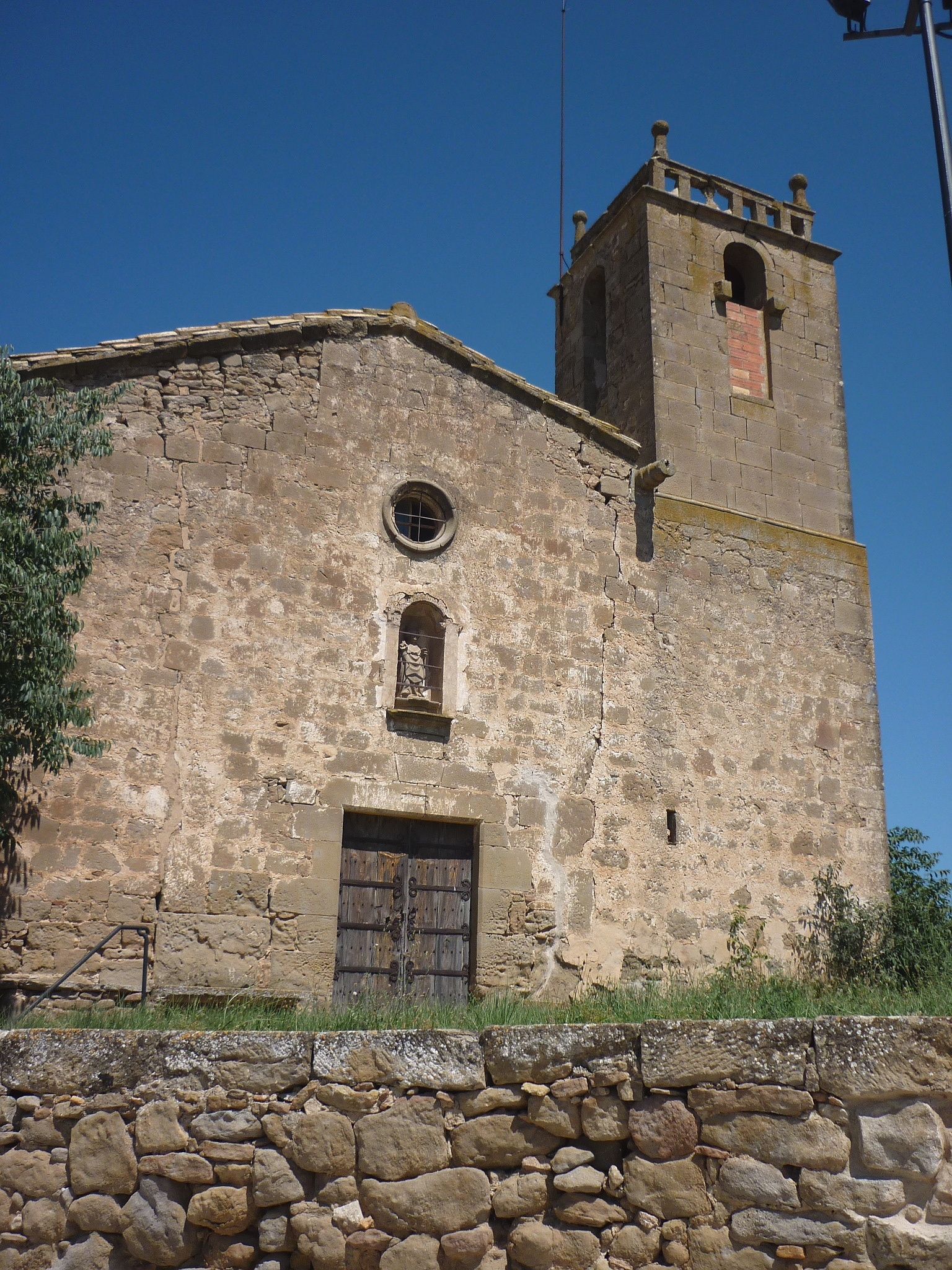

- Location within Province of Lleida Location within Catalonia Location within Spain
- Coordinates: 41°50′35″N 1°27′57″E
- Country: Spain
- Community: Catalonia
- Province: Lleida
- Municipality: Torà
- Elevation: 606 m (1,988 ft)

Population
  - Total: 19

Sant Serni de Llanera is a locality located in the municipality of Torà, in Province of Lleida province, Catalonia, Spain. As of 2020, it has a population of 19.

== Geography ==
Sant Serni de Llanera is located 97km east-northeast of Lleida.
