= Albesa =

- Municipality
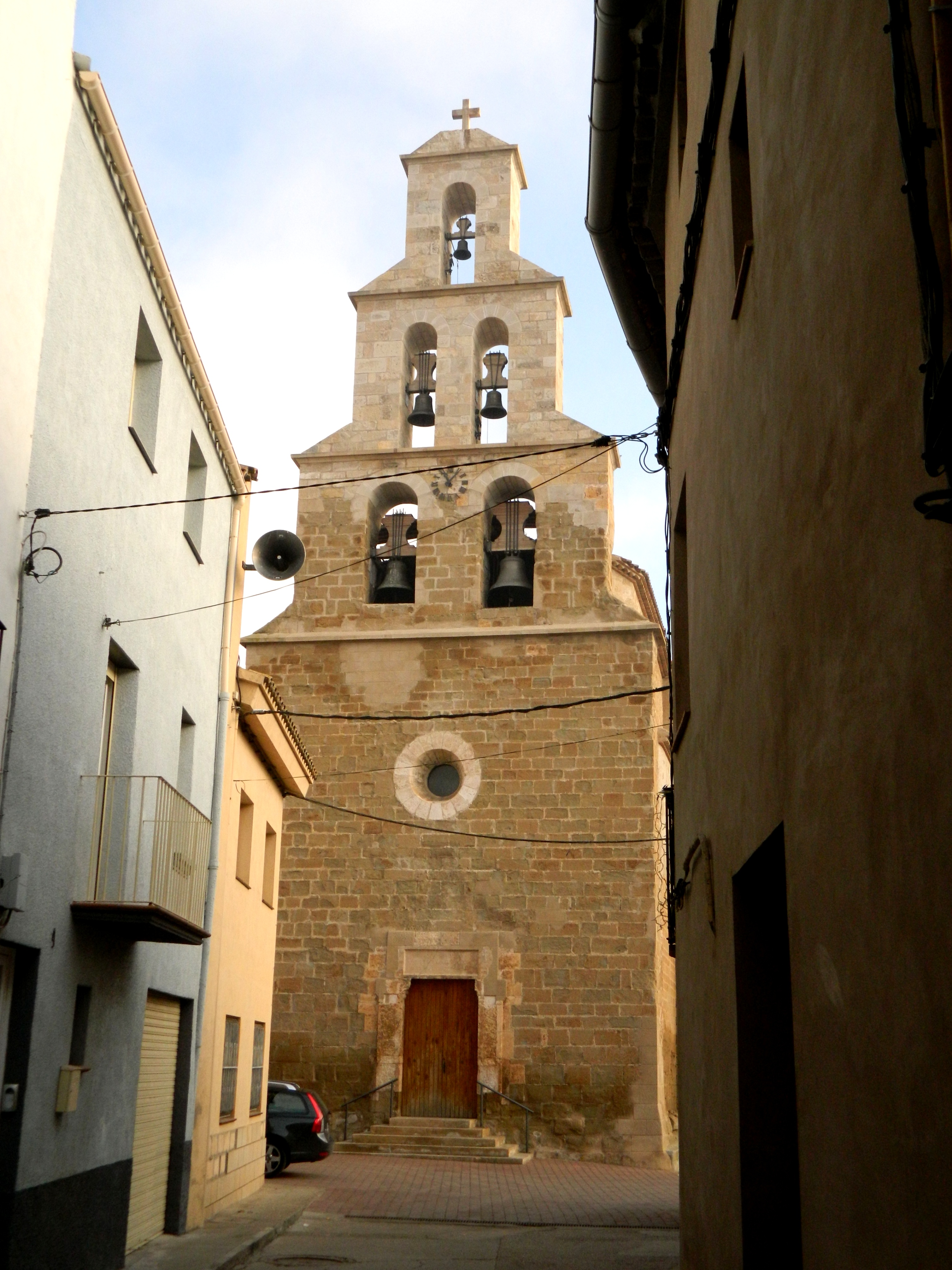
- Church of the Assumption, Albesa

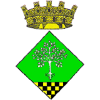
- Flag Coat of arms

- Location in Catalonia
- Coordinates: 41°45′14″N 0°39′42″E
- Country: Spain
- Community: Catalonia
- Province: Lleida
- Comarca: Noguera

Government
  - Mayor: Eugènia Puig-Gròs i Clua (AETS-AM) (2019)

Area
  - Total: 37.6 km^{2} (14.5 sq mi)
- Elevation: 314 m (1,030 ft)

Population (2025-01-01)
  - Total: 1,584
  - Density: 42.1/km^{2} (109/sq mi)
- Demonym: Albesans
- Postal code: 25135
- Website: www.albesa.cat

Albesa (Catalan pronunciation: [alˈβeza]) is a municipality in the comarca of Noguera, in the province of Lleida, Catalonia, Spain. It has a population of 1,584 (register office, 2025).

In 1003 it was the seat of the battle of Albesa. The economy is mostly based on agriculture (fruit, potato, tomato), taking advantage of the presence of an acequia. Sights include the parish church of St. Mary (18th century), with a 14th-century retablo, and the remains of the ancient castle (conquered by the Christians in 1098) and of several ancient Roman villas.

== Notable natives ==
- Fred Albesa, Commander, United States Navy.
- Ignasi Segarra i Banyeres, priest of Opus Dei prelature.
- Fermí Palau i Casellas, teacher, politician and poet.
