= William II Jordan =

Count

William II Jordan (Catalan: Guillem Jordà; Occitan: Guilhèm Jordan) (died 1109) was the count of Berga beginning in 1094, the count of Cerdanya beginning in 1095, and regent of the County of Tripoli beginning in 1105.

== Biography ==
He was the son of Count William I of Cerdanya and Sança, daughter of Count Ramon Berenguer I of Barcelona.

William accompanied the army of Raymond IV of Toulouse, one of the leaders of the First Crusade, to the Holy Land. Raymond died in the east in 1105, leaving his young son Alfonso-Jordan as lord of Mons Peregrinus and Tortosa (of Syria) and nominal Count of Tripoli (which had not yet been captured by the crusaders). Since Alfonso-Jordan was still a child, Raymond's soldiers chose William-Jordan as regent.

Meanwhile, in Toulouse, Raymond's elder son Bertrand was ruling in his absence. After Raymond's death the barons of Toulouse chose Alfonso-Jordan to replace Bertrand, who, now overthrown, travelled to the east, arriving at Mons Peregrinus in 1108 to claim it for himself. There, he quarrelled with William II Jordan over the inheritance of the Raymond's lordship, and over the regency of still-unconquered Tripoli.

William allied himself with Prince Tancred of Galilee, at the time regent of the Principality of Antioch, while Bertrand asked King Baldwin I of Jerusalem to intervene. Baldwin I, Baldwin of Bourcq, and Joscelin of Courtenay allied with Bertrand and William and Tancred were forced to compromise. Tancred was forced to give up his claim to the County of Edessa (but was allowed to keep Antioch); William and Bertrand divided Tripoli between them, recognizing Tancred and Baldwin I as their respective overlords.

With the dispute settled, the crusader armies marched on Tripoli and besieged it, with assistance from the Genoese fleet. On July 12, 1109, they captured the city. A short time later William died of an arrow wound sustained during the siege, and the county passed to Bertrand alone.

Preceded by William I	Count of Berga; 1094–1109	Succeeded by Bernard
Preceded by William I	Count of Cerdagne; 1095–1109	Succeeded by Bernard
