= Guillem Guifredo =

Guillem Guifredo (William Wifred) was a bishop from 1041 until 1075. in Urgell, Northern Spain.

His father was Wifred II, Count of Cerdanya. Very little is known of his episcopate but he is known to have attended the Council of Narbonne in 1043.
