= Claret cup =

Claret cup may refer to:

== Plants ==
- Echinocereus triglochidiatus, a cactus species that goes by the common name claret-cup cactus
- Echinocereus coccineus, sometimes called Mexican claret cup
- Magnolia sprengeri, sometimes called claret-cup magnolia
- Claret cup irises, cultivars of Iris sibirica
- Claret cup fuchsia, a cultivated variety with large semidouble flowers and a trailing habit

== Drinking ==
- Claret cup (beverage), a wine cocktail popular in the 19th century
- a cup of claret, a kind of Bordeaux wine, sometimes served in specialized claret glasses
