= Battle of Albesa =

- Part of the Reconquista
- Map of Spain in 1003
Date	1003
Location	Al-Qaṣr al-Māša (Albesa), Lleida 41°45′14″N 0°39′42″W
Result	Córdoban victory

Belligerents
County of Barcelona; County of Urgell	Emirate of Córdoba

Commanders and leaders
Raymond Borell; Ermengol I of Urgell	Abd al-Malik al-Muzaffar

The Battle of Albesa was a follow-up to the Battle of Torà that took place 25 February 1003 at Al-Qaṣr al-Māša (Albesa), near Balagî (Balaguer), between the united Christian forces of the Catalan counties and the Islamic forces of the Caliphate of Córdoba.

== Background ==
It was one of the border skirmishes associated with the interminable razzias of the Reconquista, described as "a simple encounter between local forces" and "a local action without overarching importance", though both these views are called into question by the assemblage of important Catalan nobles at the battle and the Muslim reprisal which followed.

Berengar, the Bishop of Elna, was killed in the battle. His death is recorded in the Chronicon Rivipullense. The brief notice in the Chronicon Rotense reads: 1003. Factum est proelium Albesae cum sarracenis ("the battle of Albesa is made with the Saracens").
In the Alterum chronicon Rotense, more detail is given: Anno MIII. Factum est proelium in Albesa cum sarracenis ubi Berengarius Episcopus Elensis perimitur ("Year 1003. battle is made in Albesa with the Saracens, where Berengar, Bishop of Elna, was killed").

The date of 25 February 1003 comes from the only Arabic source to mention the battle, Ibn al-Faraḍī, who records that Sa‘īd bin Mūsā of Elvira "died in the battle of al-Māša near Balagî the Thursday ten days before the end of the month of Rabī’ al-Thānī in the year 393", that is of the Islamic calendar, being 25 February 1003 in the Anno Domini system. Évariste Lévi-Provençal, the French Orientalist, believed it took place on 27 February, since the Islamic day (20 Rabī’) began at sunset, though 27 February 1003 was not a Thursday.

Félix Hernández Jiménez dated the battle of Albesa to the summer of 1003 because he connected it with the seizure of the castle of Castellolí—mentioned only in one Christian source—by Abd al-Malik al-Muzaffar, the Córdoban hajib. The Bayān al-Mugrib of Ibn Iḍārī records how Abd al-Malik was marching through lightly populated country toward Barcelona on first of Shawwal (3 August), and that sometime after this date he camped at al-Baṭḥā (possibly Albesa). Abd al-Malik proceeded to invade Urgell and raze the castles of Montmagastre and Meià. He may also have ravaged the territory of Manresa. At the end of this campaign, when he sent his vassals home, Abd al-Malik had captured 5,570 Christians and six of their castles. He had also destroyed 85 fortified places.

In this expedition, according to Ibn Khaldūn (in a part of his chronicle based on Ibn Ḥayyān), Ermengol I of Urgell, who had initially rebelled, surrendered and was taken captive:

Su hijo Ramon (Raymund) gobernó Barcelona y su hermano Ermengol (Armanqūd) sus fronteras. Luego Ermengol se sublevó contra ‘Abd al-Malik bin al-Manṣūr, quien le combatió y le capturó en sus fronteras, después de haber capitulado.	His [Borrell II's] son Raymond [Borrel] governed Barcelona and his brother Ermengol its frontiers. Then Ermengol was in rebellion against ‘Abd al-Malik bin al-Manṣūr, who battled him and captured him in the marches, after having surrendered.

His capture is connected sometimes with the battle of Albesa, and sometimes not. Ermengol was back in Urgell by 13 March 1004.

A new bishop is recorded in Elna, in the records of the diocesan cartulary, on 11 October, a certain Frèdol. It is doubtful whether a new bishop could have been elected so fast if Berengar had died at the end of summer at a long distance from Elna, taking into account the time necessary for both news to travel and an election to be held and new bishop installed. The earlier date (February) coincides better with the timing of Berengar's death, which occurred at Albesa more certainly than Ermengol's capture.

The presence of Berengar at the battle suggest that of his brothers, Bernard I of Besalú and Wifred II of Cerdagne, also. According to the Crónica d'Alaó renovada, count Isarn of Ribagorza died fighting the Moors at Monzón in 1003. This suggests an offensive action far into Muslim territory, making it possible that he died at the battle of Albesa. Geography lends support to his presence, and that of Sunyer of Pallars, at Albesa. Probably all these had gone to aid Ermengol and his brother, Raymond Borrel of Barcelona, in their revolt.

The marginality of al-Faraḍī's mention of the battle and the general accuracy of the history of Ibn Khaldūn (his source, Ibn Ḥayyān, was a contemporary), suggest that the battle of Albesa was a separate event from the capture of Ermengol, which took place on Abd al-Malik's punitive expedition against the Catalan counties. Mahmud Ali Makki, the modern editor and interpreter of the Arabic poet Ibn Darrāȳ al-Qasṭallī, suggests that his poem 122 treats the expedition of Abd al-Malik as a response to certain Catalan penetrations of caliphal territory after the death of Almanzor. This accords well with the date of 25 February and with the dating of Abd al-Malik's campaign to the summer.

The battle of Albesa was one of the incursions which prompted the latter. According to Carl Erdmann, the Muslims, after their defeat at Torà, retreated into their own territory, where the Christians followed them. A second battle was fought near Albesa, which was the end of the brief war, and possibly the campaigning season. The result of the battle is uncertain, but unlike the first battle was not favourable to the Christians. Albesa was first considered a Christian victory by Gerónimo Zurita.
