= Clarete =

Clarete may refer to:

- Julia Clarete (born 1979), a Filipina entertainer
- Clarete (wine), a Spanish wine similar to rosé

== See also ==
- Claret (disambiguation)
- Clarette
