= Counts of Berga =

Feudal lords of the Catalan county of Berga (988–1199)

The counts of Berga were the feudal lords of Berga, one of the Catalan counties created out of Besalú in 988 for a younger son of Oliba Cabreta. The viscounts of Berga ruled the city in name during the rule of the counts of Besalú from the early tenth century.

== Counts ==
- Oliba (988-1002)
- Wilfred (1002-1035)
- Bernard I (1035-1050)
- Berengar (1050)
- Raymond (1050-1068)
- William I (1068-1094)
- William II (1094-1109) co-reigning with
- Bernard II (1094-1117)

To the counts of Barcelona.

== Viscounts ==
- Brandai (905-?)
- Onofred (c.950)
- Bardina (1003-1017)
- Dalmau I (1017-1067)
- Bernat Dalmau (1067-1086)
- Dalmau II Bernat (1086-1113)
- Guisla (1113-?)
- William I (?-1183)
- William II (1183-1196)
- Berengar (1196-1199)
- Raymond (1199)

Sold to Peter II of Aragón.
