= Berengar of Berga =

11th century Bishop and count

Berengar (Catalan: Berenguer Guifré) (died 1093), the third son of Wilfred II of Cerdanya and Guisla, was the count of Berga from the death of his brother Bernard I in 1050 until he renounced the county later the same year to become bishop of Girona, a position that he held for over 40 years, from 1052 until he died in 1093.

He defended the rights of the Church against Hugh II, Count of Empúries and contributed to the triumph of the reforms of Pope Gregory VII. In one of his letters to the abbot of Augsburg, he stated that the people of Girona celebrated the feast of Sant Narcís on 29 October 1087.

Preceded by Bernard I	Count of Berga; 1050	Succeeded by Raymond
