= Bernard, Count of Cerdanya =

Count of Berga and Count of Cerdanya

Bernard William
- Count of Berga, Count of Cerdanya
- Coat of arms: Arms of Cerdanya
- Tenure: (1094-1117) (1109-1117)
- Predecessor: William I of Cerdanya; William II of Cerdanya
- Successor: Ramon Berenguer III of Barcelona
- Native name: Bernat Guillem
- Born: c. 11th cent.
- Died: 1117
- Father: William Raymond
- Mother: Sancha of Barcelona

Bernard William (Catalan: Bernat Guillem; Occitan: Bernat Guilhem) (c. 11th cent.-1117) was the Count of Berga (as Bernard II, 1094-1117) and the Count of Cerdanya (1109-1117).

A son of William I of Cerdanya and Sancha of Barcelona, he inherited Berga from his father in 1094. On the death of his brother William-Jordan in 1109, he inherited Cerdanya. In 1111, after the death of Bernard III of Besalú, he opposed the integration of Besalú into the County of Barcelona as it was technically a feudatory of Cerdanya, as were Fenollet and Vallespir. However, he eventually agreed to abdicate these counties to his cousin and friend Raymond Berengar III of Barcelona. When he himself died seven years later without heirs, Cerdanya passed to Barcelona.

Preceded by William I	Count of Berga; 1094–1117	Succeeded by Raymond Berengar I
Preceded by William II	Count of Cerdanya and Conflent; 1109–1117	Succeeded by Raymond Berengar I
