= Claret (surname) =

Claret is a surname. Notable people with the surname include:

- Arcadie Claret (1826–1897), mistress of King Leopold I of Belgium
- Antonio María Claret y Clará (St. Anthony Mary Claret), 19th-century Spanish Roman Catholic archbishop.
- Chantal Claret (born 1982), lead singer for the power pop band Morningwood
- Emmanuelle Claret (1968–2013), French biathlete
- Julia Clarete (born 1979), Filipino actress-singer
