= Abbey of Saint-Martin-du-Canigou =

Monastery in southern France

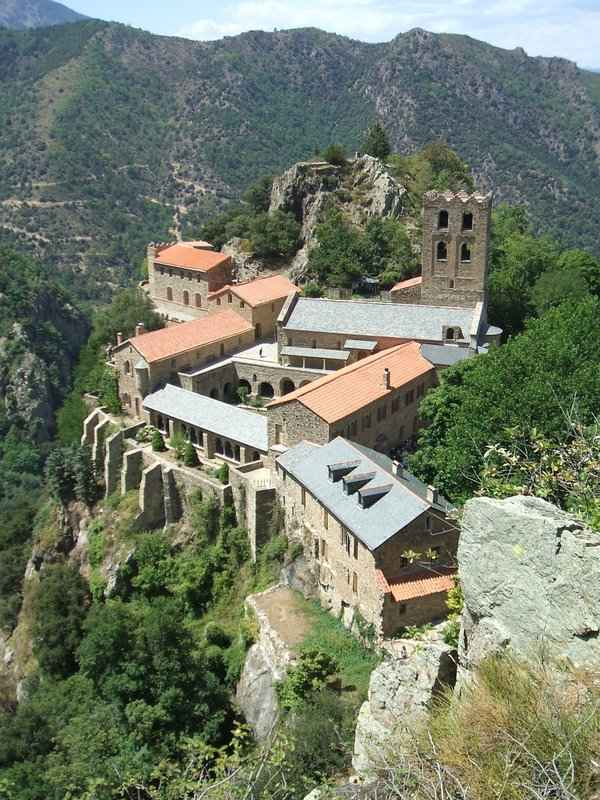
- Saint-Martin-du-Canigou

- Location within France

Religion
- Affiliation: Roman Catholic
- Diocese: Prades
- Region: Languedoc-Roussillon
- Ecclesiastical or organisational status: Monastery
- Status: Active

Location
- Location: near Casteil, Prades, Pyrénées-Orientales, Languedoc-Roussillon region, France
- Municipality: Casteil
- State: Pyrénées-Orientales
- Coordinates: 42.528144°N 2.400892°E

Architecture
- Type: Abbey church
- Style: Romanesque
- Groundbreaking: 1005
- Completed: 1009
- Designated as NHL: Monument historique (1889)

Website
- https://stmartinducanigou.org/

The abbey of Saint-Martin-du-Canigou (Catalan: Abadia de Sant Martí del Canigó) is a monastery built in 1009 in the Pyrenees of Northern Catalonia on Canigó mountain in present-day southern France near the Spanish border.

Pau Casals wrote a composition entitled "Sant Martí del Canigó" for Orchestra.

== Location ==
The monastery is located on the territory of the commune of Casteil, in the Pyrénées-Orientales département.

== History ==
The original Romanesque style monastery was built from 1005 to 1009 by Guifred II, Count of Cerdanya (Fr. Cerdagne), in atonement for the murder of his son and was populated by Benedictine monks.

In 1050, Guifred II died at the monastery he had built after having become a monk there 15 years before. In 1051 a messenger set forth to visit religious houses throughout Europe to solicit prayers for Guifred. He brought a parchment, a mortuary roll, upon which at each stop were added words of prayer and respect. This parchment has survived and scholars (including Léopold Delisle with his Rouleaux des Morts du IX au XV Siecle of 1866) have used it to discover differences in culture between northern and southern Europe in a single given year. Some of the discoveries from this important document include that southern culture was more staid and bound by custom while the northern culture more free form and experimental in their writing styles, use of words and grammar.

The monastery was damaged in the Catalan earthquake of 1428.

The monastery was secularized in 1782 by Louis XVI. The monastery was abandoned by the monks in 1783-1785 and fell into disrepair.

During Reign of Terror in the years 1793-1794, the abbey was closed, and its contents scattered. The buildings were then transformed into a stone quarry for nearby residents, the capitals of the cloister were looted, as well as sculptures and furniture.

In 1902, the bishop of Elne and Perpignan, because of his Catalan background, began to restore the ruins radically, work that was completed in 1932. Today it is occupied by the Catholic Community of the Beatitudes.

== Buildings ==
The abbey consists of two churches in the First Romanesque style; the lower church, dedicated to St. Mary, and the upper, dedicated to St. Martin. This building is indexed in the Base Mérimée, a database of architectural heritage maintained by the French Ministry of Culture, under the reference PA00103981.

- The lower church is predominantly black, and vault height rarely exceeds 3 meters. The eastern part (apses and adjacent bay) probably dates back to the consecration of 1009, while the rest of the building dates from the years 1010–1020, in conjunction with work after acquiring the relics of St. Ganders and new consecration of the church.
- The upper church was built between the years 1010-1020 (at the same time as the expansion of the lower church). Its construction required the strengthening of the columns of the lower church, which were enclosed in square piles. Similar to the lower church, the Saint-Martin church is composed of three naves separated by monolithic columns and barrel vaulted semicircular (except between the third and fourth bay, where the pair of support is cruciform in shape and arch supports).
- The gatehouse is no longer than 19 meters after being damaged in the 1428 earthquake. It was never fully restored.

The rest of the convent buildings date from the early 20th century.

=== The cloister ===
Since the restorations of 1900-1920 it is difficult to imagine the original appearance of the cloister. The cloister once had two levels, the first built in the early 11th century and the second to the late 12th century. The lower level, which showed vaulted galleries and semicircular arches was bare of any decoration. Nowadays, there remain only three galleries that have been heavily restored, lacking their original character. The upper level, had marble capitals, which were scattered after the closure of the monastery during the French Revolution. The restoration recovered some, which were incorporated in the new southern gallery.

=== Gallery ===
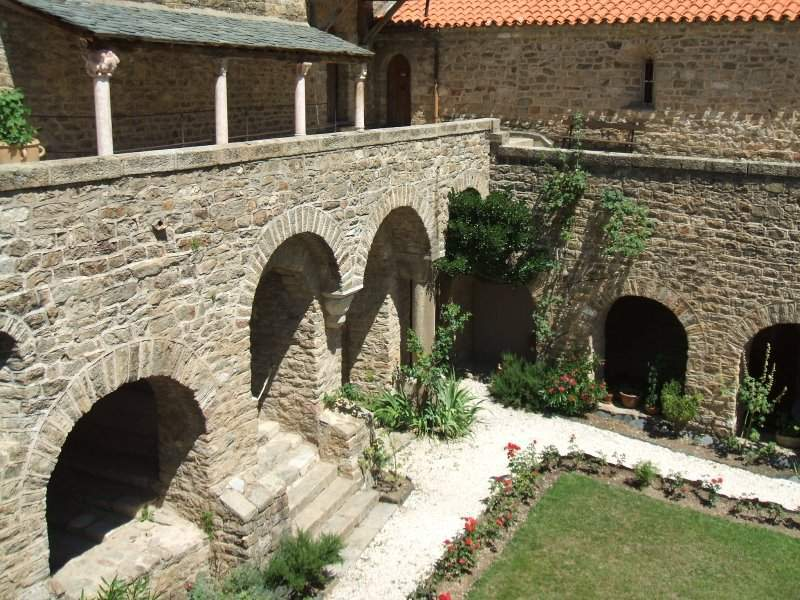
Northern and eastern galleries (2006)

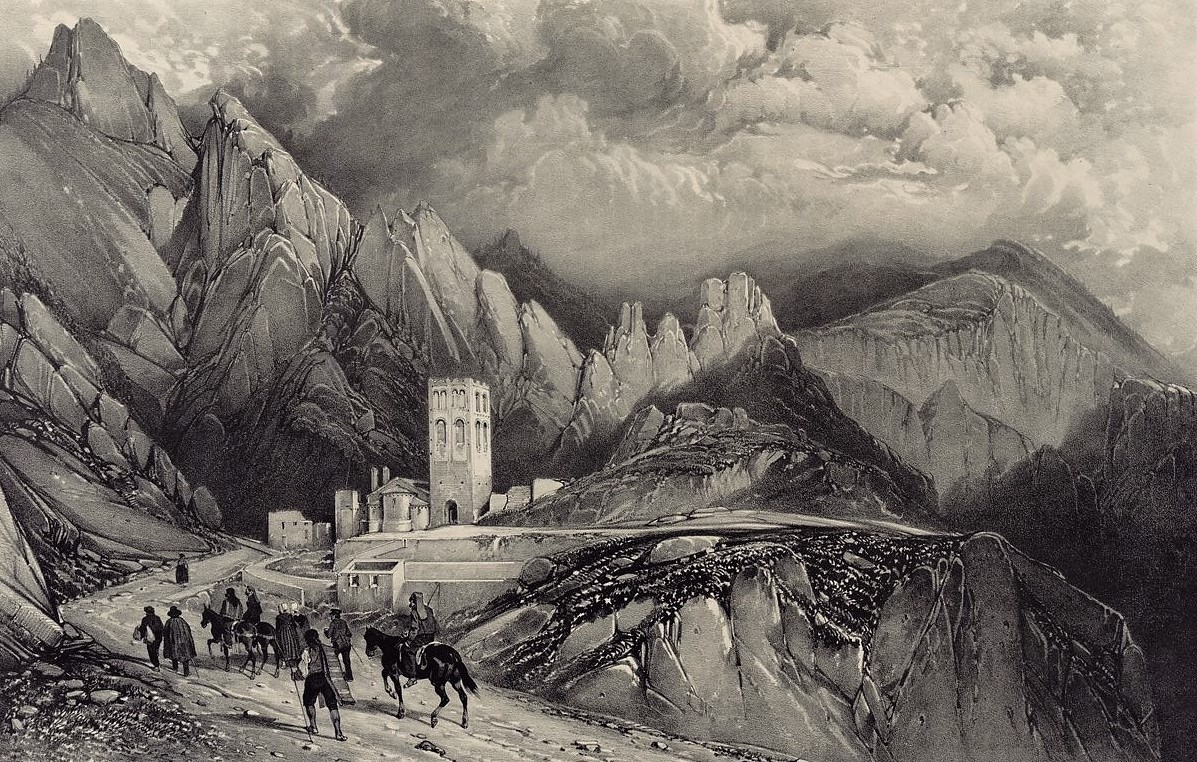
Abbey of Saint Martin du Canigou by A. Mayer (1837)

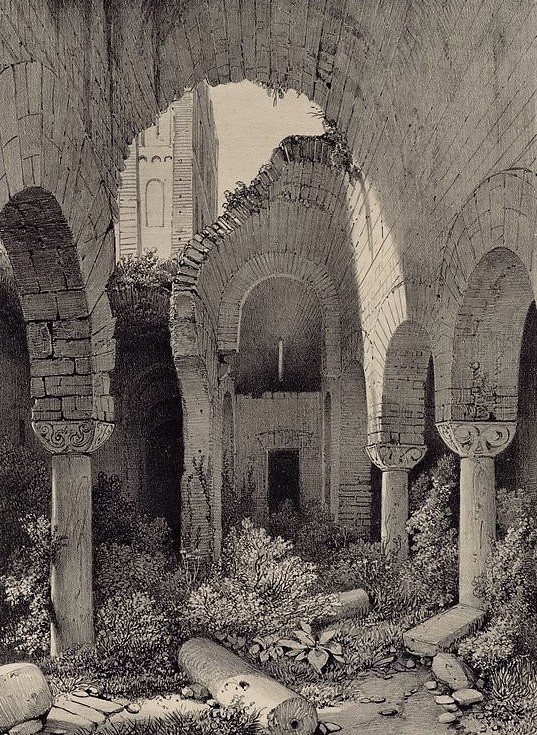
Abbey Church of St Martin de Canigou (1837)

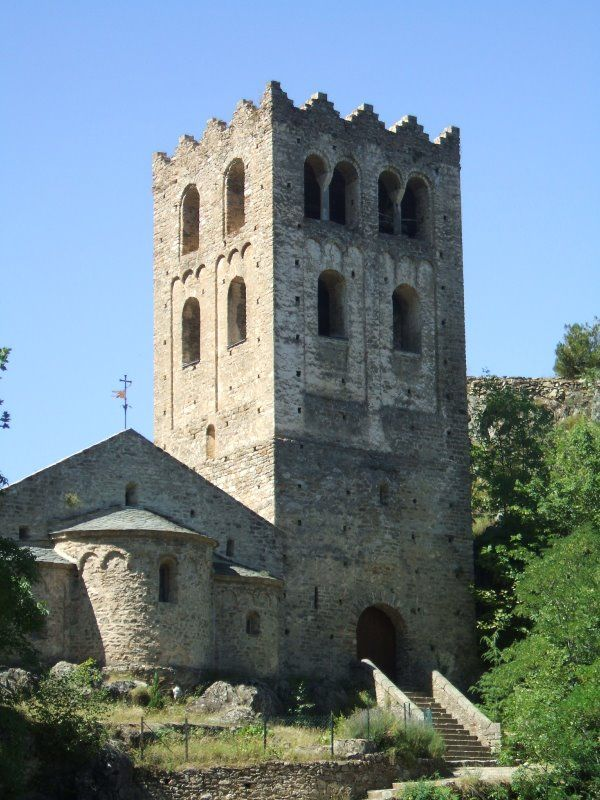
Tower-porch and apse of the abbey (2006)

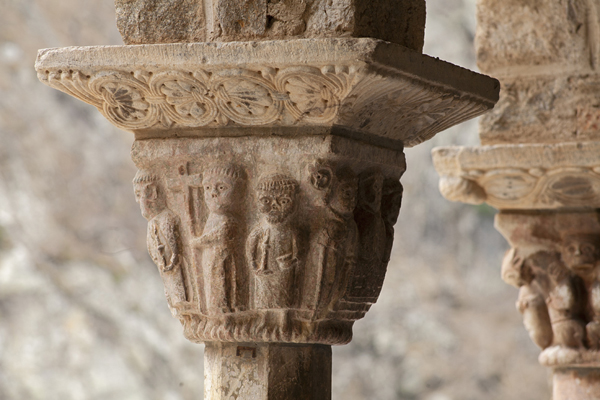
Decorated pillar (2010)

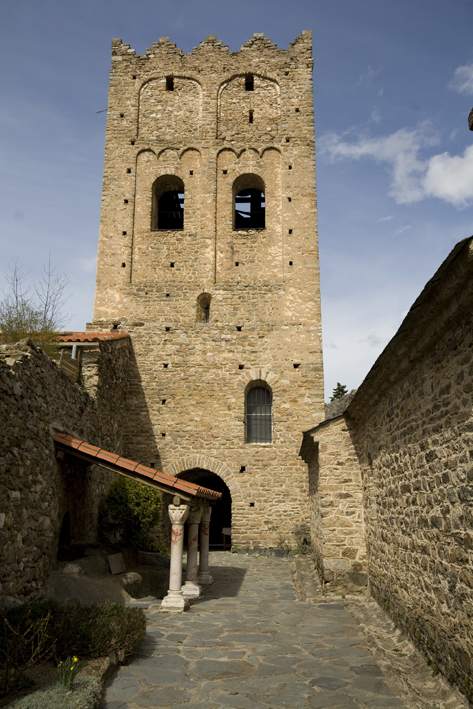
Tower (2010)

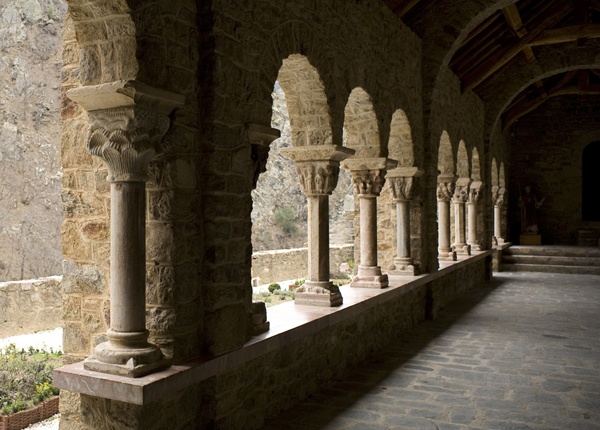
Cloisters (2010)

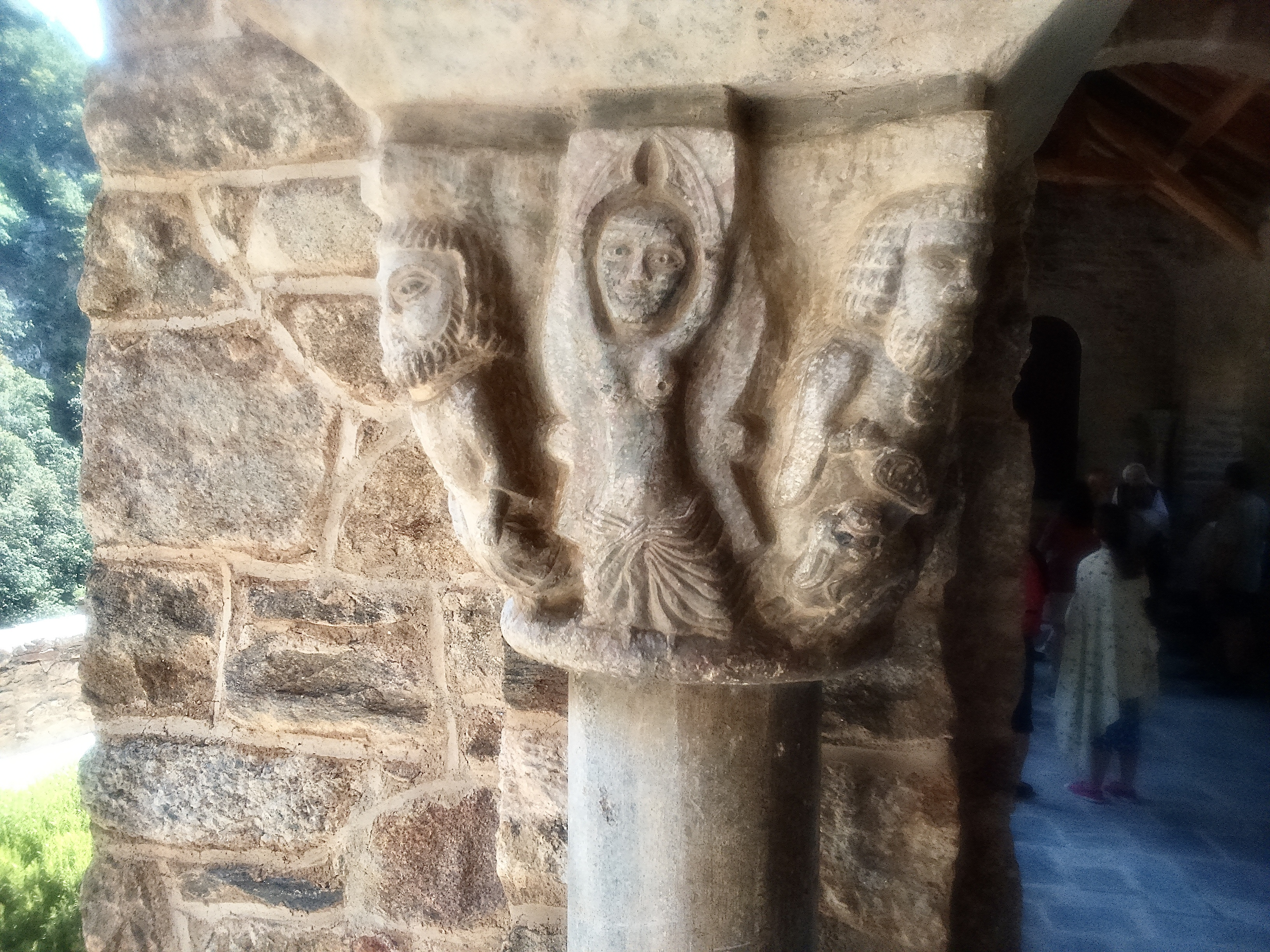
Decorated capital, figures (2015)

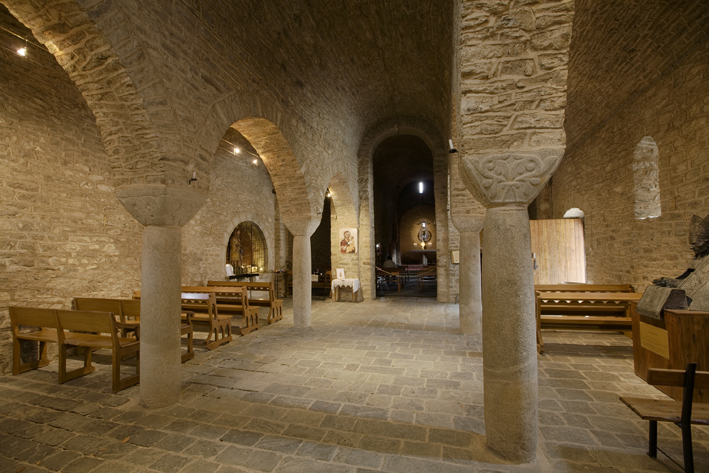
Interior (2010)

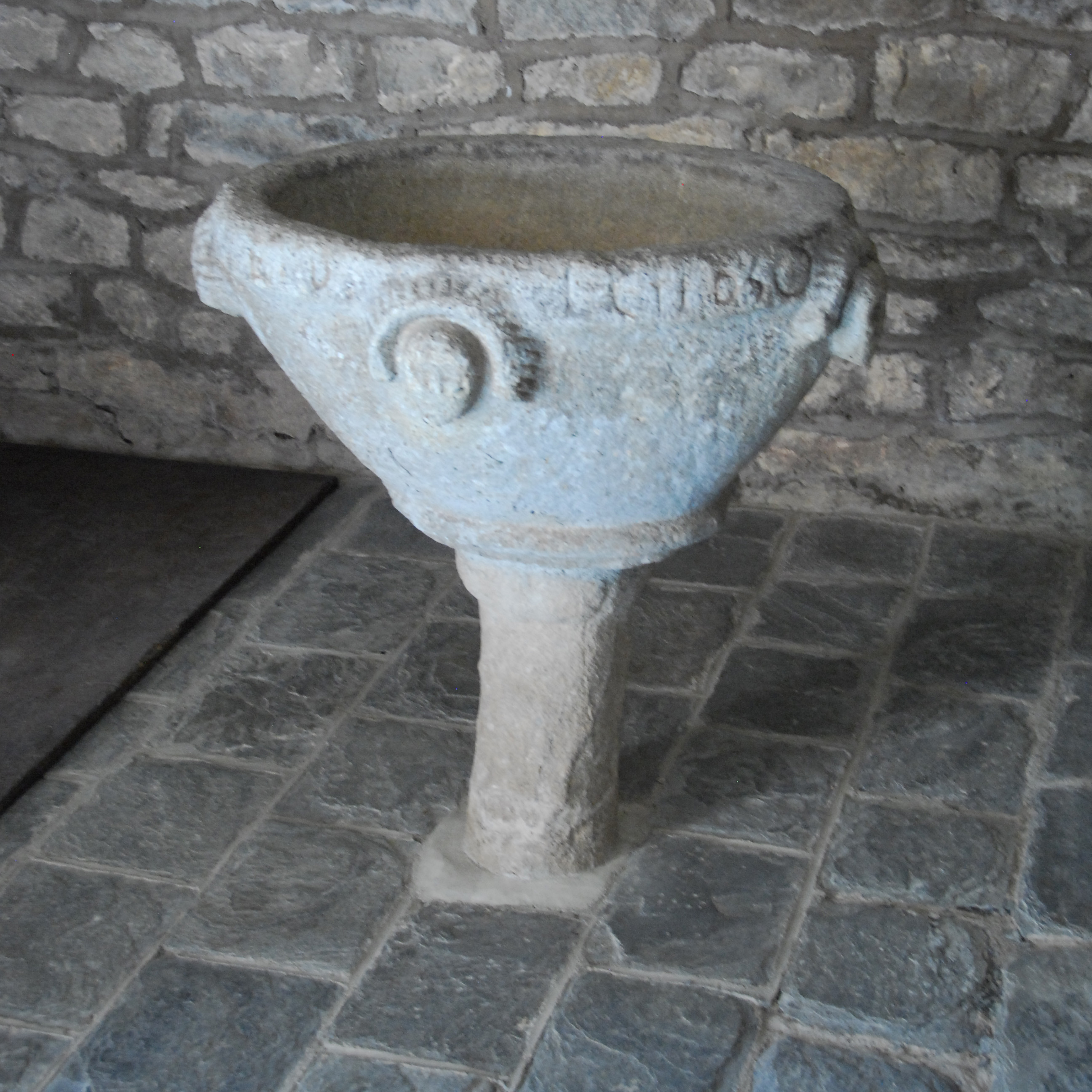
Font (2011)

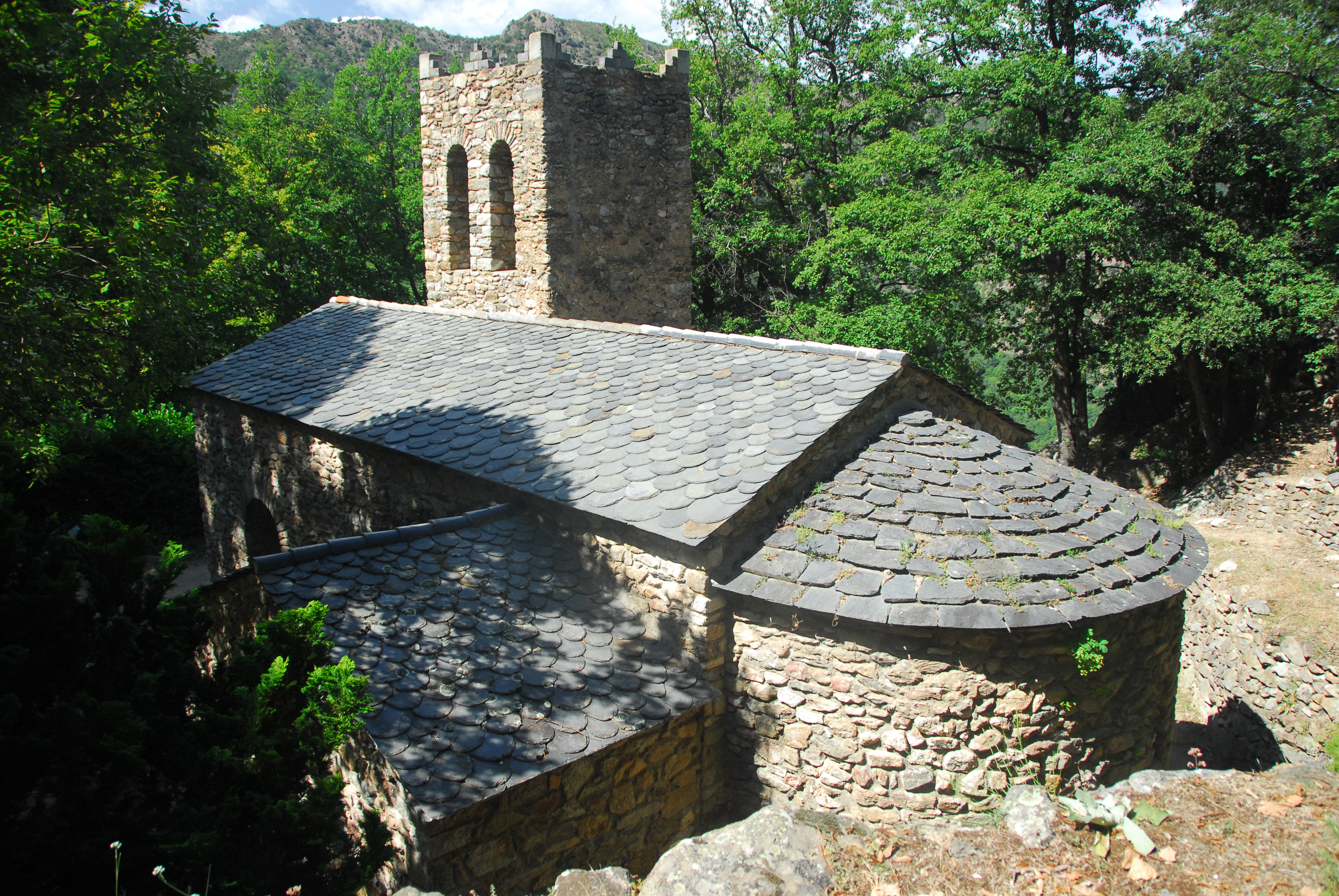
Slate tile roofs (2011)

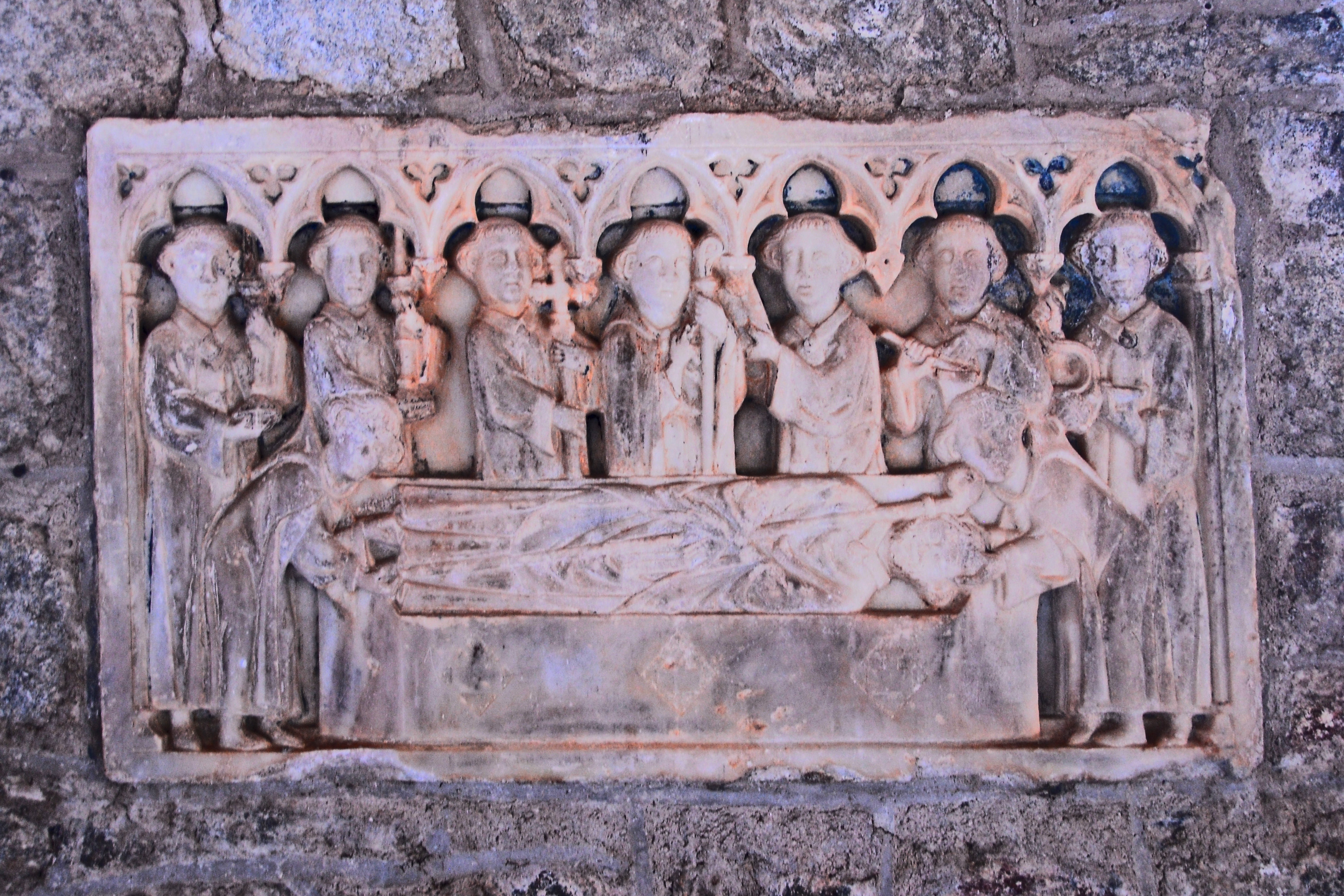
Relief, Monks burying an Abbot (2011)

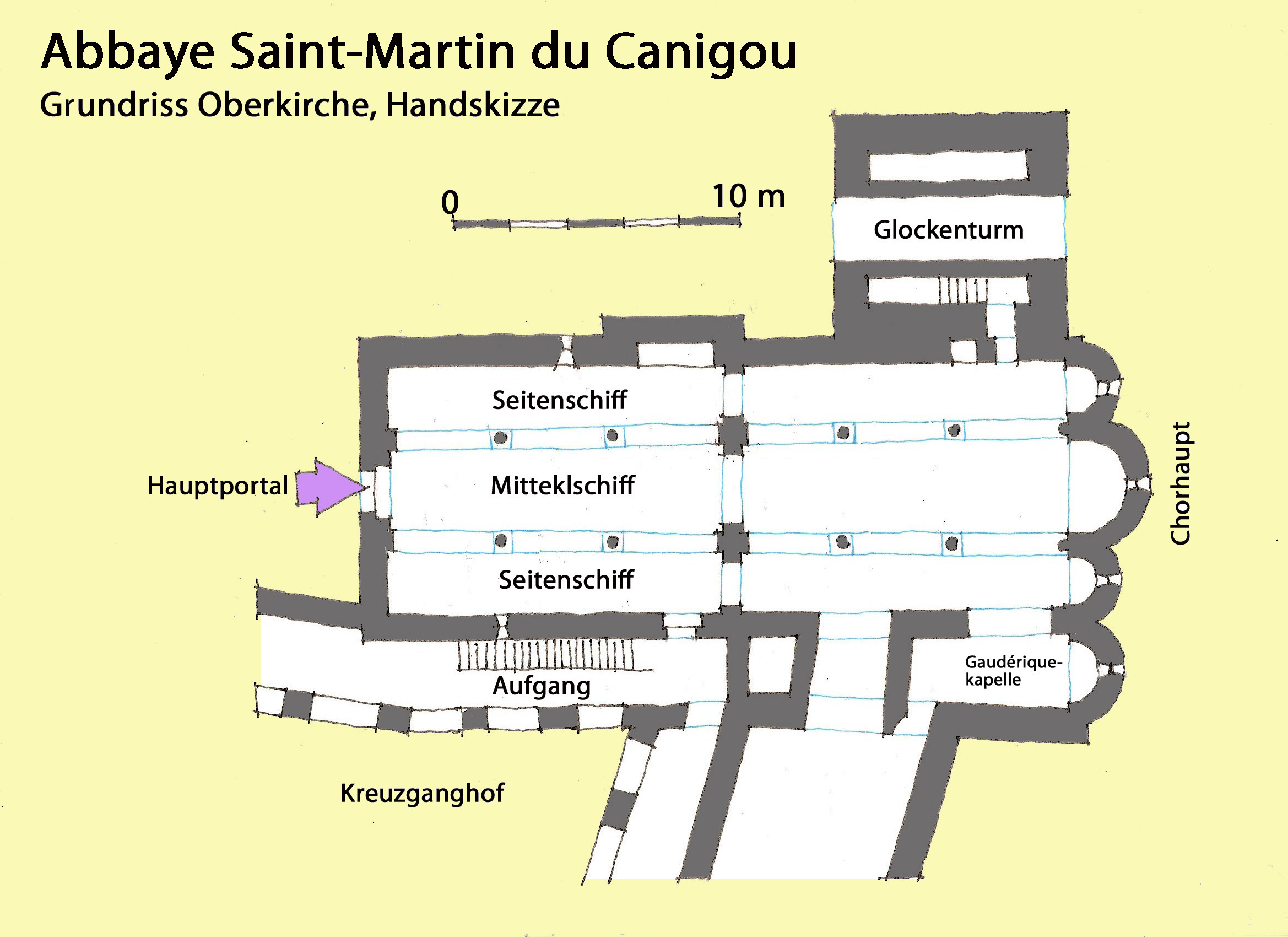
Floor plan of the upper church, Sketch (2011)

St. Benedict Chapel. This chapel, dedicated to the founder of the Benedictine order, is located at the end of a terrace, approximately 250 metres north of the abbey.

View to the north, down the Cady valley towards Vernet-les-Bains, from the St. Benedict chapel.

Medieval quarries close to the abbey from which white, Precambrian marble was extracted for sculpting cloister capitals in the abbey.

== Bibliography ==
- Cortade, Eugène (1972). La restauration de l'abbaye de Saint-Martin-du-Canigou par Mgr de Carsalade du Pont (in French). Prades: Revue Conflent.
