= William I of Cerdanya =

Occitan noble

William I Raymond (Catalan: Guillem Ramon; Occitan: Guilhem Ramon) (1068–1095) was the count of Cerdanya and Berga from the year of his birth till that of his death, giving up Berga a year earlier to his son William-Jordan.

He was the son of Raymond I of Cerdanya, who died a short while after his birth. He married Sancha, daughter of Ramon Berenguer I, Count of Barcelona, while they were both very young. William became the tutor of his nephew, the future Ramon Berenguer III. He took an interest in repopulating parts of his domain and promulgated the charter to the people of Villafranca.

In 1082, he fought on the losing side in the Battle of Almenar. In 1094, he granted Berga to his sons and the elder, William, inherited Cerdanya when he died the next year.

== Issue ==
- William II Jordan, Count of Cerdanya.
- Bernard, Count of Cerdanya.

Preceded by Raymond I	Count of Berga; 1068–1094	Succeeded by William II
Preceded by Raymond I	Count of Cerdanya; 1068–1095	Succeeded by William II
