= Bernard I of Berga =

Spanish count

Bernard I was the count of Berga from 1035 to 1050. He was the sixth of seven sons of Wilfred II of Cerdanya and his father's successor in Berga.

He died without heirs, so his county passed to his younger brother: Berengar.

Preceded by Wilfred	Count of Berga; 1035–1050	Succeeded by Berengar
