= Bernard I of Besalú =

Catalan Count of Besalú (r.988–1020)

Bernard I, Count of Besalú
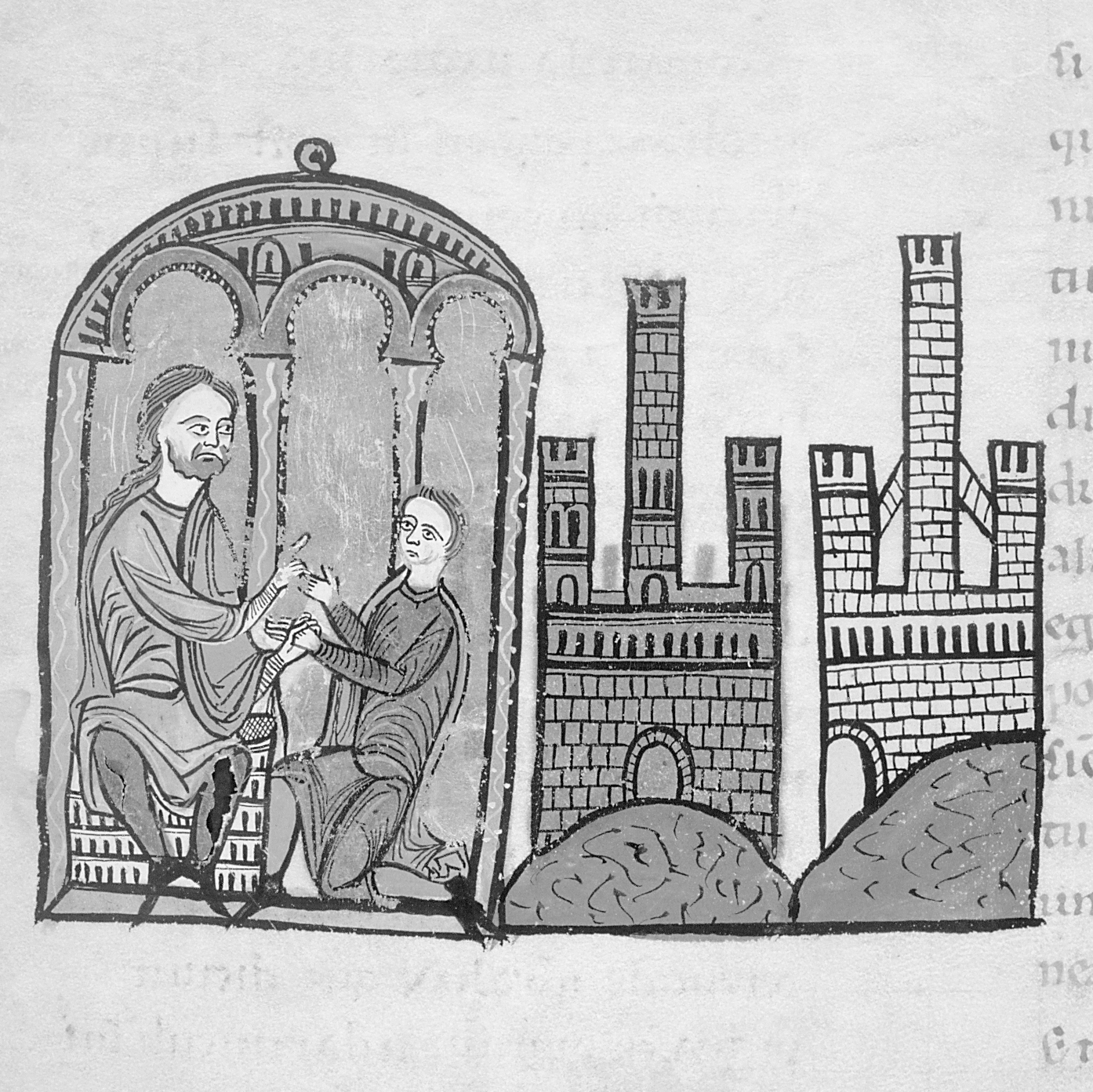
- Bernard commending his patrimony to his son, William, in a miniature accompanying his testament in the Liber feudorum maior (folio 61r)
- Died: 1020; River Rhône
- Buried: Monastery of Santa Maria de Ripoll
- Noble family: House of Barcelona
- Father: Oliba Cabreta
- Mother: Ermengard of Empúries

Bernard I (fl. 977 – 1020), called Taillefer (Bernat Tallaferro), was the Count of Besalú in Catalonia from 988 until his death. He was the eldest son of Oliba Cabreta and Ermengard of Empúries, and succeeded his father in Besalú while his younger brothers Oliba and Wifred, inherited Berga–Ripoll and Cerdagne–Conflent, respectively. (Note: The Gesta comitum Barcinonensium records Bernardum, Olibam et Guiffredum as the three sons of Olibano Cabretæ, and adds that Bernardus filius eius (Bernard his son) succeeded in comitatu Bisulduni (in the county of Besalú).) He was the great-grandson of Wilfred the Hairy, and therefore belonged to the House of Barcelona.

== Youth and succession ==
Bernard's first public action took place during the reign of his father, when he witnessed, alongside his mother, the donation of the church of Saint Vincent by Miro II to the church of Besalú on 12 April 977. According to the surviving charter, Miro ... comes atque episcopus (Miro ... count and bishop) granted ecclesiam sancti Vincentii (the church of Saint Vincent) to ecclesiæ Bisuldunensi (the church of Besalú) with the consent of Ermengardæ comitissæ et filio eis Bernardo (Countess Ermengard and her son Bernard). Bernard also witnessed his parents' donation of some property to Sant Llorenç de Bagà on 15 January 981, along with his brothers. (Note: The donors are named as Oliba comes et coniux mea Ermengards (Count Oliba and my wife Ermengard) in the surviving charter, while the witnesses are Bernardus prolis, Wifredus prolis, Oliba prolis (son Bernard, son Wifred, son Oliba).) Oliba Cabreta had left his sons a strong principality, perhaps the strongest in Catalonia. Its control extended over the great Catalan monasteries of Ripoll, Cuixà, Sant Joan, Lagrasse, Arles de Tec, Banyoles, and Camprodon.

Despite already being a father of his eventual heir William, he had not fully come of age when his father abdicated to become a monk at Montecassino (988), since he and Wifred were left under the protection of the Pope, then John XV. (Note: A charter from 988 relates how Bernardus comes cum filio suo Guilliermo et ... Guifredus frater eius (Count Bernard with his son William and ... Wifred his brother) were left under papal protection by piæ memoriæ patre Oliba comite ([their] father of pious memory, Count Oliba).) Alongside Besalú Bernard inherited the Fenouillèdes and Peyrepertuse in the County of Carcassonne, where his father had extended his dynasty's power base. Bernard also stood to inherit Vallespir on the death of his mother, which occurred after 994.

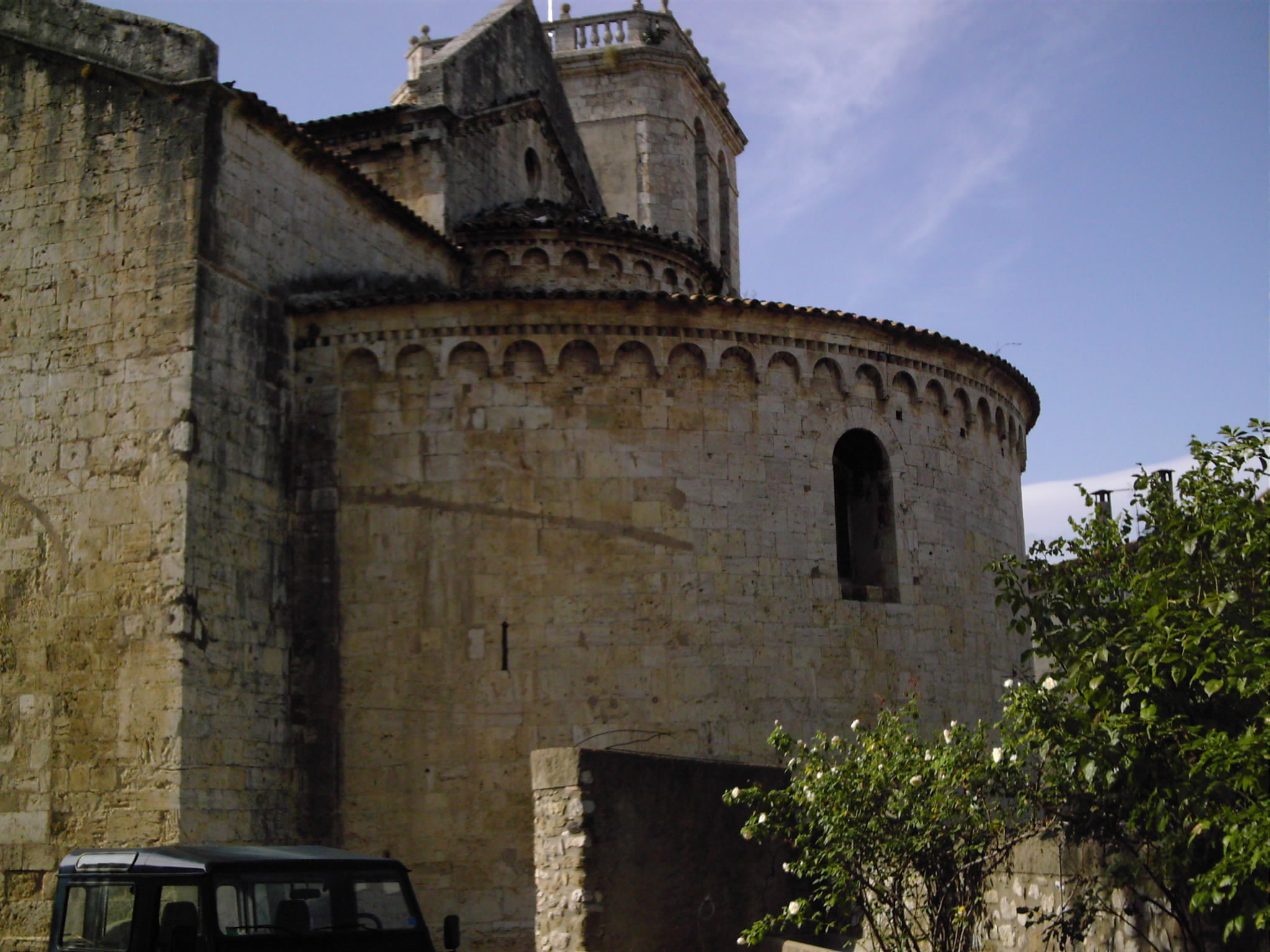
The aft exterior of the nave of the church of Sant Pere, which was rebuilt and re-dedicated under Bernard in 1003.

== Ecclesiastical policy ==
Despite its control of the great monasteries the family of Oliba Cabreta did not initially control a bishopric. This Bernard and his brothers immediately set out to rectify. Berengar, a younger brother, was made Bishop of Elne (993) and then Oliba resigned the county of Berga to Wifred and that of Ripoll to Bernard and entered the monastery of Ripoll (1003). He eventually became Bishop of Vic (1018). By a large sum of money Bernard and Wifred then obtained the Archdiocese of Narbonne for Wifred's second son, also Wifred (1016).

In 998 Bernard joined Ermengol I of Urgell on a pilgrimage to Rome, the first for either. There they participated in a synod held under the auspices of the Emperor Otto III. Ermengol returned to Rome in 1001. In 1016–17 Bernard and a large entourage that included with his sons William and Wifred, his brother Oliba, the viscounts of Besalú, Fenouillèdes, and Vallespir, the jurist Pons Bonfill, the abbot Adalbert, and many other dignitaries and prelates, went to Rome to celebrate Christmas at Saint Peter's Basilica. There Bernard petitioned Pope Benedict VIII to create a see in Besalú. He also accused the nuns of Sant Joan of impropriety and because they refused to appear before a papal tribunal, Benedict suppressed their convent, calling it a meretrius de Venus (brothel) and establishing instead some monks under the rule of Aachen and remanding to Bernard the feudal dues of the abbey. By a bull directed to the new bishop, Benedict created Bernard's desired bishopric. The count then paid to have his second son, Wifred, installed there. (Note: Benedict calls the see an episcopatum in propria hereditate perficere, "bishopric in your own patrimony".) Though a minor, Wifred was consecrated by the pope himself. The pope even gave Bernard the choice of the diocesan seat, which he placed in Besalú, in Adalbert's monastery there. (Note: The options were Sant Genís i Sant Miquel, Sant Joan, and Sant Pau, cf. Gros i Pujol, 82.) To this monastery the new community at Sant Joan was subjected. (Note: The surviving document indicates that Bernard claimed jurisdiction over Sant Joan ex iure paterno, that is, by hereditary right, cf. Gros i Pujol, 82.) From Rome Bernard brought back a relic of the Holy Cross (Santes Creus, lignum Crucis) and deposited it in Adalbert's Benedictine church, which already possessed altars dedicated to Sant Vicenç, Sant Salvador, Santa Maria, Sant Genís, and Sant Miquel Arcàngel.

Around 1000 Bernard founded a comital monastery at Sant Pau in the Fenouillèdes, delegating its organisation to Wifred, abbot of Cuixà. In 1003 the count transferred the ancient monastic community of Sant Aniol d'Aguja to Sant Llorenç del Mont. In the decade after Bernard's death this house was under the rule of abbot Tassius, also abbot of Sant Pere in 1029–31. The Aachen ruled church of Sant Pere in Besalú, rebuilt in a Romanesque style begun under Miro II, was consecrated on 23 September 1003 by Bernard.

Bernard's relationship with the Church was unusual. In two judgements emitted from his court in 1002 and 1004 the list of confirmants begins with four abbots, all figures at court and an indication of the preeminence of the monasteries in Besalú at the time. In a charter of February 1017 Bernard remarked that the Pope held the sceptre of the world, but in a spirit of independence added: "let no one, neither the Pope himself, nor a General Council, violate the conditions of this document".

== Military interventions ==
In 1003, Bernard took part in the defensive campaign—described as a "holy war" or "crusade"—that defeated an invading Córdoban army in battle near Thoranum castrum. Of the allied Catalan leaders, Bernard appears to have been the senior. (Note: The others were his brother Wifred, Raymond Borell of Barcelona, and Ermengol I of Urgell.) According to an early source (1043), before the battle Bernard reasoned that if the saints Peter and Michael and the Virgin Mary each killed 5,000 Muslims, there would be a manageable number left for the soldiers. He further recalls that the Muslims are often slain before they have a chance to retreat. In the end, the Córdobans retreated to their own territory, where a second battle was fought at Albesa. The result of this second battle is unclear, but probably not favourable to the Christians; however, it was the end of the brief war, and possibly of the campaigning season as well. Bernard's presence at this second battle can be surmised based on the presence of his brother Berengar, who died there.

When Giselbert I of Roussillon died in 1014 his brother Hugh I of Empúries invaded the County of Roussillon and tried to wrest it from the hands of Giselbert's young son, Gausfred II, who appealed to Bernard and Oliba for aid. Through their intervention Hugh and Gausfred came to terms in 1020.

== Administration ==
In 1005 Bernard began using the title prince (princeps, which at the time retained its sense, derived from Isidore, of "sovereign"). His brother Oliba, in perpetuating his memory, calls him princeps et pater patriae: sovereign and father of his country. Oliba also lauds his fair judgement. In 1015 Bernard began using the title duke (dux), implying military and even ethnic leadership, but not usurping royal rank.

During Bernard's rule in Besalú there is evidence of continued reliance on the Liber iudiciorum of the Visigoths and on the Frankish court system established by the Carolingians. There is also the earliest evidence of new judicial procedures, some of which had already been developed in Occitania, such as the court of procures et boni homines, the relinquishing of property rights known as a guirpitio, and the agreement called a pacto or conventio. Bernard minted his own currency, but no examples survive, the only evidence of it being documentary. Later coins of his grandson and namesake, Bernard II, contain a representation of a cross, representing the relic Bernard I retrieved in Rome. He was also the first Catalan count to have his own seal, imitating the Carolingian emperors and the Frankish kings in style. Though the latter were his nominal sovereigns, the existence of such a seal suggests that civil authority rested entirely with Bernard.

== Marriage, heirs, and death ==
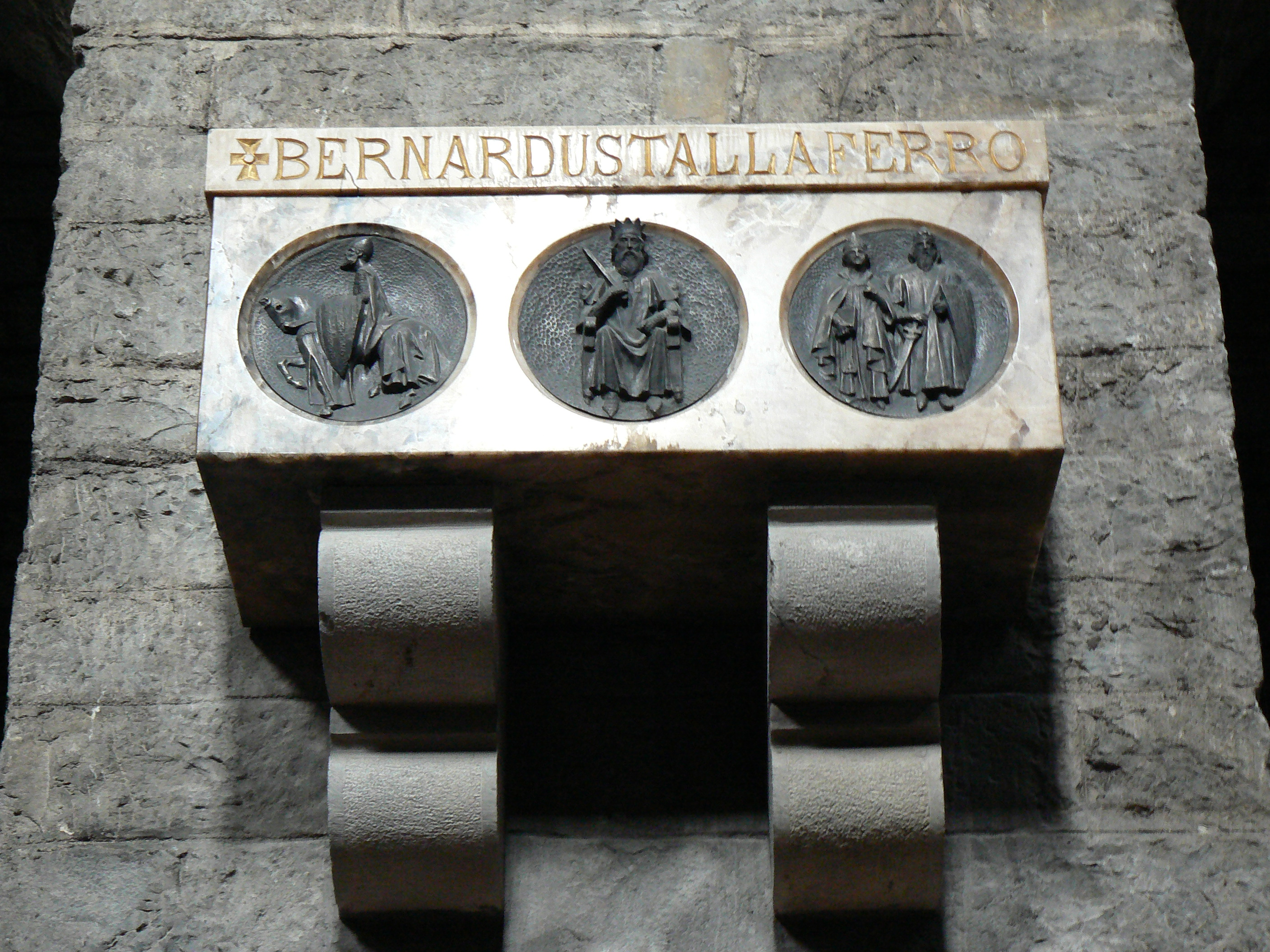
Renovated nineteenth-century sepulchre of Bernard in the monastery of Santa Maria de Ripoll.

In 992, Bernard married Toda, also known as Adelaide, as contemporary charters attest. A grant of property dated 27 March 1000 to the church of Santa Maria del Castell de Besalú refers to uxori mee Tota que vocant Azalatz (my wife Toda who they call Adelaide) and another grant to the same, dated 1 March 1018, refers to uxor mea Tota comitissa que vocatur Adalet (my wife, the countess Toda, who is called Adelaide). The couple was a consistent patron of said church, also making a donation on 7 May 1012, with their son. (Note: The charter reads: Bernardus ... comes et eius conniunx ... Adalez prolique eorum Wielmo (Count Bernard and his wife Adelaide and his son William). The donation of 1018 also named William (filius meus Wielmus).) She is never mentioned after the publication of Bernard's will.

According to the modern Europäische Stammtafeln, Toda may have been the daughter of William I of Provence or William II Sánchez of Gascony. It has been hypothesised that she was the route by which the exotic Byzantine name Constance, feminine form of Constantine, entered Spain. Boso II of Arles had married Constance, speculated to have been daughter of Charles Constantine and granddaughter of the Emperor Louis III by Anna, daughter of Leo VI the Wise. Boso's son, William I of Provence, married Adelaide of Anjou; thus both Adelaide and Constance are in his name pool. If Bernard's wife was indeed his William I's daughter, this would explain the name of Bernard's own eldest daughter and perhaps the name of a certain Constance, wife of Sancho Garcés, illegitimate son of García Sánchez III of Pamplona, and a daughter of García's wife, Stephanie, by a previous marriage, perhaps to an unnamed son of Bernard of Besalú. (Note: This thesis is that of Jaime de Salazar y Acha who proposes that this also explains Stephanie's presence in Barcelona at the time of her second marriage, as she was the widowed daughter-in-law of an important Catalan magnate. Salazar does confuse Leo VI with Constantine VII.)

Bernard drowned in the river Rhône while crossing into the County of Provence in 1020 and was buried in the monastery of Santa Maria de Ripoll. (Note: ad Rivipollo Monasterium according to the Gesta Comitum Barcinonensium.) Bernard's will, dated 26 September 1020, lists his children as Henry (Asenric/Aienrich), Hugh, Berengar, Adelaide, Constance, and William, and also names his wife and brother Oliba. (Note: Bernard is already described as "formerly count" (Bernardo quondam Comite). The will is dated to the twenty-fifth year of Robert II of France (XXV regnante Roberto Rege). The lists of relatives goes: filio suo Asenrico ... filium suum Ugonem ... filium suum Berengarium ... filia sua Adalai ... filia sua Constancia ... uxore sua Tota ... filium suum Guillelmum ... Oliva frater suus.) His will was then published by his widow, his brother Oliba, his son Wifred, and the three other executors in a charter of 13 October, but this version does name his daughters and adds his brother Wifred and his nephew, Wifred's son and eventual successor, Raymond I. (Note: This charter of Bernardo condam comite was confirmed by Wifredus comes ... Tota comitissa (Count Wifred ... Countess Toda). The lists of his relatives goes: filio [suo] Wilielmo ... filium suum Ugonem ... filio suo Biringario ... nepotem suum qui comes fuit de Cerdania ... Aienrichus filius suus ... fratribus suis Wifredo et Olibane (his son William ... his son Hugh ... his son Berengar ... his nephew/grandson who was count of Cerdagne ... his son Aienrich ... his brothers Wifred and Oliba).) One of the executors of his will was Pons Bonfill. He left his younger sons under the tutelage (in tuicione) of their elder brother William, who inherited Besalú. His second son, Wifred, was already bishop of Besalú and his third son, Henry, he named as Wifred's heir in the diocese, with the price of his elevation (to bribe the cathedral chapter) to be paid by William. (Note: The testament reads: remaneat ipsum episcopatum Sancti Salvatoris, cuius ecclesia sita est infra muros Bisulduno, simul cum abbatia Sancti Iohannis, indicating that the bishopric was known after its church, Sant Salvador, and that the abbey of Sant Joan still pertained to it.) Bernard's two younger sons, Hugh and Berengar, inherited allodial lands strategically placed on the borders of the county. Though they were recognised as "co-heirs", these younger sons were never more than castellans and vassals of their elder brother.

Bernard's eldest daughter, Constance, received several allods in his will. She may be the Constance, also known as Velasquita, who married Count Ermengol II of Urgell as his second wife, as part of the count's policy of strengthening his ties with Besalú, which lay between his county and powerful Barcelona. Another of Bernard's daughters, Adelaide, married Ponç I of Empúries, son and heir of Hugh I; widowed, she entered the monastery of Sant Pau. A possible daughter Garsenda (Garcinda), unnamed in his will, married Berengar, viscount of Narbonne.

== In legend and epic ==
There is a historical relationship between Bernard and the Catalan legend of Comte Arnau. Traditionally, Arnau is a Don Juan figure who carries on a series sexual liaisons with the nuns of Sant Joan de les Abadesses. The abbess in the legend, who tries to keep Arnau from entering the convent, is usually named Engelberga. In 1017, at Bernard's insistence, Pope Benedict suppressed the convent, then under Bernard's sister Ingilberga, for rampant sexually immorality.

The Catalan-language writer Jacint Verdaguer drew on the historical count of Besalú for his fictional character Comte Tallaferro, who figures as the protagonist in his epic poem Canigó, a central work of the Catalan Renaixença.

== Bibliography ==
- Fernández-Xesta y Vázquez, Ernesto (2001). Relaciones del Condado de Urgell con Castilla y León. Madrid.
- Pons i Guri, Josep; Palou i Miquel, Hug (2002). Un cartoral de la canònica agustiniana de Santa Maria del Castell de Besalú (segles X-XV) (PDF) (in Catalan). Barcelona: Fundació Noguera. ISBN 84-7935-993-5. Archived from the original (PDF) on 2021-05-18.
- Salazar y Acha, Jaime de (1994). "Reflexiones sobre la posible historicidad de un episodio de la Crónica Najerense". Príncipe de Viana (in Spanish). Vol. 55, no. 201. pp. 149–156. ISSN 0032-8472.
