= County of Besalú =

Historical state

County of Besalú: Comtat de Besalú (Catalan); Comitatus Bisuldunensis (Latin)
- 878–1111
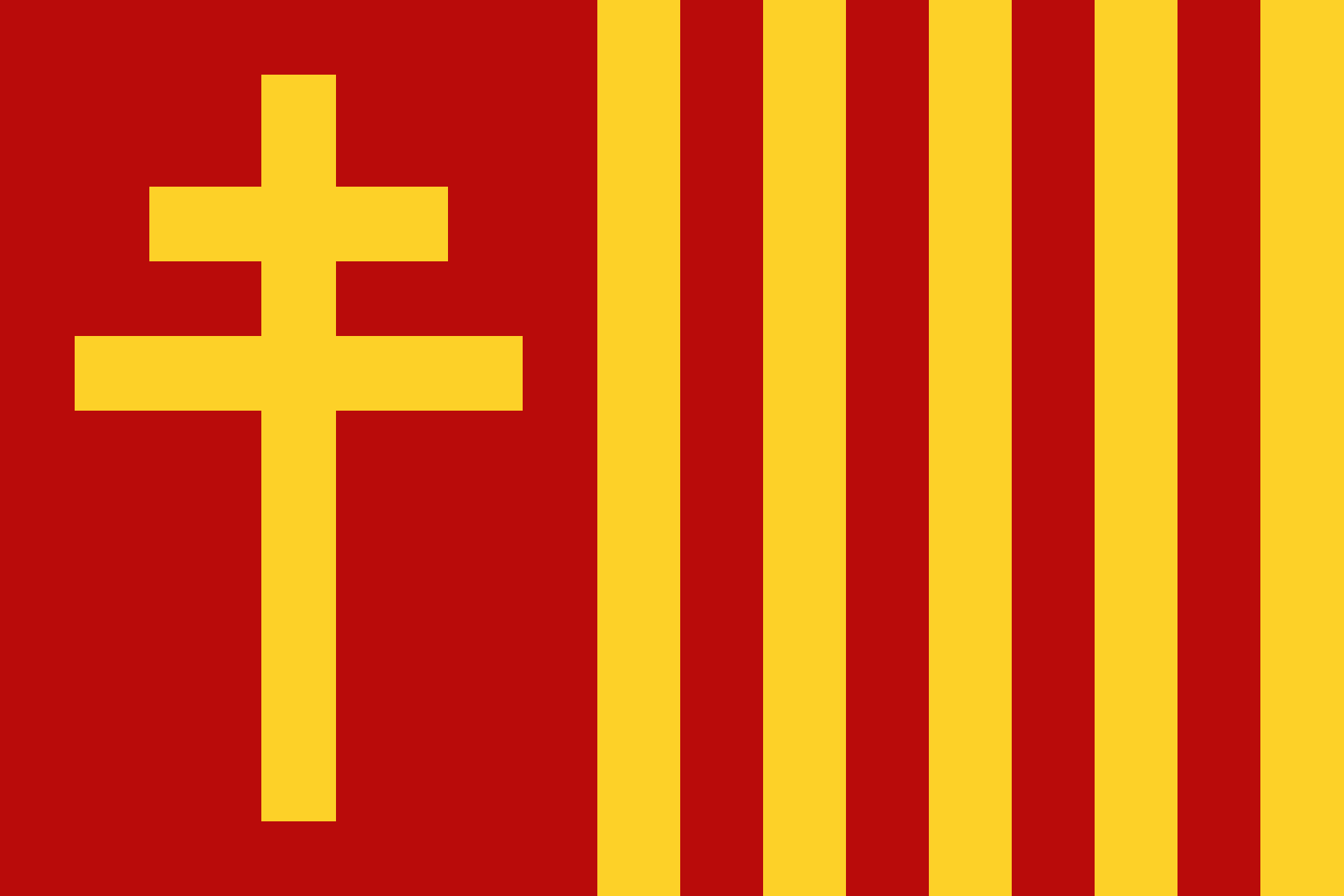
- Flag
- Capital: Besalú
- Common languages: Old Catalan
- Religion: Roman Catholicism
- Government: Feudal County
- Count of Besalú
  - 878-912: Radulf (first)
  - 1100-1111: Bernard III (last)
- Historical era: Early Middle Ages
  - Established: 878
  - Disestablished: 1111
Preceded by	Succeeded by
County of Girona	County of Barcelona
- Today part of: Core: Garrotxa; Reached: Aude

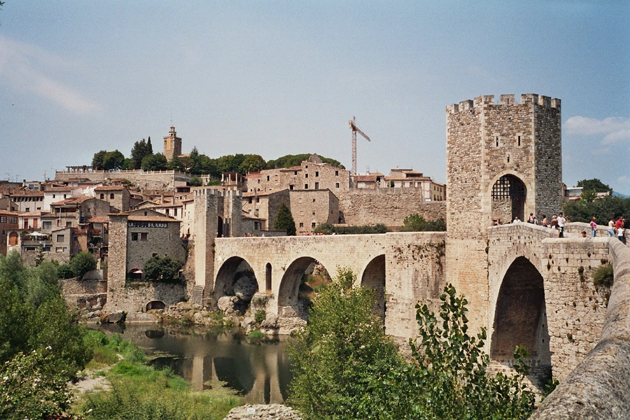
The medieval remains of Besalú. The bridge dates to the twelfth century.

The County of Besalú (Catalan: Comtat de Besalú, IPA: [kumˈtad də βəzəˈlu]; Latin: Comitatus Bisuldunensis) was one of the landlocked medieval Catalan counties near the Mediterranean coastline. It was roughly coterminous with the modern comarca of Garrotxa and at various times extended as far north as Corbières, Aude, now in France. Its capital was the village of Besalú. Throughout most of its history it was attached to one of the other more powerful counties, but it experienced a century of independence before it was finally and irrevocably annexed to the County of Barcelona.

== 9th century: origins and development ==
Besalú was reconquered from the Moors by 785. It was originally a pagus of the County of Girona in the Marca Hispanica. The original pagus comprised the territories of Garrotxa and those neighbouring Montgrony and Setcases in the comarca of Ripollès as far as Agullana and Figueres (in Alt Empordà) and Banyoles in Pla de l'Estany.

In the Ordinatio Imperii of 817, Louis the Pious made it a part of Aquitaine and ruled it directly along with the other maritime counties of the Marca: Roussillon, Girona, Barcelona, and Empúries. Besalú, along with Barcelona and Girona were placed under Count Bera, a Visigoth. Under Louis the Pious Gothia saw a reinvigorated monasticism spread first in Pallars and then eastward into Roussillon, Empúries, and Besalú. Under Louis and his successors, a system of aprisiones was established in Besalú, largely held by native Goths and immigrant Gascons.

During the reign of Charles the Bald, Besalú was attached to the counties of Urgel and Cerdanya. In 871, Wilfred the Hairy and his kin began the encastellation of Besalú by constructing a forward castle at Castellaris. Wilfred later separated it and made his brother Radulf its count and it became one of the last de facto independent Catalan counties.

== 10th century: attached to Cerdanya ==
Sometime between 913 and 920, Radulf died and Miro the Younger, Count of Cerdanya, took over Besalú, even though it should have gone to Sunyer II, Count of Barcelona and Girona. When Miro died in 927, his counties were ruled indivisibly by his widow Ava as regent for his two sons, Sunifred II and Wilfred II. When the two reached their majority, Sunifred governed Cerdanya and the younger Wilfred Besalú under the suzerainty of his older brother.

The brothers, and their younger brothers Oliba Cabreta and Miro Bonfill, acted consonantly throughout their lives. In 943 Sunyer of Barcelona attacked Besalú and Ripoll and Sunifred came to Wilfred's aid. The brother also retained their ties to the French crown, though they often carried the title marchio, probably without royal sanction but perhaps as an honour from Carolingian times. Oliba received royal lands and rights in Besalú from Rudolph in 929, indicating the presence and memory of the royal fisc in Besalú. Wilfred even going to the court of Louis IV in order to solicit a privilege of immunity to the monastery of Sant Pere de Camprodon which he and his brother had jointly founded as their legacy. Wilfred also received a portion of the property which the viscount Unifred had treacherously taken from Ermengol of Osona by a precept of Louis's.

In the latter half of the tenth century, the power and authority of the counts of Besalú and Cerdanya increased. In 957, Besalú was rocked by the rebellion of a faction of the noblesse backing the sons of the deceased count Radulf. Wilfred was assassinated and Sunifred annexed the property of the rebels and took over the county. In 965, Sunifred passed all his counties on to Oliba, who gave Besalú as a subordinate countship to Miro, but when Miro became Bishop of Girona in 971, Besalú was reattached to Cerdanya.

== 11th century: independent county ==
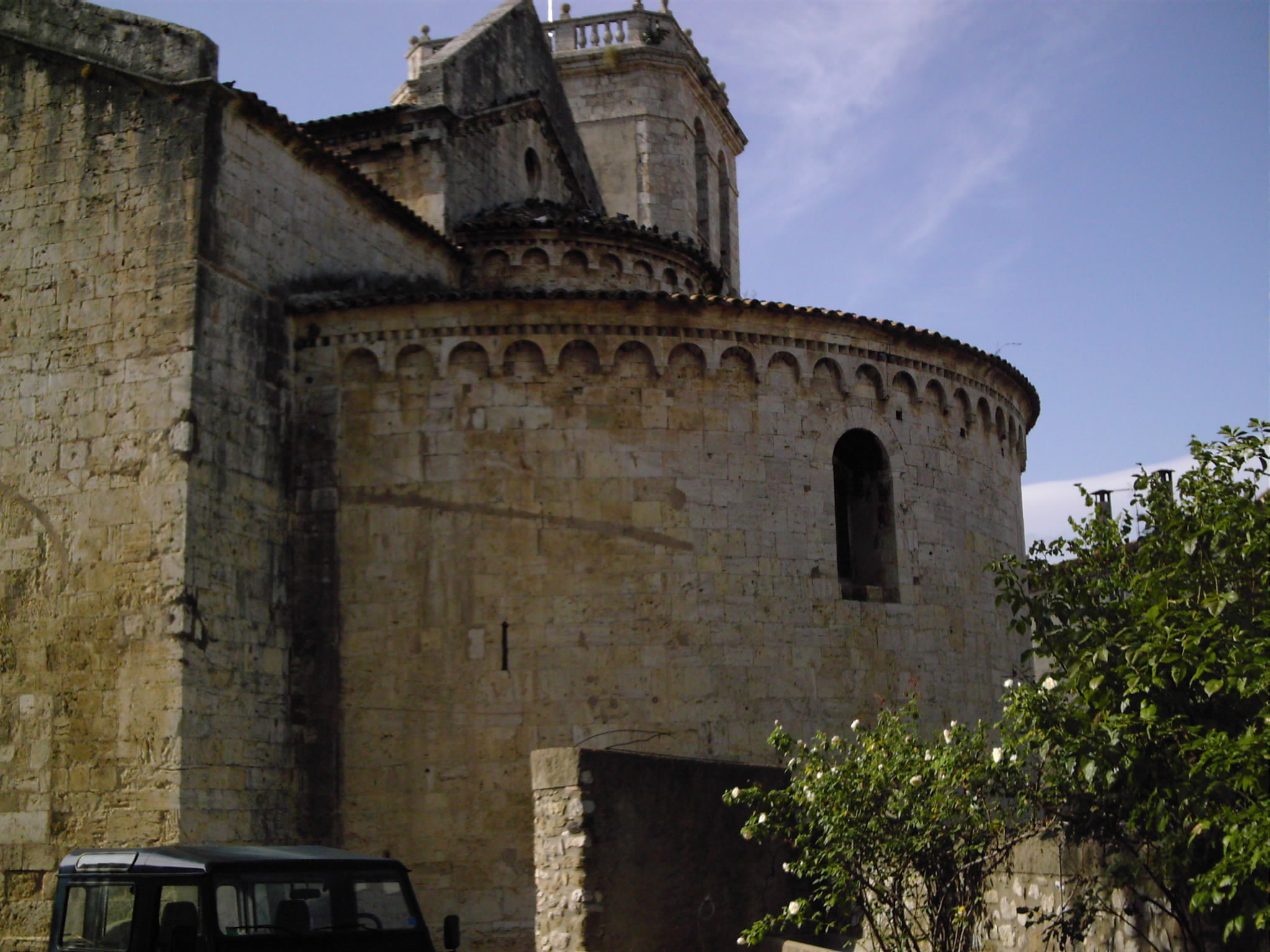
The aft exterior of the nave of the church of San Pere, dedicated in 1003. It was the cathedral of the short-lived diocese of Besalú.

In 988, Oliba entered Montecassino and left Besalú — along with Vallespir, Fenouillèdes, and Peyrepertuse — to Bernard Tallaferro. He annexed Ripoll in 1002. He inaugurated an independent line of rulers in Besalú and thus diminished the power of his dynasty. Pope Benedict VIII established diocese in Besalú for Bernard's benefit, but it was short-lived.

The last quarter of the 10th century and first quarter of the 11th witnessed very little war in southern France and Catalonia, some of the only instances occurring between Oliba Cabreta and the Counts of Carcassonne. In this period as well, Carolingian courts and Gothic law were still in effect in Besalú, as late as 1031. Between 969 and 1020, the county of Besalú minted its own money, though this currency has not been preserved in the form of coins, its only evidence being documentary. Between 1020 and 1111, three different kinds of silver coin were minted in Besalú. The engravings of Besalú in the eleventh century have been considered some of the best exemplars of the Romanesque style.

In 1066, William II died and Besalú was co-ruled by his brother, Bernard II and his son, Bernard III. In 1100, the moderate and stable Bernard II died and Bernard III began to reign on his own. He had little support from the local nobility and Raymond Berengar III of Barcelona took the opportunity to augment his influence in the region.

At the turn of the 12th century, Besalú extended as across the Pyrenees as far as Corbières. It dominated and patronised the monasteries of Sant Joan de les Abadesses, Saint-Michel-de-Cuxa, and Lagrasse. It encompassed the castles of Tautavel, Vingrau, Queribus, Aguilar, and Peyrepertuse, which were refortified in the thirteenth century by Louis IX of France as forming his southern border with the Crown of Aragon by the Treaty of Corbeil (1259). The rest of Besalú was a part of the Principality of Catalonia within the Crown.

In 1107, Bernard III married Jimena, Raymond Berengar's daughter. In the marriage pact, Raymond Berengar ceded Ausona and the Diocese of Vic with all their castles. In return, Barcelona became the heir of Bernard if he died without children. At the time Bernard was fifty years of age (older than his father-in-law) and Jimena a mere child of seven or eight. It was not unlikely that Bernard would die before the marriage could legally be consummated. The aging and ineffectual Count of Besalú showed no desire to govern and readily allowed his new father-in-law to fill the vacuum left by the death of Bernard II.

In 1111, Bernard died and Barcelona inherited Besalú. This led to conflict with Bernard William of Cerdanya, who was the feudal suzerain of Besalú. The problem was solved by the cession of Vallespir, Fenolledès, Peyrepertuse, and Castellnou to Cerdanya for compensation.

== Bishopric of Besalú ==
Some of the most important monasteries in Catalonia were located in Besalú: Sant Joan de les Abadesses, Santa María de Ripoll, Bañolas, Camprodón, and Sant Pau de Fenollet. There was not, however, a bishop in Besalú. Rather, the abbacies were dependent on the dioceses of Vic, Girona, and Elne. In 1017, Pope Benedict conceded to Bernard Tallaferro the right to establish a diocese of his own. Ignoring the proposals of Joan de les Abadesses and Sant Pau de Fenollet, Bernard founded it in Besalú itself. The first bishop was his own son Wilfred, abbot of Sant Joan de les Abadesses.

On Bernard's death in 1020, the bishops of Girona and Vic reclaimed their ancient rights over the parishes of Besalú. Wilfred, lacking a political protector, retired to his monastery and the diocese of Besalú was abolished.

== List of counts ==
- Radulf, 878–912
- Miro I the Younger, 912–927
- Ava, 927–941, as regent for...
- Wilfred (II), 927–957
- Sunifred, 957–965
- Miro II Bonfill, 965–984
- Oliba Cabreta, 984–988
- Bernard I, 988–1020
- William I, 1020–1052
- William II, 1052–1066
- Bernard II, 1066–1100
- Bernard III, 1100–1111

== See also ==
- Viscounty of Besalú

== Sources ==
- Lewis, Archibald Ross. The Development of Southern French and Catalan Society, 718–1050. University of Texas Press: Austin, 1965.
- Cheyette, Fredric L. Ermengard of Narbonne and the World of the Troubadours. Ithaca: Cornell University Press, 2001.
- Bolòs, Jordi and Víctor Hurtado. Atles del comtat de Besalú (785–988). Barcelona: Rafael Dalmau, 1998. ISBN 84-232-0520-7.
