= Wilfred II of Besalú =

Wilfred II of Besalú (died 957) was count of Besalú from 927 to 957.

== Origin ==
He was the son of Miró II of Cerdanya and his wife Ava. He inherited the county of Besalú, while his brother Sunifred received the county of Cerdanya. Both were minors, and his mother Ava was made regent until 941.

== Political life ==
He was the last Catalan count that came to pay tribute to the Carolingian king. He traveled to Rome in 952. He founded the monastery of Sant Pere de Camprodon.

== Titles and successors ==
He died at the hands of his rebellious vassals. Childless and therefore heirless, he was succeeded by his elder brother Sunifred II of Cerdanya.

Preceded by Miró II of Cerdanya	Count of Besalú; 927-957	Succeeded by Sunifred II of Cerdanya
