= Miró II of Cerdanya =

Miró II of Cerdanya and I of Besalú (878?–927), was count of Cerdanya from 897 to 927 and of Besalú from 920 to 927. The lands he controlled lay in the eastern Pyrenees.

He was the son of Wilfred the Hairy, Count of Barcelona, from whom he inherited the county of Cerdanya. His brother Sunifred received the county of Urgell, and his brothers Wilfred II Borrell and Sunyer I received the county of Barcelona. After the death of his uncle, Radulf of Besalú, in 920, he inherited the county of Besalú. His sister, Hemmo (Emma), became abbess of the Monastery of Sant Joan de les Abadesses in Ripollès founded by their father.

Miro continued the work of his father, contributing to the ecclesiastical restoration of the pagus of Berga.

He and Ava of Cerdanya had four sons and one daughter:

- Sunifred II of Cerdanya (915–968), who received the county of Cerdanya from his father, and became count of Besalú after his brother's death
- Wilfred II of Besalú (d. 957), who received the county of Besalú from his father
- Miró III of Cerdanya (d. 984), who became count of Cerdayna and Besalú after Sunifred's death
- Oliba Cabreta (920–990), who received both counties as well as that of Ripoll
- Fredeburga of Cerdanya, abbess of the Monastery of Sant Joan de les Abadesses

Also, his relationship with Virgilia of Empúries, daughter of Dela, count of Empúries, produced (among others):

- Guifred
- Gotruda of Cerdanya (c. 920 – c. 963), who married Lope I of Pallars (Wolf Pillars)
- Cilixona, who married Ajalbert
- Guilinda
- Sesenanda

Preceded by Wilfred the Hairy	Count of Cerdanya; 897–927	Succeeded by Sunifred II
Preceded by Radulf	Count of Besalú; 920–927	Succeeded by Wilfred II of Besalú
