= Bernard II of Besalú =

Catalan nobleman

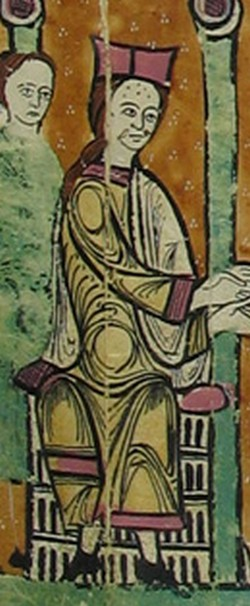
Bernard depicted in the Liber feudorum maior

Bernard II (Catalan: Bernat, Spanish: Bernardo; died 1100) was the Count of Besalú and Ripoll in Catalonia, the brother, co-ruler (from 1052), and successor of William II, who was assassinated in 1066. The second son of William I of Besalú and his wife, Adelaide, Bernard married his first cousin Ermengarda, daughter of Ponç I of Empúries and Adelaide, sister of William I.

He was suspected of involvement in the murder of his brother. He was also a strong proponent of the Gregorian reforms. Described as "pietós i versàtil" (pious and versatile), he was the opposite of his brother, "iracund i violent de caràcter" (of an irascible and violent character). He almost certainly took the cross and joined the First Crusade.

== Coinage ==
During his co-reign with his brother, denarii and oboli were minted by the church bearing an effigy of Saint Raphael on the obverse, with the initials S-R, and an effigy of Saint Prim or perhaps Jesus Christ on the reverse. In 1075 Bernard recovered the right to mint coinage, which had been granted to the church of the Blessed Virgin Mary by his father. The coins he minted, weighing between 0.5 and 0.6 grams, were divided by a cross on the obverse, with the words SANC-TA CR-VX (sancta crux means holy cross) on the horizontal and vertical bars respectively, and with the letters BR-NR-DS-CO (Bernardus comes, meaning count Bernard) in the spaces remaining. The reverse bore the word BISIL-DVNO (Bisilduno, of Besalú). Bernard did grant to the church a tenth of the money minted in Besalú in perpetuity, whether of gold or of silver.

== Ecclesiastical politics ==
We beseech most carefully your lordships on behalf of the city or rather the church of Tarragona and we order you to make a vigorous effort to restore it in every possible way for the remission of sins. For you know what a great defence it would be for Christ's people and what a terrible blow it would be to the Saracens if, by the goodness of God, the position of that famous city were restored. If the knights of other provinces have decided with one mind to go to the aid of the Asian Church and to liberate their brothers from the tyranny of the Saracens, so ought you with one mind and with our encouragement to work with greater endurance to help a church so near you resist the invasions of the Saracens. No one must doubt that if he dies on this expedition for the love of God and his brothers his sins will surely be forgiven and he will gain a share of eternal life through the most compassionate mercy of our God. So if any of you has made up his mind to go to Asia, it is here instead that he should try to fulfill his vow, because it is no virtue to rescue Christians from the Saracens in one place, only to expose them to the tyranny and oppression of the Saracens in another. May almighty God arouse in your hearts a love of your brothers and reward your bravery with victory over the enemy.
—Letter of Pope Urban II to Bernard and the other Catalan counts preparing to go on the First Crusade

He presided over synods held at Girona in 1068, 1078, and 1097, and was forced to act against his simoniacal relative, Wifred, Archbishop of Narbonne. Around 1068 Bernard, Wifred, and the bishops Berengar of Girona and William of Vic had to expel by force the simoniacal abbot of Ripoll, Miro. In 1070 he subjected the monasteries of Santa Maria de Ripoll, Sant Pere de Besalú, and Sant Martí de Les to that of Saint-Victor de Marseille. It was probably at the instigation of his relative Hunald, abbot of Moissac, that Bernard ceded Ripoll to the jurisdiction of the abbot of Saint-Victor, Bernard de Rodez, at a meeting of the two on 27 December 1070. On 2 February 1071 a Marseillaise abbot, Bernard, is already recorded acting in charge of Ripoll. Bernard had granted the monastery of Cuberes to the Cluniac foundation of Moissac by 1073. In 1078 he joined his three monasteries of Sant Pere de Camprodon, Sant Pau del Fenollet (Valloles), and Santa Maria d'Arles de Tec to Moissac.

In December 1077 in a synod was held in Besalú by the papal legate Amatus, Bishop of Oloron. Bernard, acting upon the advice of the legate, deposed and replaced the simoniacal abbots of his realm. He then issued a charter wherein he listed the payments (census) due the Holy See from seven religious houses in his lands, he declared an irregularly or simoniacally elected abbot deposed by papal authority, and he promised that he and his successors would incur a personal census of 100 gold mancuses annually in order that he might be considered a "special knight of Saint Peter" (pecularis miles sancti Petri). Despite the promises, there is no actual evidence of payment during the pontificate of Gregory VII. It is sometimes said that Bernard—following the example of Sancho Ramírez, who had done the same with the Kingdom of Aragon in 1068—surrendered his county to the Papacy and received it back as a fief. The abbot of Saint-Victor de Marseille and papal legate to the council, Ricard de Milhau, and the monks of Ripoll pressed Bernard to join the abbey of Sant Joan de les Abadesses to Saint-Victor, perhaps by promising to restore Benedictine rule there. The cession was finalised on 4 January 1083. There is no contemporary record of this, however. Rather the legend dates from the 1115 house chronicle of Sant Joan. Bernard held his county directly from God.

By a charter dated 26 September 1084, Bernard donated the church of the Blessed Virgin Mary in Besalú to the Abbey of Saint Rufus in Valence. This charter refers to a son, but Bernard was succeeded on his death by Bernard III, whose precise relationship with the previous counts of Besalú has not been discovered.

Having taken the cross to join the First Crusade after the Council of Clermont (1095), Bernard was nonetheless counselled by Pope Urban II to instead remain in Spain and fight the Reconquista. In a letter that must be dated between January 1096 and July 1099, Urban wrote to Bernard, his brother Wifred, Hugh II of Empúries, Giselbert II of Roussillon, and their followers, urging the recovery of the city of Tarragona and its vacant archdiocese.

== Secular politics ==
Bernard took part in the battle of Almenar (1082) on the side of the other Catalan counts in alliance with the taifa of Lleida. They were defeated by the forces of the taifa of Zaragoza under El Cid.

In 1097 Bernard ceded the lordship of Olot to Ripoll. In 1099 Dalmau Berenguer, viscount of Rocabertí, ceded the allodial castle of Hortal to Bernard, who bestowed it on him as a fief. Donald Kagay translates an example of the "transfer of castle by a lord to the son of a deceased vassal" taken from the surviving charters of Bernard:

This is a pact in commemoration of an agreement which Count Bernat of Besalú made with Bernat Terron. The aforesaid Count gives to aforesaid Bernat the castle of Fenollet and commends to him all of his father's fief after his father’s death. And because of this, he is his vassal who shall be faithful to him for all time and post the sureties for him which he must just as his other liege vassals do and must do for him. And Bernat after the death of his father must grant freely, faithfully, and without diminution to lord God and San Paulo de Vallsol all the village of Mauri with all of its appurtenances so that he shall be a vassal for all these things to lord God and Saint Paul and the aforesaid Count and his son who will be the Count of Besalú and his inhabitants of San Paulo without any deceit to him or theirs.

It is possible that the last independent count of Besalú, the Bernard who married Ximena, daughter of Raymond Berengar III, Count of Barcelona, with the acknowledgement that if he died without heirs his county would pass to Raymond, was Bernard II. The very existence of a third count Bernard, succeeding Bernard II, has been called into question.
