= Ava of Cerdanya =

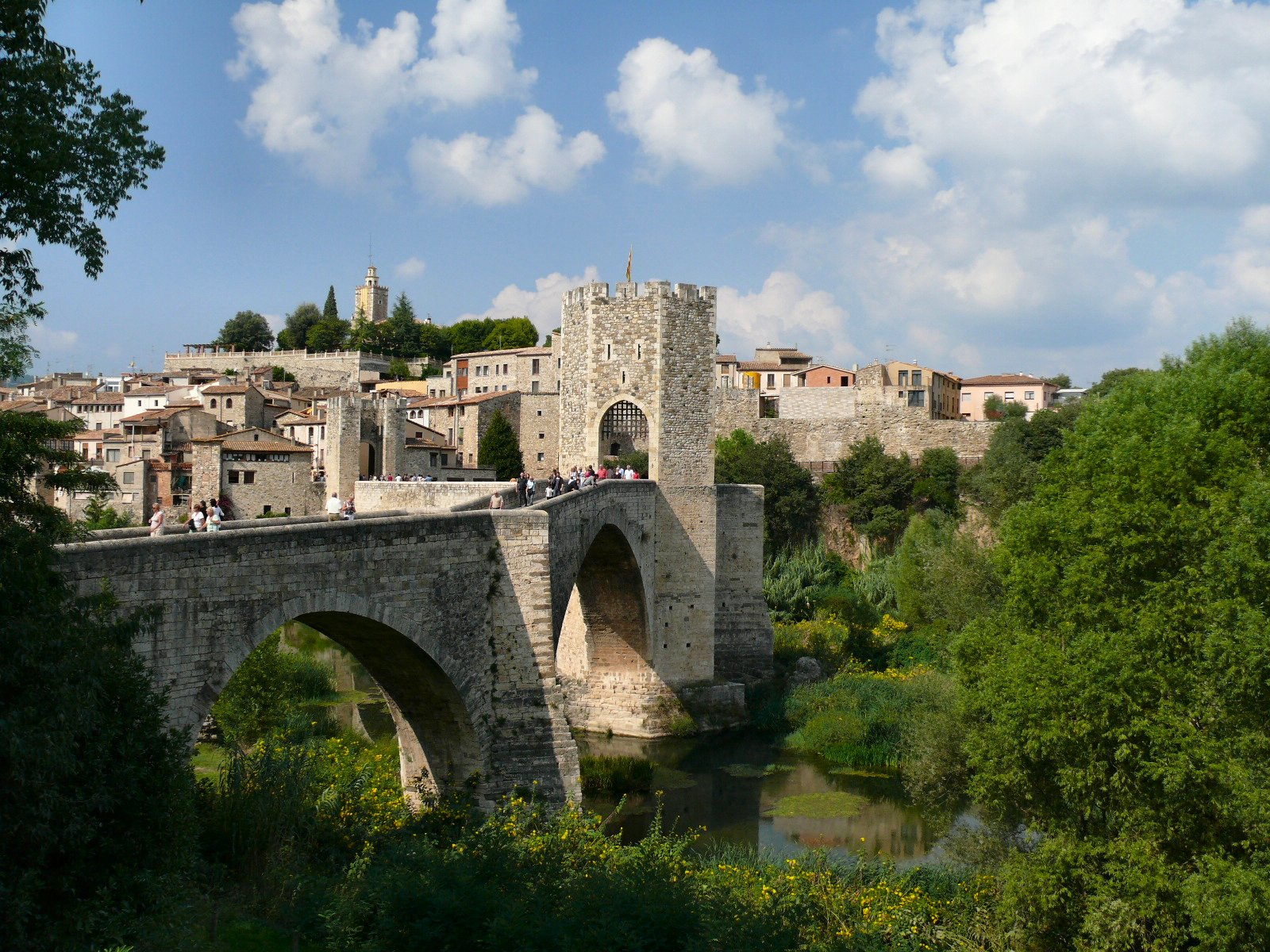
The old village of Besalù, seen from the road. Taken at Besalù, Catalonia, Spain, September 2009

Ava of Cerdanya (died 961) was countess consort of Cerdanya and Besalú. She ruled as regent during the minority of her sons from 927 until 941.

== Life ==
The origin of Ava is unconfirmed. She has been suggested to be the daughter of a local aristocrat named Fidel, or Bernard Unifred, or Acfred of Carcassonne, a member of the Ribagorça family. Around the year 900, she married Miró II of Cerdanya and Besalú, with whom she had four sons, who all became counts, and a daughter:

- Sunifred II of Cerdanya (915–968), count of Cerdanya and count of Besalú
- Wilfred II of Besalú (?-957), count of Besalú
- Miró III of Cerdanya (920–984), count of Cerdanya and Besalú, and bishop of Girona
- Oliba Cabreta (920–990), count of Cerdanya, Besalú, and count of Ripoll
- Fredeburga of Cerdanya, abbess of the Monastery of Sant Joan de les Abadesses

Upon the death of her spouse in 927, she ruled the county as a regent for their children, who were still minors. During her regency, she was forced to handle repeated rebellions of the local aristocracy, who attempted to take control of the counties and take advantage of the presumed weakness of a minor regency government. In 941, she gave her children their own fiefs, and it is assumed that this marked the end of her own mandate as regent. After this point, her presence in official state documents gradually diminished. She never ceased to be involved in the business transactions of the fortune of her late spouse: in accordance with her marriage contract, she had the right to a part of the state fortune for the rest of her life as long as she stayed a widow.

Her actions left their mark in many donations made to various ecclesiastical institutions: Saint-Michel-de-Cuxa (941, 953, 962), Ripoll, Elne (962), and Camprodon (944).
