= Oliba Cabreta =

Spanish noble and count of Cerdanya and count of Besalú (c.920-990)

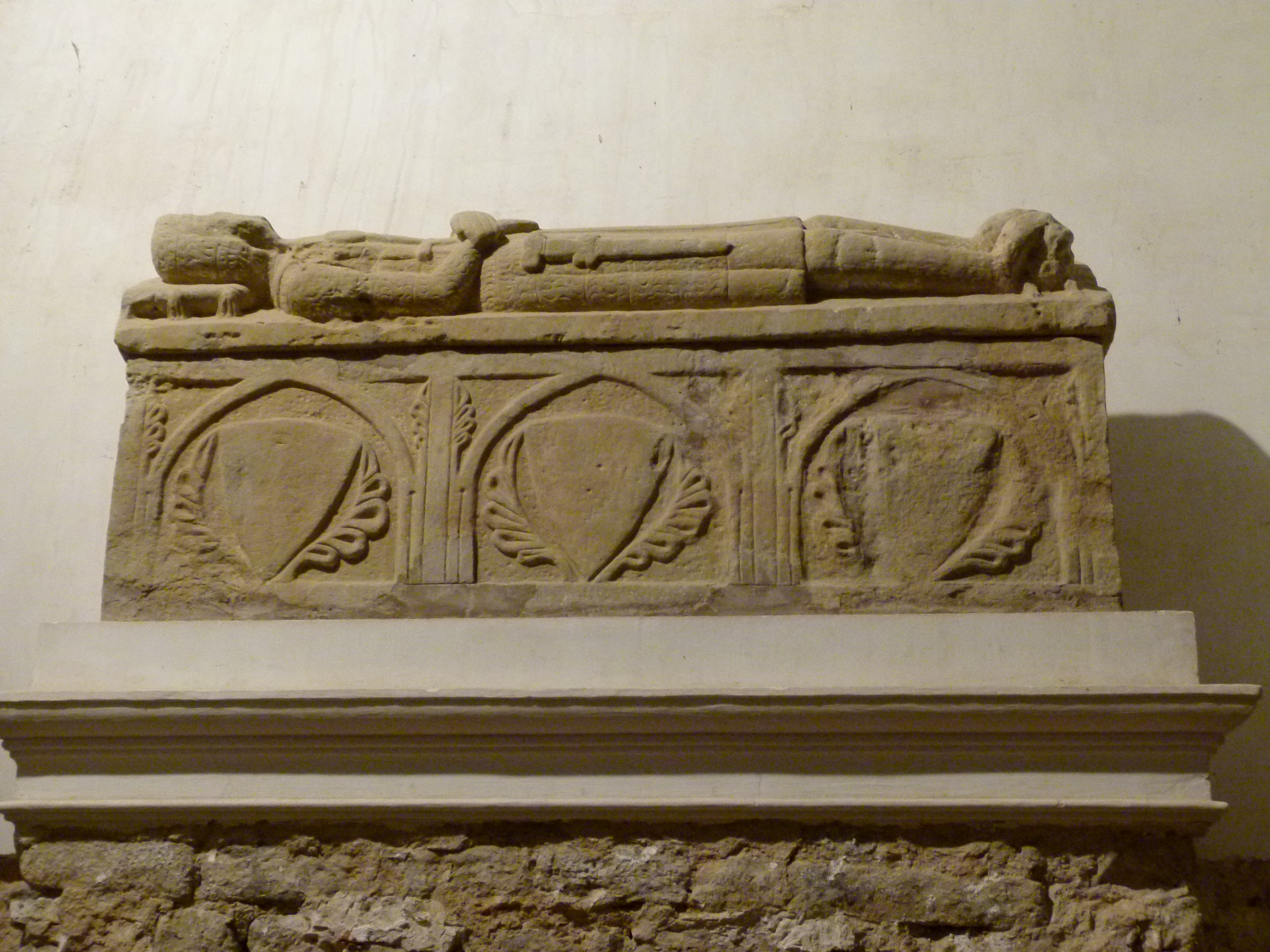
Sarcòfag del comte Oliba Cabreta

Oliba Cabreta (c. 920 – 990) was the count of Cerdanya from 965 and count of Besalú from 984 until his abdication in 988.

== Life ==
He was the fourth son of Miró II and Ava. He inherited Cerdanya from his eldest brother Sunifred II and Besalú from his elder brother Miró III. He was originally under the tutelage of his mother from his father's death in 927.

During his tenure, he added Berga and Ripoll to his domains. In 979, Roger I of Carcassonne ceded Capcir to him. A short time later (between 979-981), some nobles from the castles of Viver and Estela led an uprising against her, which was quickly suppressed. In 984, he assumed the direction of all his father's counties when his last brother died without heirs.

Oliba travelled twice to Rome, first in 968 with the Abbot Garin of Cuixà and second in 988 on his journey to Montecassino, the monastery to which he retired. He divided his lands among his three eldest sons: Bernard received Besalú and Ripoll, Wilfred received Cerdanya, and Oliba received Berga. His fourth son, Berengar, became bishop of Elne. He also had a legitimate daughter named Adelaide, who married John d'Oriol, lord of Sales. By his mistress, Ingeberga de Besora, he had a daughter named Ingeberga who became abbess of Sant Joan de Ripoll. His wife Ermengard of Empúries, daughter of Count Gausbert, acted as regent for his sons and he lived out his days in Italy until 990.

== Issue ==
He had issue:

- Bernard I, Count of Besalú (died 1020)
- Wifred II, Count of Cerdanya c. 970-1050
- Abbot Oliba c. 971–1046
- Berengar, became bishop of Elne
- Adelaida, married John d'Oriol, lord of Sales

Preceded by Sunifred II	Count of Cerdanya; 968–988	Succeeded by Wilfred II
Preceded by Miró III	Count of Besalú; 984–988	Succeeded by Bernard I
