= Radulf of Besalú =

Radulf (died 920) was a Count of Besalú. He was the younger son of Sunifred I, Count of Barcelona, and thus a brother of Wilfred the Hairy and Miró the Elder.

In 878, Wilfred separated the pagus of Besalú from the County of Girona and granted it to him as a county on the condition that it would continue in the descendants of Wilfred. On Radulf's death, Besalú passed to Miró II of Cerdanya the Younger, Wilfred's son.
