= Ermengarda de Vallespir =

Countess of Pallars and regent of Cerdanya (died 1001)

Ermengarda de Vallespir (died 1001) was a Spanish countess consort of Pallars by marriage to Oliba Cabreta and regent of the County of Cerdanya from 990 to 994 in co-regency with her sons Bernard I, Count of Besalú, Wifred II, Count of Cerdanya and Abbot Oliba.

== Life ==
Ermengarda was daughter of Gausbert, Count of Empúries. She married count Oliba Cabreta in 966. With her spouse, she made many donations to convents. In 988, Oliba retired to a convent, and in 990, he died. Oliba divided his domain among his three sons, and Ermengard acted as their regent in accordance with the terms of her marriage contract. In 991, she became involved in a conflict with the bishop Sal la d'Urgell.

In 993, her three sons attained full authority of their domains, and by 994, Ermengarda had retired to Vallespir. She governed Vallespir with full authority as her own fief. She is known to be dead in 14 February 1001.

Issue

- Bernard I, Count of Besalú
- Wifred II, Count of Cerdanya
- Abbot Oliba
- Adelaida, married John d'Oriol, lord of Sales
