= Jordi Bolòs =

Spanish historian

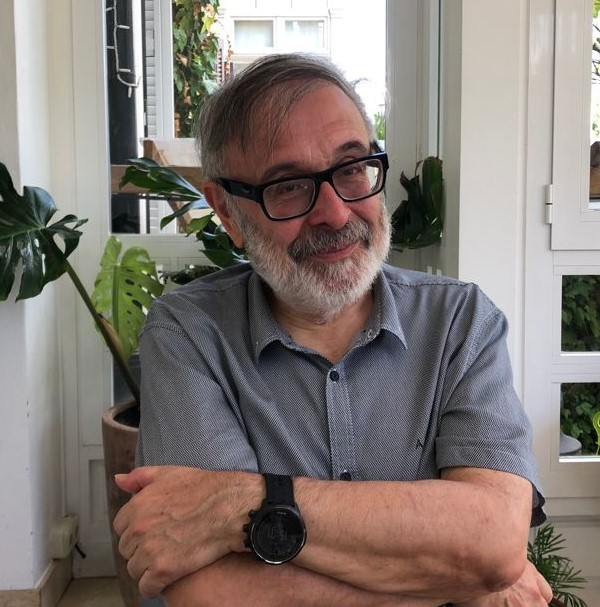
Jordi Bolòs

Jordi Bolòs i Masclans (Barcelona, 1955) is Professor of Medieval History at the University of Lleida. Rural Catalan history, urban history and the landscape history (The medieval origins of the Catalan landscape) has focussed his research in the study of the medieval society. He has published several historical atlases of the Carolingian counties of Besalú, Empúries-Peralada, Girona, Osona, Manresa, Urgell and Roussillon, Conflent, Vallespir and Fenouillèdes. Editor of the publication Territori i societat a l’edat mitjana.

== Main publications ==
- Com veieren els Països Catalans alguns viatgers del segle XVI, Rafael Dalmau Editor, Barcelona, 1980. ISBN 84-232-0175-9.
- Els molins fariners, Ketres, Barcelona, 1983 (with J. Nuet). ISBN 84-85256-30-1.
- La granja cistercenca d'Ancosa (La Llacuna, Anoia). Estudi dels edificis i dels materials trobats durant les excavacions (1981–1983), Generalitat de Catalunya, Barcelona, 1986 (with L. Mallart). ISBN 84-393-0464-1.
- Atlas Històric d'Andorra (759-1278), Andorra, 1987(with V. Hurtado). ISBN 978-9991390017.
- Paisatge i societat a la Plana de Lleida a l'Edat Mitjana, Lleida, 1993. ISSN 0214-445X.
- Repertori d'Antropònims Catalans (RAC) I, I.E.C, Barcelona, 1994 (with Josep Moran). ISBN 84-7283-277-5.
- El mas, el pagès i el senyor. Paisatge i societat en una parròquia de la Garrotxa a l'edat mitjana, Curial, Barcelona, 1995. ISBN 84-88645-98-8.
- Un mas pirinenc medieval. Vilosiu B (Cercs, Berguedà). Estudi dels edificis i materials trobats durant les excavacions (1984–1986), Universitat de Lleida, Lleida, 1996. ISBN 84-88645-98-8.
- Castells de la Catalunya central, Angle, Manresa, 1997. ISBN 84-88811-32-2.
- Atles del comtat de Besalú (785-988), Rafael Dalmau, Barcelona, 1998 (with V. Hurtado). ISBN 84-232-0520-7.
- Atles dels comtats d'Empúries i Peralada (780-991), Rafael Dalmau, Barcelona, 1999 (with V. Hurtado). ISBN 84-232-0604-1.
- La vida quotidiana a Catalunya en l'època medieval, Edicions 62, Barcelona, 2000. ISBN 84-297-4773-7.
- Diccionari de la Catalunya medieval (segles VI-XV), Edicions 62, Barcelona, 2000. ISBN 84-297-4706-0.
- Catalunya medieval. Una aproximació al territori i a la societat a l'edat mitjana, Pòrtic, Barcelona, 2000. ISBN 84-7306-575-1.
- Atles del comtat de Girona (795-993), Rafael Dalmau, Barcelona, 2000 (with V. Hurtado). ISBN 84-232-0614-9.
- Atles del comtat d'Osona (798-993), Rafael Dalmau, Barcelona, 2001 (with V. Hurtado). ISBN 84-232-0632-7.
- Cartografia i història medieval, IEI, Lleida, 2001. ISBN 84-89943-51-6.
- Paisatge i història en època medieval a la Catalunya Nova. Organització del territori i societat a la vila d'Agramunt (Urgell) i a la vall del Sió (segles V-XIX), Lleida, 2002 (editor). ISBN 84-8409-137-6.
- Els orígens medievals del paisatge català. L'arqueologia del paisatge com a font per a conèixer la història de Catalunya, Barcelona, 2004. ISBN 84-7283-745-9.
- Atles del comtat de Manresa (798-993), Rafael Dalmau, Barcelona, 2004 (with V. Hurtado). ISBN 84-232-0665-3.
- Atles del comtat d'Urgell (v788-993), Rafael Dalmau, Barcelona, 2006 (with V. Hurtado). ISBN 84-232-0700-5.
- Diplomatari del monestir de Santa Maria de Serrateix (segles X-XV), Fundació Noguera, Barcelona, 2006. ISBN 84-9779-465-6.
- Estudiar i gestionar el paisatge històric medieval. Territori i Societat a l'edat mitjana, IV (2007), Universitat de Lleida, Lleida, 2007 (editor). ISBN 84-8409-137-6.
- Dins les muralles de la ciutat. Carrers i oficis a la Lleida dels segles XIV i XV. Pagès editors - Ajuntament de Lleida, Lleida, 2008. ISBN 978-84-9779-715-3
- Atles dels comtats de Rosselló, Conflent, Vallespir i Fenollet (750-991), Rafael Dalmau editor, Barcelona, 2009 (with V. Hurtado). ISBN 978-84-232-0734-3.
