= Miró III of Cerdanya =

Miró III of Cerdanya and II of Besalú, Bonfill (920 in Girona – 984), was count of Cerdanya and Besalú (968–984).

The third son of Miro II and Ava, he was the successor of his brother, Sunifred II of Cerdanya.

== Biography ==
He was first clergyman, then archdeacon (957), and finally bishop of Girona (970-984).

He traveled to Rome twice, and maintained a great friendship with Gerbert of Aurillac, the future Pope Sylvester II. He was a great writer, of a very particular style. He devoted his historical writings to recalling and praising the people in the families of the Catalan counts.

He authored the consecration of Saint-Michel-de-Cuxa in 974 and the Monastery of Ripoll in 977. Also founded the monastery of Santa Maria de Serrateix in 977 and the monastery of Sant Pere de Besalu in 978.

He was succeeded by his brother Oliba Cabreta in both counties, although Oliba Cabreta had ruled jointly in Cerdanya since 968.

Preceded by Sunifred II	Count of Cerdanya; Count of Besalu; 968-984	Succeeded by Oliba Cabreta
