= William II of Besalú =

William II (Catalan: Guillem II: died 1066/1070) was the Count of Besalú from 1052 until his death, co-reigning for a time with his brother, Bernard II. He is described as having an "angry and violent character", a "notoriously irascible" man. According to the twelfth-century Deeds of the Counts of Barcelona, he was nicknamed Trunnus (Catalan el Tro) because he wore a false nose, having presumably lost his nose in battle.

William was the eldest son and successor of William I "the Fat" and Adelaide. He married Stephanie, daughter of Count Geoffrey I of Provence. He had a son, Bernard III, and a daughter, Stephanie, who married Count Roger II of Foix.

William's reign was characterised by conflict with the church. He had to cede Bàscara to the bishopric of Girona. He associated his brother Bernard II, later his successor, with him as co-count. He was assassinated sometime between 1066 and 1070, and suspicion fell on his brother, who nonetheless succeeded to the county unopposed.

== Relations with Barcelona ==
Between 1054 and 1057, William formed an important alliance with Count Raymond Berengar I of Barcelona. This was probably initiated by Raymond, who was in a conflict with his influential grandmother, Ermessenda, and need allies.

On 11 September 1054, William attended a placitum (public court) in Barcelona. There he commended himself and swore an oath of fealty to Raymond, becoming his vassal for Besalú. This was supplemented by a written convention (convenientia) and three ancillary charters, in which William promised aid to Raymond and turned over the double castle of Finestres and the castle of Colltort, which had been granted to William's father by Raymond's father, Berengar Raymond I. William also promised that if he was wronged by anyone from the Raymond's counties of Barcelona, Girona or Osona, he would not take revenge, but would submit a complaint to Raymond and give him three months to obtain a judicial resolution. For this agreement to respect the peace of Raymond's counties, William pledged the castle of Finestres and La Guàrdia, with the castellans of the two castles standing as sureties to the agreement.

To seal the new alliance between Besalú and Barcelona, William agreed to marry Raymond Berengar's sister-in-law, Llúcia, daughter of Count Bernard I of La Marche. On 11 December 1054, William signed a scriptura dotis, a charter granting a dower to Llúcia. In accordance with the Liber iudiciorum, the Visigothic law still in effect in Catalonia, he granted Llúcia one tenth of all his possessions. That same day he also made what he called a scriptura donationis causa sponsalitii, a donation on the occasion of his betrothal, granting Llúcia the counties of Berga and Ripoll and all that pertained to them. This marriage never came to fruition.

In 1057, William and Raymond came to another agreement. This time William placed the castle of Colltort in pledge.

Preceded by William I	Count of Besalú; 1052–1066/70	Succeeded by Bernard II

== Sources ==
- Benito i Monclús, Pere; Taylor, Nathaniel L.; Kosto, Adam J. (1996). "Three Typological Approaches to Catalonian Archival Evidence, 10–12th Centuries". Anuario de Estudios Medievales. 26 (1): 43–88. doi:10.3989/aem.1996.v26.i1.687. hdl:10459.1/59028.
- Kosto, Adam J. (2001). Making Agreements in Medieval Catalonia: Power, Order, and the Written Word, 1000–1200. Cambridge: Cambridge University Press.
- Valls i Taberner, Ferran; Soldevila, Ferran (2002). Història de Catalunya. L'Abadia de Montserrat. ISBN 978-84-8415-434-1.
