= Sunifred II of Cerdanya =

Sunifred II of Cerdanya (915–968) was count of Cerdanya (927–968), Conflent (927–968), and Besalú (957–968).

== Origins ==
Son of Miró II of Cerdanya and Ava of Cerdanya, he inherited the county of Cerdanya from his father, and that of Besalú from his brother, Wilfred II of Besalú.

== Political life ==
In 927, on the death of his father, he received as an inheritance the counties of Cerdanya and Conflent. Until 941 the widowed countess Ava presided over him as regent.

In 951 he traveled to Rome, where he received by way of papal bulls a number of privileges for the monastery of Santa Maria de Ripoll and for Lagrasse Abbey. He promoted the construction of the church of Saint-Michel-de-Cuxa, consecrated in 953, and of the monastery. He also protected the monastery of Sant Pere de Rodes.

== Titles and successors ==
In 957 on the death of his brother Wilfred II of Besalú, he was appointed his brother's heir, thus once again uniting the dominions of his father under the same rule. In a revolt of his vassals he intervened to bring peace among them, decreeing the confiscation of rebel property. He died in Cuxa and was succeeded by his brother Miró III.

Preceded by Miró II	Count of Cerdanya; 927–968	Succeeded by Miró III
Preceded by Wilfred II	Count of Besalú; 957–968	Succeeded by Miró III
