= Sant Joan de les Abadesses =

- Municipality
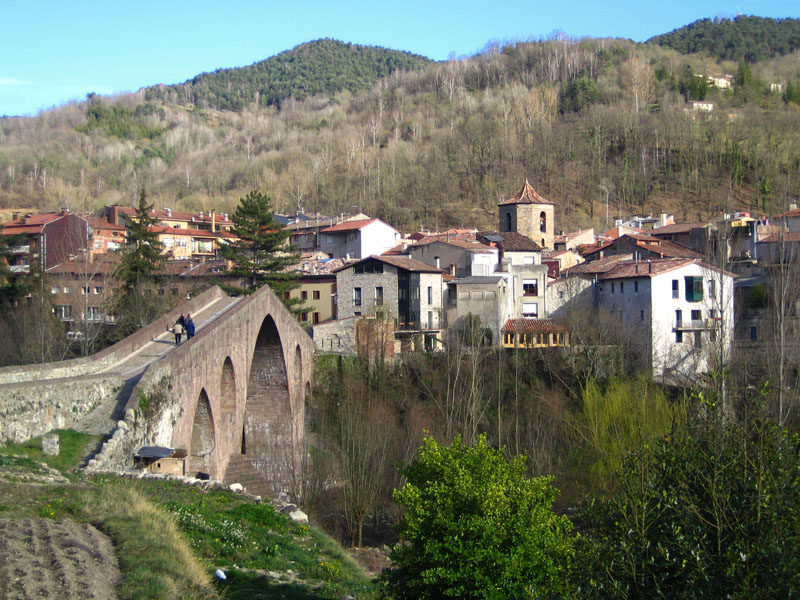

- Map showing location within Ripollès

- Location in Catalonia Sant Joan de les Abadesses (Spain)
- Coordinates: 42°14′10″N 2°17′12″E
- Country: Spain
- Community: Catalonia
- Province: Girona
- Comarca: Ripollès

Government
  - Mayor: Ramon Roque Riu (2015)

Area
  - Total: 53.7 km^{2} (20.7 sq mi)
- Elevation: 773 m (2,536 ft)

Population (2025-01-01)
  - Total: 3,393
  - Density: 63.2/km^{2} (164/sq mi)
- Demonym(s): Santjoaní, santjoanina
- Postal code: 17860
- Website: santjoandelesabadesses.cat

Sant Joan de les Abadesses (Catalan pronunciation: [ˈsaɲ ʒuˈan də ləz əβəˈðɛsəs]) is a town and municipality located in the south-east of the comarca of Ripollès, in the province of Girona, Catalonia, Spain.

It has an area of 53.7 km² and is located in a pre-Pyrenean valley along the course of the Ter river. The municipality has an important medieval heritage linked to the Monastery of Sant Joan de les Abadesses, around which the settlement originated and from which it takes its name.

== Geography and climate ==
The town is located in the upper course of the Ter, in the valley of the same name, with the Serra Cavallera mountain range to the north and the mountain of Sant Antoni to the south. It has a Mediterranean climate with continental influence, of eastern pre-Pyrenean type, with abundant rainfall (average annual values between 900 and 1,200 mm). Winters are cold, with average temperatures between 3°C and −3°C, and summers are mild, between 14°C and 20°C, with significant thermal variation in the valley. The municipal area is 79% forested, while 19% is used for crops.

== Economy ==
Most of the economy of Sant Joan de les Abadesses is centered on industry and manufacturing. However, there have more recently been increases in tourism to the town, with a corresponding increase in the service industry. Rural areas of the municipality are largely occupied by farms, usually raising cattle.

== History ==
=== Ancient times ===
Human settlement in the valley around Sant Joan de les Abadesses dates to prehistoric times, and archeological research has found evidence of settlements in the region from the Lower Paleolithic era.

It seems that the area was not very much Romanized, despite the fact that a branch of the Via Augusta went up the valley towards the Col d'Ares pass through the Pyrenee Mountains.

=== Middle Ages ===
The origins of the present town lie in the founding of the Monastery of Sant Joan de les Abadesses by Wilfred the Hairy in 887. This was one of the first nunneries founded in Catalonia, and its first abbess was Emma of Barcelona, daughter of Wilfred. The Benedictine community grew in wealth and importance throughout the 10th century. However, in 1017, the nuns, accused of violating the rules by which they were supposed to be living, were expelled in a bull by Pope Benedict VIII.

This expulsion initiated a period of instability that lasted until the re-establishment of canons of the order of Saint Augustine in the 12th century and with the patronage of Ramon Berenguer III. The new Augustinian monks largely rebuilt the monastery, including new churches for the monastery itself and the parish of Saint Pol. New cultural importance and splendor was brought to the monastery in this period, as evidenced by its extensive archive of troubadour songs from this era.

Around the monastery, the town of Sant Joan was founded. Initially, the laypeople lived around the Church of Sant Pol, in the neighborhood today known as El Raval. But the town's growing population necessitated the construction of a walled town (the Vila Vella) on land that had been known as El Vinyal. This part of the town was home to numerous medieval guilds.

As time passed, power in the town shifted from religious to secular. The town became a Carlist capital, and suffered the consequences of wars with nearby France, as well as industrialization and social change.

=== Contemporary era ===
In the mid-19th century, coal mining began in Ogassa, precipitating the construction of a railroad from Sant Joan to Barcelona. The railroad was finished on 17 October 1880. This accelerated the town's growth and industrialization. Like other towns along the Ter River, numerous factories and industrial colonies were built to take advantage of hydrological power from the river. A native citizen of the town introduced concrete to the Iberian Peninsula, and the town itself pioneered concrete manufacturing.

During the Spanish Civil War of the 1930s, the town renamed itself Puig-Alt de Ter (High-Hill of the Ter). As the forces of Republican Spain retreated towards the French border, many passed through the town. However, Republican soldiers destroyed bridges and the train station as they passed, to cover their retreat. After the war, the town recovered and diversified its industries.

== Main sights ==
- Monastery of Sant Joan de les Abadesses, founded in the late 9th century, with the current Romanesque complex built in the 12th century.
- Pont Vell, or "Old Bridge", built in the medieval era and in the Gothic style.
- Vila Vella, planned city built in the 13th century. It conserves its street layout, Main Square, and several houses from the 17th century.
- Remains of the Medieval walls, including two extant towers, and parts of the wall itself.
- "Way of Iron and Coal" (Ruta de Ferro i Carbó), a rail trail along the former railroad bed.

== Twin towns ==
- Le Palais-sur-Vienne (France)
- San Luis Potosí (Mexico)
