= Monastery of Sant Joan de les Abadesses =

Monastery in Catalonia, Spain

Coordinates: 42°14′03″N 2°17′10″E

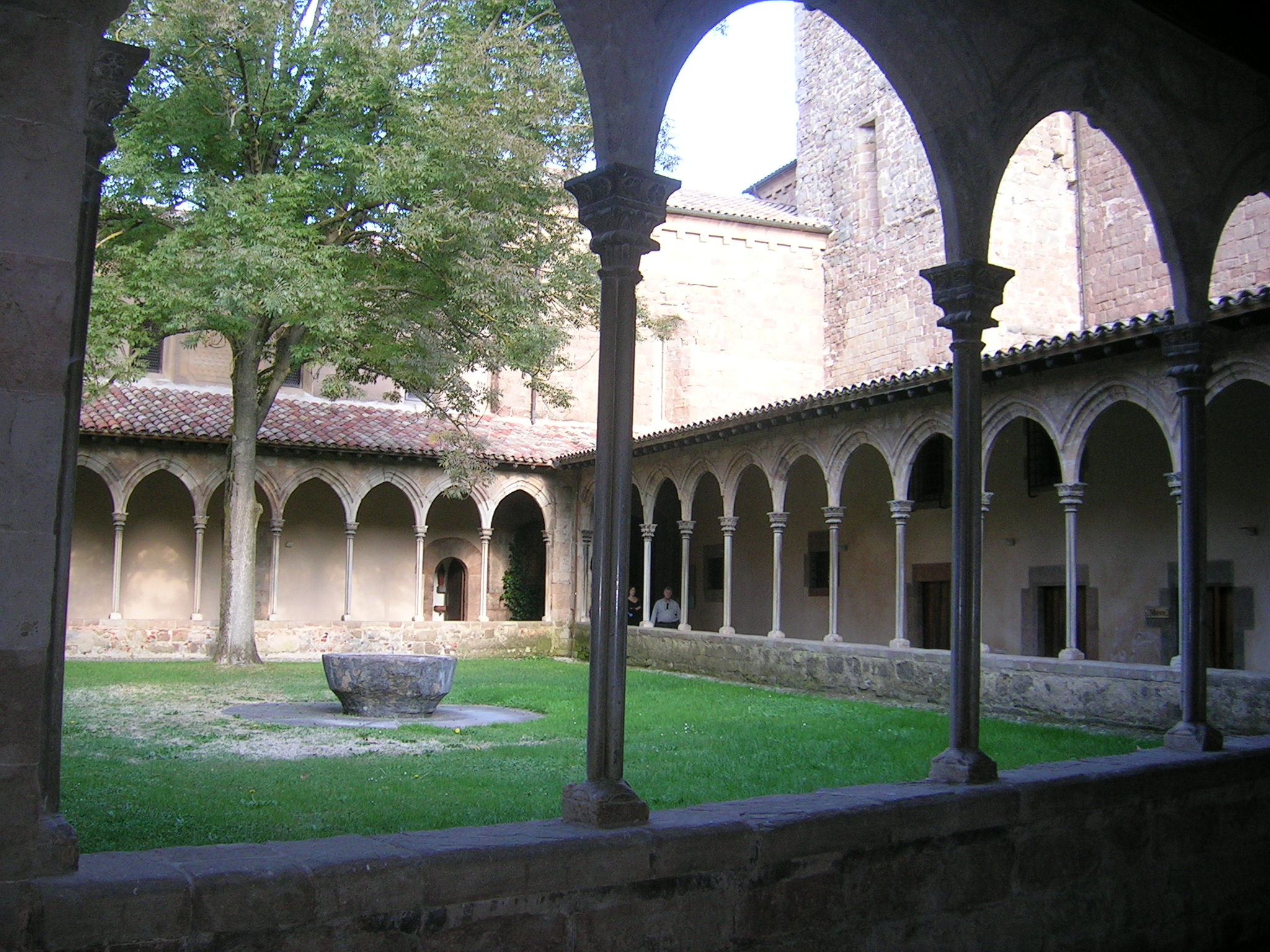
Cloister of the monastery.

The Monastery of Sant Joan de les Abadesses is a monastery in the comarca of Ripollès, Catalonia, northern Spain. Until the year 945 it was the only female monastery in the area.

== History ==
The monastery was founded in 885 by count Wilfred the Hairy, who destined it to the education of his daughter Emma, who later became the first abbess. Wilfred had previously founded the monastery of Santa Maria de Ripoll for his son Radulf.

The church was consecrated on 24 June 887 by the bishop of Vic. In 1017, by request of Bernard I of Besalú, a papal bull suppressed the nunnery; Bernard acquired them, and brought into the monastery (now part of the bishopric of Besalú) a community of monks. From 1083 to 1114 it was under the Monastery of St. Victor of Marseille, who sent here a community of nuns of Greek origin. In 1114 the intervention of the Pope allowed a community of Augustinian canons to take possession of the monastery in a definitive way. Ruled by local abbots until 1484, later it was under commendatory abbots. In 1592 the monastery was secularized and converted into a simple collegiate, suppressed in 1856. It was declared a Historical Monument in 1931.

== Architecture ==
The current church building date to the 12th century. In 1428 an earthquake destroyed the dome and the bell tower, and damaged the church, which was largely restored.

The church has a single nave, included into a wide transept. The latter opens to five apses. It houses the altarpiece of the White Virgin, executed in 1343 by Florentine artists and the Baroque chapel of the Pains, which is home to a "Pietà" by Josep Viladomat. Due to its original location in the middle of the monastery, the transept once give access to both the female and the male sectors of the abbey.

The sculptural complex of the "Descension", dating to c. 1250, is considered one of the most outstanding examples of Romanesque sculpture in Catalonia.

The monastery has also kept a small 15th century cloister in Gothic style, with two floors, as well as an Abbot palace, dating to the same century.

== Sources ==
- Pladevall, Antoni (1970). Els monestirs catalans. Barcelona: Ediciones Destino. ISBN 84-233-0511-2.
- Rabuñal, Anxo (1995). Imatges de Catalunya. Madrid: El País-Aguilar. ISBN 84-03-59631-6.
