= Sant Pere, Camprodon =

Benedictine monastery in Camprodon, Ripollès, Catalonia, Spain

Coordinates: 42.314306°N 2.369444°E

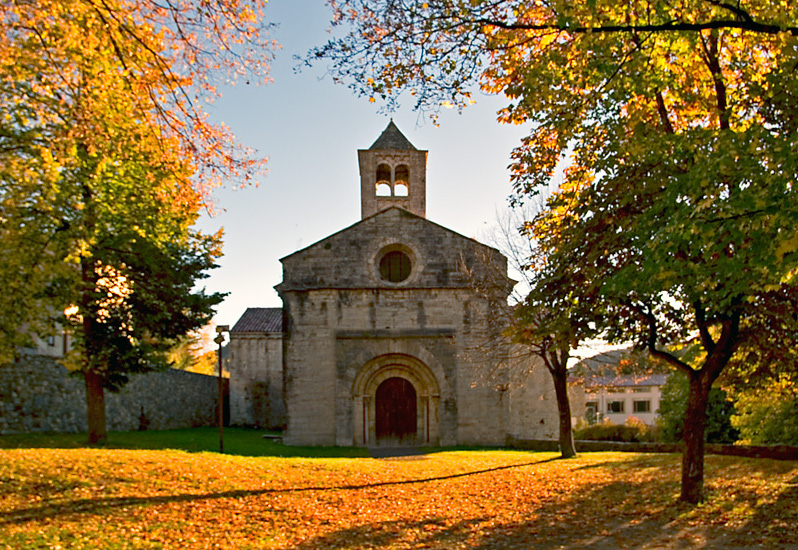
Sant Pere de Camprodon

Sant Pere de Camprodon is a Benedictine monastery in Camprodon, Ripollès, Catalonia, Spain. It was declared a Bien de Interés Cultural landmark in 1931.

== History ==
In 1932 the remains of the old monastery, which were in ruins, were demolished. Only the old monastery church has been preserved.

== Architecture and fittings ==
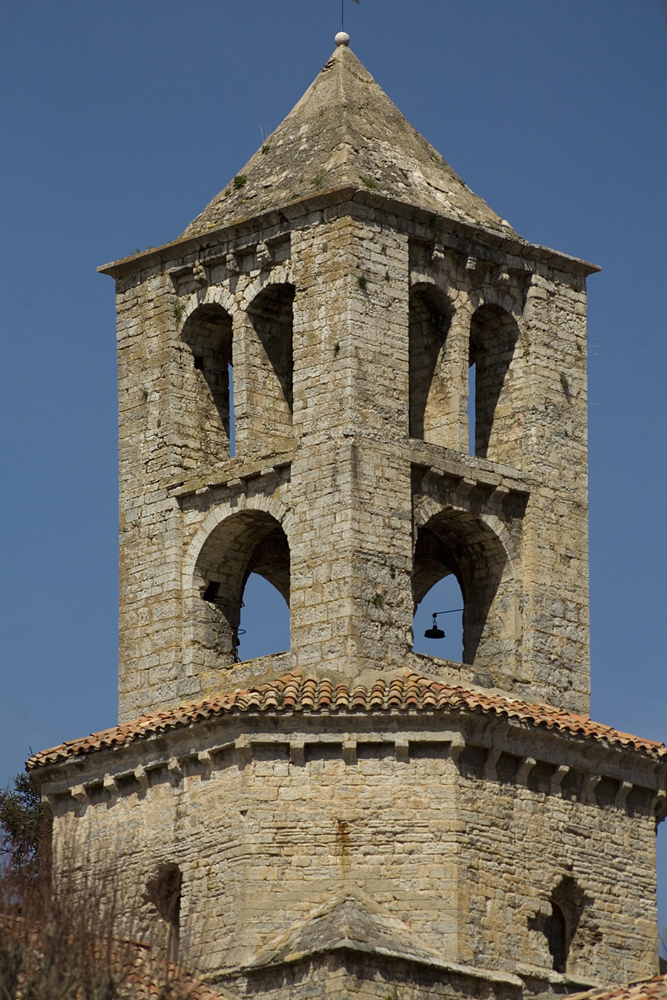
Tower

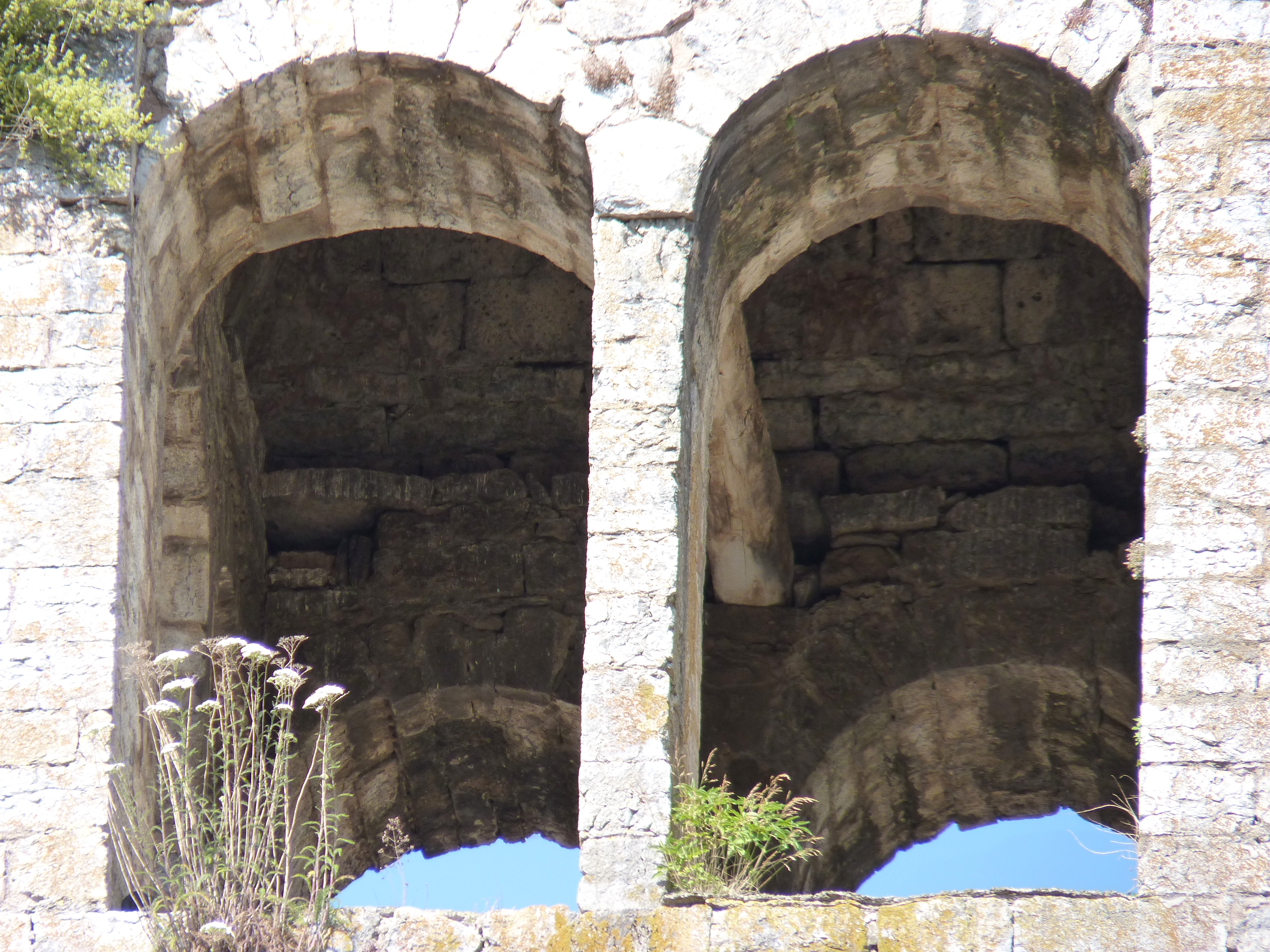
Arches

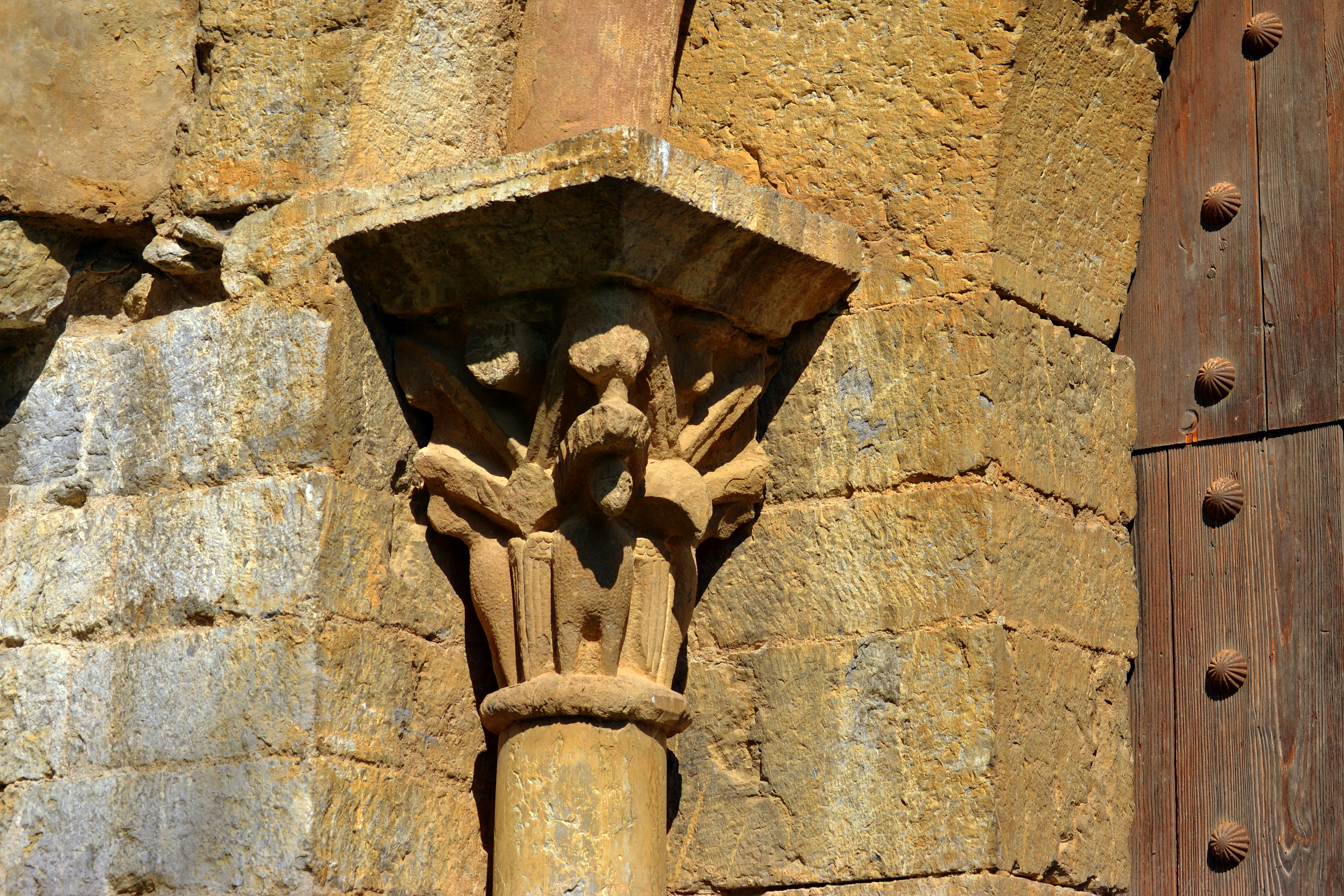
Capital

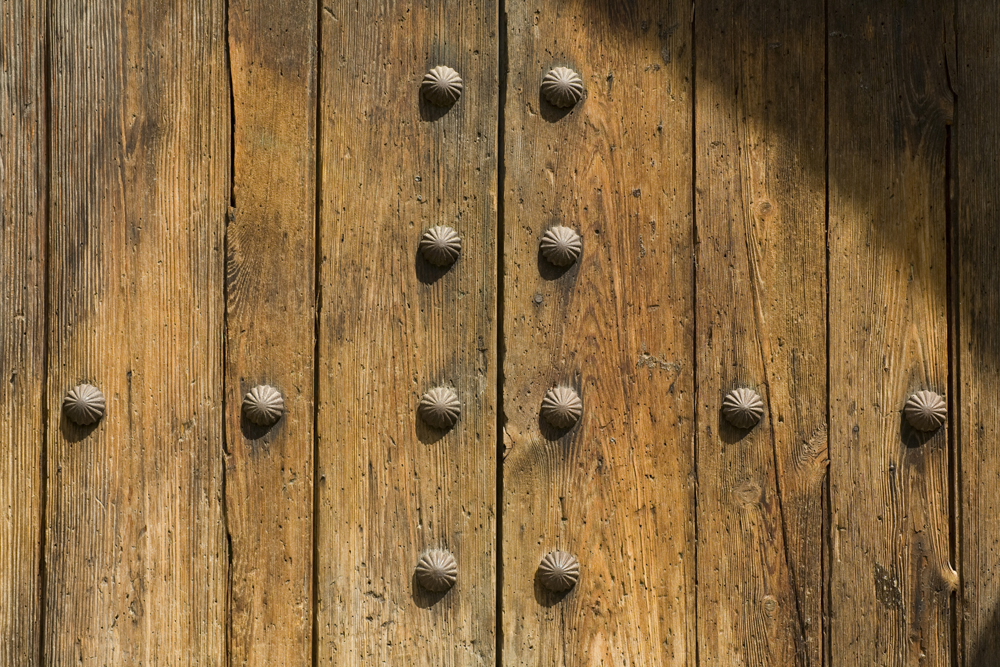
Door detailing

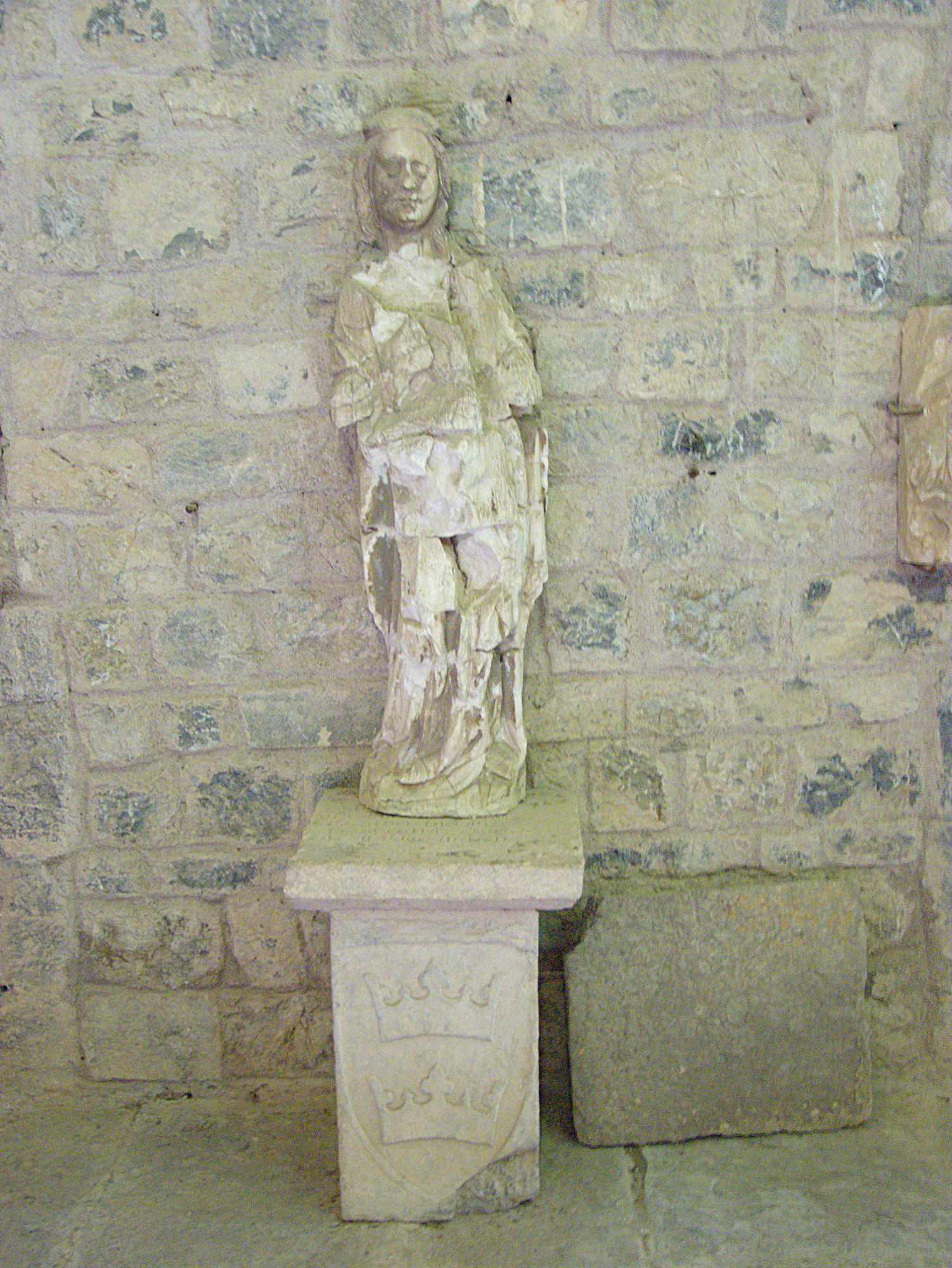
Statuary

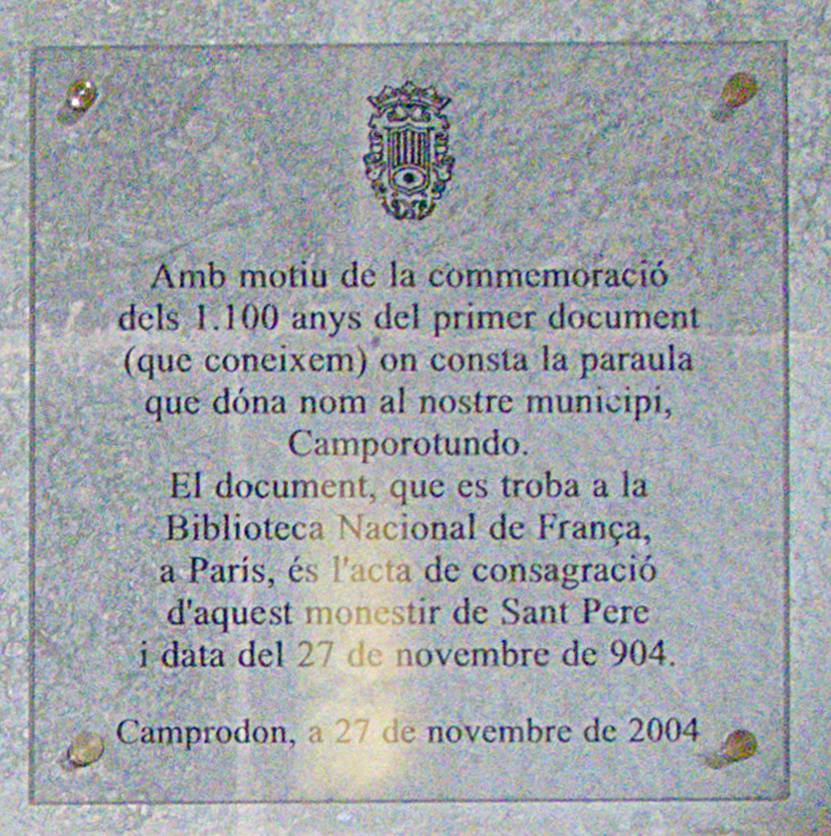
Commemorative plaque

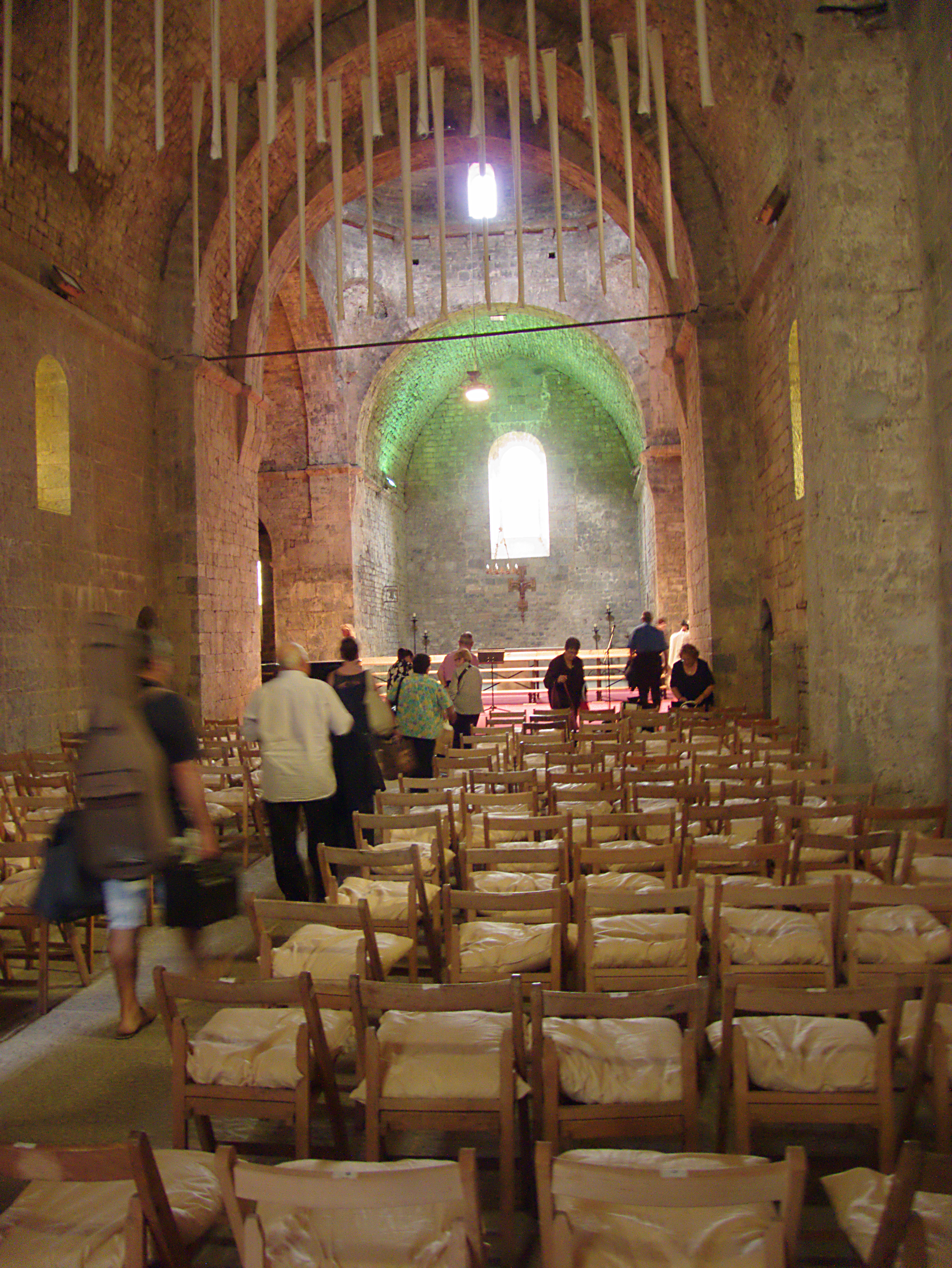
Interior view of the monastery church

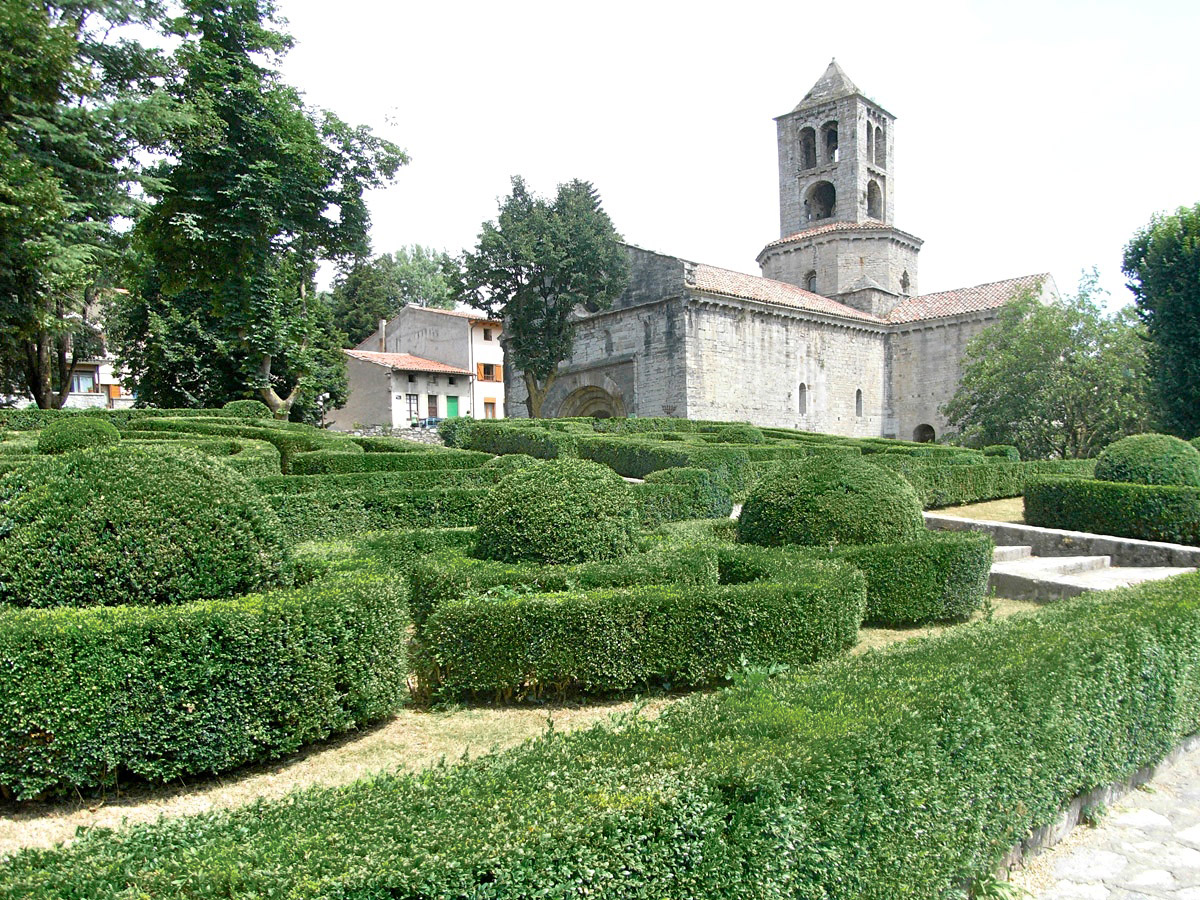
Grounds

It was built in the mid-12th century with the only ornamentation being that of the porch, decorated with columns and capitals. Its plan is a Latin cross, with four square apses. The largest of these has the same width as the nave while remaining open to the sides of the transept. The roof of the nave is a pointed arch supported on arches. On the cross plan, the transept rises to the dome which over which exists a bell tower, two stories high. The dome is covered on the outside by an octagonal lantern. The interior contains the remains of the tombs of some of the abbots. In the diocesan museum of Girona are also preserved some of the ancient capitals from the cloister.

== Abbots ==
| Period | Name |
|---|---|
| 948-957 | |
| 963-966 | |
| 966-969 | |
| 976-991 | Dodó |
| 1003-1006 | Delan |
| 1013- | Odó |
| 1016-1042 | Bonfill |
| 1067- | Bernat |
| 1074-1102 | Berenguer |
| 1106-1112 | Pere |
| 1113- | Miquel |
| 1118-1121 | Gregori |
| 1122-1130 | Pere |
| 1132- | Esteve |
| 1137- | Bernat |
| 1139-1141 | Vidal |
| 1143- | Berenguer |
| 1165-1169 | Pere |
| 1170-1187 | Bernat de Sesguisoles |
| 1187-1195 | Guiu |
| 1195- | Robert |
| 1196-1209 | Bernat |
| 1209-1220 | Berenguer de Rocams |
| 1220- | Ramon |
| 1222- | Robert de Bastida |
| 1223-1226 | Berenguer |
| 1227- | Pere |
| 1229- | Guiu |
| 1230-1235 | Berenguer de Maçanet |
| 1235- | Bernat Desbach |
| 1238- | Bernat de Milhaud |
| 1240-1249 | Pere de Corts |
| 1249-1255 | Guiu |
| 1256-1268 | Mateu |
| 1268-1270 | Guillem |
| 1270- | Pere |
| 1273-1311 | Guillem Oller |
| 1311- | Francesc |
| 1313- | Berenguer Pla |
| 1313-1316 | Hug |
| 1316-1322 | Ramon |
| 1323- | Arnau |
| 1324-1325 | Gispert |
| 1325-1348 | Ramon de Guixà |
| 1348-1361 | Bernat de Folcrà |
| 1361-1363 | Francesc d'Olina |
| 1363-1368 | Francesc |
| 1371-1397 | Pere |
| 1397-1400 | Jaume |
| 1401-1416 | Pere |
| 1416-1419 | Jaume |
| 1422-1425 | Berenguer |
| 1425-1463 | Pere de Sanadal |
| 1470-1514 | Bernat Esteve |
| 1515-1518 | Francesc de Remolins |
| 1518-1539 | Joan Pasqual |
| 1544-1560 | Antoni Llorenç Valentí |
| 1560-1573 | Carles Domènech |
| 1574-1593 | Bernat de Cardona i de Queralt |
| 1597-1606 | Jeroni de Tort |
| 1606-1615 | Felip Jordi |
| 1615-1620 | Antoni Carmona |
| 1620-1627 | Francesc Llordat |
| 1627-1629 | Jaume Busquets |
| 1630-1640 | Pere de Finot |
| 1640-1643 | Andreu Pont |
| 1643-1645 | Francesc Monfart |
| 1645-1676 | Josep de Magarola i de Grau |
| 1677-1684 | Benet Rocabertí |
| 1685-1695 | Baltasar Muntaner |
| 1695-1706 | Genadi Colom |
| 1710-1735 | Galderic Sanjust |
| 1735-1743 | Francesc de Copons |
| 1746-1749 | Pere Trellas |
| 1780-1785 | Ignasi de Francolí |
| 1786-1801 | Joaquim de Parrella |
| 1802-1805 | Baltasar Baldrich |
| 1825-1835 | Miquel de Parrella |
