= Besalú =

- Municipality
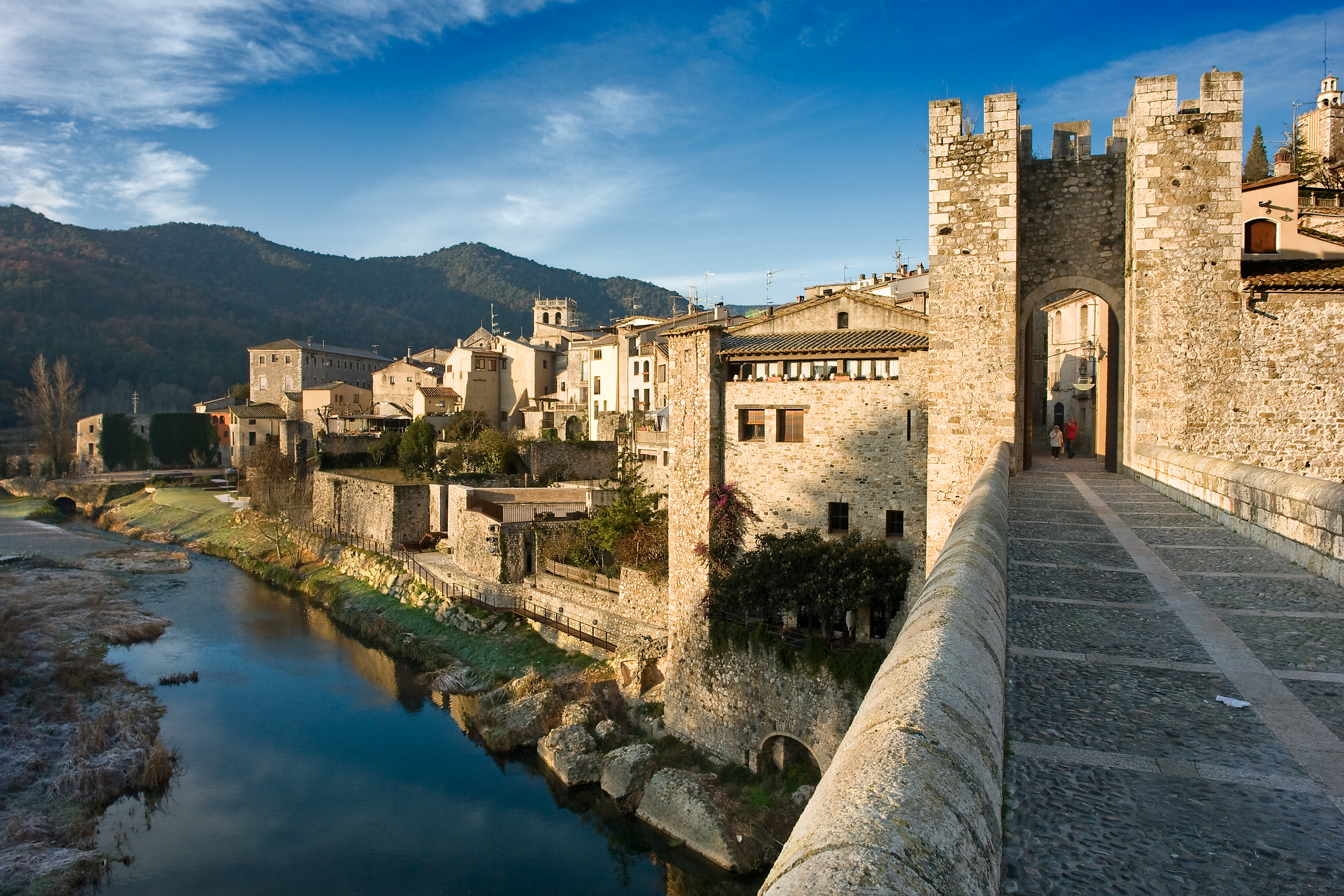

- Flag Coat of arms

- Location in Catalonia Besalú (Spain)
- Coordinates: 42°12′N 2°42′E
- Country: Spain
- Community: Catalonia
- Province: Girona
- Comarca: Garrotxa

Government
  - Mayor: Lluís Guinó Subirós (2015)

Area
  - Total: 4.9 km^{2} (1.9 sq mi)
- Elevation: 151 m (495 ft)

Population (2025-01-01)
  - Total: 2,592
  - Density: 530/km^{2} (1,400/sq mi)
- Demonym: Besaluenc
- Postal code: 17850
- Website: www.besalu.cat

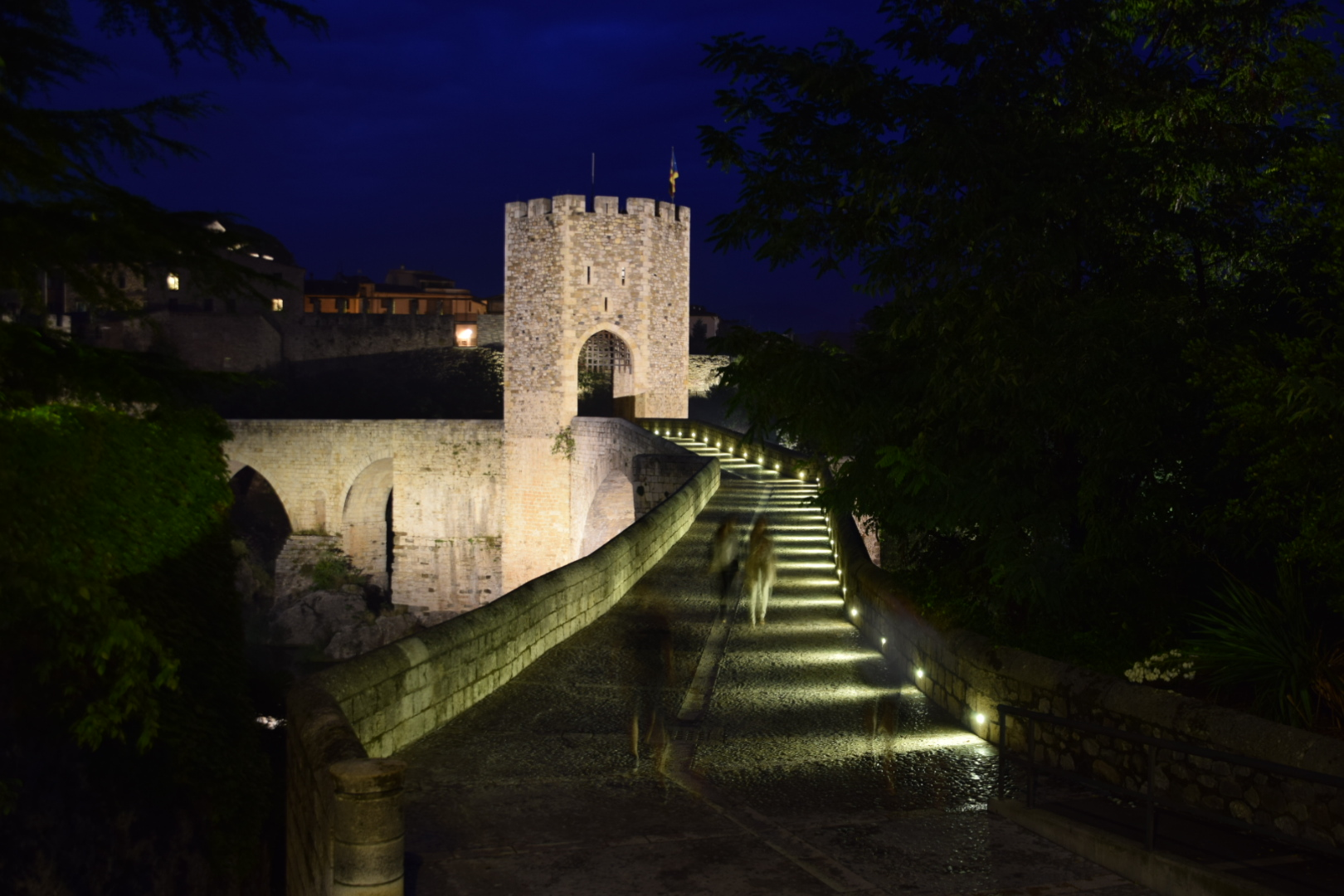
The Besalu bridge by night

Besalú (Catalan pronunciation: [bəzəˈlu]) is a town in the comarca of Garrotxa, in Girona, Catalonia, Spain.

The town's importance was greater in the early Middle Ages, as capital of the county of Besalú, whose territory was roughly the same size as the current comarca of Garrotxa but sometime extended as far as Corbières, Aude, in France. Wilfred the Hairy, credited with the unification of Catalonia, was Count of Besalú. The town was also the birthplace of Raimon Vidal, a medieval troubadour.

Besalú was designated as a historical national property ("conjunt històric-artístic") in 1966. The town's most significant feature is its 12th-century Romanesque bridge over the Fluvià river, which features a gateway at its midpoint. The church of Sant Pere was consecrated in 1003. The town features arcaded streets and squares and also a restored mikveh, a ritual Jewish bath dating from the eleventh or twelfth century, as well as the remains of a medieval synagogue, located in the lower town near the river. Besalú also hosts the Museum of miniatures created by jeweler and art collector Lluís Carreras.

== History ==
The name Besalú is derived from the Latin Bisuldunum, meaning a fort on a mountain between two rivers. It is also the historical capital of the county of “La Garrotxa”. One key date is the year 894, when Besalú was converted to a county with its own dynasty. The county changed from “L’Empordà” to “El Ripollès”. In the year 1111, Besalú lost its independence, for historical reasons in favor of the county of Barcelona. Centuries later, Besalú started a decadent period, worsened by the redemptions, wars with the French and carlists.

In 1966, Besalú was declared a site of historical and artistic importance.

== Monument ==
The monument is circled by the ancient wall from the c. XII-XIV. Unfortunately only parts of the original walls still exist. The urban configuration of the site is almost identical to the original layout. Without a doubt, the Medieval bridge is the emblem of the town, of an angular design with seven uneven arcs and two towers. The part of the town nearest to the bridge there are many narrow streets that belong to the ancient Jewish quarter. It is in this area where you will find the Miqvé, the purification bath, which date from c. XII, and demonstrate the presence of an important Jewish community. It is the only Romanesque mikvah still remaining in Spain. The street from the medieval bridge leads to the Town Square “Plaça Major”, a square whose arcades date from c. XVI, and used to be the centre of the medieval town.

Important buildings are the Local Government “Ajuntament” dating from c. XVII, the Royal Curia “Cúria Reial”, dating from c. XIV, and the "Casa Tallaferro". The street “Tallaferro” leads to the entrance to the Castle precinct. Inside the precinct there remains one of the towers from the ancient County Castle, and the apse of Saint Mary “Santa Maria” that dates from c. XI. Along with the street “Portalet” these are the remains which best retain the medieval appearance, along with panoramic views of the Roman Bridge.

Leading up from the main street “Carrer Major”, there are the “Casa Romà” (c. XIV) and the parish church of Saint Vincent “Sant Vicenç” dating from c. XI-XII which has very sculpturesque doors and windows. Near to the main Town Square, there is the “Prat de Sant Pere”, wide and spacious which used to be the Cemetery of the Benedictine monastery of Saint Peter “Sant Pere”. Today there only remains the three-nave church and one apse, dating from the c. XI. Also there is the small chapel of Saint James “Sant Jaume” (c. XII) and the “Casa Cornellà” (Llaudes) dating from c. XII and which has a patio with three galleries. Behind the monastery there is the church of the hospital of Saint Julian “Sant Julià”, with one nave and no apse, dating from c. XII, and an outstanding entrance portal.

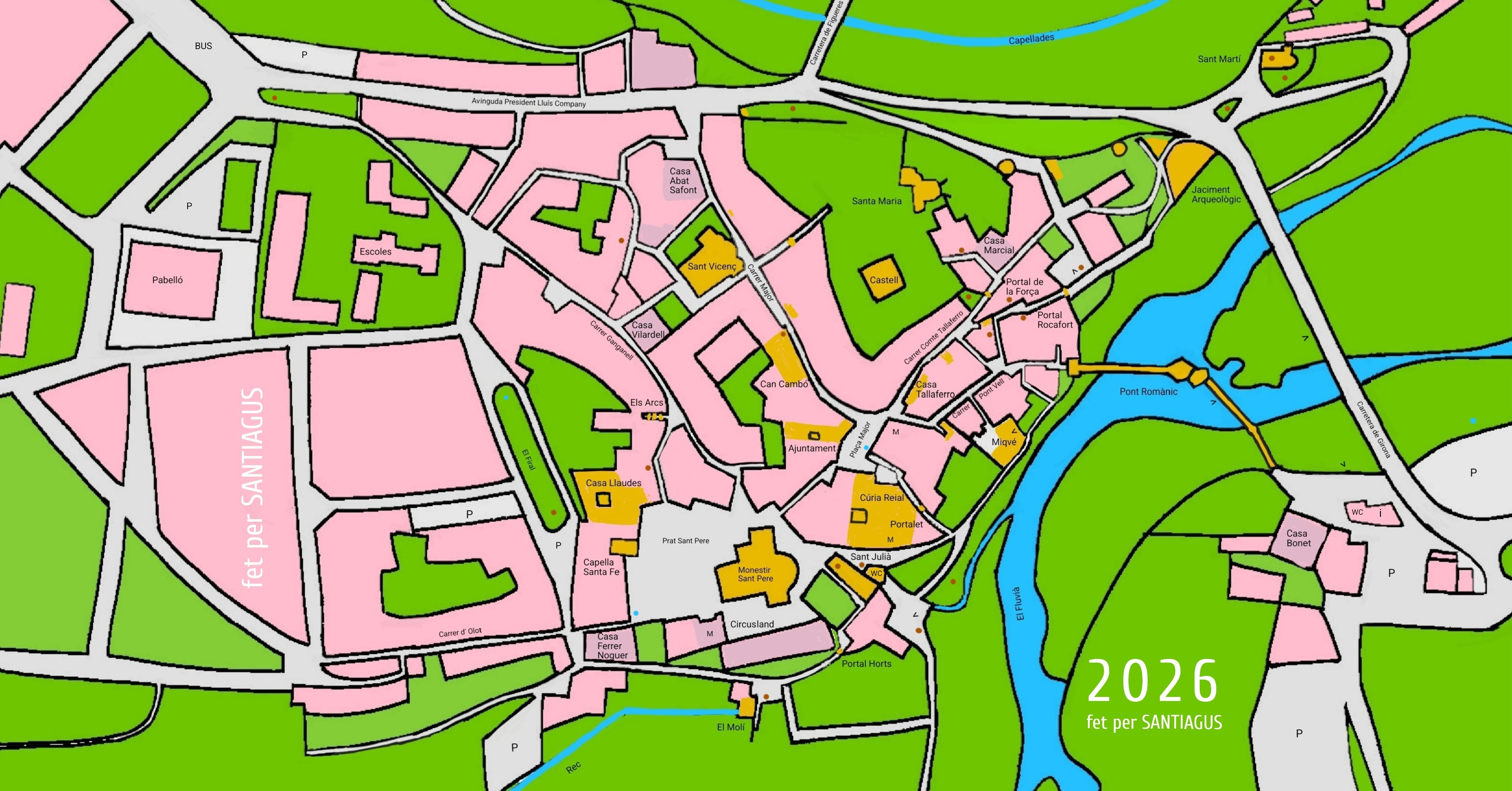
Map of Besalú

== Economy ==
By the mid-20th century, agriculture ceased to be the primary economic activity due to urban growth and industrialization within the region. The predominant crops shifted to barley, corn, and hay.

Today, the main sources of income are industry and tourism. Many industrial sectors, established predominantly after 1960, include textiles, metalworking, and gypsum quarrying. Tourism, along with the tertiary sector, has become a significant revenue driver, bolstered by the area’s historical monuments and annual cultural celebrations of interest.

== See also ==
- County of Besalú
- Viscounty of Besalú
