= Maud of Apulia =

Daughter of Robert Guiscard; Italian noble (c. 1060–c. 1112)

Maud of Apulia (c. 1060 – c. 1112) was a member of the Norman D’Hauteville family and a daughter of Robert Guiscard and his second wife Sikelgaita, a Lombard princess, the daughter of Guaimar IV, Prince of Salerno. She was also known as Mahalda, Mahault, Mafalda and Matilda. She was the wife of Ramón Berenguer II, and thus Countess of Barcelona (1077–1082). After her husband’s death, she remarried Aimery I, the Viscount of Narbonne (1086–1108).

== Lineage ==
Maud was the first daughter of Robert Guiscard, Duke of Apulia and Calabria, (ca.1020 - 1085) with his second wife Sikelgaita. Her brother was Roger Borsa, the effective ruler of southern Italy from 1085 until his death. Her first cousins were Simon of Sicily and Roger II (sons of Roger) who led the effort to consolidate southern Italy and Sicily under Norman (D’Hauteville) rule, which was accomplished in 1130. She was also a half sister of Bohemund of Taranto, who was one of the leaders of the First Crusade and became Prince of Antioch.

== Countess of Barcelona ==
The wedding of Ramon Berenguer II with Maud took place at the beginning of 1077. The marriage could have been the result of the policy of Pope Gregory VII, who sought support among the Norman nobility of southern Italy against Henry IV, Holy Roman Emperor. In that same year, Counts William IV of Toulouse and Ramón de Roerga, stepbrothers of Ramón Berenguer, had also married daughters of Norman noblemen.

On December 5, 1082, Ramón Berenguer II was assassinated by a group of men believed to have conspired with his twin brother, Berenguer Ramón II, with whom he shared the rule of the county of Barcelona. A few days before, Maud had given birth to a son, the future Ramón Berenguer III. The death of her husband left Maud and her son in a precarious situation, since the infant could not inherit the county until after the death of his uncle. However, he did succeed to that role in 1097, when his Uncle was exiled.

== Viscountess of Narbonne ==
Around 1086, Maud married Aimery I, Viscount of Narbonne, with whom she had four children: the future Aimery II of Narbonne, Guiscardo, Bernardo and Berenguer.

She was widowed again in 1105, after which she returned to Barcelona, her first son, Ramón Berenguer III, being already installed as the Count of Barcelona.

She died in the Monastery of Sant Daniel, Girona and was buried in the Girona Cathedral next to her first husband.

== See also ==
- Tancred of Hauteville
- County of Apulia and Calabria
- Norman conquest of southern Italy
- First Crusade

== Sources ==
- Sobrequés, Santiago, Els Grans Comtes de Barcelona, Barcelona, 1961.
- Norwich, John Julius, The Normans in the South 1016-1130. Longman: London, 1967.
- Norwich, John Julius, The Kingdom in the Sun 1130-1194. Longman: London, 1970.
- Matthew, Donald. The Norman Kingdom of Sicily. Cambridge University Press: London, 1992.
- Langlois, Gauthier (2018). "Nouvelles perspectives sur les relations entre Barcelone et Carcassonne à la fin du XIe siècle d'après un compte catalan". Annales du Midi. 130 (304): 519–533.
