= Almodis of La Marche =

French noblewoman

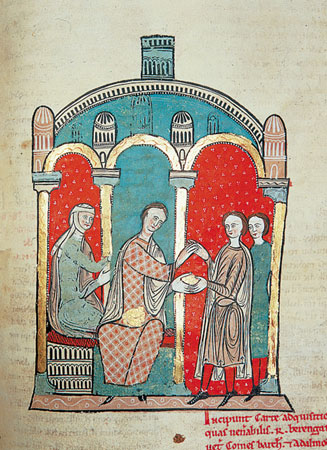
- Ramon Berenguer I and his wife, Almodis de la Marche, counting out 2,000 ounces of gold coins as payment to William Raymond and Adelaide, count and countess of Cerdagne, in return for their rights over Carcassonne in 1067.
- Born: c. 1020
- Died: 1071 (aged 50–51)
- Noble family: House of Marche
- Spouses: Hugh V of Lusignan; Pons of Toulouse; Ramon Berenguer I, Count of Barcelona
- Issue: With Hugh; Hugh VI of Lusignan; Jordan de Lusignan; Méllisende; With Pons; William IV of Toulouse; Raymond IV of Toulouse; Hugh; Almodis; With Ramon; Berenguer Ramon II; Ramon Berenguer II, Count of Barcelona; Agnes; Sancha
- Father: Bernard I, Count of Marche
- Mother: Amélie

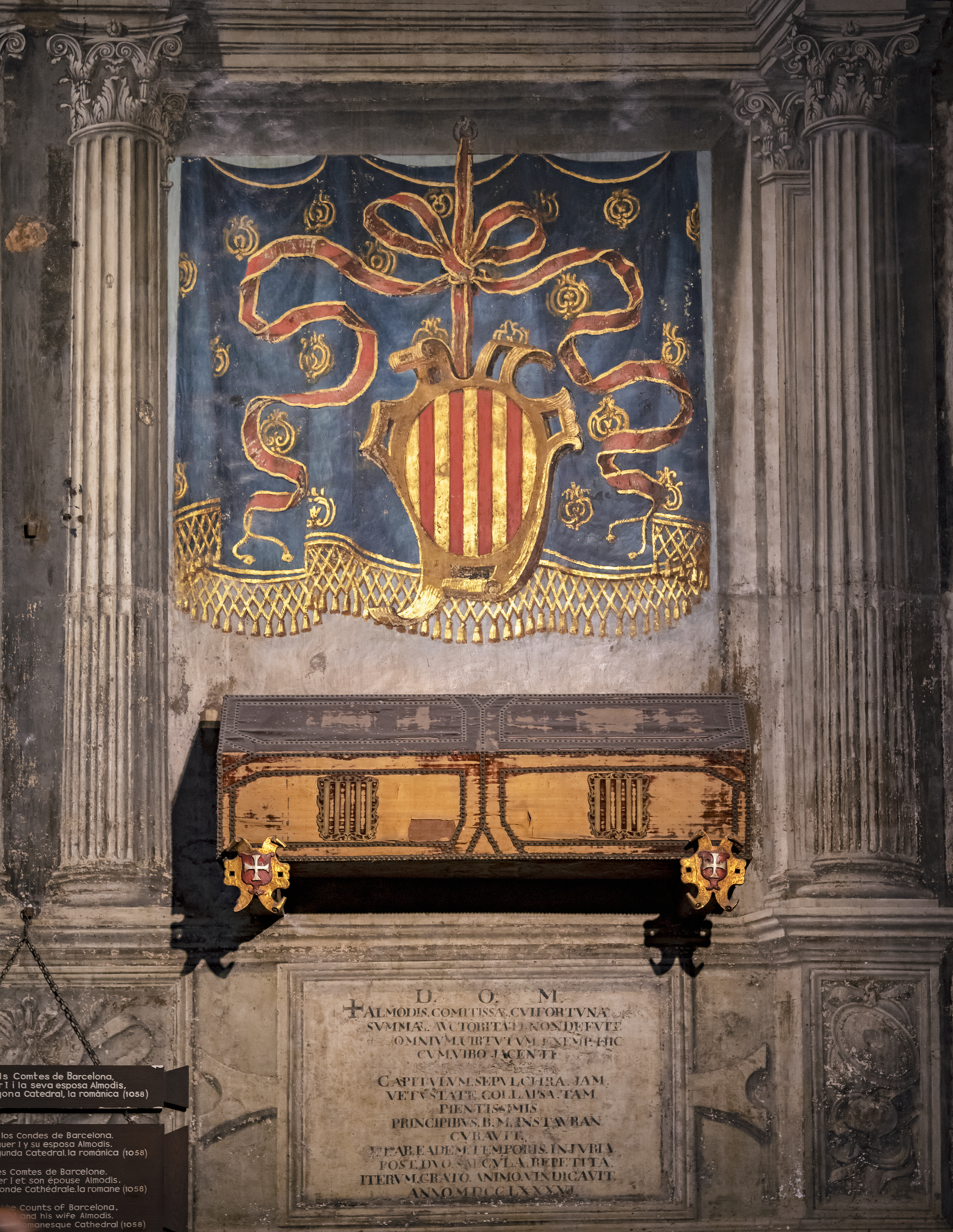
Tomb of Almodis de la Marche.

Almodis de la Marche (c. 1020 – 16 October 1071) was a French noble famed for her marriages. She and her third husband, Ramon Berenguer I, Count of Barcelona, with whom she committed double bigamy in 1053, were excommunicated by the Pope. Almodis played an active political role during her marriage to Ramon Berenguer I, acting as his co-ruler in legal and diplomatic affairs.

== Life ==
Almodis was the daughter of Count Bernard I of Marche and Amélie. She married Hugh V of Lusignan around 1038 and they had two sons and one daughter. Almodis and Hugh of Lusignan divorced due to consanguinity. She later, with Hugh's assistance, married Count Pons of Toulouse in 1040. Almodis was still Pons' wife in April 1053, when she was abducted by Count Ramon Berenguer I of Barcelona. He kidnapped her from Narbonne with the aid of a fleet sent north by his ally, the Muslim emir of Tortosa. They married immediately (despite the fact both of her previous husbands were still alive) and they appear with their twin sons in a charter the next year. Pope Victor II excommunicated Almodis and Ramon for this illegal marriage until 1056. During her time as countess, she led or participated in diplomatic missions, such as negotiations with Muslim taifas like that of Dénia, and helped strengthen alliances beyond the Pyrenees. She also presided over judicial sessions during her husband's military absences, acting as a regent.

Almodis maintained contact with her former husbands and many children, and in 1066/1067 she traveled to Toulouse for her daughter's wedding. A few years before, in 1060, Hugh V of Lusignan had revolted against his lord, Duke William VIII of Aquitaine, in support of Almodis' son William IV of Toulouse. Her sons supported one another in military campaigns; Hugh VI of Lusignan, Raymond IV of Toulouse, and Berenguer Ramon II of Barcelona all took the Cross.

Her third husband Ramon was married to her niece, Isabela Trencavel, the daughter of Rangearde de la Marche. Their son, Peter Raymundi, was Ramon's original heir. Peter Raymundi resented Almodis' influence and was concerned she was trying to replace him with her own two sons, his consanguineous nephews, both who had claims through their father, Count La Marche. He murdered her in October 1071. William of Malmesbury reflected that she was, "sad, [of] unbridled lewdness".

Almodis co-authored the Usages of Barcelona (c. 1068), the first comprehensive legal code for the County of Barcelona, where she is explicitly named as "consors et auctrix".

== Family ==
Almodis married Hugh V of Lusignan around 1038. They had :

- Hugh VI of Lusignan (c. 1039–1101)
- Jordan de Lusignan
- Mélisende de Lusignan (b. bef. 1055), married before 1074 to Simon I "l'Archevêque", Vidame de Parthenay

Almodis and Hugh of Lusignan divorced due to consanguinity, and Hugh arranged for her to marry Count Pons of Toulouse in 1040. They had:

- William IV of Toulouse
- Raymond IV of Toulouse
- Hugh, Abbot of Saint-Gilles
- Almodis of Toulouse, married Count Pierre of Melgueil

In 1053, Almodis married Ramon Berenguer I, Count of Barcelona. They had:

- Berenguer Ramon II, Count of Barcelona
- Ramon Berenguer II, Count of Barcelona
- Agnes of Barcelona, married Count Guigues II of Albon
- Sancha of Barcelona, married Count Guillermo Ramon I of Cerdagne

Her daughter Agnes from her third marriage married Guigues II of Albon, thereby reinforcing ties between the Catalan counts and the lords of the Dauphiné.

== Sources ==
- Aurell, Martin (1995). Les noces du comte: mariage et pouvoir en Catalogne (785-1213) (in French). Publications de la Sorbonne. ISBN 2-85944-251-0.
- Bishko, Charles Julian (1968). "Fernando I and the Origins of the Leonese-Castilian Alliance with Cluny". Studies in Medieval Spanish Frontier History. Variorum.
- Cheyette, Fredric L. (1988). "The "Sale" of Carcassonne to the Counts of Barcelona (1067-1070) and the Rise of the Trencavels". Speculum. 63 (4 Oct). The University of Chicago Press: 826–864. doi:10.2307/2853537. JSTOR 2853537. S2CID 161546283.
- Kagay, Donald J. (1993). "Countess Almodis of Barcelona: "Illustrious and Distinguished Queen" or "Woman of Sad, Unbridled Lewdness"". In Vann, Theresa M. (ed.). Queens, Regents and Potentates. Academia Press.
- Peña (1991). The Chronicle of San Juan de la Peña: A Fourteenth-century Official History of the Crown of Aragon. Translated by Nelson, Lynn H. University of Pennsylvania Press.
- Riley-Smith, Jonathan (1997). The First Crusaders, 1095-1131. Cambridge University Press.
- Ruiz-Domènec, José Enrique (2006). Quan els vescomtes de Barcelona eren Història (in Spanish). Fundacio Noguera. ISBN 84-9779-475-3.
- Stuard, Susan (1987). "The Dominion of Gender: Women's Fortunes in the High Middle Ages". In Bridenthal, Renate; Koonz, Claudia; Stuard, Susan (eds.). Becoming Visible: Women in European History. Houghton Mifflin Company. pp. 153–174. ISBN 0-395-41950-6.
