= Aimery of Narbonne =

Aimery of Narbonne, also spelled Aymeri or Aimeric, may refer to:

- Aymeri de Narbonne, figure of legend
- Aimery (archbishop of Narbonne), archbishop of Narbonne between 926 and 977
- Aimery I of Narbonne (r. 1077–1105)
- Aimery II of Narbonne (r. 1105–34)
- Aimery III of Narbonne (r. 1202–39)
- Aimery IV of Narbonne (r. 1270–98)
- Aimery V of Narbonne (r. 1328–36)
- Aimery VI of Narbonne (r. 1341–88)
