= Principality of Tarragona =

Norman Principality in Spain during the Reconquista

Principality of Tarragona Principatus Tarraconensis (Latin) Principado de Tarragona (Spanish) Principat de Tarragona (Catalan)
- 1129–1173
- Flag Coat of arms of Robert d'Aguilo

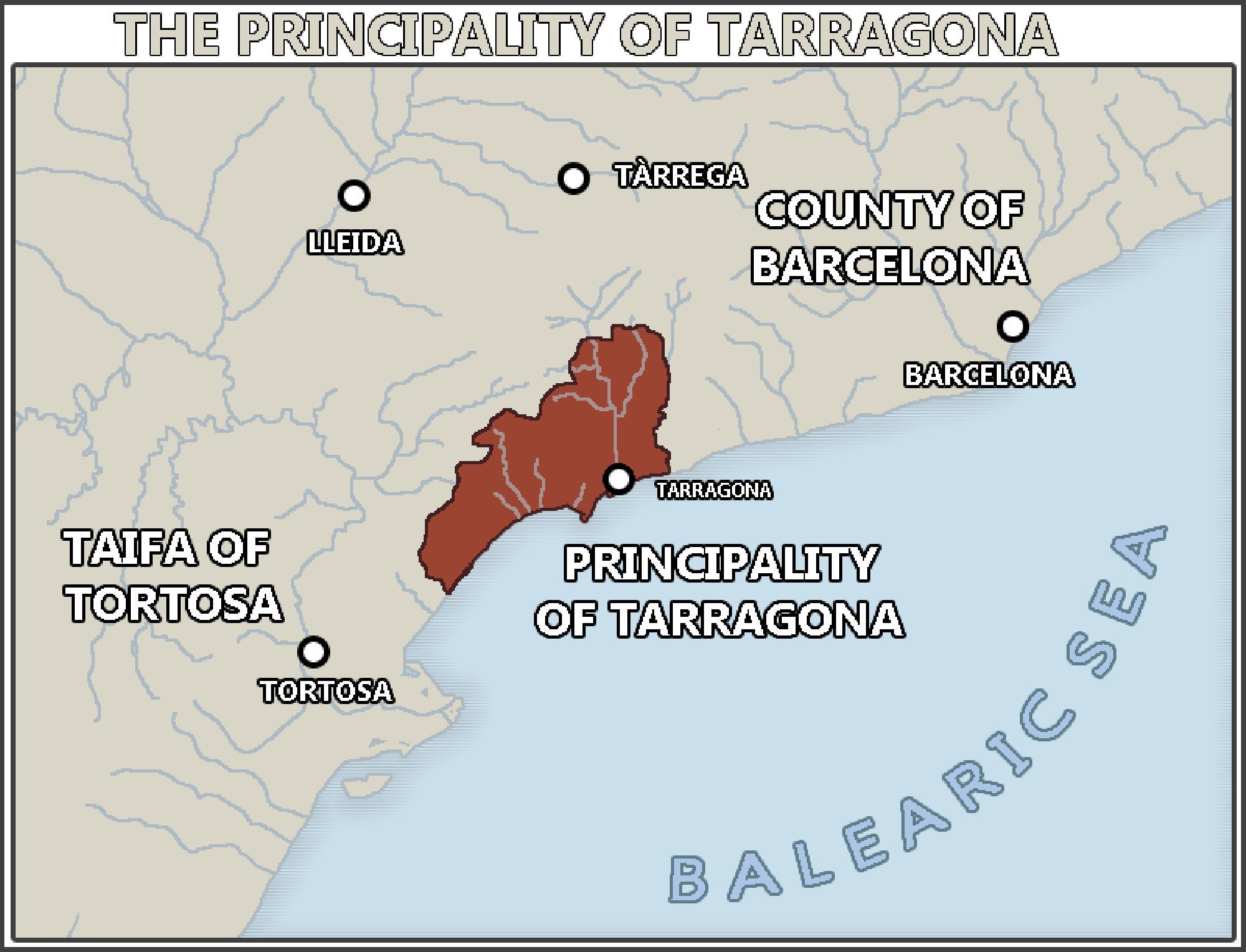
- The Principality of Tarragona's borders by the end of the Principality in 1173 AD
- Status: Vassal of the Papal States (1129–1137, 1143–1173); De facto independent state (1137–1143); Vassal of the County of Barcelona (1153–1162); Vassal of the Crown of Aragon (1162–1173)
- Capital: Tarragona
- Common languages: Medieval Latin, Old Norman, Old Catalan
- Religion: Roman Catholicism (de jure)
- Government: Feudal Monarchy under a (de jure) Ecclesiastical Principality
- Prince of Tarragona
  - 1129–1155: Robert d'Aguilo I
  - 1151–1155: Ramon Berenguer IV
  - 1155–1168: Guillem d'Aguilo
  - 1168–1172: Robert d'Aguilo II
- Historical era: High Middle Ages
  - Established: March 14, 1129
  - Vassalage to the County of Barcelona: 1153
  - Incorporation into the Crown of Aragon: 1173
Preceded by	Succeeded by
Almoravid Dynasty; Taifa of Zaragoza	Crown of Aragon
- Today part of: Spain

The Principality of Tarragona was a state in and around the city of Tarragona on the northeastern side of the Iberian peninsula. It existed from its founding by the Norman adventurer Robert d'Aguilo I (also known as Robert Bordet or Robert de Culley) in 1129 until its ultimate absorption into the Crown of Aragon in the 1170s following two decades of civil war. The state was founded after the permanent conquest of Tarragona by Christian forces during the Reconquista in 1128.

== Early history ==
=== Christian conquest ===
Tarragona became a significant target of the Reconquista, particularly for the Catholic Church, in the late 11th and early 12th centuries. Although earlier reconquest efforts had been undertaken by the house of Barcelona, with one military mission even successfully occupying the city temporarily, by 1108 all attempts to recover the city permanently had failed. Despite these military failures, Count Ramon Berenguer II of Barcelona had, in 1088, enfeoffed the city and surrounding area to the papacy.The papacy then entrusted the area to Archbishop Berenguer, although Tarragona itself would not actually be recovered until 1116, when the area was conquered by Count Ramon Berenguer III of Barcelona. Following this conquest, the new Archbishop of Tarragona, Oleguer Bonestruga, would seek help defending and reconstructing the depopulated and decaying city by contracting Robert d'Aguilo, a soldier of fortune who hailed from Normandy and who had previously served as military governor of Tudela, to assume the secular lordship of Tarragona.

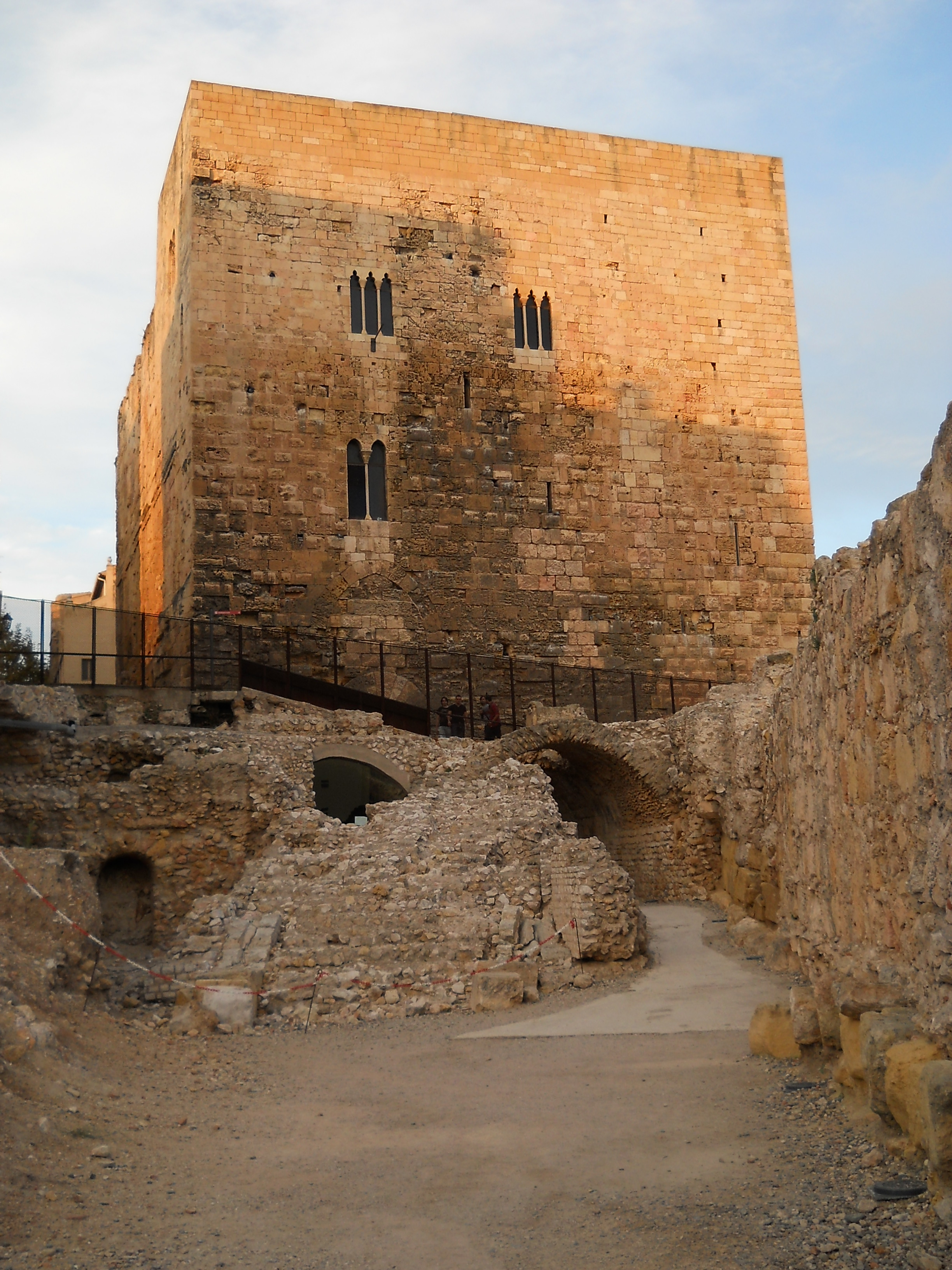
The Praetorian Tower in Tarragona, used by Robert d'Aguilo as his Royal Palace

=== Establishment of the Principality ===
On 14 March 1129 Robert d'Aguilo pays homage to Archbishop Oleguer Bonestruga and receives the city of Tarragona and its territory as a fief. Robert is made princeps Tarraconnensis, or Prince of Tarragona, although in actuality his role was closer to that of vidame of the Archbishop. Robert was henceforth a vassal of the Church, and not of the Count of Barcelona, who had earlier given up the land to the Church. In 1130 Prince Robert visited Rome to pay homage to Pope Honorius II and secure papal backing for the lasting occupation of Tarragona. During his absence, Robert's wife Sibyl ruled the Principality, even patrolling the walls in full knight's attire, with staff in hand, to keep the sentries alert. In 1133, at the Battle of Fraga, Prince Robert and his Norman army arrived just in time to relieve King Alfonso I of Aragon, and thereafter Robert's reputation spread, even as far as Italy. Over time, the Archbishop's involvement in Tarragona waned, and he never resided there, instead opting to continue governing from Barcelona. He died on 6 March 1137 in Barcelona.

== Disputes with the Church ==
In 1143, following six years of de facto independence due to the vacancy created by the death of Archbishop Bonestruga, Abbot Gregory of Cuixa was elected as Oleguer's successor, however he died only one year later, in 1144 before ever setting foot in Tarragona. Bernard Tort, a loyal partisan and collaborator of Count Ramon Berenguer IV of Barcelona, was then elected as the new archbishop in May 1146, a position he would hold until 1163. The new archbishop sought to re impose the Church's seigneurial rights over Tarragona following the Principality's de facto independence after the death of Archbishop Bonestruga in 1137. This would lead to a number of disputes with the ruling d'Aguilo family that would ultimately result in the downfall of the Principality. In 1146, the Knights Templars established a comarca at the fortress of Ciurana, despite the fact that the area was nominally under the sovereignty of the Principality. This event would begin the long decline of secular authority in the Principality, and signaled the start of increasing Church power in the region.

On 4 January 1148 a charter was issued, which reorganized Tarragona's government. Formerly, the government had been run by two chief magistrates who were elected by the townsmen, under this new charter these magistrates would now be appointed by Prince Robert. The agreement also attempted to curb internal dissent by clearly delineating all feudal ties within the realm, through fealty to the magistrates, and thereby to Robert, and to his lord, the archbishop. Although Tarragona's independence from Barcelona was maintained, the charter did make key concessions, including an agreement to govern "according to the laws and customs of the court of Barcelona", thereby dispensing with any Norman legal traditions and customs that may have been practiced in the Principality up to this point. One year later, on 9 February 1149, the Archbishop modified this charter to specifically supplant the original 1129 agreement, by removing the section of the original 1129 agreement which conceded "the city with its territory" to Robert d'Aguilo I "in perpetuity" and instead dividing Tarragona's rights and revenues into five parts, including granting one section of the city, where the Archbishop himself resided, immunity from secular judges. Meanwhile, outside the Principality, the conquests of Tortosa and Lérida has been completed in 1148 and 1149 respectively, thereby cutting off Tarragona from further expansion and surrounding it with vassals of the Count of Barcelona.

=== Court case ===
In 1151, tensions between the Archbishop and the d'Aguilo family boiled over, and a court was convened to consider charges brought by the Archbishop and the Prince against each other. The Archbishop charged the d'Aguilos and their fellow Norman settlers with several serious offenses, only one of which was needed to justify denunciation of his vassal; the d'Aguilos were blamed for burning mills operated by the Church on three occasions, destroying a canal, a sown field on ecclesiastical land, violating the immunity of the town of Constanti, alienating two honores from church possessions at San Vicente and Centcelles, and commending other property without archiepiscopal consent in violation of the 1148 revised charter. The accusations were not directed against Prince Robert himself, now nearly 70 years old, but against his eldest son and heir, Guillem d'Aguilo.

Guillem's countercharges stated that the Archbishop had violated the covenant of 1129, had usurped two thirds of the city through the creation of the archiepisocal district in 1149, had seized lands outside of the village of Constanti that in fact belonged to the d'Aguilos, and, most seriously, of attempting to take sole control of Tarragona in order to convert it into an episcopal city, where the curia administered urban affairs. According to Guillem, the limitations imposed on the secular justices in the 1148 charter, as well as threatening to remove them from the city, was part of the Archbishop's plan to wrest control of the city away from the d'Aguilos. This last charge was categorically denied by the Archbishop, who claimed that the agreement of 1148 was just, since it was signed by Robert, his wife, and his heir, with their free consent. Additionally, Guillem argued that the unlimited multiplication of ecclesiastical dominicaturae in Tarragona was an illegitimate abuse of power designed to further the Archbishop's plan to remove the d'Aguilo family from power. A dominicatura was a territorial jurisdiction usually associated with castles and adjoining lands, and usually included much more land than was necessary to support the religious house that possessed it.

Archbishop Bernard Tort had, in the 1140s, created numerous special dominicaturae in order to ensure ample land for the future expansion of his Church throughout the Principality. Furthermore, the Archbishop had declared his dominion over the old temple section of the city's acropolis surrounding the future site of Tarragona's cathedral, Santa Tecla la Vieja. The purpose of Guillem's charges was to make the court recognize that this right, if used arbitrarily and without restriction, was an encroachment upon his family's estate, and constituted a violation of the covenant of 1129. With respect to the disputed lands outside the village of Constanti, Guillem asserted that he had purchased these lands from the Church of Vich, and therefore these lands, which were claimed by Archbishop Bernard as dominicatura, had never been part of the Church's dominicatura to begin with, and that only the village of Constanti itself was, in fact, Archiepiscopal land. However, the archdeacon of Tarragona claimed that Guillem's charges were untrue, and after several witnesses were heard, he demonstrated that the lands had for sometime been considered part of the Church's dominicatura at Constanti.

=== Verdict of the court ===
Due to Guillem's inability to provide proof of his case, either by written evidence of the sale or witnesses to counter those of the archdeacon, the contested property was awarded by the court to the church. This failure to prove his case against Archbishop Bernard cast doubt on many of his other charges, some of which may have been legitimate, in light of the archbishop's non denial of them. After this victory, Archbishop Bernard accused Guillem of violating fealty in having brought false charges against his lord, which was a serious offense, according to the Archbishop, because it endangered his reputation and his holy office. In a court dominated by churchmen and nobles sympathetic to the Count of Barcelona, the charges against the Archbishop were dismissed, and the court declared that, if Archbishop Bernard could verify his testimony regarding Guillem's destruction of church property, these allegations were serious enough to constitute a violation of his vassalage to the archbishop, making the contract of 1129 no longer binding. It did not condemn Prince Robert, but allowed the Archbishop the option of denying Guillem d'Aguilo his right to inherit the Principality of Tarragona.

== Fall of the Principality ==
Shortly after the conclusion of the court case, in 1151, Count Ramon Berenguer IV, with Papal consent, assumed the title of Prince of Tarragona, though he did not dispute Prince Robert d'Aguilo I's claim to the title, and effectively ruled as Co-Prince until the succession of Guillem d'Aguilo, at which point Ramon Berenguer IV ceased his use of the title, making Guillem sole Prince of Tarragona.In June 1153, following more litigation, Guillem and his mother, in the name of Robert d'Aguilo I, who still claimed his title of Prince, renewed their vassalage to the archbishop and, for the first time, also swore fealty to Ramon Berenguer IV, Count of Barcelona. Following this, a tripartite division of Tarragona was confirmed, in which the Normans held only one third. Prince Robert died sometime in the late 1150s, and what followed was constant feuding and the outbreak of civil war, which would last until the 1170s. On 13 February 1163, Archbishop Bernard Tort called Prince Guillem to the court of Barcelona, to renew his oath of fealty to the Count and to the Archbishop. On 28 June 1163 Archbishop Bernard died in England, and was succeeded by Archbishop Hugh de Cervello.

Having earlier failed to win back in court what Prince Guillem felt was rightfully his, Guillem now resorted to arms, forcibly occupying sections of Tarragona held by the Archbishop and illegally collecting rents and extracting tributes, including in the village of Constanti, which had been the subject of a legal dispute between Guillem and the Archbishop a decade earlier. Considerable damage to the city was caused by this outbreak in fighting, and Tarragona was henceforth divided by two armed groups. In addition, the forts which ringed the city, meant to defend it from outside invasion, had now become a battleground in this civil war, with forts in various locations around the city taking sides in the dispute.

=== Intervention by King Alfonso II ===
In an attempt to end the violence, the young King Alfonso II of Aragon and his court summoned Prince Guillem to court in Tortosa in 1168, where King Alfonso II censured the Prince for his violent and illegal actions, and threatened the Prince with expatriation and the seizure of all his lands. Guillem defended himself and, although the details of his defense are unknown, it does appear that his defense was enough to convince the King and the court that some leniency was appropriate. Prince Guillem was ordered to cease his illegal actions, including his illegal collecting of rents, his attacks against the Church, and furthermore, Guillem was forbidden from making war without the express permission of the King, and was ordered to pay for the damage to the city of Tarragona. Guillem was then ordered to take a renewed oath of fealty to the Archbishop and the King.

Shortly after the court adjourned, and after his reconciliation with the King, Guillem d'Aguilo was found dead in Tortosa, likely killed by agents of Archbishop Cervello. Archbishop Cervello, who had ties to the Count of Barcelona, was deeply hostile to the d'Aguilo family, and served as their primary adversary for much of the civil war. Following the death of Guillem, his younger brother, Robert d'Aguilo II, claimed the title of Prince of Tarragona, with the support of his younger brother Berenguer.

In early 1169, a Muslim rebellion broke out in Tarragona and the surrounding countryside, and was supported by the Muslim Taifa of Valencia and Murcia, who encouraged such uprisings in order to relieve pressure on his own position. The civil war in the Principality continued until April 1171, when Archbishop Cervello was assassinated by agents of Berenguer d'Aguilo. This assassination resulted in another intervention by King Alfonso II of Aragon, who would restore order to the city and put down the Muslim revolt.

Meanwhile, in June 1171, a series of papal bulls were issued by Pope Alexander III in response to the Archbishop's murder, excommunicating the d'Aguilo family from the Church and demanding their expulsion from Tarragona. On 25 January 1172, Pope Alexander III congratulated King Alfonso II of Aragon on his proscription of the d'Aguilos, and proclaimed their disinheritance. However, it would not be until mid 1172 that, after putting down the Muslim revolt, King Alfonso II would finally expel the d'Aguilo brothers, Robert II and Berenguer, from Tarragona. The d'Aguilos would flee to Tamarit before finally fleeing to Mallorca. By 1173 royal supremacy had been asserted over Tarragona by King Alfonso II, and the Principality of Tarragona was no more.

== Currency ==
The Principality minted its own currency, the libra, which bears the head of an Eagle on the obverse, representing the d'Aguilo family, and on the reverse the Tau or Greek cross of Santa Tecla, patron saint of the city. These symbols represented the mixed secular and ecclesiastical rule of the city. Early versions of these coins were minted without any inscription, but later coins, minted beginning in the 1140s, feature an inscription on the obverse, around the head of the Eagle, that reads "DE TA RA GO NA"
