= Peter Raymundi =

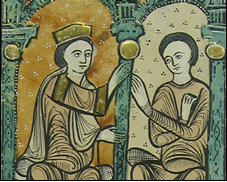

Peter Raymundi, or Pere-Ramon (c. 1050-?) was the heir of Ramon Berenguer I, Count of Barcelona and his first wife, Isabela Trencavel, daughter of Count Sancho of Gascony, known for the murder of his stepmother, Almodis de la Marche in October 1071. Raymundi was apparently concerned about Almodis' influence and worried she was trying to replace him, but was disinherited and exiled for his crime.

== Penance ==
In 1073 the Roman cardinals, at the behest of Gregory VII, sentenced Raymundi to an abnormal penance that both fit the political situation, and demonstrated Gregory's stance on harsh penance. Raymundi's 24 year penance consisted of an inability to bear arms, rather than a more usual demand to join a monastery, or go on a pilgrimage. One facet was that he "should on no account carry military arms, except in two contingencies: to defend himself against enemies, and to ride to battle against the Saracens". Raymundi had no one to fight but the Muslims, and in the interest of maintaining his 'booty economy' wealth and influence, became part of the Reconquista.

== Sources ==
- Cowdrey, H. E. J. (1998). Pope Gregory VII, 1073-1085. Oxford: Clarendon Press. p. 512. ISBN 0191584592.
- Cowdrey, Herbert Edward John (1999). The Crusades and Latin Monasticism, 11th-12th Centuries. Ashgate.
- Jotischky, Andrew (2014). Crusading and the Crusader States. Routledge. ISBN 978-1317876021.
- Jotischky, Andrew (2015). The Crusades: A Beginner's Guide. Oneworld Publications. ISBN 978-1780745022.
- Mastnak, Tomaz (2002). Crusading Peace: Christendom, the Muslim World, and Western Political Order. University of California Press. ISBN 0520226356.
