= Ramon Berenguer II of Barcelona =

Count of Barcelona from 1076 to 1082

Ramon Berenguer II

Count of Barcelona
- Reign: 1076–1082
- Predecessor: Ramon Berenguer I
- Successor: Berenguer Ramon II
- Born: c. 1053
- Died: 6 December 1082 (aged c. 29); Sant Feliu de Buixalleu
- Noble family: Barcelona
- Spouse: Mahalta of Apulia
- Issue: Ramon Berenguer III
- Father: Ramon Berenguer I
- Mother: Almodis de La Marche

Ramon Berenguer II the Towhead or Cap de estopes (1053 or 1054 – December 5, 1082) was Count of Barcelona from 1076 until his death. He was the son of Ramon Berenguer I, Count of Barcelona, and Almodis de La Marche. The Chronicle of San Juan de la Pena called him, "… exceeding brave and bold, kind, pleasant, pious, joyful, generous, and of an attractive appearance". Because of the extremely thick hair he had on top of his head, he was known as Cap d'Estop."

He succeeded his father as co-ruler with his twin brother, Berenguer Ramon II in 1075. The twins failed to agree and divided their possessions between them, against the will of their late father. Ramon Berenguer the Towhead, so called because of the thickness and colour of his hair, was killed while hunting in the woods in 1082. His brother, who went on to become the sole ruler of Catalonia, was credited by popular opinion of having orchestrated this murder. Berenguer Ramon II the Fratricide was later succeeded by Ramon Berenguer's son, Ramon Berenguer III.

== Family and issue ==
Ramon Berenguer married Mahalta (or Maud) of Apulia, born ca. 1059, died 1111/1112, daughter of Duke Robert Guiscard and of Sikelgaita de Salerno. Following his murder, she remarried to Aimery I of Narbonne, and was the mother of his son Aimery II.

Ramon Berenguer and Mahalta's son, Ramon Berenguer III (before 1082–1131), was count of Barcelona and Provence.

== Sources ==
- Bamford, Heather (2018). Cultures of the Fragment: Uses of the Iberian Manuscript, 1100–1600. University of Toronto Press.
- Benito, Pere (2017). "An Intense but Stymied Occitan Campaign". In Sabaté, Flocel (ed.). The Crown of Aragon: A Singular Mediterranean Empire. Brill. pp. 92–124.
- Bensch, Stephen P. (1995). Barcelona and Its Rulers, 1096–1291. Cambridge University Press.
- Graham-Leigh, Elaine (2005). The Southern French Nobility and the Albigensian Crusade. The Boydell Press.
- Heygate, Catherine (2013). "Marriage Strategies among the Normans of Southern Italy in the Eleventh Century". In Stringer, Keith J.; Jotischky, Andrew (eds.). Norman Expansion: Connections, Continuities and Contrasts. Routledge. pp. 165–186.
- Peña (1991). The Chronicle of San Juan de la Peña: A Fourteenth-century Official History of the Crown of Aragon. Translated by Nelson, Lynn H. University of Pennsylvania Press.

Preceded by Ramon Berenguer I	Count of Barcelona with Berenguer Ramon II; 1076–1082	Succeeded by Berenguer Ramon II
