= Ramon Berenguer I of Barcelona =

Count of Barcelona (1023–1076)

Ramon Berenguer I the Old
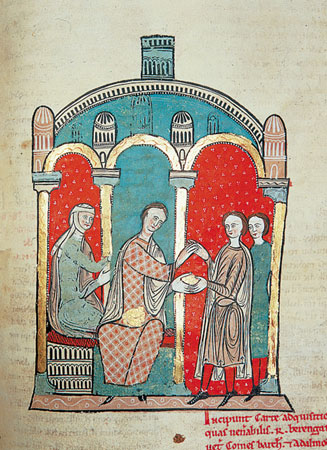
- Ramon Berenguer I and his wife, Almodis de la Marche, counting out 2000 ounces of gold coins as payment to William Raymond and Adelaide, count and countess of Cerdagne, in return for their rights over Carcassonne in 1067.

Count of Barcelona
- Reign: 1035–1076
- Predecessor: Berenguer Ramon I
- Successor: Ramon Berenguer II and Berenguer Ramon II
- Born: c. 1023
- Died: 26 May 1076 (aged 52-53)
- Buried: Barcelona Cathedral
- Noble family: Barcelona
- Spouses: Elisabeth of Narbonne; Blanca of Narbonne; Almodis de la Marche
- Issue: Peter Raymundi; Ramon Berenguer II, Count of Barcelona; Berenguer Ramon II, Count of Barcelona; Agnes; Sancha
- Father: Berenguer Ramon I the Crooked
- Mother: Sancha Sanchez

Ramon Berenguer I (c. 1023 – 26 May 1076), called the Old (Catalan: el Vell, French: le Vieux), was Count of Barcelona in 1035–1076. He promulgated the earliest versions of a written code of Catalan law, the Usages of Barcelona.

Born in about 1023, he succeeded his father, Berenguer Ramon I the Crooked in 1035. It was during his reign that the dominant position of Barcelona among the other Catalan counties became evident.

Ramon Berenguer campaigned against the Moors, extending his dominions as far west as Barbastro and imposing heavy tributes (parias) on other Moorish cities. Historians claim that those tributes helped create the first wave of prosperity in Catalan history. During his reign Catalan maritime power started to be felt in the western Mediterranean. Ramon Berenguer the Old was also the first count of Catalonia to acquire lands (the counties of Carcassonne and Razés) and influence north of the Pyrenees.

Another major achievement of his was beginning the codification of Catalan law in the written Usatges of Barcelona which was to become the first full compilation of feudal law in Western Europe. Legal codification was part of the count's efforts to forward and somehow control the process of feudalization which started during the reign of his weak father, Berenguer Ramon. Another major contributor was the Church acting through the institution of the Peace and Truce of God. This established a general truce among warring factions and lords in a given region for a given time. The earliest extant date for introducing the Truce of God in Western Europe is 1027 in Catalonia, during the reign of his father, Berenguer Ramon.

While still married to his second wife Blanca, he became involved with the wife of the Count of Toulouse, Almodis de La Marche, countess of Limoges. Both quickly married and were consequently excommunicated by Pope Victor II.

Ramon Berenguer I, together with his third wife Almodis, also founded the Romanesque cathedral of Barcelona, to replace the older basilica presumably destroyed by Almanzor. Their velvet and brass bound wooden coffins are still displayed in the Gothic cathedral which eventually replaced the cathedral that they founded.

He was succeeded by his twin sons Ramon Berenguer II and Berenguer Ramon II.

== Family and issue ==
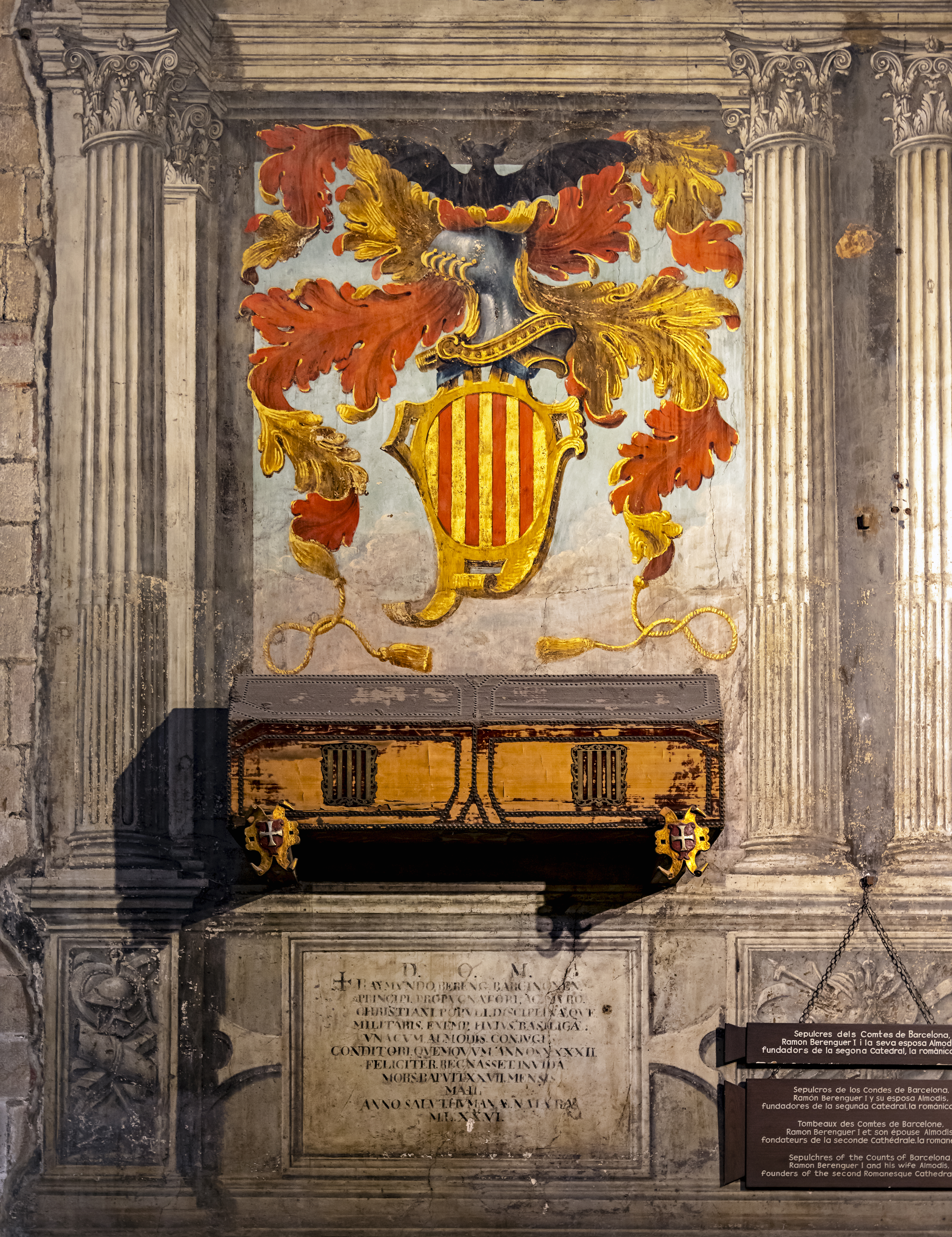
Sepulchers of Ramon Berenguer in the Cathedral of Barcelona.

- First wife, possibly Isabel, daughter of Count Sancho of Gascony
  - Berenguer (died young)
  - Arnau (died young)
  - Peter Raymundi (1050–1073?), murdered his father's third wife, Almodis, and was exiled
- Second wife, Blanca of Narbonne, daughter of Llop Ato Zuberoa and Ermengarda of Narbonne
- Third wife, Almodis de La Marche, countess of Limoges
  - Ramon Berenguer II, Count of Barcelona the Towhead (1053/54–1082)
  - Berenguer Ramon II, Count of Barcelona the Fratricide (1053/54–1097)
  - Agnes, married Guigues II of Albon
  - Sancha, married William Raymond, count of Cerdanya

== Sources ==
- Bishko, Charles Julian (1980). Studies in Medieval Spanish Frontier History. Variorum Reprints.
- Cowdrey, Herbert Edward John (1999). The Crusades and Latin Monasticism, 11th-12th Centuries. Ashgate.
- Humphrey, Patricia (1993). "Ermessenda of Barcelona: The Status of her Authority". In Vann, Theresa M. (ed.). Queens, Regents and Potentates. Academia Press.
- Reilly, Bernard F. (1995). The Contest of Christian and Muslim Spain, 1031-1157. Blackwell Publishing.

Preceded by Berenguer Ramon I	Count of Barcelona; 1035–1076	Succeeded by Ramon Berenguer II; Berenguer Ramon II
Preceded by Guisla of Lluçá; William I	Count of Osona; 1054–1076	Succeeded by Ramon Berenguer II; Berenguer Ramon II
Preceded by Garsenda; Ermengarde; Adelaide	Count of Carcassonne; 1069–1076	Succeeded by Ramon Berenguer II; Berenguer Ramon II
