= Sikelgaita =

11th-century Lombard princess

- Born: c. 1040
- Died: 16 April 1090
- Burial: Monte Cassino
- Spouse: Robert Guiscard
- Issue See more...: Maud; Roger Borsa; Guy; Robert Scalio; Sybil; Mabel; Unnamed daughter; Olympias; Cecilia; Gaitelgrima
- House: Salerno
- Father: Guaimar IV of Salerno
- Mother: Gemma of Capua

Sikelgaita (also Sichelgaita, Sigelgaita, or Gaita) (c. 1040 – 16 April 1090) was a Lombard princess, the daughter of Prince Guaimar IV of Salerno and second wife of Duke Robert Guiscard of Apulia. Her heritage made her a vital asset to Robert's governance in Southern Italy, legitimizing his reign and that of his successors. Sikelgaita frequently accompanied Robert on campaigns and is noted for leading troops in battle. She continued to be a significant source of support for her primary heir, Roger Borsa, and remained actively involved in politics until her death.

== Background and early life ==
Sikelgaita was born in 1040 (Note: Balfour suggests that she was in her late teens when she married Robert.) to Prince Guaimar IV of Salerno and his wife Gemma. Little is known of her earlier life or upbringing but she grew up with many siblings. According to historian David Balfour, there is no reason to suspect that she received any military or other extraordinary education. Her father had a successful career expanding the borders of the principality of Salerno over large territories in Southern Italy, including many important cities, still to peak when she was born. This was brought to an abrupt end when he and his brother were murdered by Sikelgaita's four maternal uncles when she was still young in 1052. Guaimar's Norman allies avenged him at the behest of his surviving brother Guy, declaring Sikelgaita's brother Gisulf II the new prince of Salerno. One of her sisters, Gaitelgrima, (Note: It has been suggested that this Gaitelgrima was illegitimate and probably much older.) had earlier married Robert's half-brother Drogo, and another Gaitelgrima later married Robert's nephew Jordan I of Capua.

=== Marriage to Robert ===
The Normans had been present in Southern Italy since before Sikelgaita was born. One of them on the rise was Robert Guiscard, who had inherited the county of Apulia and Calabria from Humphrey, his brother, in 1057. Robert's conquest reached the point where he needed to consolidate his land through a marriage alliance. Because his son, Bohemond, was an infant and much too young to marry Sikelgaita he decided to marry her himself. Gisulf was reluctant about the marriage. Norwich asserts that Gisulf had always hated the Normans and considered them barbarians but would accept on the condition that Robert pacified William, Robert's younger brother, and Richard I of Capua, both of whom he considered a threat to his principality. According to Valerie Eads, Gisulf instead relented because of a late payment of tribute that Gisulf owed Robert and could compensate with his consent to the marriage. Regardless, Sikelgaita married Robert in December 1058, after Robert divorced his first wife Alberada, due to supposed consanguinity. The divorce from Alberada and the marriage to Sikelgaita were probably part of a strategy of alliance with the remaining Lombard princes, of whom Gisulf was the prince. One year later after their marriage, Richard was raised to the title of Duke by Pope Nicholas II at the Synod of Melfi at the end of August.

== Duchess of Apulia ==
In the first few years of marriage, Sikelgaita appears inactive politically. Skinner explains that her primary objective in the first few years was to produce male heirs to secure Robert's claim on the Lombard lands. She started to appear in charters next to Robert in 1065 and because Robert was frequently in conflict with his neighbours and his vassals she would remain close to him throughout their marriage. Sikelgaita showed her ambition to ensure her son inherited Robert's lands early. When Robert once was close to death in 1073, she made their vassals swear allegiance to her eldest son Roger as heir over her older stepson Bohemond. Other than bearing children, Sikelgaita's purpose to Robert was to strengthen his claim to his land and ensure that her ancestry gave peace to the vassals who would otherwise rebel because of his status as a foreigner as well as grant her prestigious ancestry to their children.

=== Conflict with Gisulf of Salerno ===
Despite their alliance through Robert and Sikelgaita's marriage, Robert and Sikelgaita's brother Gisulf II of Salerno had a strenuous relationship. Robert continuously made encroaching acquisitions of land around his principality, most notably the city of Amalfi in 1073. Sikelgaita tried to mediate between her brother and husband, but Gisulf is said to have told her that he would make her a widow. Robert soon responded by laying siege to Salerno in the summer of 1076. Gisulf was unprepared to deal with a prolonged siege and the city surrendered in December 1076, while the last of Gisulf's forces held out in the inner citadel until May 1077. Robert and Sikelgaita made Salerno their new capital after the conquest. Because Sikelgaita was so important to Robert's legitimacy she was on occasion recognised as co-ruler in Salerno, and on two occasions she was titled duke and not duchess in charters in Salerno. Skinner argues that this is Robert acknowledging Sikelgaita's right to the principality is stronger than his own.

=== Military campaigns 1080–1085 ===
Southern Italy in 1084.

Sikelgaita frequently accompanied Robert on his campaigns but often as a prize or show of legitimacy for the Lombard following. Valerie Eads notes that after the siege of Salerno and years of childbearing ended, her military career took form in 1080.

Her first military objective was conducting the siege of Trani in 1080 while Robert moved against Taranto to defeat the rebels. The siege was successful and the rebel Peter II of Trani had to concede defeat. It is unknown to what extent she was in charge of the siege or why she was left there. Eads suggests that there were only so many he could trust who also had the loyalty of the Lombard troops. She argues that any kin with a claim to Robert's lands could easily betray him and that he needed his wife to be the guarantor of loyalty.

Sikelgaita also participated in the invasion of Dyrrhachium in 1081 against the Byzantine Empire. At first, it is said that she tried to persuade Robert not to attack the Byzantine Empire because she argued Christians should not fight other Christians. Sikelgaita likely participated due to similar reasons as before, a lack of loyal generals and steadfast ambition to protect the interest of her son and heir. Another possibility could be that the men she was sent to command were soldiers from Salerno and could be considered Sikelgaita's men due to her claim.

In 1083, Sikelgaita returned to Italy with Robert to defend Pope Gregory VII against the Holy Roman Emperor, Henry IV. By 1084 Robert and Sikelgaita once again turned their eyes towards the Byzantines in a second campaign during which Robert soon fell sick and died on Kefalonia 17 July 1085 with Sikelgaita at his side.

==== Role in battle ====
Whether or not Sikelgaita fought in battle is not known. The Byzantine historian Anna Comnena, the daughter of Emperor Alexios I with whom Robert and Sikelgaita battled in 1081 at Dyrrhachium, wrote in the Alexiad that Sikelgaita was on the field in full armour, rallying her and Robert's troops with a spear when the Byzantine army initially repulsed them and was in danger of losing cohesion. According to Skinner, Anna Comnena's description and tale of Sikelgaita is an attempt at discrediting and effeminating the Norman army by claiming they needed a Lombard woman to make them fight. Eads adds that Comnena's account is fanciful since Sikelgaita would not have been heard in battle among the chaos and that the only way for her to communicate with her troops would have been by waving a spear-like banner behind her troops. Comnena also said that Sikelgaita was "like another Pallas, if not a second Athena," in reference to her bravery. Eads notes that Comnena's description of Sikelgaita echos that of Roman writing on Boudica and it is not the only reference to other older literature as she attributes to her a quote from the Iliad.

John Julius Norwich argued that "in her we come face to face with the closest approximation in history to a Valkyrie. A woman of immense build and herculean physical strength, she hardly ever left her husband's side—least of all in battle, one of her favourite occupations. [...] At such moments, charging magnificently into the fray, her long blond hair streaming out from beneath her helmet, deafening friend and foe alike with huge shouts of encouragement or imprecation, she must have looked—even if she did not altogether sound—worthy to take her place among the daughters of Wotan." Balfour argues against this notion and says: "The image of Sichelgaita as a ‘Valkyrie’ or warrior princess is misleading, insofar as there is no evidence that she was ever an actual combatant."

William of Apulia, a contemporary poet employed by Roger Borsa, wrote a different account of Sikelgaita during the battle of Dyrrhachium in his poem The Deeds of Robert Guiscard. According to William, she is supposed to have fled with fear of her life during the battle trying to board an enemy ship after being wounded by a stray arrow, but god saved her from ridicule. Historian Paul Brown points out that William's patronage is only acknowledged in the end of the poem and that the patron might be disputable. Eads suggests that William's account might have been a choice encouraged by Sikelgaita herself to not overshadow her son and that it is unlikely that he lied about a battle wound that could easily have been verified at court by the actors in his poem. She also adds that this account explains why she would wear armour because "Combatant or not, she was in danger of death or capture like any of her troops."

== Widowhood ==
After Robert's death, Sikelgaita managed to name Roger Borsa as the heir to his titles although she remained an active actor. Skinner suggests that she was reluctant to give up power and step aside in favour of her son or step-son. Among several charters she signed with her son she put the Jews of Bari under that city's archbishop.

In his Historia Ecclesiastica, Orderic Vitalis states that she had studied and learned about the use of poisons among the doctors of the Schola Medica Salernitana. With this knowledge, she tried to poison Robert's son Bohemond but got caught and forced to give him a remedy. Norwich ascertains that there is no evidence to suggest that this happened and that it probably comes from a perspective that supports Bohemond as the heir to Robert's titles. Sikelgaita had all right to be concerned by Bohemund even though the two eventually came to an agreement under which her son Roger Borsa was allowed to succeed Robert in the duchy. It did not stop Bohemund from seeing his legal right to his father's inheritance as the senior child. Fortunately for Sikelgaita, Bohemund found little support among the Roger Borsa's vassals.

Early in 1086, Sikelgaita was in Salerno donating the town of Cetraro in Robert's honour to Monte Cassino, which the couple had endowed well throughout their married life. Sikelgaita donated a large amount of silver for her health while she was ill on another occasion. She later died on 16 April 1090 and was buried in Monte Cassino "at her request".

== Issue ==
William of Apulia wrote in his poem that Robert had through Sikelgaita "three sons and five daughters":

- Maud, the eldest married Raymond Berengar II of Barcelona and then Aimeric I, Viscount of Narbonne.
- Roger Borsa
- Guy
- Robert Scalio
- Sybil, married Ebles II, Count of Roucy.
- Mabel, married William de Grandmesnil.
- Unnamed daughter, married Hugh V, Count of Maine.
- Olympias, betrothed to Konstantios Doukas, son of Michael VII Ducas and Maria Bagrationi, in 1074 and given the name Helena.

Historian Ferdinand Chalandon found two additional daughters to Robert and Sikelgaita:

- Cecilia, of whom nothing is known.
- Gaitelgrima, who married first a man called Drogo and then another called Humphrey.

== Sikelgaita in pop culture ==
- Sikelgaita is featured as a non-playable character in Age of Empires II: Definitive Edition through the Lords of the West expansion. She appears in the "Bohemond and the Emperor" scenario as a villain, being Bohemond's wicked stepmother who refuses to help him fight the Normans, with the closing cutscene showing Robert Guiscard's death from illness, with speculation that she poisoned him.
- An image of Sikelgaita is featured in the Fontana di Sikelgaita.
