= Fontana di Sikelgaita =

Coordinates: 39°33′23″N 16°07′12″E

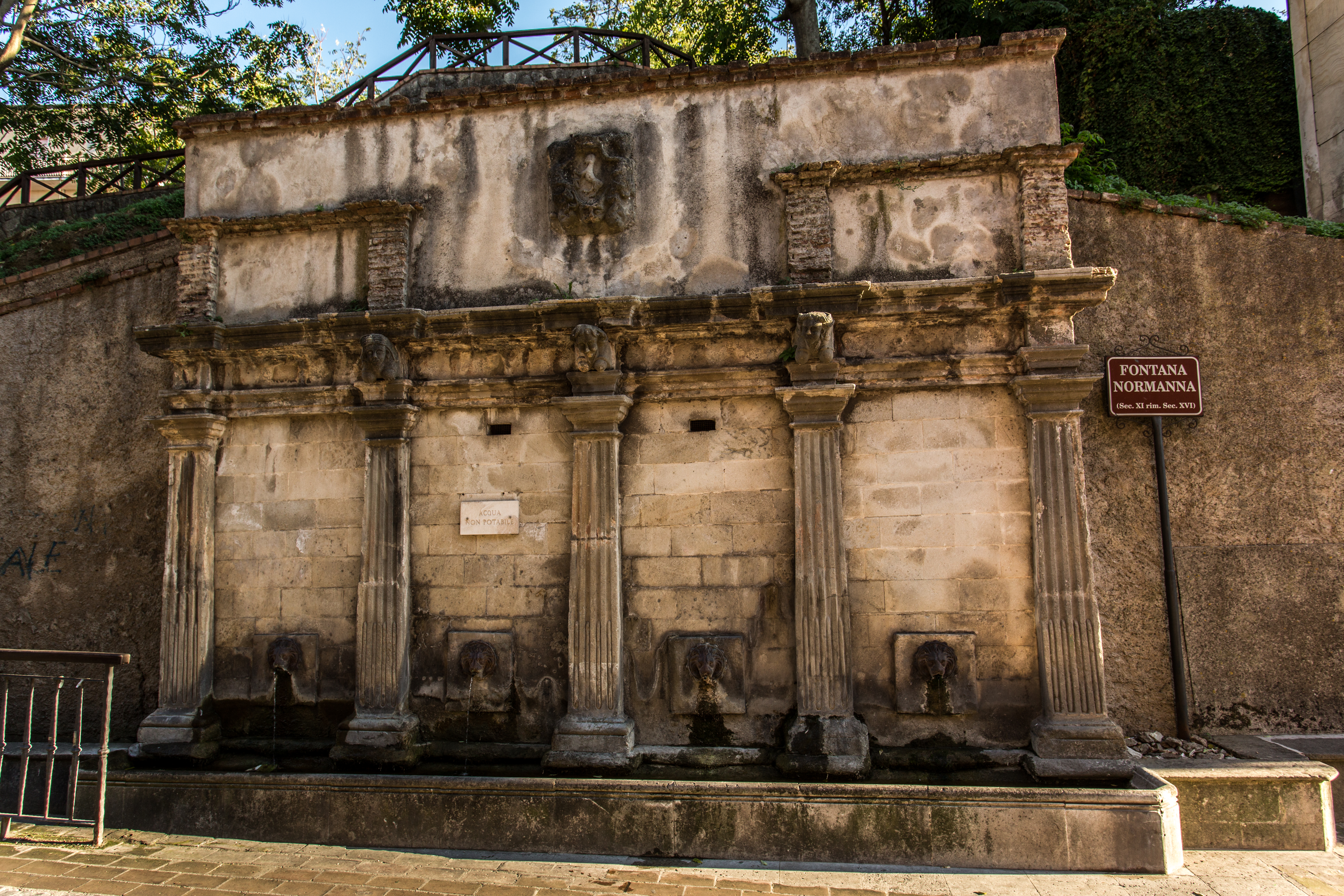
Fontana de Sikelgaita

The Fontana di Sikelgaita, also known as the Fontana Normanna, also known as the Fountain of Saint Mark, is an 11th-century fountain in San Marco Argentano, Calabria, Italy.

== Location ==
The fountain is in the historic center of the town of San Marco Argentano, which was historically the headquarters of Robert Guiscard in the 11th century. The fountain is located in front of the Church of San Marco Evangelista.

== Description ==
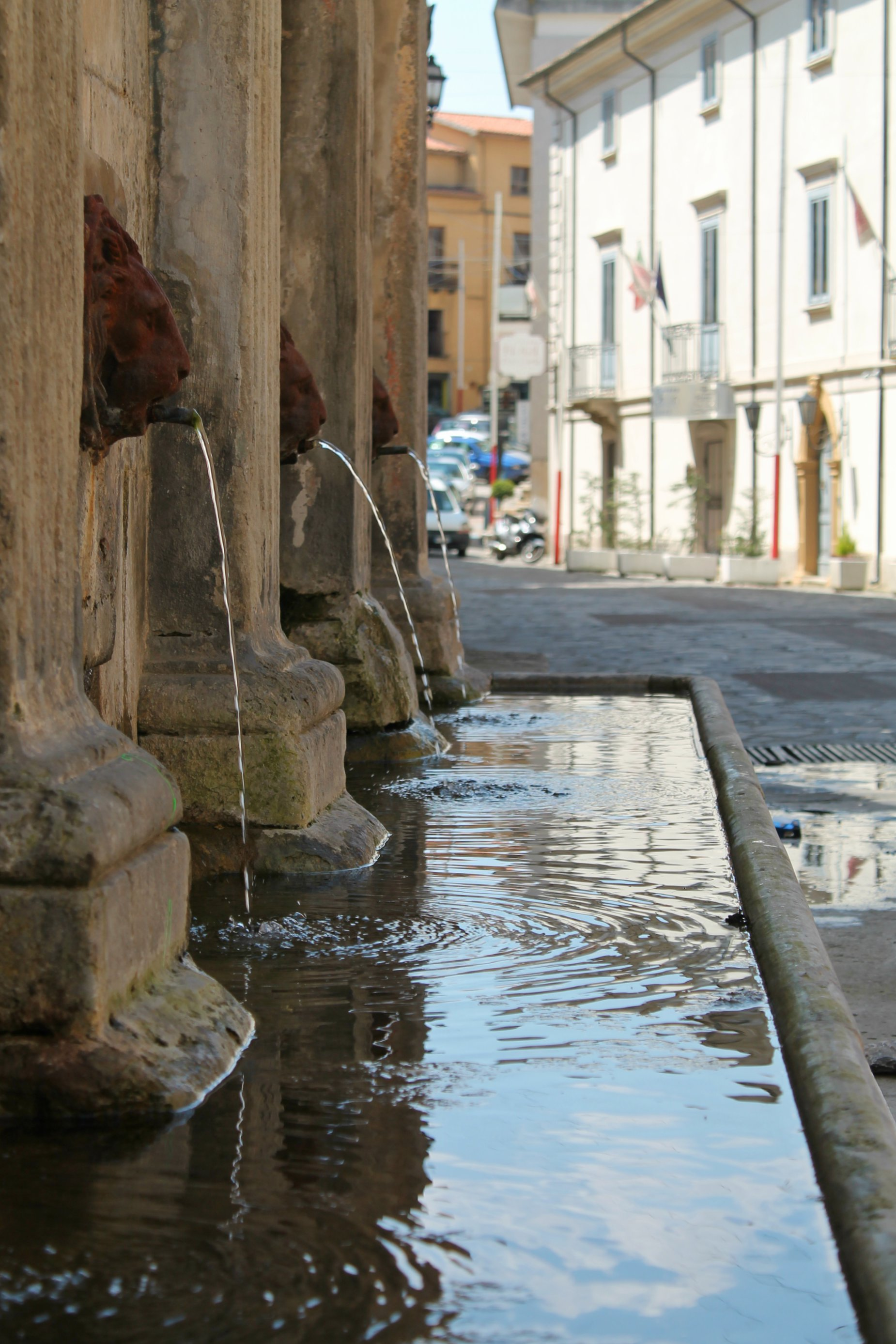
The fountain's water trough

The fountain is relatively flat-faced, with five columns and three caryatids (named Sikelgaita, Virtù, and Smorfiosa). The three female busts spit water into a water trough below.

== History ==
The original fountain was built when the town was under the rule of Robert Guiscard in the 1000s. The fountain is named after Sikelgaita, his second wife. Supposedly, the caryatid on the far left of the fountain is designed to look like Sikelgaita, and the one on the right looks like Alberada of Buonalbergo, Robert's first wife. The fountain has been modified several times, and currently retains its 16th-century appearance. All that remains of the original 11th-century fountain is the water trough and the caryatids.
