= Guigues I of Albon =

French noble (c.1000–1070)

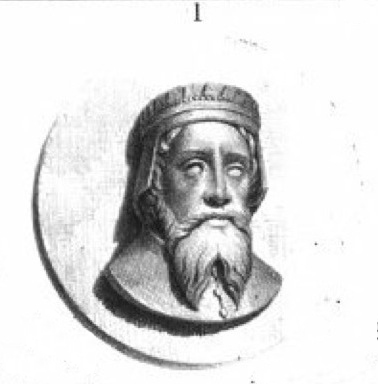
Guigues I, Count of Albon.

Guigues I (born c. 1000, died in 1070 at Cluny), was Count of Oisans, Grésivaudan, and Briançonnais. He was the son of Guigues d'Albon and Gotelana de Clérieux. At the time these territories were in the Kingdom of Arles, which was made part of the Holy Roman Empire in 1033.

== Biography ==
The official history written by George de Manteyer has caused him to be known as the first Dauphin of Viennois, despite this designation only appearing a century later. Guigues was an ambitious minor noble who extended his domain between the Rhone and the Alps. In 1016, he is called "count" in a charter concerning his possessions in Moirans. Thereafter, he was a landowner in Champsaur (1027), in Oisans with the title of count (1035), Grésivaudan (around 1050), Briançonnais (around 1053), and in the valley of Oulx (1070).

From 1035, he was always dignified with the title of "count". It is not known how Guigues took possession of the lands, but his power enabled him to install family members as bishop. Guy's uncle de Guigues was bishop of Grenoble, and succeeded Isarn. The episcopate then passed to a cousin, Mallen. His brother was bishop of Valence and the archbishop's palace at Vienne, attached to the most prestigious church of the province, was in the hands of a cousin by marriage.

He married Adelaide, who seems to be of the family of the counts de Turin, and had a son, Guigues II (1025–1079), who succeeded him. His elder son, Humbert, was dedicated to becoming bishop.

At the end of his life, Guigues retired to Cluny in Burgundy where he died in 1070.

== Sources ==
- http://www.atelierdesdauphins.com/histo/guigues1.htm

Preceded by beginning of the county	comte in Grésivaudan ?	Succeeded by Guigues II
