= Fontfroide Abbey =

Former Cistercian monastery in Languedoc, France

Coordinates: 43°07′39″N 2°53′54″E

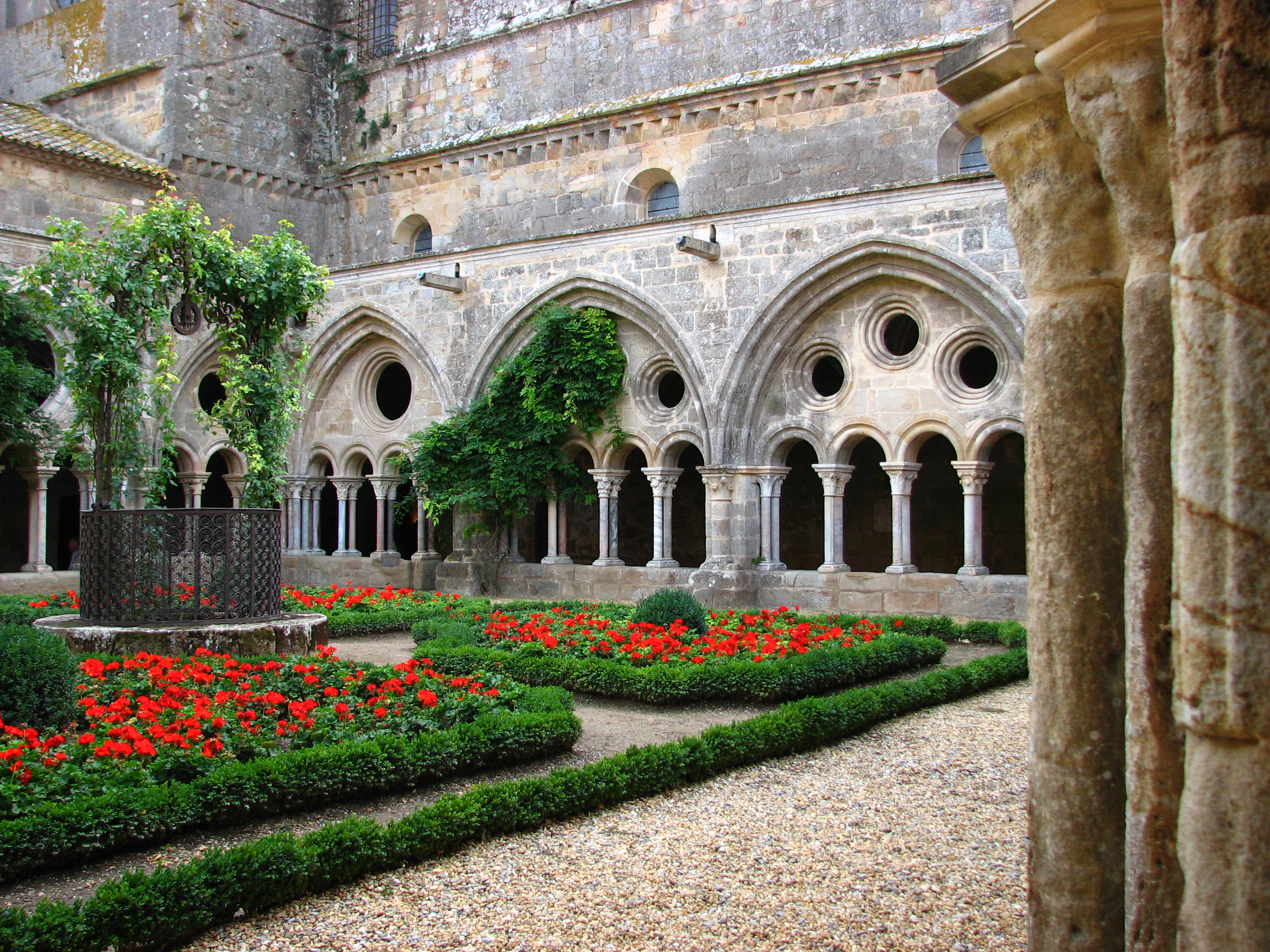
Fontfroide Abbey: cloister

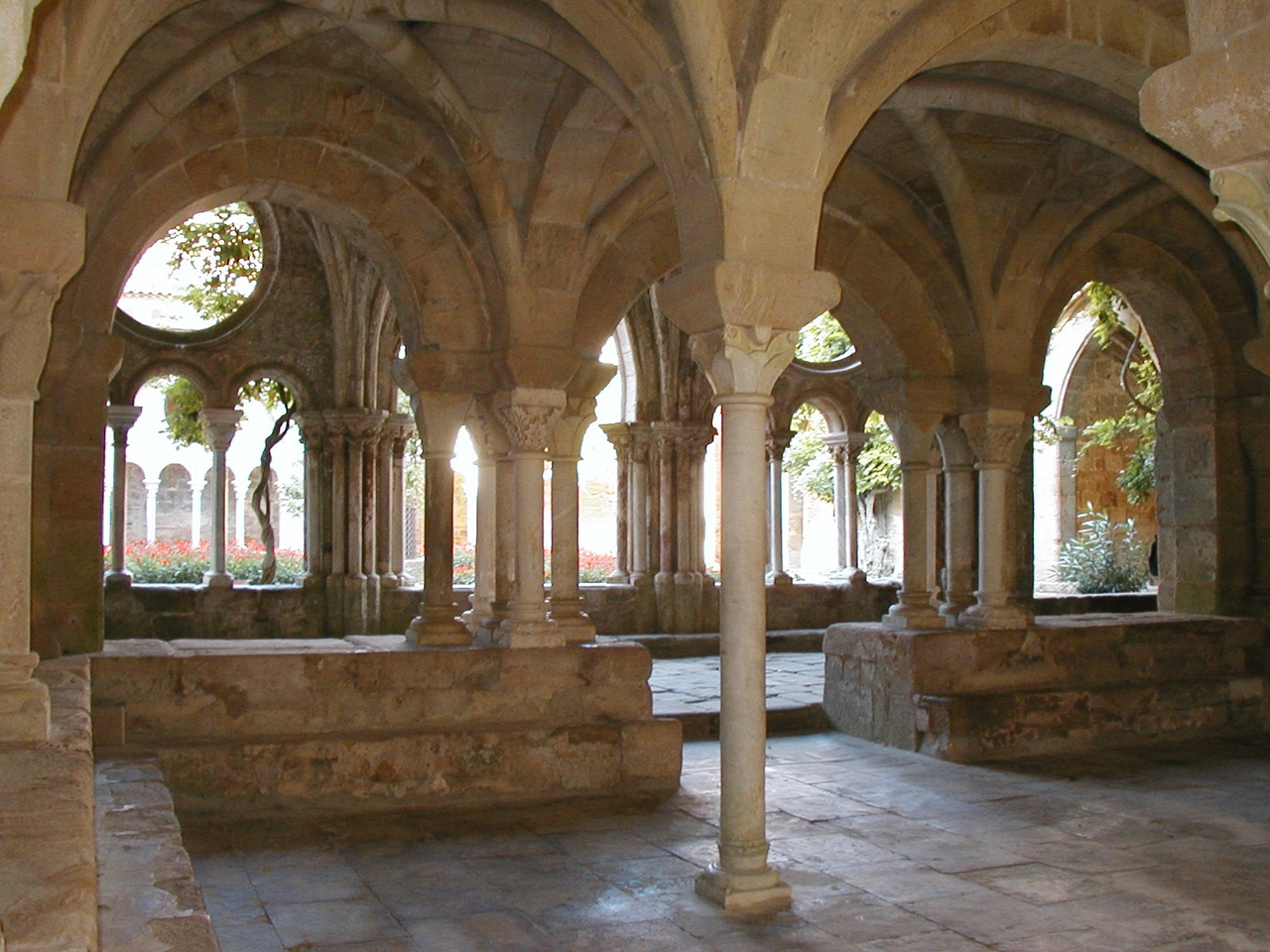
Fontfroide Abbey: chapter house

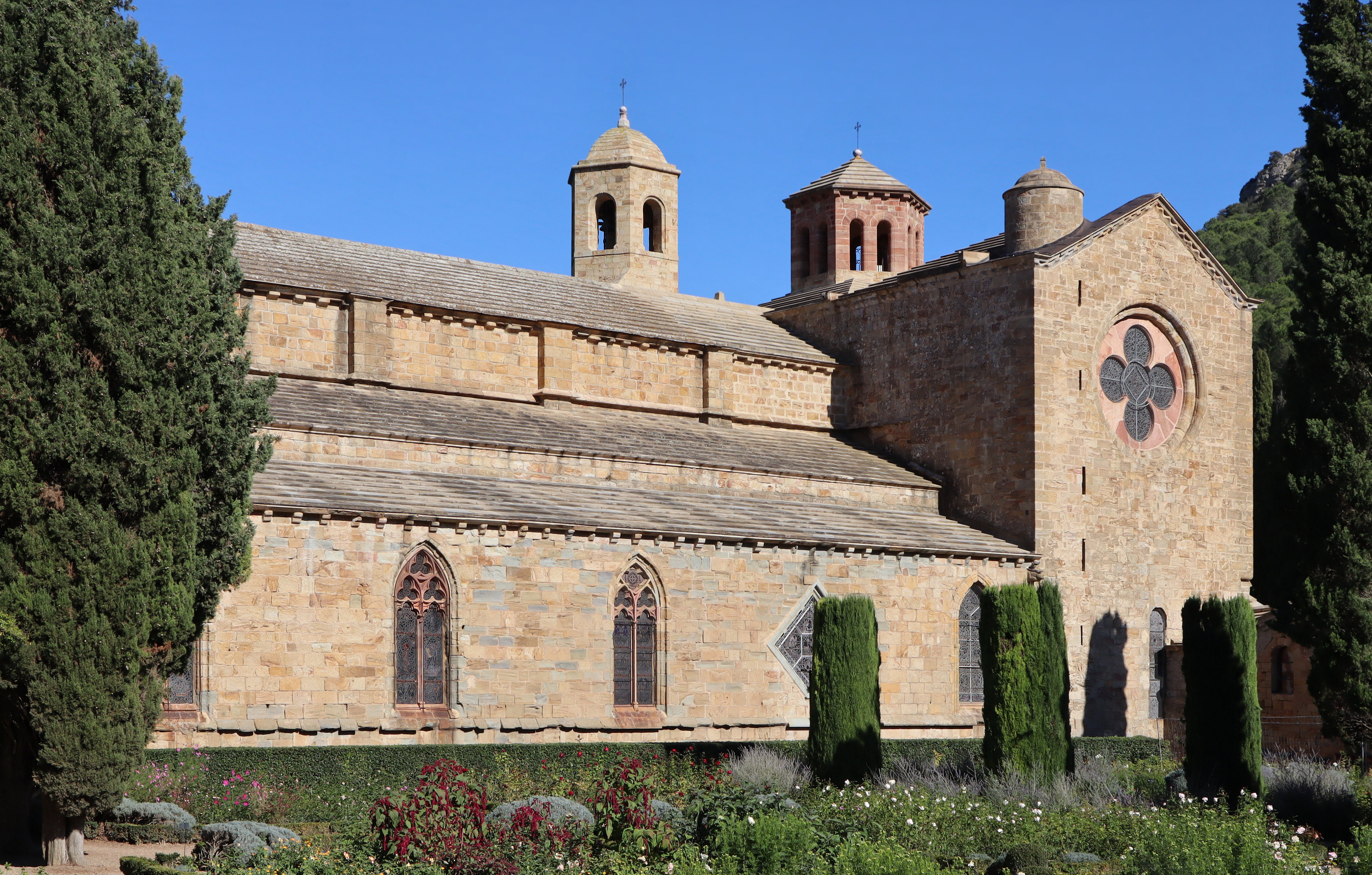
The abbey church

Fontfroide Abbey (French: Abbaye Sainte-Marie de Fontfroide; Latin: Fons frigidus) is a former Cistercian monastery in France, situated 15 kilometers south-west of Narbonne near to the Spanish border.

It was founded in 1093 by Aimery I, Viscount of Narbonne, but remained poor and obscure, and needed to be re-founded by Ermengarde, Viscountess of Narbonne. In 1144 it affiliated itself to the Cistercian reform movement. Shortly afterwards the Count of Barcelona gave it the land in Spain that was to form the great Catalan monastery of Poblet, of which Fontfroide counts as the mother house, and in 1157 the Viscountess Ermengard of Narbonne granted it a great quantity of land locally, thus securing its wealth and status.

The abbey fought together with Pope Innocent III against the Cathars, a Christian movement which the Catholic church had declared to be heretical, and which had a strong presence in the region.

The Black Death, which reached Narbonne in 1348, decimated almost the entire community. It was dissolved in 1791 in the course of the French Revolution but was re-founded in 1858 by monks from Sénanque Abbey. In 1901, because of the French legal changes, the community was driven out of France and went into exile in Spain: the abbey was abandoned. The premises, which are of very great architectural interest, passed into private hands in 1908, when the artists Gustave and Madeleine Fayet d'Andoque bought it to protect the fabric of the buildings from an American collector of sculpture. They restored it over a number of years and used it as a centre for artistic projects.

It still remains in private hands. Today wine is produced here of the AOC Corbières quality under the French appellations system. It also has a small working farm, bookstore and restaurant and takes paying guests.

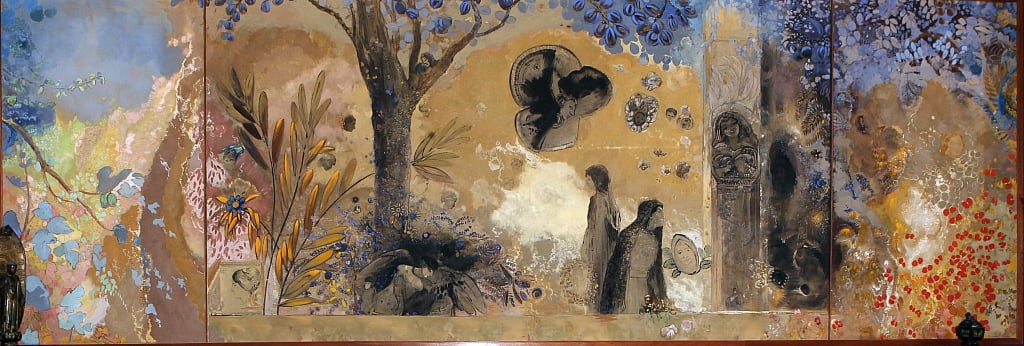
The Night, c. 1910-1911, part of a series of decorative panels by Odilon Redon, commissioned by Gustave Fayet and located in the Fontfroide Abbey library
