= Ramon Berenguer III of Barcelona =

12th c. Catalan ruler and Holy Roman Empire nobleman

Ramon Berenguer III
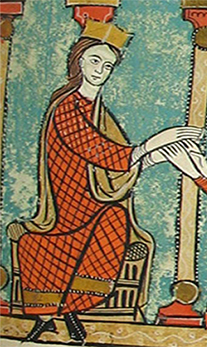
- Ramon Berenguer in the late 12th-century Liber feudorum maior

Count of Barcelona
- Reign: 1086–1131
- Predecessor: Berenguer Ramon II
- Successor: Ramon Berenguer IV
- Born: 11 November 1082; Rodez, Viscounty of Rodez
- Died: 23 January/19 July 1131 (aged 48); Barcelona
- Buried: Santa Maria de Ripoll
- Noble family: Barcelona
- Spouses: María Rodríguez de Vivar; Almodis; Douce I of Provence
- Issue Detail: María; Jimena or Eixemena; Almodis; Berenguela or Berengaria; Ramon Berenguer IV, Count of Barcelona; Berenguer Ramon I, Count of Provence
- Father: Ramon Berenguer II
- Mother: Maud of Apulia

Ramon Berenguer III the Great (11 November 1082 – 23 January or 19 July 1131) was the count of Barcelona, Girona, and Ausona from 1086 (jointly with Berenguer Ramon II and solely from 1097), Besalú from 1111, Cerdanya from 1117, and count of Provence in the Holy Roman Empire, from 1112, all until his death in Barcelona in 1131. As Ramon Berenguer I, he was Count of Provence in right of his wife.

== Biography ==
Born on 11 November 1082 in Rodez, Viscounty of Rodez, County of Toulouse, Francia, he was the son of Ramon Berenguer II. He succeeded his father to co-rule with his uncle Berenguer Ramon II. He became the sole ruler in 1097, when Berenguer Ramon II was forced into exile.

Responding to increased raids into his lands by the Almoravids in 1102, Ramon counter-attacked, assisted by Ermengol V, Count of Urgell, but was defeated and Ermengol killed at the battle of Mollerussa.

During his rule Catalan interests were extended on both sides of the Pyrenees. By marriage or vassalage he incorporated into his realm almost all of the Catalan counties (except Urgell and Peralada). He inherited the counties of Besalú (1111) and Cerdanya (1117) and in between married Douce, heiress of Provence (1112). His dominions then stretched as far east as Nice.

In alliance with the Count of Urgell, Ramon Berenguer conquered Balaguer. He also established relations with the Italian maritime republics of Pisa and Genoa, and in 1114 and 1115 attacked with Pisa the then-Muslim islands of Mallorca and Ibiza. They became his tributaries and many Christian slaves there were recovered and set free. Ramon Berenguer also raided mainland Muslim dependencies with Pisa's help, such as Valencia, Lleida and Tortosa. In 1116, Ramon traveled to Rome to petition Pope Paschal II for a crusade to liberate Tarragona. By 1118 he had captured and rebuilt Tarragona, which became the metropolitan seat of the church in Catalonia (before that, Catalans had depended ecclesiastically on the archbishopric of Narbonne).

In 1127, Ramon Berenguer signed a commercial treaty with the Genoese. On 14 July 1130, toward the end of his life, he became an associate member of the Templars. He gave his five Catalan counties to his eldest son Ramon Berenguer IV and Provence to the younger son Berenguer Ramon.

He died on 23 January/19 July 1131 and was buried in the Santa Maria de Ripoll monastery.

== Marriages and descendants ==
- Ramon's first wife was María Rodríguez de Vivar, second daughter of El Cid (died ca. 1105). They had three daughters.
  - María, married Bernat III, Count of Besalú (died 1111)
  - Jimena (died 1136), also known as Eixemena, married Roger III, Count of Foix
  - Estefania, married Centule II, Count of Bigorre
- His second wife Almodis produced no children.
- His third wife was Douce (Dolça de Gévaudaun), heiress of Provence (died ca. 1127). Their union produced at seven children:
  - Ramon Berenguer IV, Count of Barcelona (1113/1114–1162) married Petronilla of Aragon, daughter of Ramiro II, King of Aragón
  - Berenguer Ramon I, Count of Provence (ca. 1115–1144)
  - Bernat, died young
  - Berenguela or Berengaria (1116–1149), married Alfonso VII of Castile
  - Almodis, married Ponce de Cervera, mother of Agalbursa, who married Barisone II of Arborea.
  - Etiennette, married firstly to Centule II, Count of Bigorre with issue. Secondly, to Raymond II of Dax.
  - Matilda, married firstly to Jasper, Viscount of Castelnou. Married secondly to William Raymond II of Castellvell. She was the paternal grandmother of Guilleuma de Castellvell, mother of William II, Viscount of Béarn.
  - Douce, married to Guy de Sévérac.

== Sources ==
- Cheyette, Fredric L. (2001). Ermengard of Narbonne and the World of the Troubadours. Cornell University Press. ISBN 978-0801439520.
- Graham-Leigh, Elaine (2005). The Southern French Nobility and the Albigensian Crusade. The Boydell Press. ISBN 1843831295.
- Nicholson, Helen (2010). A Brief History of the Knights Templar. Constable & Robinson Ltd. ISBN 978-1849011006.
- Phillips, Jonathan P. (2007). The Second Crusade: Extending the Frontiers of Christendom. Yale University Press. ISBN 978-0300112740.
- Reilly, Bernard F. (1995). The Contest Christian and Muslim Spain: 1031–1157. Blackwell Publishing. ISBN 063116913X.
- Reilly, Bernard F. (2003). The Medieval Spains. Cambridge University Press. ISBN 0521397413.
- Sabaté, Flocel, ed. (2017). The Crown of Aragon: A Singular Mediterranean Empire. Brill. ISBN 978-9004349605.
- Upton-Ward, J.M. (1992). The Rule of the Templars: The French Text of the Rule of the Order of the Knights Templar. The Boydell Press. ISBN 9780851157016.

Preceded by Berenguer Ramon II	Count of Osona; 1086–1107 with Berenguer Ramon II (1082–1097)	Succeeded by Jimena
Preceded by Berenguer Ramon II	Count of Barcelona; 1086–1131 with Berenguer Ramon II (1082–1097)	Succeeded by Ramon Berenguer IV
Preceded by Bernard William	Count of Cerdanya; 1118–1131	Succeeded by Ramon Berenguer IV
Preceded by Douce I	Count of Provence; 1112–1131 with Douce I (1112–1127)	Succeeded by Berenguer Ramon
