= Aimery II of Narbonne =

Viscount of Narbonne

Aimery II (also called Aimeric II) (died 17 July 1134) was the Viscount of Narbonne from around 1106 until his death.

He was the eldest son of Aimery I of Narbonne and Mahalt (also Mahault or Mafalda), daughter of Robert Guiscard and Sichelgaita and widow of Raymond Berengar II of Barcelona. This made him a half-brother of Raymond Berengar III. He initially ruled as a minor under the regency of his mother. After he came of age he married Ermengard.

Probably in 1112 or 1113, Aimery received the Fenouillèdes and the Peyrepertusès from his half-brother in return for swearing an oath of fealty against Bernard Ato IV of Béziers, with whom Raymond Berengar was at war. The lords of the Fenouillèdes and the Peyrepertuseès remained vassals of Narbonne until the Albigensian Crusade and the viscounts of Narbonne took the lordship of Rouffiac near Peyrepertuse into their own hands. When Douce I, Countess of Provence died and Raymond Berengar claimed the County of Provence, Aimery received the fief of Beaucaire and the terre d'Argence near the mouth of the Rhône in Provence.

Sometime during his rule, Aimery granted the merchants of Narbonne the right to form a consulate in imitation of Genoa. Probably he saw the self-organisation of his merchants and their formation of a military in their own defence as an aid to his own rule so long as the consulate remained under vicecomital control, which in the end it did not. Aimery also participated in 1114–15 in the Balearic Islands expedition led by the Republic of Pisa and Raymond Berengar.

In 1114, Aimery put an end to conflicting claims in the village of Le Lac on the Via Domitia by transferring his rights there to the abbey of Lagrasse in return for a large loan of gold and silver. He also entered into a conflict with his cousin Richard de Millau, Archbishop of Narbonne, who may have been a compromise candidate between Aimery and the pope for the archiepiscopal throne. Richard claimed that Aimery fecit mihi hominium propriis manibus ("did homage to [him] with his own hands") received fedovia ("fiefs") from the Church "in the presence of the universal synod of the province of Narbonne." The archbishop accused Aimery of deceiving him concerning the extent of the Church's fiefs and attempting to hold land as his by inheritance which was his by grant of the Church; he also accused Aimery of withholding revenues from taxes and imposts that should have gone to the Church. Aimery was recorded to have even abused church property violently and there were disputes concerning who controlled the towers on the city walls. The whole dispute lasted a long time, but Aimery was made to come to terms by the Papacy's support of Richard. In the end, he had to swear oaths of fealty to the archbishop, recognise the archbishop's independent temporal lordship, and concede that some of the rights he held in the city of Narbonne constituted a fief of the archbishopric.

In 1124, Bernard Ato of Béziers declared war on Aimery, who responded by razing the castle (pro justicia, "out of justice") at Montséret, which had been held by Aimery's vassal Bernard Amati until he had treacherously turned it over to Bernard Ato. Not long after this Aimery turned towards Iberia and joined the Reconquista being waged by Alfonso the Battler in the Ebro valley.

In July 1131, Aimery was at the deathbed of his half-brother to witness his final testament, of which he was to be the executor. Aimery died in battle before the walls of the Moorish city of Fraga, which Alfonso had been besieging. Aimery had a son and a daughter by Ermengard; the son, Aimery, predeceased him (ca. 1130), and he was succeeded by his daughter Ermengard, who was only four or five at the time. He married a second time to a woman named Ermessende and left by her a daughter of the same name. This second daughter, Ermessende, married before 1153 a great Castilian magnate, Manrique Pérez de Lara, lord of Molina.

== Sources ==
- Cheyette, Fredric L. Ermengard of Narbonne and the World of the Troubadours. Ithaca: Cornell University Press, 2001.
