= Berenguer Ramon II =

Count of Barcelona
- Reign: 1076–1097
- Predecessor: Ramon Berenguer I
- Successor: Ramon Berenguer III
- Born: 1053 or 1054
- Died: 1097 or 1099 (aged 43–46)
- House: Barcelona
- Father: Ramon Berenguer I
- Mother: Almodis of La Marche

Berenguer Ramon II "the Fratricide" (1053/54 – 1097/99) was count of Barcelona from 1076 to 1097. He was the son of Ramon Berenguer I and Almodis of La Marche, and initially ruled jointly with his twin brother Ramon Berenguer II.

== Life ==
Born in 1053 or 1054, Berenguer Ramon succeeded his father Ramon Berenguer I "the Old" in 1076 to co-rule with his twin brother Ramon Berenguer II. The twins failed to cooperate, leading Pope Gregory VII to appeal for their reconciliation in 1079. The Catalonian possessions were divided between them, against the will of their late father, and it was agreed that the brothers would alternate their residence at the palace in Barcelona every six months. When the first agreement inevitably fell through, a second was reached in December of 1080.

Ramon Berenguer II was killed two years later while hunting in the woods on 5 December 1082. Berenguer Ramon II, who became the sole ruler of Catalonia for the next four years, was popularly suspected of orchestrating this murder, earning his nickname “the Fratricide.” This suspicion and other divisions of loyalty led to a civil war, weakening the authority of Barcelona over the counties of Carcassonne and Razès while various parties asserted ways to resolve this ‘unjust and iniquitous murder.’ In 1085, the count of Cerdanya was chosen by the bishop of Vic and an assembly of Catalonian magnates to avenge Ramon Berenguer II, but in June 1086, a compromise was reached, allowing Berenguer Ramon to continue his rule of Barcelona as regent for his brother's four-year-old son Ramon Berenguer III until he came of age. Ramon Berenguer III began to appear in documents as “count” as soon as 1089.

== Conflict with El Cid ==
In the 1080s, Berenguer Ramon's involvement in the internal strife in the Moorish taifa kingdoms brought him in conflict with El Cid, whose service had been refused by the count of Barcelona in 1081. In the ensuing war Berenguer Ramon was twice taken prisoner. Upon the death of Ahmad al-Muqtadir in 1081/1082, the count allied with al-Muqtadir’s younger son Mundhir al-Hajib to seize Zaragoza from his older brother Yusuf al-Mu’taman. Berenguer Ramon and al-Hajib laid siege to Almenar, near Lleida, where they were attacked and defeated by El Cid. Berenguer and his knights were captured, taken to al-Mu’taman, and released for a ransom shortly after.

By 1090, al-Hajib and Berenguer had made several attempts to conquer Valencia which was ruled by Yahya al-Qadir as a vassalage of Alfonso VI of León and Castile. After the compromise in 1086, Berenguer Ramon and al-Hajib had ravaged the surrounding countryside and unsuccessfully besieged the city in 1088 and 1089, but the freshly outlawed El Cid again stood in their way the following year. El Cid collected the tributes from al-Qadir and al-Hajib owed to Alfonso and Berenguer, respectively, leading to the formation of a coalition between Alfonso, Berenguer, Sancho Ramírez of Navarre, and al-Musta’in II of Zaragoza to oppose El Cid. The coalition quickly fell apart, and Berenguer was left to challenge El Cid alone.

Berenguer marched out with his army and made camp near the mountainside pinewood of Tévar where El Cid had encamped. Both men attempted to provoke the other through an exchange of letters in which Berenguer accused El Cid of violating churches and trusting in ornithomancy while El Cid reminded the count of his defeat in 1082 and alluded to his alleged fratricide. In the subsequent battle, El Cid’s forces broke through the Catalan formation, defeating and capturing the count a second time. After his release, Berenguer went to Zaragoza where al-Musta’in mediated a peace conducted by letter between him and El Cid who had withdrawn to Daroca to recover from his wounds.

== Attacks on Tortosa ==
In 1089, Pope Urban II sought to recover the archbishopric of Tarragona from the Muslims, promising the remission of sins to anyone who participated in the restoration effort. Berenguer Ramon undertook this endeavor in 1090 and agreed to pay a tribute to the papacy and allow its suzerainty over Barcelona’s territories. This was possibly done under pressure from Bishop Berenguer of Vic, later archbishop of Tarragona. Three years later, Berenguer Ramon launched an unsuccessful campaign against Tortosa to secure the territories surrounding the newly settled Tarragona and expand the county of Barcelona. 400 ships employed from Genoa and Pisa contributed to the siege.

== Death and succession ==
Berenguer Ramon resigned the countship in 1097. After that his life became more obscure. Still living under the accusations of his brother's assassination, the guilt of which may have been determined by trial by combat at the court of Alfonso VI, which he lost, he joined his half-brother Raymond of Saint-Gilles in the First Crusade as a penance. It is possible that he perished on the walls of Jerusalem in 1099.

== Notes ==
| Preceded by Ramon Berenguer I | Count of Barcelona; 1075–1097 with Ramon Berenguer II (1075–1082) and Ramon Berenguer III (1086–1097) | Succeeded by Ramon Berenguer III |
