= Guigues II of Albon =

Guigues II d'Albon, known as the Fat (Pinguis), born around 1025 and died around 1079, was count in Grésivaudan and Briançonnais from 1070 to 1079, count of Albon in 1079. He came from the House of Albon. During this time these areas were in the Kingdom of Arles which was part of the Holy Roman Empire from 1033.

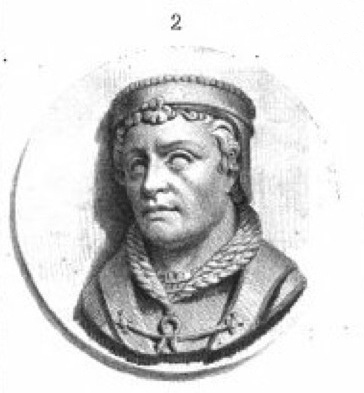
Guigues II, Count of Albon.

He bears the cognomen “le Gras”, (Guigo Pinguis or Guigo Crassus). The numbering of the Guigonides in the House of Albon is different according to the references.

== Biography ==
Guigues was born, around the 1025 or 1032. He was the son of Guigues I of Albon and Adelaide (Adelsindis/Adalsendis) from 1035 to 1052. A tradition, taken up in particular by the Europäische Stammtafeln, indicates that she could be Adelaide of Turin, daughter of Count Humbert "with White Hands", established in Maurienne, but this fact is not based on a known act.

He had properties in Albon, in Grésivaudan around Grenoble (Cornillon, Oriol, Varces) as well as in Briançon. At that time, the lands of Guigues had no geographical unity.

The Saint-Robert priory was built in Saint-Égrève in 1070, by monks, under the dependency of the Benedictine Abbey of La Chaise-Dieu in Haute Loire.

== Family ==
He married before 3 April 1052 to Pétronille, probably the daughter of Artaud de Royans and Pétronille (according to Georges de Manteyer), who was the sister of the Prince of Royans, Ismidon, branch of the Counts of Valentinois and sister also of the bishop of Grenoble Artaud according to Benjamin Oury and Aurelien Le Coq.

They had issue:

- Guigues III († after 1131), Count of Albon
- Adelaide

In 1070, Count Guigues II gave his fiancée Inès (Agnès) of Barcelona, daughter of Raymond-Bérenger I, Count of Barcelona and Almodis de la Marche, the castle of Albon, Moras, Vals, the villa of Saint-Donat with its territory and all its locations with the exception of Clérieu, Serves and Chevrières; he also attributes to her properties in Graisivaudan, Cornillon-en-Trièves, Varces and Oriol and the castle of Briançon. He is titled as Count of Albon and died around 1079. Note that in this act Guigues-Raymond is cited as his brother and not his son, which is genealogically plausible, the latter having died after 1096, hence the hypothesis retained by the "Foundation for Medieval Genealogy" of a late second marriage of Guigues I of Albon with Inès (Agnès) of Barcelona, in this case it is the first act of 1070 of the Regeste Dauphinois which is false, in this meaning that he names Guigues (Le Gras) betrothed to Agnès.

Their son is:

- Guigues-Raymond d'Albon, quoted indirectly in the will of Raymond-Bérenger I in 1076, married around 1085 to Ide de Forez, daughter of Artaud II or IV de Forez and Raymonde, divorced from Renaud II, Count of Nevers.

== See as well ==
=== Related articles ===
- Albon County
- Viennese Dauphiné

=== External links ===
- Guigues II [archive], on the website of the Atelier des Dauphins

== Bibliography ==
- Ulysse Chevalier, Regeste dauphinois, or Chronological and analytical directory of printed documents and manuscripts relating to the history of Dauphiné, from the Christian origins to the year 1349. Impr. valentinoise, 1913–1926, T1, fascicles 1–3, read online [archive]

== Sources ==
- Bernard Bligny, « Note sur l'origine et la signification du terme « dauphin » (de Viennois) », dans Marcel Durliat, Le monde animal et ses représentations iconographiques du XIe au XVe siècle, coll. « Actes des congrès de la Société des historiens médiévistes de l'enseignement supérieur public », 1984 (lire en ligne [archive]), p. 155-156.
- Léon Menabrea, Des origines féodales dans les Alpes occidentales, Imprimerie royale, 1865, 596 p. (lire en ligne [archive]), p. 165.
- Ulysse Chevalier (acte 1899), Regeste dauphinois, ou Répertoire chronologique et analytique des documents imprimés et manuscrits relatifs à l'histoire du Dauphiné, des origines chrétiennes à l'année 1349 (T1, fascicules 1–3), vol. 1, Valence, Imp. valentinoise, 1913 (lire en ligne [archive]), p. 321
