= Aimery I of Narbonne =

Viscount of Narbonne (c. 1071 – 1104/5)

- Viscount of Narbonne
- Reign: 1071 – c. 1105 (died in the Holy Land)
- Predecessor: Bernard Bérenger of Narbonne
- Successor: Aimery II of Narbonne
- Born: c. 1071
- Died: c. 1106 (died in the Holy Land); Holy Land
- Noble family: House of Narbonne
- Spouse: Mahaut of Apulia
- Issue: Aimery II of Narbonne; Bernard (Bernard Raimond); Guiscard; Bérenger, Archbishop of Narbonne
- Father: Bernard Bérenger of Narbonne
- Mother: Foy of Rouergue

Aimery I of Narbonne, son of Bernard Berenger of Narbonne and Foy of Rouergue. He was viscount of Narbonne 1071 until his death in the Holy Land in 1106.

== Biography ==
Quite young when his father Viscount Bernard died, the first years of Aimery take place in the shadow of his uncle, Pierre Bérenger, who asserted his hold on Narbonne both as viscount and as archbishop of Narbonne, despite the opposition of the pope and his legates. The government of Aimery is especially marked by its clashes with the archbishops Dalmace of Narbonne and Bertrand of Montredon for the control of Narbonne.

According to a missing charter referred to in later documents, in 1093 Aimery authorized a group of Benedictine monks to settle in the forest of Fontfroide, a modest starting point for what would later become one of the most powerful monasteries in the region, Cistercian Abbey of Fontfroide.

Leaving for the Holy Land around 1103, Aimery died soon after. His eldest son Aymeri II succeeded him.

== Marriage and descent ==
Between 1085 and 1087, Aimery married Mahaut of Apulia, daughter of Robert Guiscard, duke of Apulia. They had:

- Aimery II (died in 1134), viscount of Narbonne, his successor
- Bernard, also says Bernard Raimond (attested in 1103)
- Guiscard (attested in 1103)
- Bérenger (died in 1162), first monk at the abbey of Saint-Pons-de-Thomières (1103), and then abbot de Lagrasse (1114 / 1117-1156) and Archbishop of Narbonne (1156-1162)

== Sources ==
- Graham-Leigh, Elaine (2005). The Southern French Nobility and the Albigensian Crusade. The Boydell Press.
- Grèzes-Rueff, François (1977). "L'abbaye de Fontfroide et son domaine foncier aux XIIe-XIIIe siècles" (PDF). Annales du Midi (in French). 89 (133): 253–280. doi:10.3406/anami.1977.1683.
- Stasser, Thierry (1993). "La maison vicomtale de Narbonne aux Xe et XIe siècles". Annales du Midi (in French). 105 (204): 489–507. doi:10.3406/anami.1993.2383.
