= Battle of Barcelona (disambiguation) =

Battle of Barcelona may refer to

- Raid on Barcelona (1115), a series of battles outside Barcelona between the Almoravids and the Catalans
- Battle of Barcelona (1359), a naval battle during the War of the Two Peters
- Battle of Barcelona (1642), a naval battle during the Franco-Spanish War (1635–1659)
- Landing at Barcelona (1704), an aborted landing taking place
- July 1936 military uprising in Barcelona, a battle between military mutineers and revolutionary militias
- "Battle of Barcelona", a nickname for the riots following the 1972 European Cup Winners' Cup final

== See also ==
- Siege of Barcelona (disambiguation)
