= Battle of Martorell =

Battle of Martorell may refer to:

- Battle of Martorell (1114), between Almoravid and Catalan forces during the Almoravid expedition to Catalonia (1114).
- Battle of Martorell (1641), between Catalan and Spanish forces during the Reapers' War.
