= Raid on Barcelona (1115) =

Almoravid raid against Barcelona (1115)

- Part of Reconquista
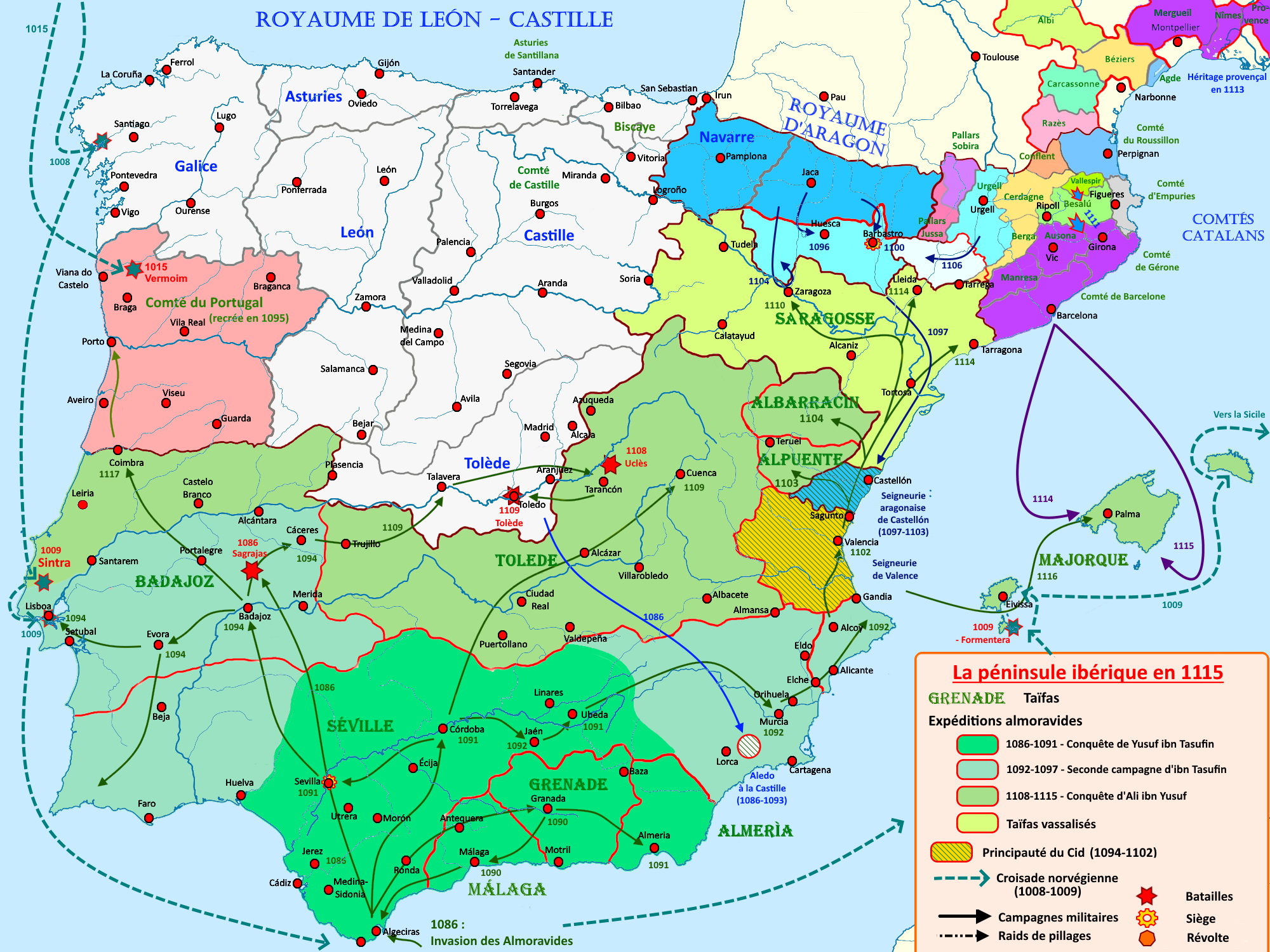
- Map of the Iberian Peninsula in 1115
Date	1115
Location	Barcelona, Spain
Result	See § Aftermath

Belligerents
Almoravid dynasty	County of Barcelona; Viscount of Narbonne

Commanders and leaders
Abu Bakr ibn Ibrahim ibn Tifilwit	Ramon Berenguer III

Strength
Unknown	Unknown

Casualties and losses
700 soldiers	Heavy

In 1115, forces of the Almoravid Emirate under the commander Abu Bakr ibn Ibrahim ibn Tifilwit and acting on the orders of the Emir Ali ibn Yusuf, carried out a raid against the city of Barcelona, the main city of the County of Barcelona.

== Background ==
Following the death of Muhammad ibn al-Hajj, the governor of Zaragoza, during the 1114 campaign in Catalonia, the Emir Ali ibn Yusuf appointed Abu Bakr ibn Ibrahim ibn Tifilwit as the new governor. The latter was also the governor of Murcia, Valencia, Tortosa and the rest of the Sharq al-Andalus. The emir ordered Abu Bakr to march on the County of Barcelona. The purpose of the attack was to avenge the death of Ibn al-Hajj.

During the raids of 1114–1115, Count Ramon Berenguer III of Barcelona was away on the Balearic Crusade. There are two sources for the 1115 raid: the contemporary Latin Liber maiolichinus, a poem about the Balearic expedition, and the later Arabic Rawd al-Qirtas of Ibn Abi Zar. While some historians questioned the account in the Rawd al-Qirtas, seeing it as a piece of propaganda, a successful doublet of the failed 1114 campaign, the Liber maiolichinus corroborates the reality of a second raid.

== Raid ==
Abu Bakr gathered all his forces and headed north, plundering and razing the lands around Barcelona. The Almoravid attack reached the gates of Barcelona, which was besieged for 20 days. The Rawd al-Qirtas described the attack:

The emir of the Muslims was much afflicted by [Ibn al-Hajj's] death and named in his place Abu Bakr ibn Ibrahim ibn Tifilwit, who was his governor in Murcia. While in Murcia, he received appointment to Valencia, Tortosa, Fraga and Zaragoza, with whose soldiers he left for Valencia, and uniting them with those that were there, with those in Zaragoza, he went against Barcelona and besieged it twenty days, desolated its territory and its fruits and ruined its farms [alquerías]; he left upon encountering Ibn Radmir with great forces from the Plain of Barcelona and from the country of Aragon, and in the battles they gave each other many Christians died and some seven hundred Muslims.

The church of Sant Andreu de Palomar and the monastery of Sant Pau del Camp were among the victims of the raid. News of the Almoravid attack on Barcelona reached the crusader camp in the Balearic Islands, leading to the withdrawal of the Catalan contingent under Count Ramon Berenguer III. He returned with the forces drawn from Barcelona and Narbonne and there were battles between the two sides. This is recorded in the Liber maiolichinus.

== Aftermath ==
After this campaign, the Almoravids returned to their lands. Before the end of the year or early in 1116, they had retaken the Balearic Islands.

The devastation wrought by the raiders was less than that inflicted on the city in the sack of 985, but the city's recovery was slower since the raid came at a time when the local economy was suffering. A document of June 1116 refers to frequent famines in the area. In 1127, the abandoned monastery of Sant Pau del Camp had to be handed over to the monastery of Sant Cugat. In 1132, Sant Andreu de Palomera was reconsecrated.

== Sources ==
- Alcover, Miguel (1930). El islam en Mallorca (707–1232) y la cruzada pisano-catalana (1113–1115). Palma de Mallorca: Escuela-Tipográfica Provincial.
- Annan, Muhammad Abdullah (1997). دولة الإسلام في [The State of Islam in Andalusia] (in Arabic). Vol. 3: عصر المرابطين والموحدين [The Era of Almoravids and Almohads] (5th ed.). Cairo: Al-Khanji Library.
- Barton, Thomas W. (2019). Victory's Shadow: Conquest and Governance in Medieval Catalonia. Cornell University Press.
- Bensch, Stephen P. (1995). Barcelona and Its Rulers, 1096–1291. Cambridge University Press.
- Bosch Vilá, Jacinto; Molina López, Emilio (1998). Los Almorávides (in Spanish). University of Granada. ISBN 9788433824516.
- Busqueta i Riu, Joan Josep (1988). "Comunitat rural i marc parroquial al Pla de Barcelona Aspectes de l'organització veïnal de Sant Andreu de Palomar a la Baixa Edat Mitjana". Acta Historica et Archaeologica Mediaevalia. 9: 361–389.
- Español Solana, Darío (2024-04-24). Yihad y Reconquista: Guerra en Aragón, Navarra y Cataluña, siglos XI-XII (in Spanish). Desperta Ferro Ediciones. ISBN 978-84-128068-4-7.
- Ferrer i Mallol, María Teresa; Riu i Riu, Manuel, eds. (2009). Tractats i negociacions diplomàtiques de Catalunya i de la Corona catalanoaragonesa a l'edat mitjana. Memòries de la Secció Històrico-Arqueològica (in Catalan). Barcelona: Institut d'Estudis Catalans. ISBN 978-84-92583-77-5.
- Grau Montserrat, Manuel (1958). "Contribución al estudio del estado cultural del valle del Ebro en el siglo XI y principios del XII" (PDF). Butlletí de la Reial Acadèmia de Bones Lletres de Barcelona. 27: 227–272.
- Hernandez Gimenez, Felix (1994). Estudios de geografía histórica española. "Biblioteca de arqueología medieval hispánica" ser. (in Spanish). Madrid: Ed. Polifemo. ISBN 978-84-86547-26-4.
- Houben, Hubert (2002). Roger II of Sicily: A Ruler Between East and West. Cambridge University Press. ISBN 978-0-521-65573-6.
- Ibn Abi Zar (1966). Rawd al-Qirtas. "Textos Medievales" ser., no. 12. Vol. 1. Translated by Ambrosio Huici Miranda. Valencia: J. Nácher.
- Kennedy, Hugh (1996). Muslim Spain and Portugal: A Political History of al-Andalus. Routledge. ISBN 978-1317870418.
- Sāmarrāʼī, Khalīl Ibrāhīm Ṣāliḥ; Ṭāhā, ʻAbd al-Wāḥid Dhannūn; Maṭlūb, Nāṭiq Ṣāliḥ, eds. (2000). تاريخ العرب وحضارتهم في الأندلس [History and Civilization of the Arabs in Andalusia] (in Arabic) (al-Ṭabʻah 1 ed.). Bayrūt: Dār al-Kitāb al-Jadīd al-Muttaḥīdah. ISBN 978-9959-29-015-1.
