= Battle of Martorell (1114) =

1114 battle during the Reconquista

- Part of the Almoravid expedition to Catalonia (1114), during the Reconquista
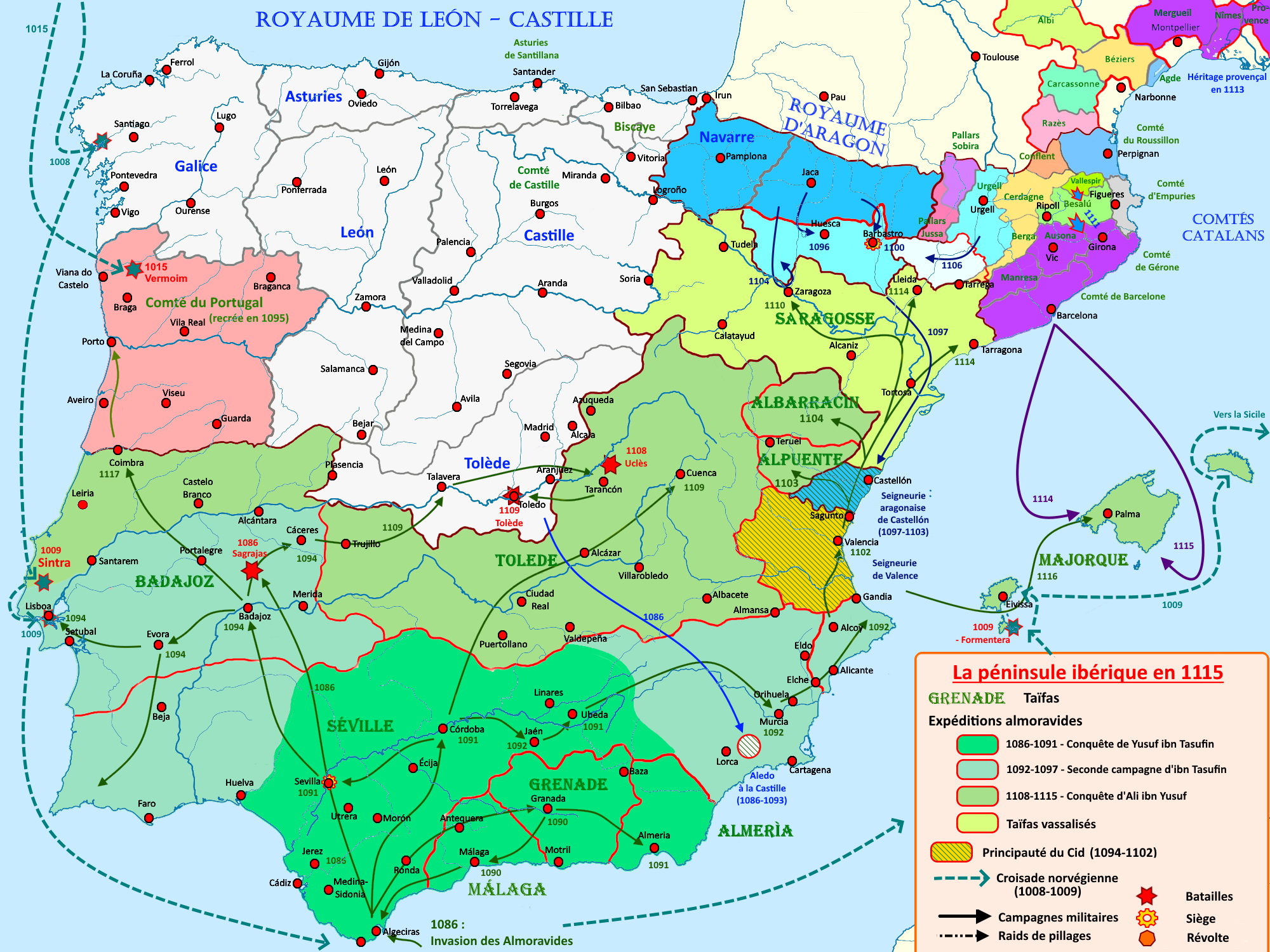
- The Iberian Peninsula in 1115
Date	1114
Location	Martorell, County of Barcelona
Result	Catalan victory

Belligerents
County of Barcelona; County of Urgell; County of Cerdaña	Almoravids

Commanders and leaders
Udalard Ramon of Rosanes; Ermengol IV of Urgell; Bernard, Count of Cerdanya	Muhammad ibn al-Hajj †; Muhammad ibn Aisha (DOW)

The Battle of Martorell was fought in 1114 between the Almoravids and a coalition of the Christian counties of Barcelona, Urgell and Cerdanya led by Ramon Berenguer III.

== Background ==
Once freed from the presence of El Cid in Valencia, the Almoravids were able to begin campaigns towards the Kingdom of Aragon and the Catalan counties. In 1114, Muhammad ibn Aisha and Muhammad ibn al-Hajj, governors of Zaragoza and Valencia, respectively, led an army from Valencia through Lleida via Seo de Urgel and Segarra to the plain of Barcelona. They then attacked Bages causing substantial damage to the Monastery of Sant Benet de Bages.

Concurrently, the Almoravids of the Balearic Islands landed at the mouth of the Besòs River attacked Barcelona and destroyed Sant Adrià de Besòs and Sant Andreu de Palomar.

== Battle ==
As the Almoravids were returning to their kingdoms laden with booty, they were attacked in an ambush near Martorell by the combined armies of Barcelona, Urgell and Cerdanya led by Ramon Berenguer III. Also participating in the battle were the Christian forces from the fortress at Martorell which had been previously evacuated by Udalard Ramon de Rosanes during the Almoravids northern march.

Al-Hajj and most of his army were killed. The remainer of the Almoravids were pursued down the coast of Salou. Although ibn Aisha managed to escape, he was seriously injured and died shortly thereafter.

== Citations ==
- Cuadernos de arqueología e historia de la ciudad. Museo de Historia de la Ciudad. 1964.
- Ferrer i Mallol, M. Teresa; Riu i Riu, Manuel (31 August 2018). Tractats i negociacions diplomàtiques de Catalunya i de la Corona catalanoaragonesa a l'edat mitjana: 1.2. Tractats i negociacions diplomàtiques amb els regnes peninsulars i l'Àndalus (Segle XI-1213) (in Catalan). Institut d'Estudis Catalans. ISBN 978-84-9965-418-8.
- Font i Rius, Josep Maria (1983). Cartas de población y franquicia de Cataluña (in Spanish). Editorial CSIC - CSIC Press. ISBN 978-84-00-05316-1.
- "La història: El predomini del comtat barceloní". Enciclopèdia.cat (in Catalan).
- Manjunath.R (3 July 2021). Timelines of Nearly Everything.
- "Martorell". Enciclopèdia.cat (in Catalan). Archived from the original on 23 September 2010.
- "Muhammad ibn Aisa". Europa Romanica (in Catalan).
- Pagès i Paretas, Montserrat (1992). Art romànic i feudalisme al Baix Llobregat (in Catalan). Publicacions de la Abadia de Monserrat. ISBN 978-84-7826-300-4.
- Pladevall, Antoni (1970). eLS monestirs catalans (in Catalan).
- Sanjuán, Alejandro García (2022). "Muhammad b. 'A'isa". Real Academia de la Historia (in Spanish).
- Ubieto Arteta, Antonio. Creación y desarrollo de la Corona de Aragón. Zaragoza: Anúbar (Historia de Aragón), 1987. ISBN 84-7013-227-X.

== General References ==
- Cervera Fras, M ª José, (1999), El reino de Saraqusta, Zaragoza: CAI, ISBN 84-88305-93-1
- Corral, José Luis, (1998), Historia de Zaragoza. Zaragoza musulmana (714-1118), Zaragoza: Ayto. de Zaragoza y CAI, ISBN 84-8069-155-7
- Guichard, Pierre; Soravia, Bruna; (2005), Los reinos de taifas : fragmentación política y esplendor cultural, Málaga: Editorial Sarriá, ISBN 84-95129-92-2
- Huici Miranda, Ambrosio, (2000), Las grandes batallas de la reconquista durante las invasiones africanas, Granada: Editorial Universidad de Granada, ISBN 84-338-2659-X
- Sobrequés, Santiago (1985), Els Grans Comtes de Barcelona, Barcelona: Vicens-Vives, Edition 4ª, ISBN 84-316-1805-1
- Villacañas Berlanga, José Luis (2006), La formación de los reinos Hispánicos, Espasa-Calpe, ISBN 84-670-2257-4
