= Siege of Barcelona =

Siege of Barcelona may refer to:

- Siege of Barcelona (801), during the Reconquista
- Siege of Barcelona (827), during the Reconquista
- Siege of Barcelona (1115), during the Almoravid expansion
- Siege of Barcelona (1462), during the Catalan Civil War
- Siege of Barcelona (1472), during the Catalan Civil War
- Siege of Barcelona (1651), during the Catalan Revolt
- Siege of Barcelona (1697), during the Nine Years' War
- Siege of Barcelona (1705), during the War of the Spanish Succession
- Siege of Barcelona (1706), during the War of the Spanish Succession
- Siege of Barcelona (1713–1714), during the War of the Spanish Succession
- Siege of Barcelona (1808), during the Peninsular War

== See also ==
- The Surrender of Barcelona (1934–1937), a painting by Wyndham Lewis
- Battle of Barcelona
