= Almoravid expedition to Catalonia (1114) =

1114 military expedition during the Reconquista

- Part of the Reconquista
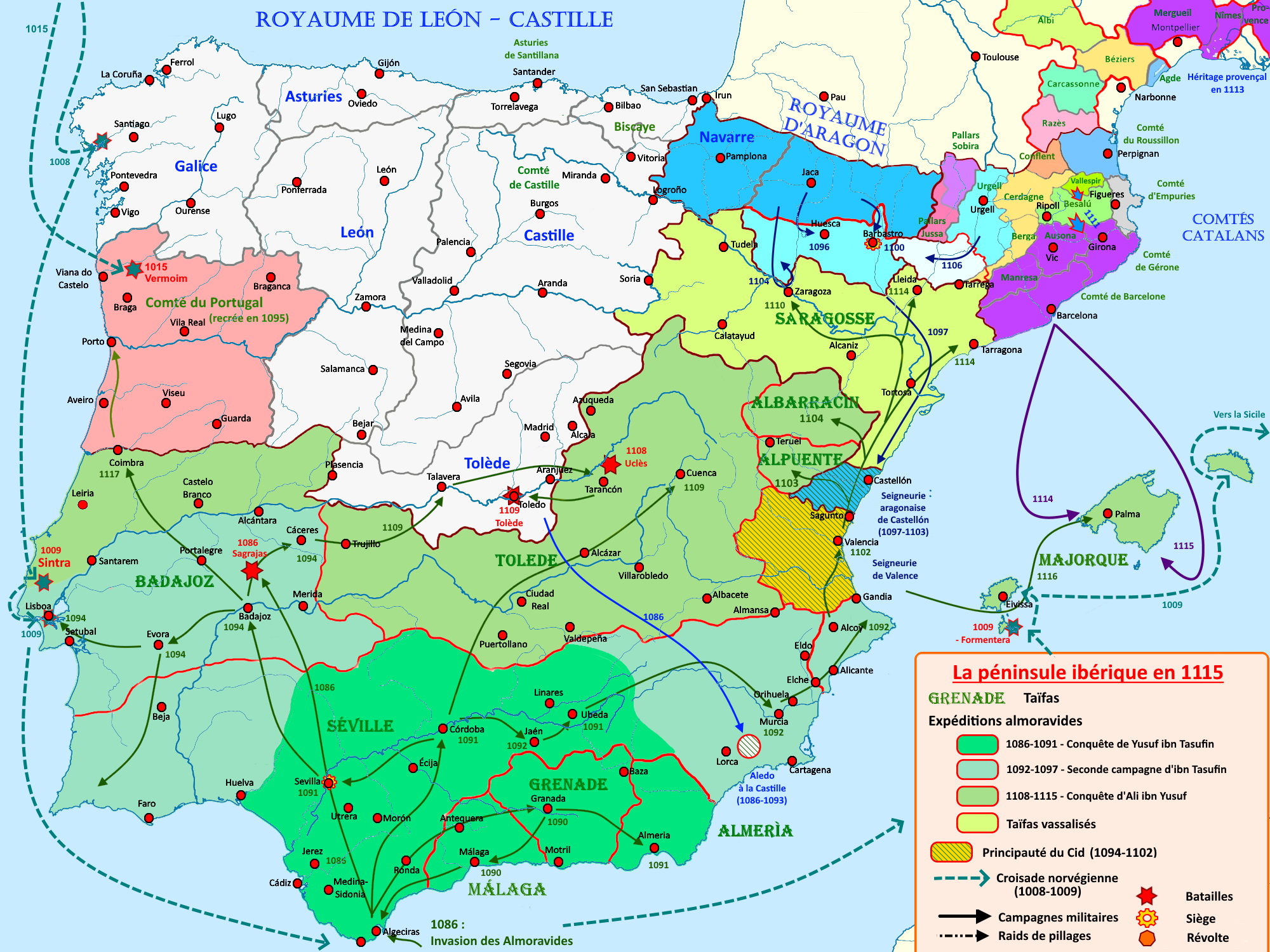
- Map of the Iberian Peninsula in 1115
Date	1114
Location	Catalan counties
Result	Catalan victory

Belligerents
County of Barcelona; County of Urgell; County of Cerdanya	Almoravid dynasty

Commanders and leaders
Ramon Berenguer III of Barcelona; Ermengol IV of Urgell; Bernard I of Cerdanya	Muhammad ibn al-Hajj †; Muhammad ibn Aisha (DOW)

Strength
Unknown	Unknown

Casualties and losses
High	High

In 1114, the governors of the taifa kingdoms of Zaragoza and Valencia, Muhammad ibn al-Hajj and Muhammad ibn Aisha, respectively, led a raid into the Catalan counties and ravaged the territory. As the raiders were returning to their kingdoms, however, they were surprised in an ambush and defeated in battle by the armies of the Catalan counties of Barcelona, Urgell and Cerdanya.

== Background ==
Following the fall of Valencia in 1102, the Almoravids began to expand into the Upper March. In 1110, the Almoravids conquered Zaragoza, the last remaining taifa in the Iberian Peninsula.

Three years later in 1113, the Catalan counties along with the Republic of Pisa and the County of Provence invaded the Balearic Islands. Realizing that a large part of the armies of the Catalan counties were on expedition in the Mediterranean Sea, al-Hajj and ibn Aisha invaded the Catalan counties.

== Expedition ==
At the outset, the Almoravid forces drove through Lleida, the Pla d'Urgell and Segarra. Next they attacked Bages causing substantial damage to the Monastery of Sant Benet de Bages. In addition, a separate Almoravid army from the Balearic Islands landed at the mouth of the Besòs River and attacked Sant Adrià de Besòs and Sant Andreu de Palomar.

As the Almoravids were returning to their kingdoms laden with booty, however, they were ambushed in a ravine near Martorell by the combined armies of Barcelona, Urgell and Cerdanya. Al-Hajj and most of his army were killed. The remainer of the Almoravids were pursued down the coast of Salou. Although ibn Aisha managed to escape, he was seriously injured and died shortly thereafter.

== Aftermath ==
One year later in 1115, the Almoravids laid siege to Barcelona. After 20 days, however, Catalan reinforcements commanded by Ramon Berenguer III arrived and forced the Almoravids to end the siege. That same year, the Christians managed to conquer the Balearic Islands only to lose the islands back to the Almoravids some months later.

== Citations ==
- Catlos, Brian A. (20 March 2014). Muslims of Medieval Latin Christendom, c.1050–1614. Cambridge University Press. ISBN 978-0-521-88939-1.
- Cuadernos de arqueología e historia de la Ciudad (in Spanish). Seminario de Investigación. 1964.
- Curta, Florin (28 November 2016). Great Events in Religion: An Encyclopedia of Pivotal Events in Religious History [3 volumes]. Bloomsbury Publishing USA. ISBN 978-1-61069-566-4.
- Ellis, Steven (2002). Empires and States in European Perspective. Edizioni Plus, Università di Pisa. ISBN 978-88-8492-046-1.
- Ferrer i Mallol, M. Teresa; Riu i Riu, Manuel (31 August 2018). Tractats i negociacions diplomàtiques de Catalunya i de la Corona catalanoaragonesa a l'edat mitjana: 1.2. Tractats i negociacions diplomàtiques amb els regnes peninsulars i l'Àndalus (Segle XI-1213) (in Catalan). Institut d'Estudis Catalans. ISBN 978-84-9965-418-8.
- Findlay, Ronald; Lundahl, Mats (16 November 2016). The Economics of the Frontier: Conquest and Settlement. Springer. ISBN 978-1-137-60237-4.
- Font i Rius, Josep Maria (1983). Cartas de población y franquicia de Cataluña (in Spanish). Editorial CSIC - CSIC Press. ISBN 978-84-00-05316-1.
- Guichard, Pierre (2001). Al-Andalus frente a la conquista cristiana: Los musulmanes de Valencia, siglos XI-XIII (in Spanish). Universitat de València. ISBN 978-84-7030-852-9.
- Lomax, Derek W. (1978). The Reconquest of Spain. Longman. ISBN 978-0-582-50209-3.
- Manjunath.R (3 July 2021). Timelines of Nearly Everything.
- Pladevall, Antoni (1970). eLS monestirs catalans (in Catalan).
- Sanjuán, Alejandro García (2022). "Muhammad b. 'A'isa". Real Academia de la Historia (in Spanish).
- Steinberg, S. H. (20 October 1986). Historical Tables: 58 BC–AD 1985. Springer. ISBN 978-1-349-08585-9.
- Syed, Muzaffar Husain; Akhtar, Syed Saud; Usmani, B. D. (14 September 2011). Concise History of Islam. Vij Books India Pvt. ISBN 978-93-82573-47-0.

== General References ==
- Doxey, Gary b.(1996), Norwegian Crusaders and the Balearic Islands, University of Illinois Press
