= Rawd al-Qirtas =

Maghreb history book

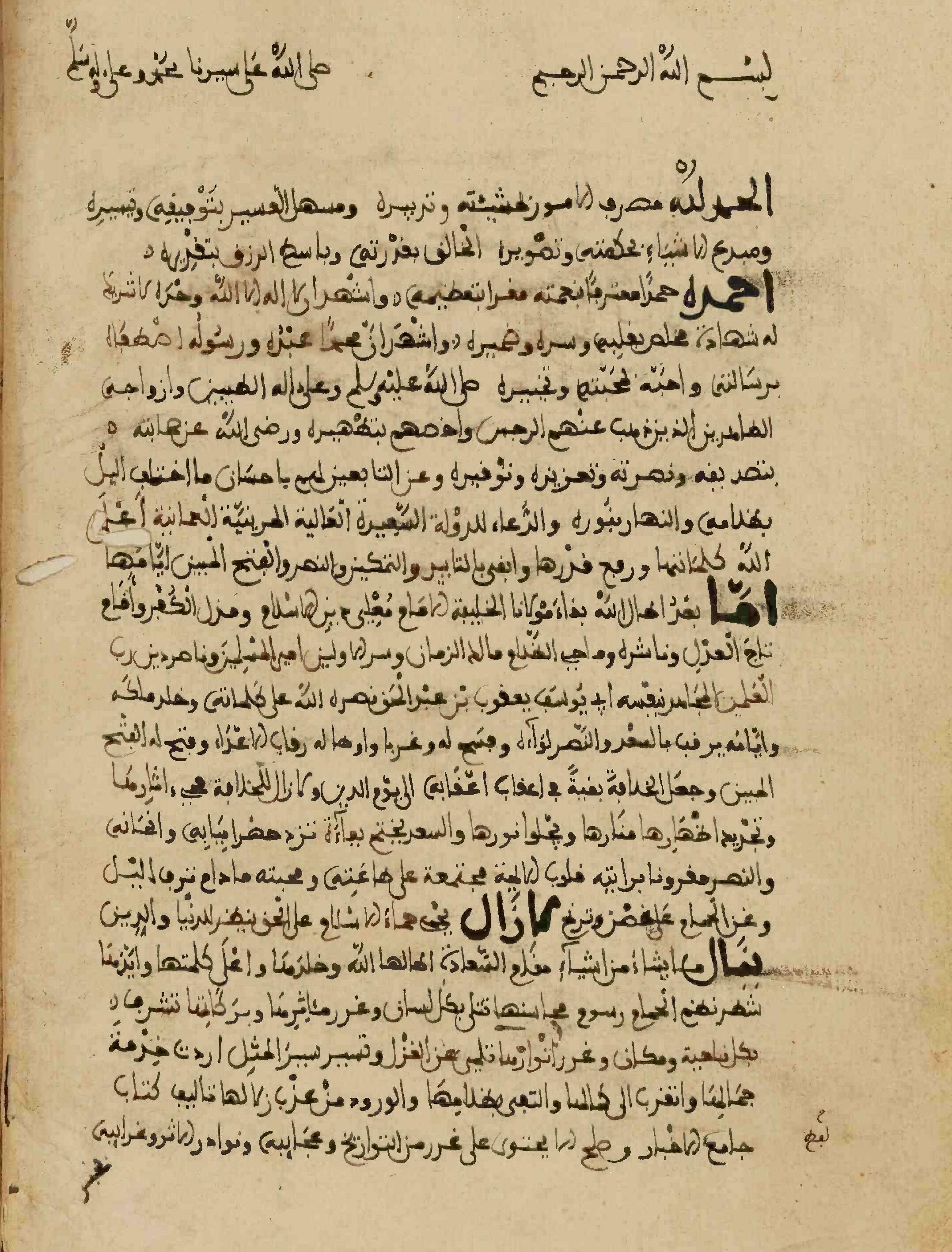
First page of a manuscript of Rawḍ al-Qirṭās.

Rawḍ al-Qirṭās (Arabic: روض القرطاس) short for Kitāb al-ānīs al-muṭrib bi-rawḍ al-qirṭās fī ākhbār mulūk al-maghrab wa tārīkh madīnah Fās (الأنيس المطرب بروض القرطاس في أخبار ملوك المغرب وتاريخ مدينة فاس, The Entertaining Companion Book in the Gardens of Pages from the Chronicle of the Kings of the Maghreb and the History of the City of Fes) is a 14th-century book that describes the rulers of the Maghreb, and a local history of the city of Fez.

The work is usually known by its short title Rawd al-Qirtas meaning The Gardens of Pages. It is said that this has a double meaning in that there was a public garden in Fes called The Garden of al-Qirtas, the latter name being a nickname of Ziri ibn Atiyya.

In the days before printing, this popularity led to a large number of variant manuscripts. A consequence of this is some uncertainty about the author, who is given in some versions as Ibn Abi Zar of Fes, and by some as Salih ibn Abd al-Halim of Granada. The consensus of modern opinion is that the original author is Ibn Abi Zar as stated by Ibn Khaldun, and that Abd al-Halim is merely a summarizer at best. The double meaning of the title, the detailed history of Fes and numerous mistakes in the geography of Iberia, are cited as evidence that the author was a native of Fes.

The scope of the history is from the advent of Idris I in 788 to the Marinid Dynasty up to 1326. The work falls into four sections, each ending in a summary list of the events in each period:

- The Idrisid and Maghrawa kings
- The Almoravids
- The Almohads
- The Marinids

Modern researchers consider that the first and last sections contain a valuable record of their respective periods, even if not completely free from errors. On the other hand, the sections on the Almoravids and Almohads are considered to be riddled with chronological and factual errors and omissions and make this work one of the least trustworthy sources for those periods.

The 16th century manuscript upon which Tornberg's 19th century critical edition and translation are based.

A critical version of the Arabic text, utilizing all the manuscript versions then available, was published by Tornberg in 1843, and this is generally used as a basis for modern Arabic versions. Tornberg also gave a Latin translation. A French translation was published in 1860 by Beaumier but is based on fewer manuscripts and is considered faulty by modern standards. The second (1964) edition of Huici Miranda's Spanish translation is heavily annotated and is considered authoritative.
