= Monastery of Sant Benet de Bages =

Former Benedictine monastery in Catalonia, Spain

Coordinates: 41.743°N 1.899°E

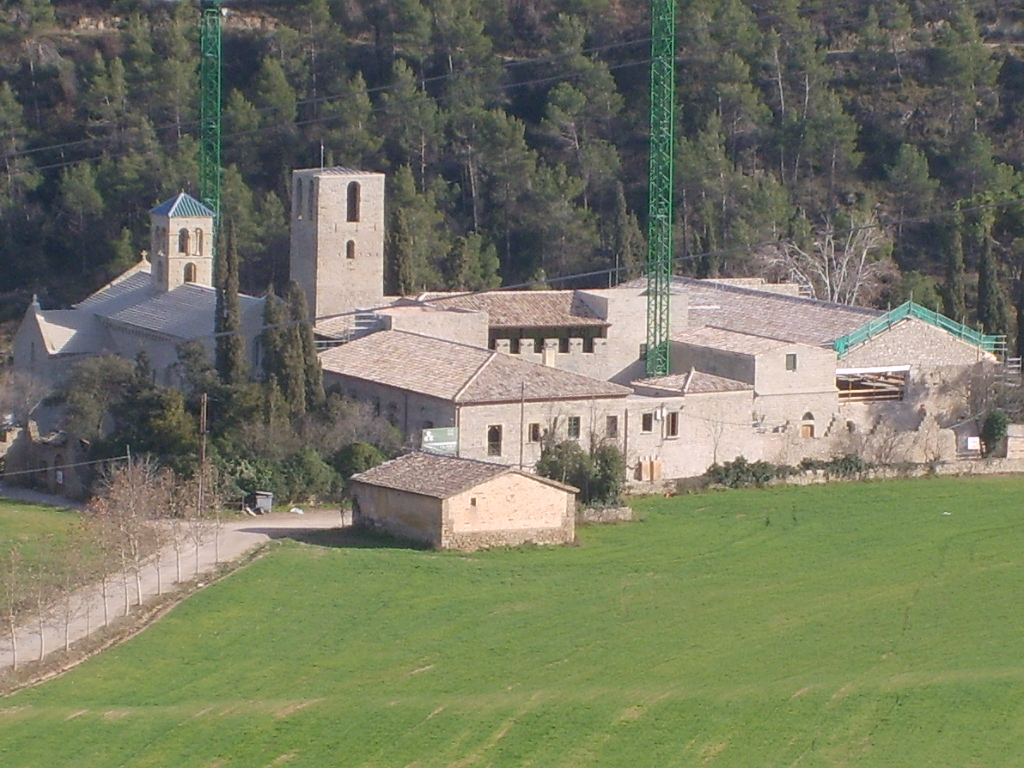
The monastery of Sant Benet de Bages as it has been restored by Josep Puig i Cadafalch.

The Monastery of Sant Benet de Bages is a former Benedictine monastery, in the comarca of Bages, Barcelona, Catalonia, Spain. The Romanesque monastery was thoroughly restored at the beginning of the twentieth century by the Catalan architect Josep Puig i Cadafalch.

== History ==
The monastery was founded about 950 by the noble Salla and his consort Ricarda, of the house of the viscounts of Osona. According to the founding legend, Salla traveled to Rome to have his institution authorized, and to have it depend directly on the Holy See, the usual method for preserving the community from interference from the bishop— in this case of Vic— in whose diocese it lay. The abbey church was consecrated 3 December 972, witnessed by a gathering of notables: Borrell II, Count of Barcelona, the bishops Frugifer of Vic, Guisad of Urgell and Pere of Barcelona, the viscount Guadald of Osona, and three of the four offspring of the recently deceased founder, his son Isarn and the sisters Quíxol and Ego, at the head of witnesses both laymen and priests, in a grand ceremonial recorded in the surviving act of consecration.

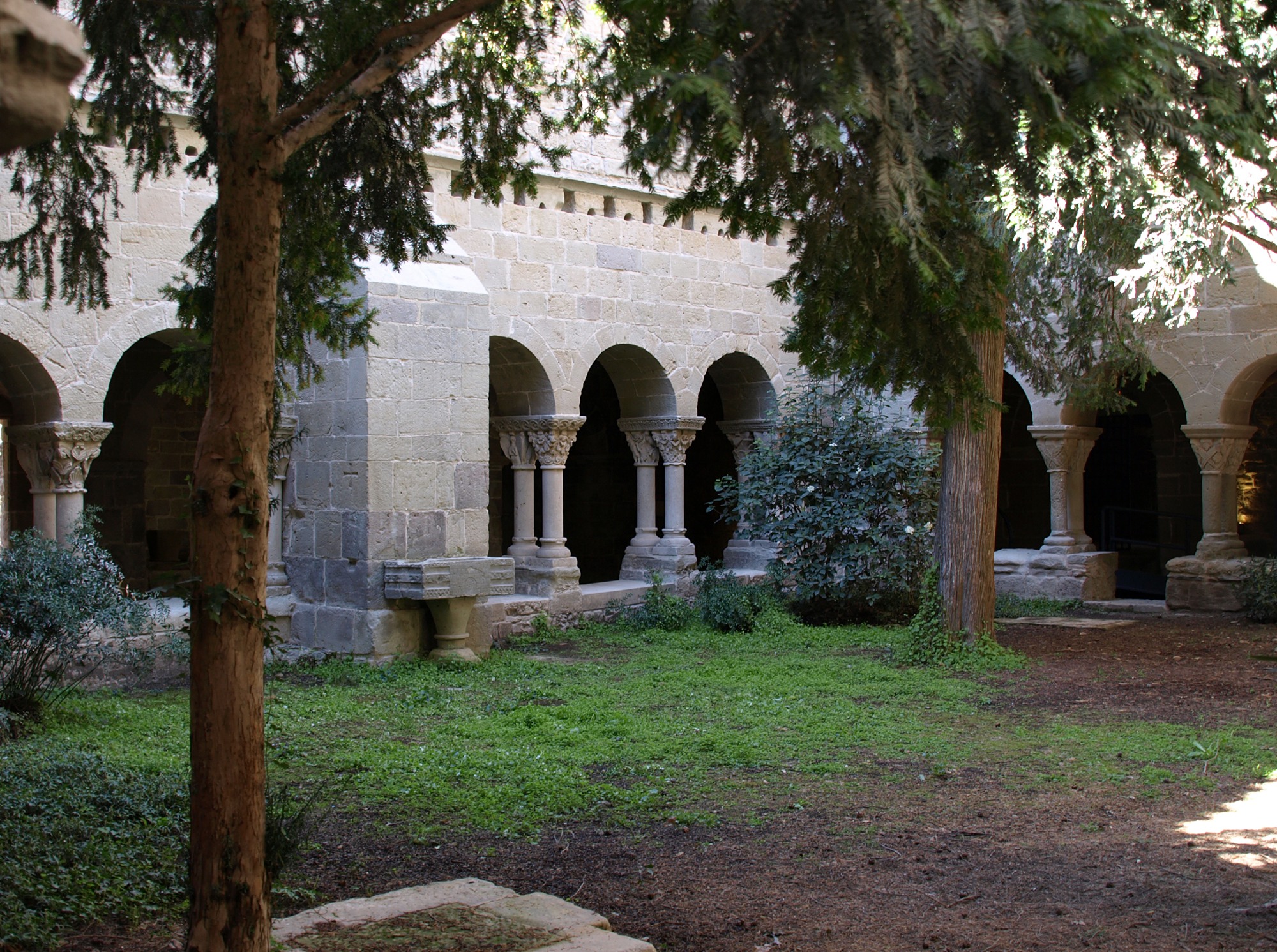
The cloister

The community was dedicated to the Holy Trinity and to Benedict of Nursia (Sant Benet in Catalan), founder of the order, and Peter and Andrew, all guarantors of its future orthodoxy. The founder secured dispensations that the future abbots would be chosen from among their descendants, making the abbey a form of proprietary church, an agreement that would soon lead to disputes among the various branches of their lineage as to choice of abbots.

From 965, the abbey church held the supposed relics of Saint Valentine, enclosed in a wooden reliquary with plates of silver depicting miracles of Saint Valentine, which was rediscovered in 1863 in the church of Navarcles.

At the beginning of the eleventh century the monastery passed under the direction of the Abbey of Saint Peter of Tomeras at Narbonne, from which the community freed itself in 1108. In 1125 Sant Benet de Bages suffered from an attack by moors that required a rebuilding, financed by local nobles who required in return the right to be buried in its consecrated ground.

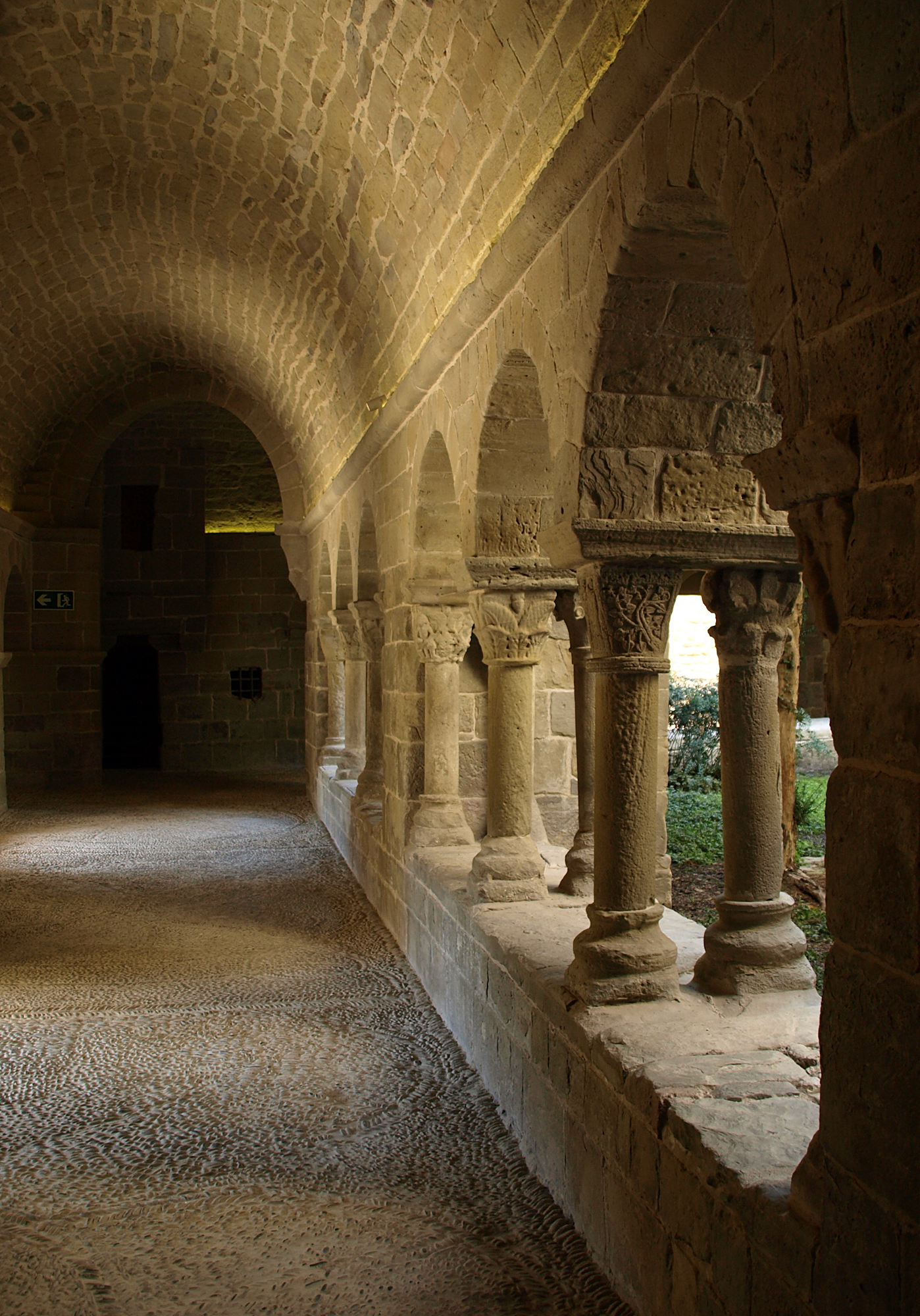
In the cloister

The most splendid age of Sant Benet de Bages was in the fourteenth century, until the Black Death left the community with only two survivors, in a period that witnessed the beginning of its decline. On 9 November 1593, by order of Pope Clement VIII the community passed under the direction of the Abbey of Montserrat, and remained so until it was suppressed in 1820, serving as a place of retirement for Montserrat's community of monks. By the "law of desamortización" of 1835, all religious orders in Spain were required to render up their possessions.

The crumbling ancient structure attracted the interest of intellectuals who organised visits to it in the late nineteenth century. The architect Puig i Cadafalch and the painter Ramon Casas encouraged the mother of Casas to buy the property in 1907; in 1910 it passed into the hands of Casas, who commissioned Puig i Cadafalch to restore it. Since 2000, when it was purchased from Casas' heirs it has belonged to Caixa Manresa (now CatalunyaCaixa), a financial institution that has undertaken its maintenance.
