= Ibn Abi Zar =

14th-century Maghrebi historian and author

- ابن أبي زرع
- Born: Abū al-Ḥasan ʿAlī ibn Abī Zarʿ al-Fāsī; Fez, in present-day Morocco
- Died: Between 1310 and 1320; Fez, in present-day Morocco
- Occupation: Historian
- Employer: Marinid Sultan Abu Sa'id Uthman II

Academic work
- Notable works: Rawd al-Qirtas (The Garden of Pages)

Abū al-Ḥasan ʿAlī ibn Abī Zarʿ al-Fāsī (Arabic: أبو الحسن علي بن أبي زرع الفاسي) (d. between 1310 and 1320) is the commonly presumed original author of the popular and influential medieval history of the Maghreb known as Rawd al-Qirtas, said to have been written at the instigation of Marinid Sultan Abu Sa'id Uthman II.

His full nasab is sometimes given as ibn Abd Allah ibn Abi Zar and sometimes as ibn Muhammad ibn Ahmad ibn Umar ibn Abi Zar. The uncertainty about his name and authorship of the Rawd is caused by the many variant manuscripts in circulation since the Middle Ages. Very little is known about his life except that he was evidently a scholar at Fes.

== See also ==
- Rawd al-Qirtas
