= Ostuni Cathedral =

Coordinates: 40.7310°N 17.5774°E

- Duomo di Ostuni; Basilica concattedrale di Santa Maria Assunta
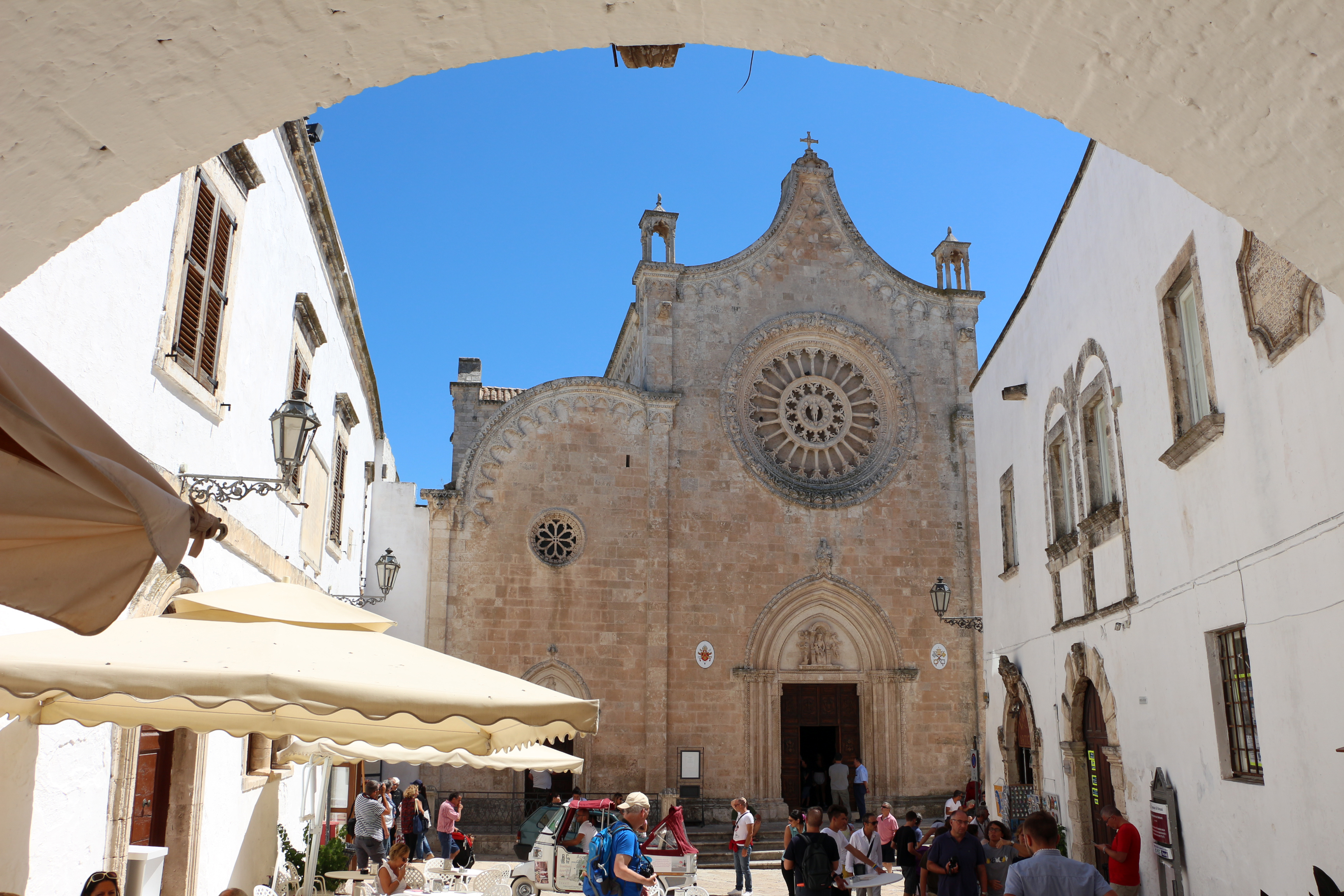
- West front
- Ostuni Cathedral
- Location: Ostuni
- Country: Italy
- Denomination: Roman Catholic
- Previous denomination: Orthodox

History
- Status: minor basilica
- Founded: 1000

Architecture
- Architectural type: Romanesque, rebuilt Gothic
- Years built: 1228-1229

Specifications
- Materials: Pietra gentile

Administration
- Archdiocese: Archdiocese of Brindisi-Ostuni

Ostuni Cathedral (Italian: Duomo di Ostuni; Basilica concattedrale di Santa Maria Assunta) is a Roman Catholic cathedral in Ostuni, province of Brindisi, region of Apulia, Italy. The dedication is to the Assumption of the Virgin Mary. Formerly the episcopal seat of the Diocese of Ostuni, it has been since 1986 a co-cathedral of the Archdiocese of Brindisi-Ostuni.

== History ==
The cathedral was originally a church practising Orthodox rites prior to the year 1000. In 1228-1229, the present Romanesque church was erected by Frederick II of Swabia. It is built mostly of the easily-carved and delicately-coloured local calcarenite limestone known as pietra gentile. It sustained considerable damage in the earthquake of 1456 (felt strongly in Brindisi), following which, it was again rebuilt - this time in the Gothic style - between 1469 and 1495.

The façade acquired its elegant rose window in the 15th century. The church once had four such windows. One of the portals is dedicated to Saint Blaise (San Biagio), one of the patrons of the city, and has the saint carved on the portal. A restoration carried out in the 1970s focused on the removal of later stucco decorations which were obscuring noteworthy features of the original Romanesque and Gothic architecture.

The interior has a number of artworks covering the ceiling and altars. The Chapel of the Sacred Heart, once of St Cajetan (Gaetano) had a canvas of the saint attributed to Domenico Antonio Vaccaro. The Cappellone dell'Immacolata was decorated in the 18th century. The sacristy has a large venerated icon depicting Saint Oronzo. One Chapel is dedicated to the patron saints of Ostuni: Saint Blaise, Saint Augustine, Saint Orontius, and Saint Irene. The church once had a canvas, now stolen, of Santa Lucia by Palma il Giovane. The apse has an altarpiece of the Assunta, and the chapel of Santa Maria della Sanità has a fresco depicting Saint Catherine of Alexandria. A niche of the counter-facade has a 15th-century statue of Christ.

The cathedral archives hold nearly 200 parchments dating back to the 12th century.

The building was declared a National Monument in 1902. In 1986 it became a co-cathedral of the Archdiocese of Brindisi-Ostuni. Restoration work was carried out between 2006 and 2007 and in 2011 the Cathedral was granted the status of a minor basilica.

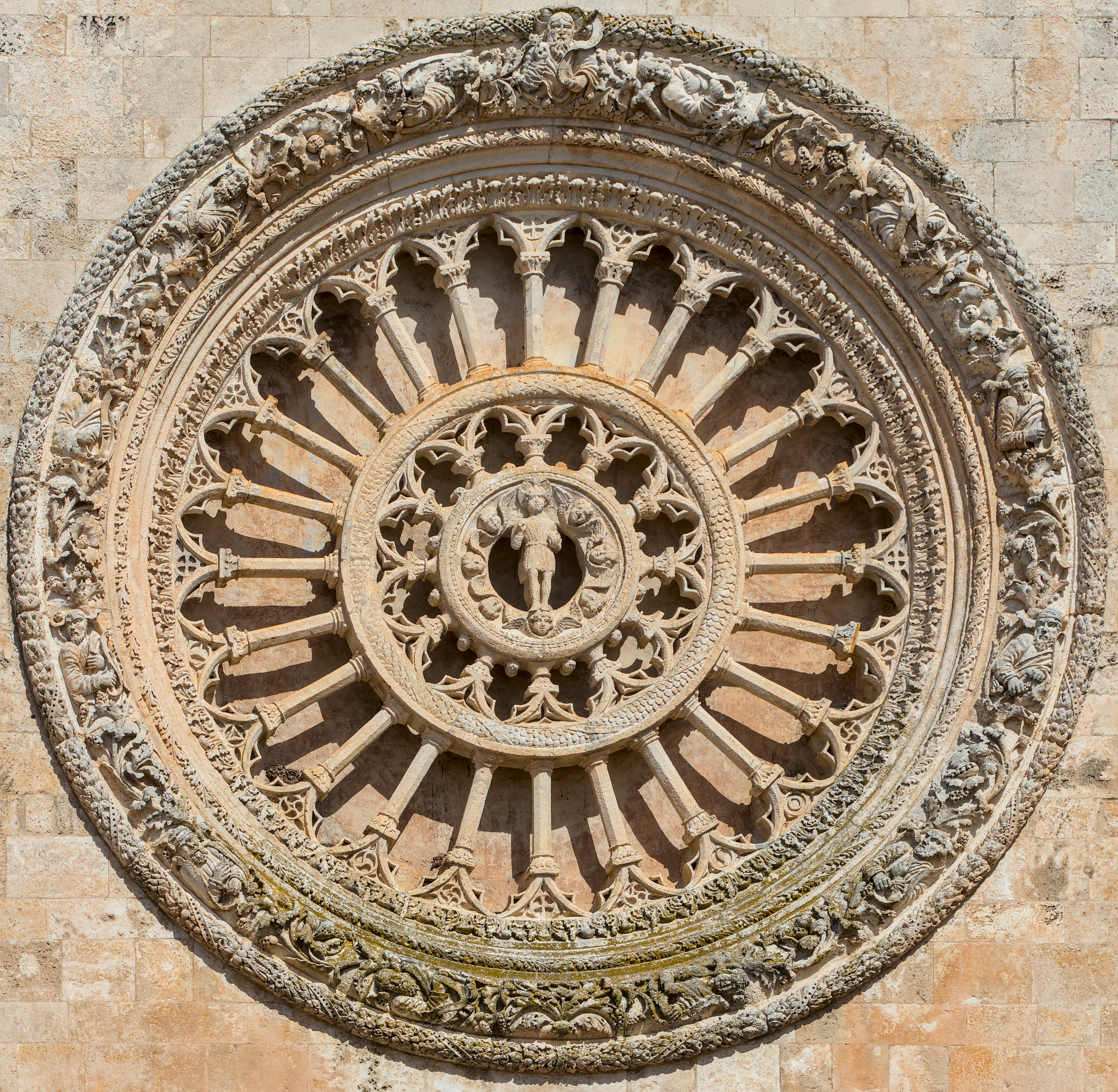
The rose window

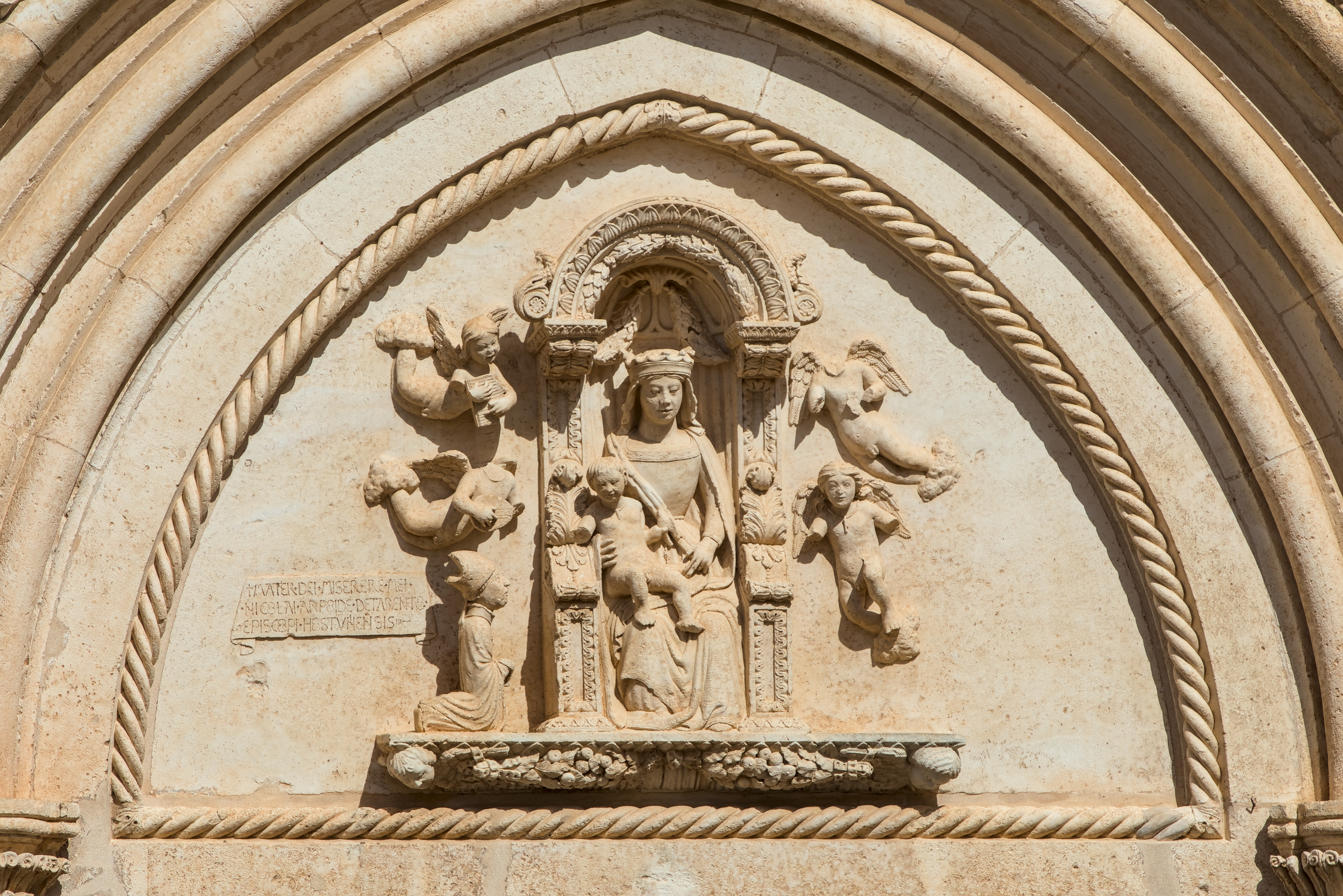
Tympanum of the main portal : Madonna with Child in glory

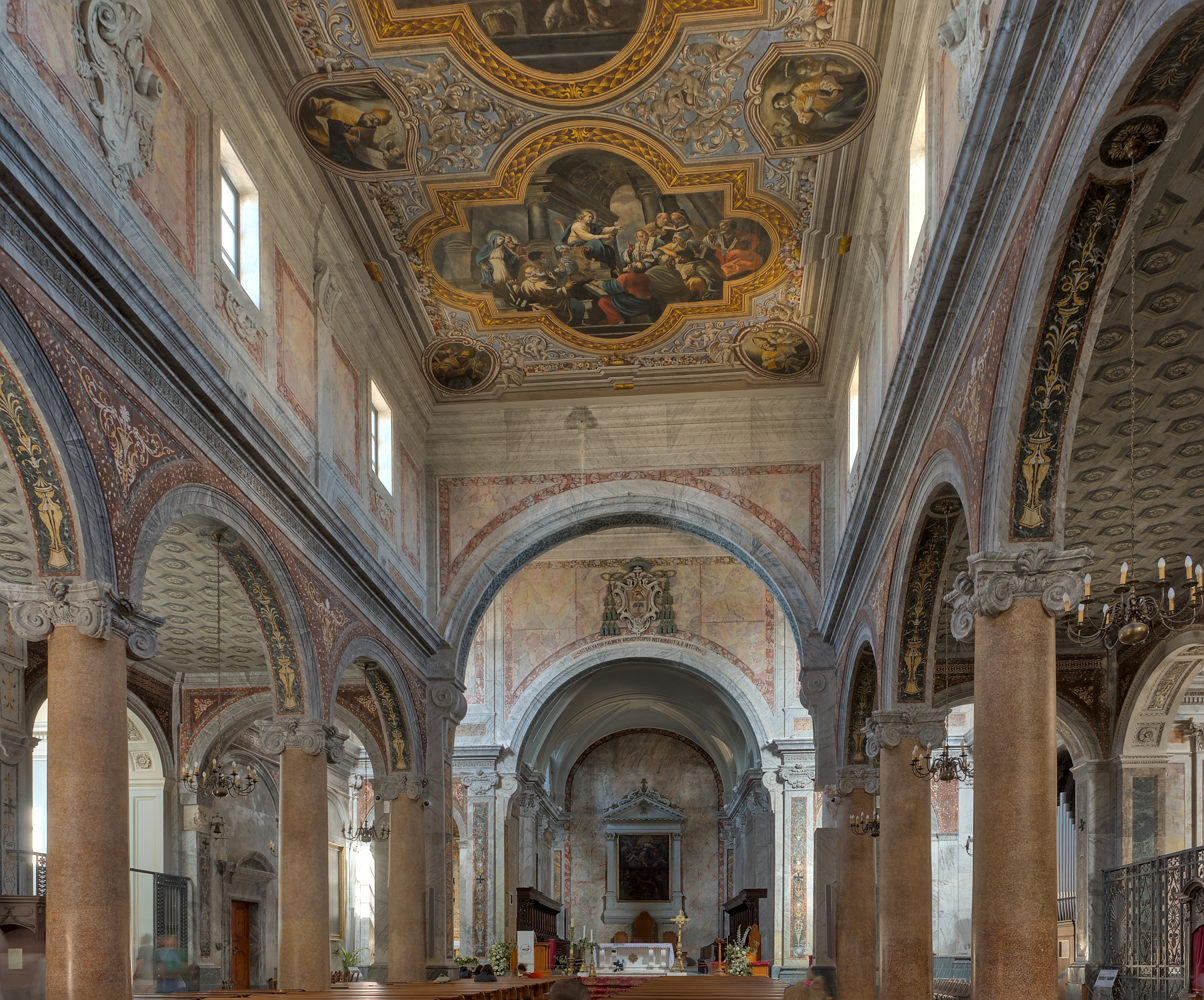
The interior

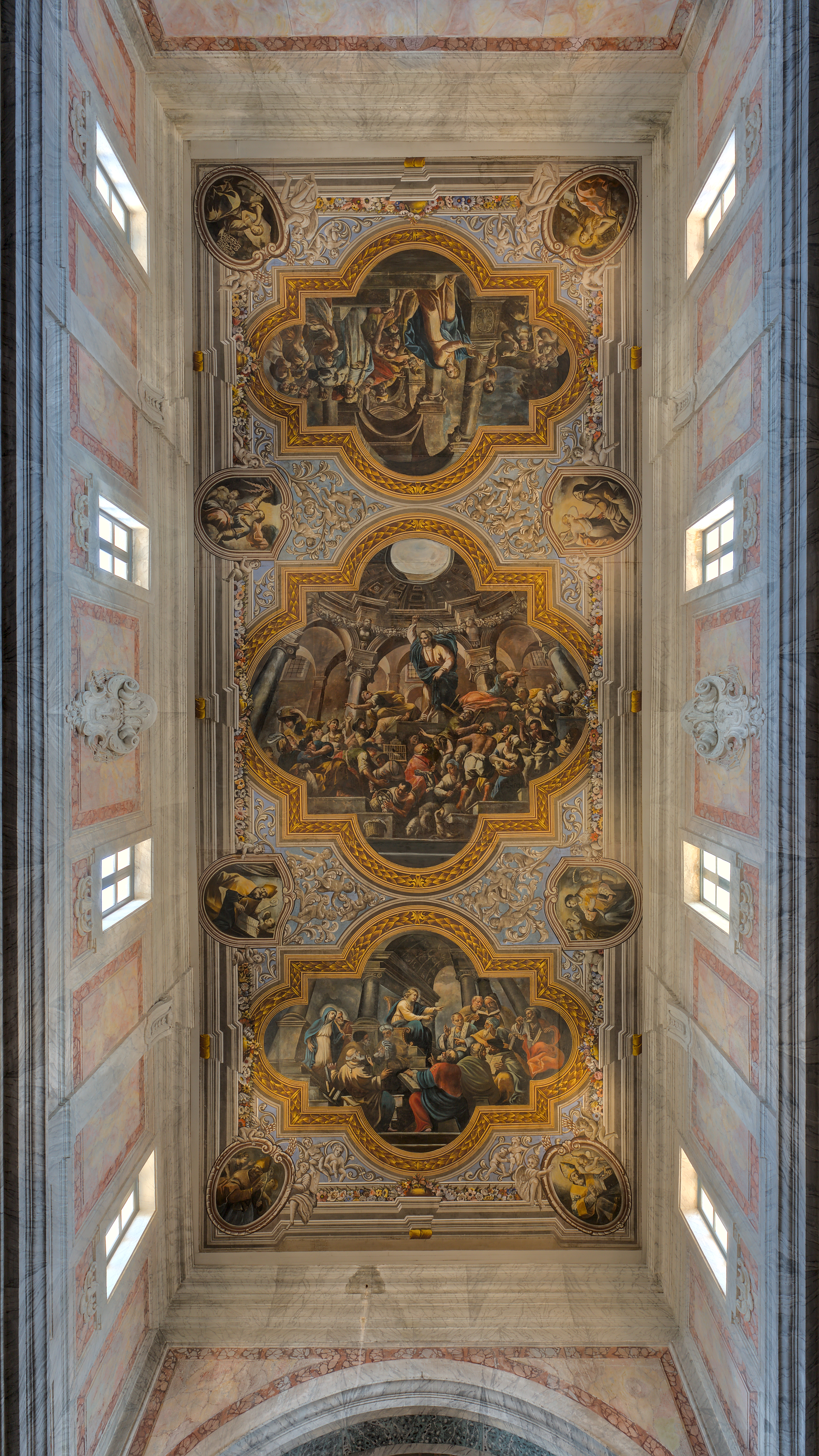
Frescoes on the nave ceiling (18th c.)

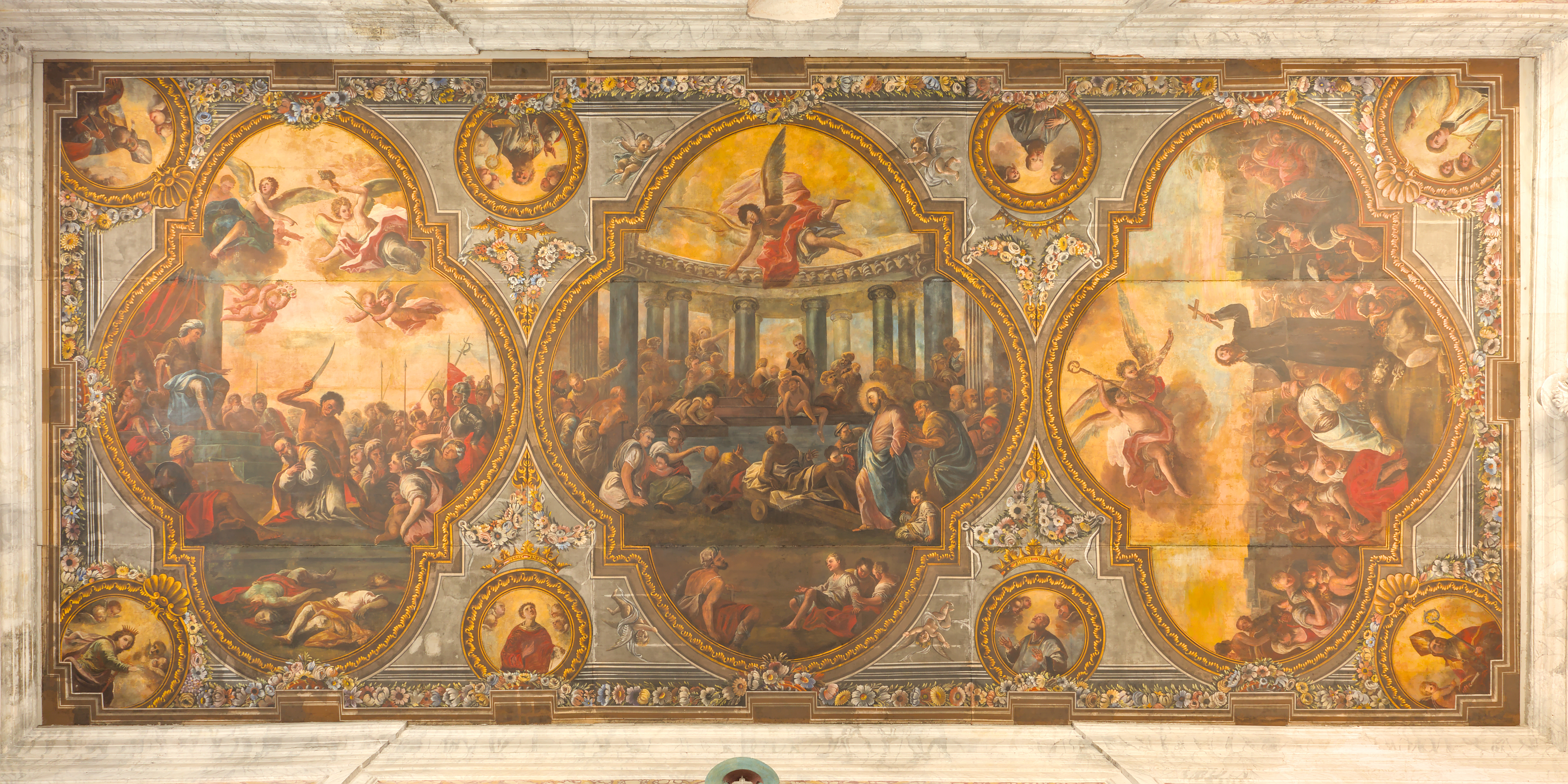
Frescoes on the crossing ceiling (18th c.)
