= Pumo =

Ceramic figurine

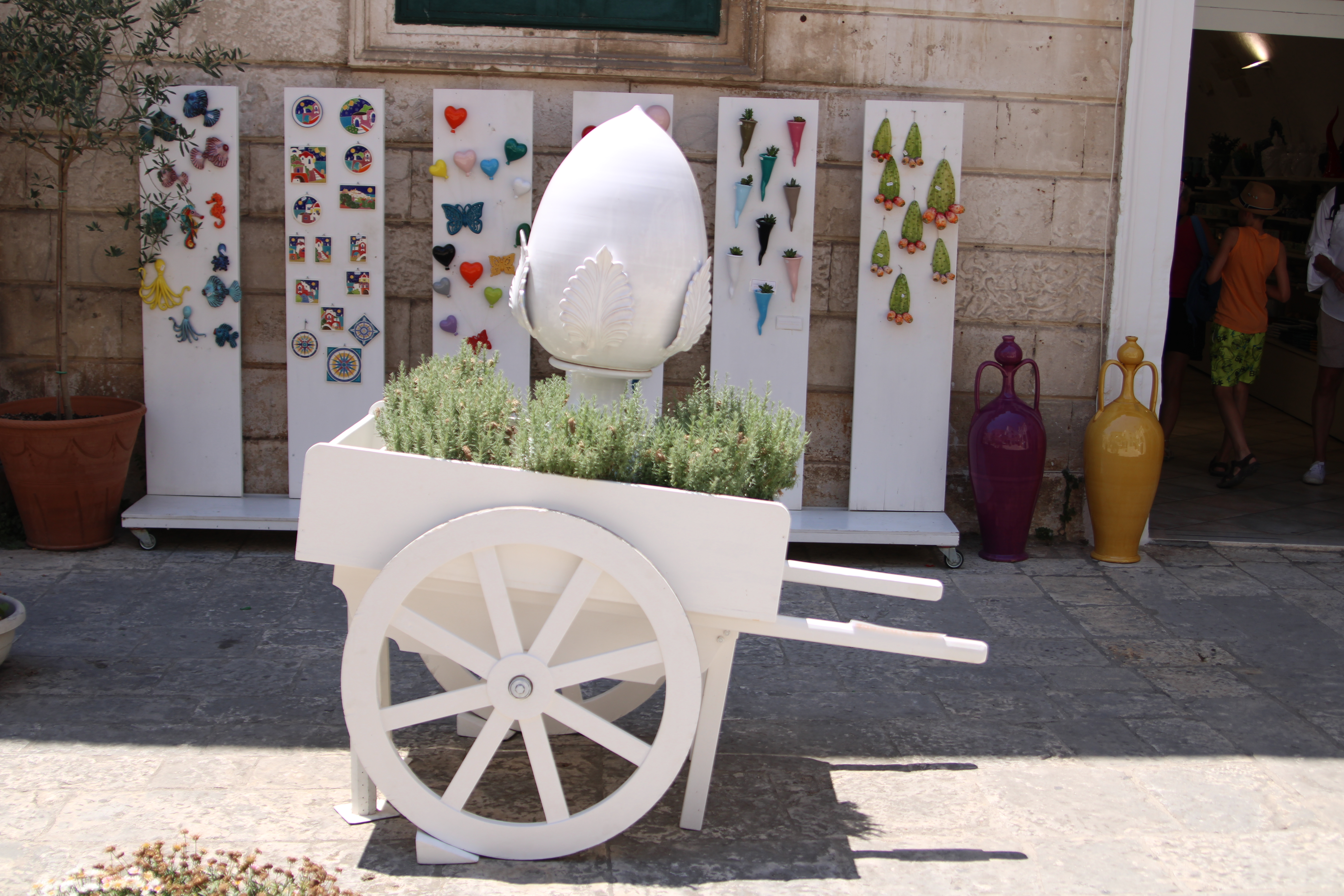
Pumo as a decorative element on a street in Ostuni

Pumo (plural, pumi) is a traditional ceramic figurine from the Apulia region of Italy, known for its symbolic and artistic qualities. It depicts a stylized flower bud surrounded by three acanthus leaves.

== History ==
The pumo originates from the Greco-Roman tradition, from which the region has drawn its ceramic heritage since antiquity. The name pumo derives from the Latin word pomum ("fruit") and is associated with the cult of Pomona – the Roman goddess of fruit, symbolizing fertility and abundance. Originally, it adorned palace cornices and the balconies of the wealthiest families, with the number and refinement of the pumi reflecting the owner's social status. They were regarded as amulets, protecting against the "evil eye" and bringing luck and prosperity.

== Symbolism and use ==
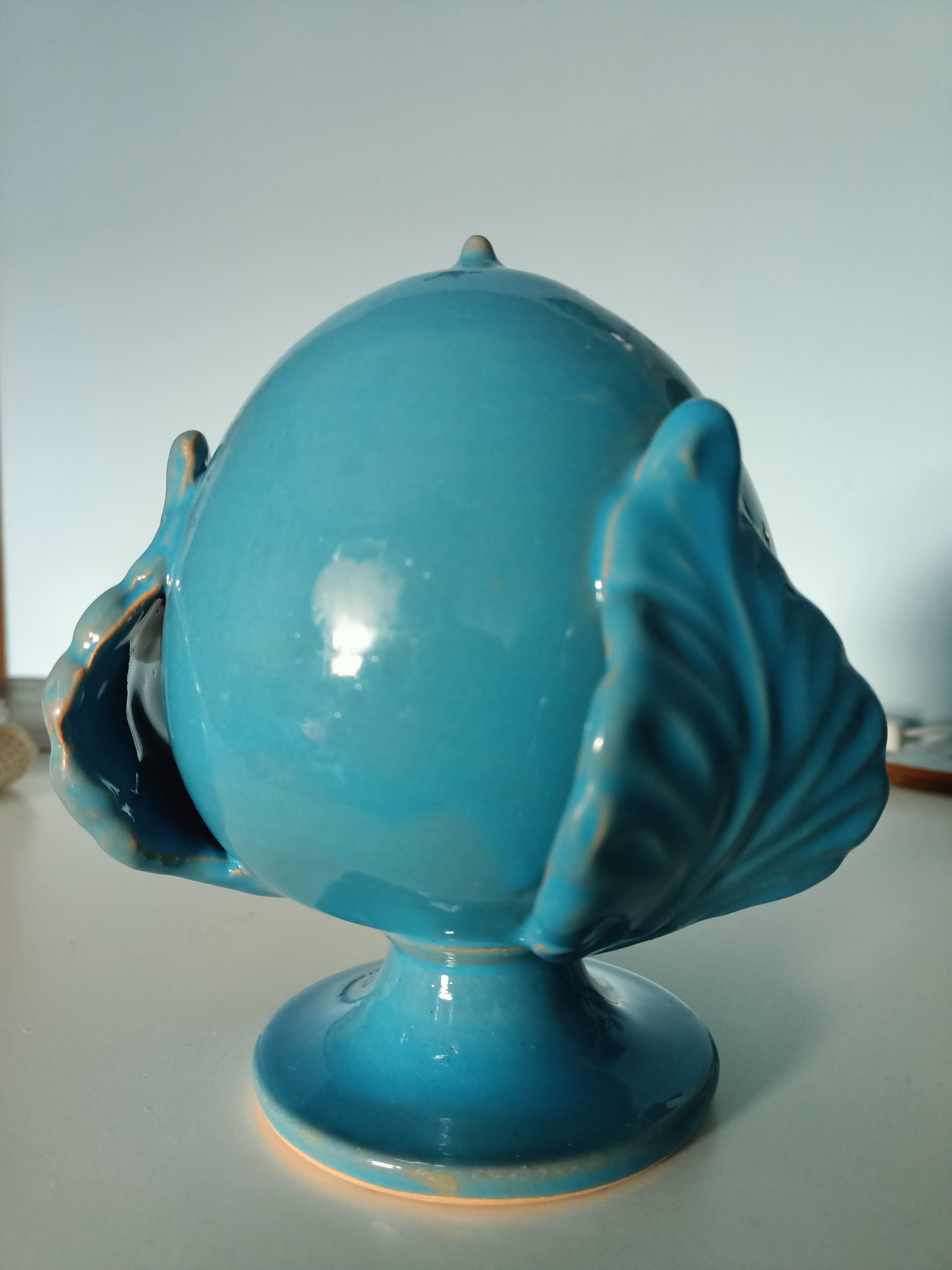
Blue pumo

The pumo exists today as a decorative talisman. It has become an informal ambassador of Apulian culture, gaining popularity beyond the region and even outside Italy. It is also valued by tourists as a gift symbolizing luck, renewal, and local tradition.

Traditional pumi are made of terracotta or ceramic and are often glazed in various colors (popular ones include white, green, blue, red, yellow, and brown), using hand-sculpting and relief techniques. Today, they are commonly found as:

- decorative elements placed on balconies, terraces, handrails, and windowsills;
- gifts intended to bring luck and prosperity at the start of a new journey — such as weddings, childbirths, or house and business openings
- table decorations, lamp ornaments, scent diffusers, or Christmas baubles.

The colors used in creating pumi carry specific symbolic meaningss:

- White: purity and light, spiritual cleanliness, and protection.
- Red: passion, love, and vitality; it can also signify strength and courage. It is associated with protection against evil spirits and family prosperity.
- Green: prosperity, growth, and health. It is linked to nature, fertility, and renewal.
- Blue: peace, protection, and hope. It brings harmony and serenity and is believed to ward off evil spirits.
- Natural clay (brown or beige): authenticity, simplicity, and connection to the land.
- Gold, ecru, or yellow: sunlight, joy, and positive energy. It can also signify wealth and abundance, bringing cheerfulness and vitality to the home.
