= Roman Catholic Diocese of Ostuni =

The Diocese of Ostuni (Latin: Dioecesis Ostunensis or Hostuniensis) was a Roman Catholic diocese located in the town of Ostuni in the province of Brindisi in the region of Apulia in southern Italy. The diocese was in existence by the mid-11th century. In 1818, the diocese was suppressed, and its ecclesiastical territory assigned to the Archdiocese of Brindisi. In 1821, the diocese was revived, but the archbishops of Brindisi were made its perpetual administrator. From 1980 to 1986, Brindisi and Ostuni were suffragans of the ecclesiastical province of Lecce. In 1986, the diocese of Ostuni was completely suppressed and united to the archdiocese of Brindisi.

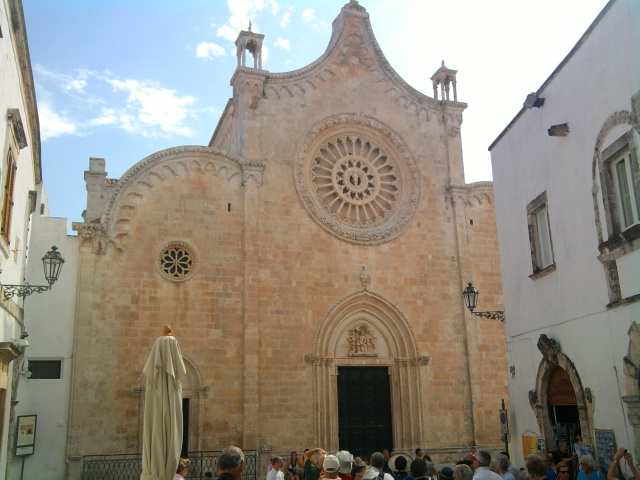
Cathedral of the Assumption, Ostuni

== History ==
A bishop of Ostuni in 596, named Melatius, is reported by Pius Bonifacius Gams. It has been shown by Francesco Lanzoni, however, that Melatius was a French bishop of "Rotumo", not a bishop of Ostuni.

From 1250 to 1258, Ostuni belonged to the principate of Taranto, under Manfred, the son of Frederick II, Holy Roman Emperor.

A diocesan synod was held in Ostuni by Bishop Giulio Cesare Carafa in 1586.

=== After the French ===
Following the extinction of the Napoleonic Kingdom of Italy, the Congress of Vienna authorized the restoration of the Papal States and the Kingdom of Naples. Since the French occupation had seen the abolition of many Church institutions in the Kingdom, as well as the confiscation of much Church property and resources, it was imperative that Pope Pius VII and King Ferdinand IV reach agreement on restoration and restitution. Ferdinand demanded the suppression of fifty dioceses.

A concordat was finally signed on 16 February 1818, and ratified by Pius VII on 25 February 1818. Ferdinand issued the concordat as a law on 21 March 1818. On 27 June 1818, Pius VII issued the bull De Ulteriore, in which, the decision was made to suppress permanently the diocese of Ostuni, and to incorporate its territory into the diocese of Brindisi.

The loss of their political status, as well as their bishop and their cathedral, pleased no one in Ostuni. A delegation of clergy and laity was immediately sent to Rome to complain to Pope Pius and to petition him to rescind the losses they had suffered because of "De Ulteriori'. Impressed by their statements, Pius authorized consultations with the SC Consistorial and with the Commission for the Implementation of the Concordat, and other advisors. This led to the issue, on 14 May 1821, of the bull "Si Qua Prae Ceteris." The bull cancelled all the arrangements since 1818 to suppress the diocese of Ostuni and subject its institutions to the diocese of Brindisi; it re-erected the diocese, the bishopric, the cathedral, and the cathedral Chapter of Ostuni. It appointed the archbishops of Brindisi to be the perpetual administrators of the diocese of Ostuni.

=== New metropolitan archdiocese and suppression of others ===
In accordance with the decrees of the Second Vatican Council, the Episcopal Conference of Apulia petitioned the Holy See (Pope) that Lecce, which had seen a tremendous increase in population and had become the capital of an Italian civic province, be made a metropolitan and that a new ecclesiastical province be created. After wide consultations among all affected parties, Pope John Paul II issued a decree on 20 October 1980, elevating Lecce to the status of metropolitan see. He also created the new ecclesiastical province of Lecce, whose constituent bishoprics (suffragans) were to be: Brindisi (no longer a metropolitanate, though the archbishop allowed to retain the title of archbishop), Otranto (no longer a metropolitanate, though the archbishop allowed to retain the title of archbishop), Gallipoli, Nardò, Ostuni, and Uxentina-S. Mariae Leucadensis (Ugento).

=== Diocesan Reorganization ===
Following the Second Vatican Council, and in accordance with the norms laid out in the council's decree, Christus Dominus chapter 40, Pope Paul VI ordered a reorganization of the ecclesiastical provinces in southern Italy. Pope Paul VI ordered consultations among the members of the Congregation of Bishops in the Vatican Curia, the Italian Bishops Conference, and the various dioceses concerned.

On 18 February 1984, the Vatican and the Italian State signed a new and revised concordat. Based on the revisions, a set of Normae was issued on 15 November 1984, which was accompanied in the next year, on 3 June 1985, by enabling legislation. According to the agreement, the practice of having one bishop govern two separate dioceses at the same time, aeque personaliter, was abolished. The Vatican continued consultations which had begun under Pope John XXIII for the merging of small dioceses, especially those with personnel and financial problems, into one combined diocese.

On 30 September 1986, Pope John Paul II ordered that the archdiocese of Brindisi and the diocese of Ostuni merged into one diocese with one bishop, with the Latin title Archidioecesis Brundusina-Ostunensis. The seat of the diocese was to be in Brindisi, and its cathedral was to serve as the cathedral of the merged diocese. The cathedral in Ostuni was to have the honorary titles of "co-cathedral"; the cathedral Chapter was to be a Capitulum Concathedralis. There was to be only one diocesan Tribunal, in Brindisi, and likewise one seminary, one College of Consultors, and one Priests' Council. The territory of the new diocese was to include the territory of the suppressed dioceses of Ostuni.

== Bishops of Ostuni ==
Erected: 11th Century
Latin Name: Ostunensis
Metropolitan: Archdiocese of Brindisi (until 1980), then Lecce.

=== to 1370 ===
- Deodatus (Datto) (attested 1059, 1098)

...

- Robertus (attested 1120? – 1137)

...

- Joannes Mammuni (attested 1140 – 1160)
- Petrus (attested 1169)

...

- Maroldus (attested 1182 – 1185)
- Ursileo (attested 1188 – 1208)

...

- Raynaldus (attested 1217)
- Thaddeus (attested 1220 – 1225)

...

- Petrus de Sabastiano (attested 1236 – 1267)

Sede vacante (attested 1272 – 1274)

- Robertus (attested 1275 – 1297)

...

- Nicolaus (attested 1306)
- Philippus
- Aegidius de Altrachia, O.P. (1329 – 1336)
- Francesco Cavalleri (1337 – 1362)
- Pietro Calici, O.P. (1362 – 1370)

=== 1370 to 1818 ===
- Hugo da Scuria, O.Min. (1370 – 1374)
- Bartolommeo Mezzavacca (1374 – 1378)
- Nicolaus de Severola, O.Min. (1380 – ? ) Avignon Obedience
- Joannes Picolbassis (c. 1380 – 1383) Roman Obedience
- Joannes (1383 – 1412) Roman Obedience
- Antonio Palucci, O.Min. (1413 – 1423?) "Pisan Obedience"
- Joannes de Pede (1423 – 1437)
- Nicolaus de Arpono (1437 – 1470)
- Bartholomaeus Antonii (1470 – 1478)
- Francesco Spalluci (1478 – 1484)
- Carlo Gualandi (1484 – 1498)
- Francesco Riccardi (1499 – 1504) Bishop-elect

Ascanio Sforza (1504 –1505) Perpetual Administrator
Sede vacante ? (1505 – 1509)

- Corrado Caracciolo (1509 – 1517)
- Giovanni Antonio Ruggieri (1517 – 1530)
- Pietro Bovio (1530 – 1557)
- Giovanni Carlo Bovio (1557 – 1564)
- Vincenzo Cornelio Cajetani (1564 – 1578)
- Giulio Cesare Carafa (1578 – 1603 Died)
- Giovanni Domenico d'Ettore (1604 – 1606 Died).
- Vincenzo Meligne (1606 – 1639)
- Fabio Magnesi (1640 – 1659)
- Carlo Personè (1660 – 1678)
- Benedetto Milazzi (10 Apr 1679 – Nov 1706)
- Bisanzio Fili (11 Apr 1707 – Apr 1720)
- Conus Luchini dal Verme (16 Dec 1720 – 12 Apr 1747)
- Francesco Antonio Scoppa (15 May 1747 – 25 Feb 1782)
- Giovanni Battista Brancaccio (1792 – 1794)

[Dionysio Izzo (1797)]

Sede vacante (1794 – 1818)

27 June 1818: diocese of Ostuni suppressed, and its territory assigned to the Archdiocese of Brindisi.
14 May 1821: diocese of Ostuni restored, but assigned to the Archdiocese of Brindisi in perpetual administration

== See also ==
- List of Catholic dioceses in Italy
- Catholic Church in Italy

== Bibliography ==
=== Reference for bishops ===
- Gams, Pius Bonifatius (1873). Series episcoporum Ecclesiae catholicae: quotquot innotuerunt a beato Petro apostolo (in Latin). Ratisbon: Typis et Sumptibus Georgii Josephi Manz. p. 910.
- Eubel, Conradus, ed. (1913). Hierarchia catholica (in Latin). Vol. Tomus 1 (second ed.). Münster: Libreria Regensbergiana.
- Eubel, Conradus, ed. (1914). Hierarchia catholica (in Latin). Vol. Tomus 2 (second ed.). Münster: Libreria Regensbergiana.
- Gulik, Guilelmus (1923). Eubel, Conradus (ed.). Hierarchia catholica (in Latin). Vol. Tomus 3 (second ed.). Münster: Libreria Regensbergiana.
- Gauchat, Patritius (Patrice) (1935). Hierarchia catholica (in Latin). Vol. Tomus IV (1592-1667). Münster: Libraria Regensbergiana.
- Ritzler, Remigius; Sefrin, Pirminus (1952). Hierarchia catholica medii et recentis aevi V (1667-1730). Patavii: Messagero di S. Antonio.
- Ritzler, Remigius; Sefrin, Pirminus (1958). Hierarchia catholica medii et recentis aevi (in Latin). Vol. Tomus VI (1730-1799). Patavii: Messagero di S. Antonio.

=== Studies ===
- Cappelletti, Giuseppe (1870). Le chiese d'Italia dalla loro origine sino ai nostri giorni (in Italian). Vol. Tomo vigesimo primo (21). Venezia: G. Antonelli. pp. 123–127.
- D'Avino, Vincenzio (1848). Cenni storici sulle chiese arcivescovili, vescovili, e prelatizie (nullius) del regno delle due Sicilie (in Italian). Naples: dalle stampe di Ranucci. pp. 515–519.
- Jurleo, Stefano (1858). Della origine di Ostuni considerata sotto il triplice aspetto: storico, politico, religioso. Napoli: G. Carluccio.
- Kamp, Norbert (1975). Kirche und Monarchie im staufischen Königreich Sizilien. I. Prosopographische Grundlegung: 2. Apulien und Kalabrien. München: Wilhelm Fink Verlag. (in German)
- Kehr, Paul Fridolin (1962). Italia pontificia. Vol. IX: Samnium — Apulia — Lucania. (in Latin). Berlin: Weidmann.
- Leverano, Girolamo Marci di (1855). Descrizione, origini, e successi della provincia d'Otranto (in Italian). Napoli: stamperia dell' Iride. pp. 383–403.
- Palumbo, Pier Fausto (1997). I documenti della storia medievale di Ostuni. (in Italian). Fasano: Schena, 1997.
- Pepe, Ludovico (1884). I documenti per la storia di Villanova sul porto di Ostuni. (in Italian). Trani: V. Vecchi 1884.
- Pepe, Ludovico (1891). Memorie storico-diplomatiche della chiesa vescovile di Ostuni. (in Italian). Valle de Pompei: B. Longo.
- Ughelli, Ferdinando; Coleti, Niccolò (1721). Italia sacra sive De episcopis Italiæ, et insularum adjacentium (in Latin). Vol. Tomus nonus (9). Venice: apud Sebastianum Coleti. pp. 46–52.
