= Fray Íñigo Abbad y Lasierra =

Benedictine monk; first historian to document Puerto Rico's history

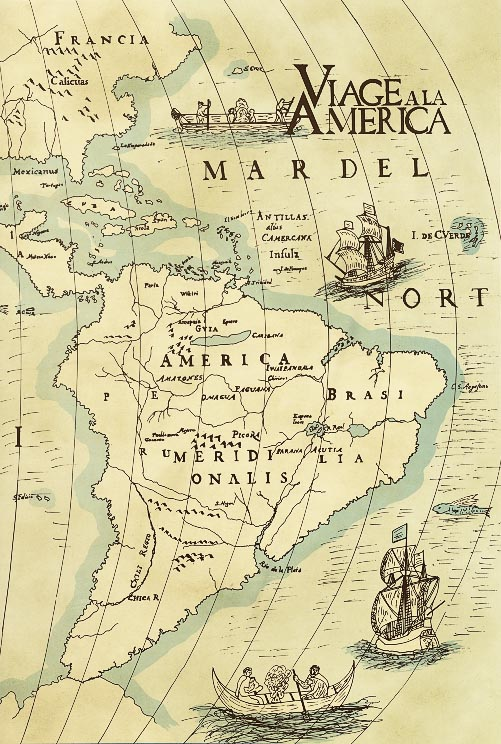
Viage a la América

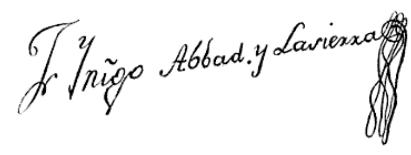
Fray Íñigo Abbad y Lasierra's signature

Fray Íñigo Abbad y Lasierra (1745–1813), born in Estadilla, Spain, was a Benedictine monk and the first historian to extensively document Puerto Rico's history, nationality, and culture.

== Biography ==
Abbad arrived in Puerto Rico in 1771 at age 26 as confessor and personal secretary of the bishop of the diocese of Puerto Rico, Manuel Jiménez Pérez. From 1772 to 1778, as part of his ecclesiastic duties, he visited many towns throughout the island. Also at that time, while accompanying Jiménez Pérez, he visited Cumaná, Isla Margarita, New Barcelona, the Orinoco River, Trinidad, and Venezuela. During these travels he kept a diary named Viage a la América (Voyage to America). The book was published as a facsimile in 1974 at Caracas by Banco Nacional de Ahorro y Préstamo (National Loan and Savings Bank).

While living in Puerto Rico he observed and recorded every day Puerto Rican life. In 1788, ten years after leaving Puerto Rico, he published the first comprehensive history of Puerto Rico titled Historia geográfica, civil y natural de la isla de San Juan Bautista de Puerto Rico (Geographic, civil and natural history of the island of Saint John the Baptist of Puerto Rico). In his book he described, in detail, a wide array of aspects of Puerto Rican life. Among the topics discussed are San Juan's fortifications and defenses, Taíno customs, and Puerto Rican history, society, clothing, flora, fauna, socio-economic peculiarities, and personality. He also proposes several reforms such as free commerce and the promotion of agriculture and other industries. Even though Abbad's book is the most complete historical account of Puerto Rico from 1493 to 1783, many of the historical accounts presented were obtained from second-hand sources.

The earliest known reference to the güiro, an instrument used in traditional Puerto Rican music, is in his writings. He described the güiro as one of several instruments that were used to accompany dancers. The other instruments would typically include maracas, tambourine, and one or more guitars.

In 1785, Abbad wrote Relación de la Florida (Florida Relation), an account of the Spanish presence in the Florida peninsula beginning with its discovery by Juan Ponce de León up to the establishment of French and British colonies.

== See also ==
- List of historians
