= Giovanni Domenico d'Ettore =

Most Reverend Giovanni Domenico d'Ettore
- Bishop of Ostuni
- Church: Catholic Church
- Diocese: Diocese of Ostuni
- In office: 1604–1605
- Predecessor: Giulio Cesare Carafa
- Successor: Vincenzo Meligne

Orders
- Consecration: 8 February 1604 by Girolamo Bernerio

Personal details
- Born: 1550 Reggiano, Italy
- Died: 1605 (died 55) Bishop of Ostuni

Giovanni Domenico d'Ettore (1550–1605) was a Roman Catholic prelate who served as Bishop of Ostuni (1604–1605).

== Biography ==
Giovanni Domenico d'Ettore was born in Reggiano, Italy in 1550. During 1570s he collaborated with Carlo Borromeo. On 28 January 1604, he was appointed Bishop of Ostuni by Pope Clement VIII. On 8 February 1604, he was consecrated bishop by Girolamo Bernerio, Cardinal-Bishop of Albano. He served as Bishop of Ostuni until his death in October 1605.

Catholic Church titles
Preceded by Giulio Cesare Carafa	Bishop of Ostuni; 1604–1606	Succeeded by Vincenzo Meligne
