= Bernardino de Figueroa =

Spanish composer

Bernardino de Figueroa (c.1510-November 1586) was a Spanish composer, afterwards Archbishop of Brindisi in Italy.

Figueroa entered the chapel choir in 1518 and was the first maestro de capilla at the Royal Chapel of Granada until 1551, being succeeded by Rodrigo de Ceballos in 1561. He wrote letters recommending the musical theorist Fray Juan Bermudo and in the latter's Perfecting the perfect instrument 1555, a treatise on playing the vihuela, Figueroa was listed before Cristóbal de Morales as having checked and approved the text.

From 26 November 1571 until his death he was Archbishop of Brindisi.

None of Figueroa's compositions is known to survive.
