= Archdiocese of Brindisi-Ostuni =

Latin Catholic archdiocese in Apulia, Italy

Coordinates: 40.6383°N 17.9458°E

Archdiocese of Brindisi-Ostium Archidioecesis Brundusina-Ostunensis

Catholic
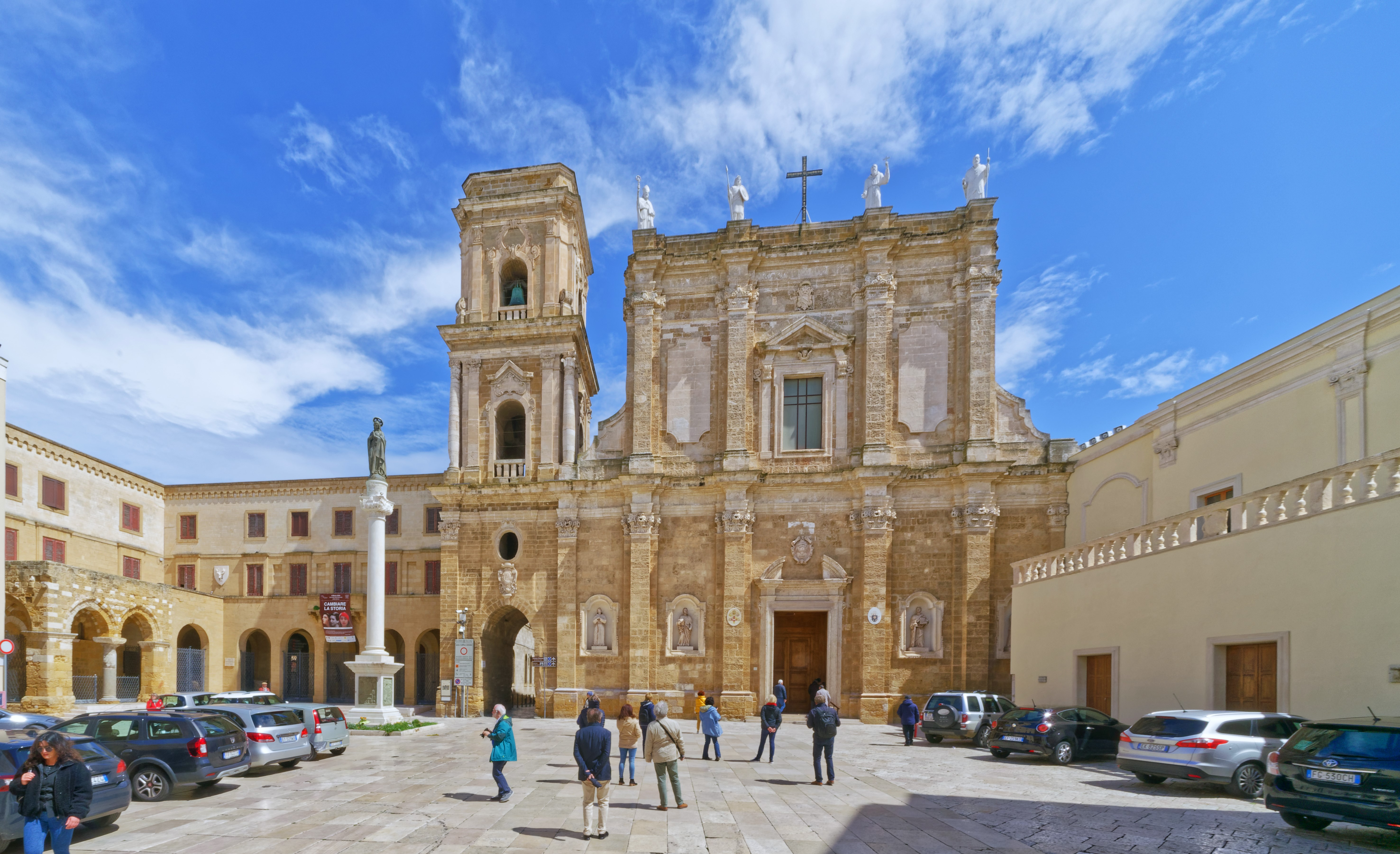
- Brindisi Cathedral

Location
- Country: Italy
- Ecclesiastical province: Lecce

Statistics
- Area: 1,253 km^{2} (484 sq mi)
- Population: Total; Catholics: (as of 2022); 263,650 (est.); 259,400 (est.)
- Parishes: 58 ▼

Information
- Denomination: Catholic Church
- Sui iuris church: Latin Church
- Rite: Roman Rite
- Established: 4th Century
- Cathedral: Cathedral Basilica of the Visitation and Saint John the Baptist
- Co-cathedral: Co-cathedral of S. Maria Assunta
- Secular priests: 113 ▼ (diocesan); 31 ▼ (Religious Orders); Permanent Deacons 16 ▲

Current leadership
- Pope: Leo XIV
- Archbishop: Giovanni Intini
- Bishops emeritus: Rocco Talucci; Domenico Caliandro

Website
- www.brindisiostuni.chiesacattolica.it

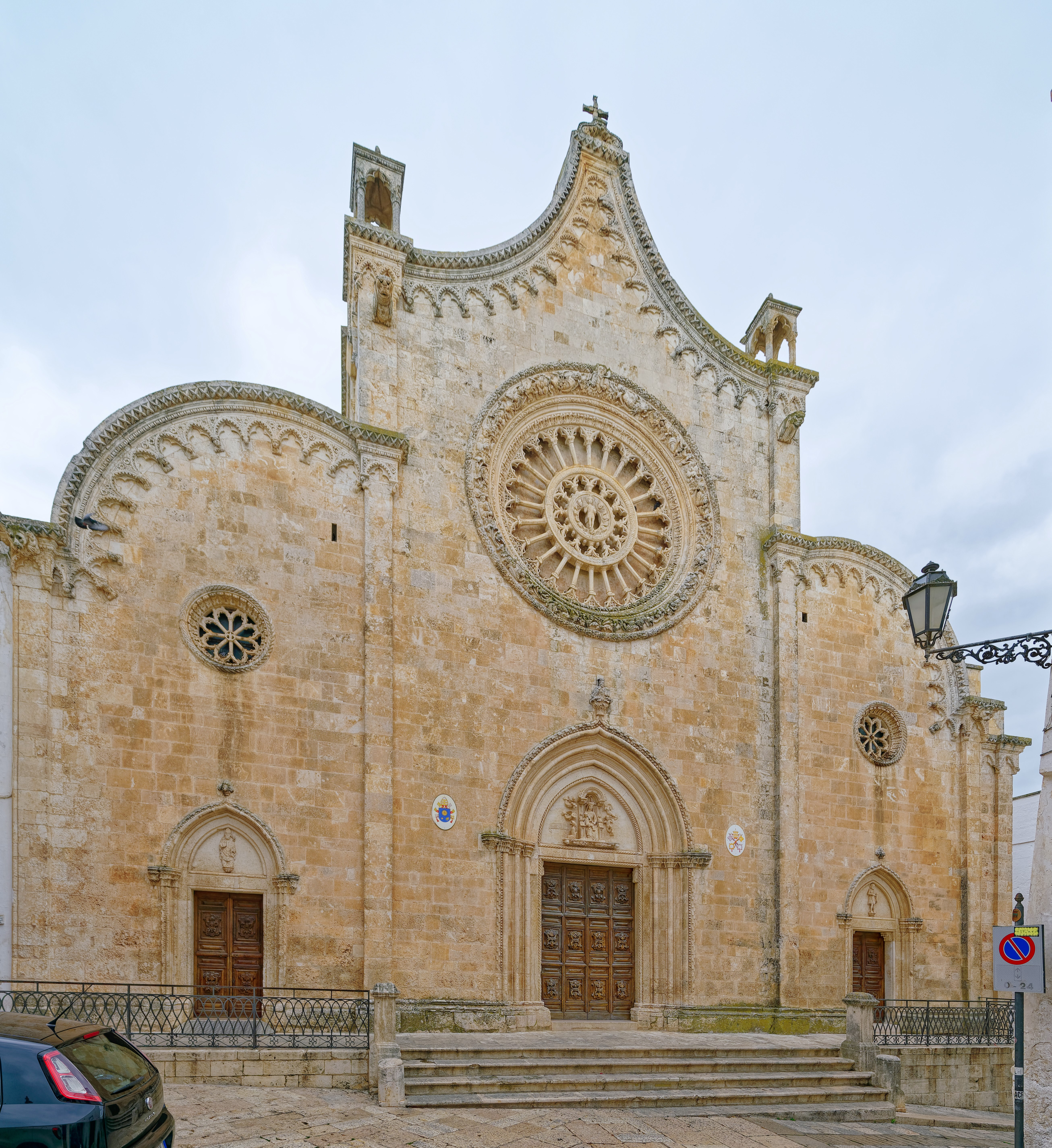
Ostuni Cathedral

The Archdiocese of Brindisi-Ostium (Latin: Archidioecesis Brundusina-Ostunensis) is a Latin Church diocese of the Catholic Church in Apulia, has carried its present name since 1986. It is a suffragan of the archdiocese of Lecce.

The historical archdiocese of Brindisi was promoted from a diocese in the tenth century. The territory of the diocese of Ostuni was added to it in 1821. The archdiocese lost its status as metropolitan see in 1980.

== History ==
There is no historical proof for early beginnings of Christianity in Brindisi. The account given by Arnobius, who died c. 330, of the fall of Simon Magus, who withdrew to Brindisi and cast himself from a high rock into the sea, is mythological, not historical.

According to various local legends, the first Bishop of Brindisi is said to have been Leucius of Brindisi, about 165, who later is claimed to have undergone martyrdom. Leucius is called a confessor or, by Pope Gregory I, a martyr. He is said to have been from Alexandria in Egypt, to have come to Brindisi already a bishop, with his archdeacon, and to have baptised some 27,000 people. The earliest account of his life says he died under the Emperor Theodosius; Theodosius I ruled from 379–395, and Theodosius II from 408–450. Other versions put his death under Commodus, between 180 and 192, and yet others place his martyrdom under Valerianus, 253–259. That he was made a bishop from the east rather than one connected with Rome suggests that his story was worked on when Brindisi was subject to Constantinople, between the 8th and 10th centuries.

=== Oria ===
The Diocese of Brindisi at first embraced the territory comprised within the present diocese of Oria. After Brindisi had been conquered by the Arabs in 839, the bishops of Brindisi took refuge in the better fortified town of Oria and took the double title as bishops of Brindisi and Oria. Some time after the Saracens had been evicted from Brindisi, bishop Theodosius was successful in obtaining back the relics of Saint Leucius which he placed in a basilica above the martyrium where the relics had originally been placed. Theodosius also introduced the veneration of Saint Barsanuphius to his diocese and acted as papal legate for popes Hadrian III and Stephen V for whom he went to imperial court of Constantinople.

In 1572–1591, during the tenure of the Spanish Bishop Bernardino de Figueroa movements were made to separate Oria as seat of a new diocese. The town was erected into an episcopal see on 8 May 1591 by Pope Gregory XIV, after the death of the Spaniard, Archbishop Bernardino de Figueroa. After an interval of four and a half years first bishop of Oria was appointed, Vincenzo del Tufo, in 1596.

In the reorganization of the dioceses of the Kingdom of Naples in 1818 Brindisi was combined with the Diocese of Ostuni, formerly its suffragan.

Brindisi has been an archiepiscopal see since the tenth century. The ancient cathedral was located outside the city, but in 1140 Roger II of Sicil built the present cathedral in the centre of the city.

=== Synods ===
A diocesan synod was an irregularly held, but important, meeting of the bishop of a diocese and his clergy. Its purpose was (1) to proclaim generally the various decrees already issued by the bishop; (2) to discuss and ratify measures on which the bishop chose to consult with his clergy; (3) to publish statutes and decrees of the diocesan synod, of the provincial synod, and of the Holy See.

In 1608, Bishop Juan de Falces (1605-1636) presided over a diocesan synod. He held another, his third, on 10 September 1615. A fourth took place on 16 October 1616. A fifth diocesan synod was held on 9 April 1617, and a sixth on 22 April 1618. His seventh synod was held on 8 September 1618, his eighth on 2 May 1621, and his ninth on 10 April 1622.

== Bishops of Brindisi ==
=== to 1200 ===
- Leucius ( ? )

[Marcus (attested 325)]
[Aproculus (Proculus)]
...

- Julianus (attested c.492–496)

...

- Pretiosus (6th cent. ?)

...

- Theodosius (late 9th cent. ?)

...

- Andrea (died 979)

...

- Nardo (c. 1040)
- Eustasius (c.1052–c.1071)

...

- Gregorius ? (attested 1074, 1080 ?)

Archbishops of Brindisi e Oria

- Godinus (1085–1098)
- Baldwin (attested 1100)
- Nicholas (1101–1105)
- Guilelmus (1105–1118)
- Bajalardus (Bailardo) (1118–1143)
- Lupus (1144–1172)
- Wilelmus (1173–1181)
- Petrus (1183–1196)
- Girardus (1196–c.1216)

=== 1200 to 1500 ===
- Peregrinus (1216–1224)
- Petrus de Bisignano (1225–1239?)
- Petrus Paparone (1239–1254?)
- Peregrinus (1254–1288?)
- Adenulfus (1288–1295)
- Andreas Pandone (1296–1304)

Radulfus (1304–1306) Administrator

- Bartholomaeus (1306–1319)
- Bertrandus, O.P. (1319–1333)
- Guilelmus Isardi, O.Min. (1333-1344)
- Guilelmus de Rosières, O.S.B. (1344–1346)
- Galhard de Carceribus (1346–1348)
- Joannes de Porta (1348–1352)
- Pinus, O.P. (1352–1378?)
- Gurellus (1379– ) Avignon Obedience
- Marinus del Judice (c.1379–1382) Roman Obedience
- Riccardus de Rogeriis (1382–c.1409) Roman Obedience
- Victor (1409–1411) Roman Obedience
- Paulus (Romanus) (1411– ? )
- Pandullus (1412–1414) Pisan Obedience
- Aragonus de Malaspina (1415–1418) Pisan Obedience
- Paulus (1418–1423)
- Petrus Gattula (1423– )
- Pietro de Gattula (1423-1437)
- Goffredo Carusio (1453-1471)
- Francesco de Arenis (1477-1483)
- Roberto Piscicelli (1484-1513)

=== 1500 to 1800 ===
- Domingo Idiocáiz (1513-1518)
- Gian Pietro Carafa (1518-1524)
- Girolamo Aleandro (1524–1541)
- Francesco Aleandro (1541-1560)

Sede vacante (1560–1564)

- Giovanni Carlo Bovio (1564–1572)
- Bernardino de Figueroa (1571–1591)
- Andrés de Ayardis (1591-1595)
- Juan Pedrosa, O.S.B. (1598-1604)
- Juan Santisteban de Falces, O.S.Hier. (1605-1636)
- Francesco Surgenti (Sorgente), C.R. (1638-1640)
- Dionysius Odriscol, O.F.M. Obs. (1640-1650)
- Lorenzo Reynoso (1652-1656)

Sede vacante (1656–1659)

- Francesco de Estrada (1659-1671)
- Alfonso Álvarez Barba Ossorio, O. Carm. (1673–1676)
- Manuel de la Torre (1677-1679)
- Giovanni de Torrecilla y Cárdenas (1681-1688)
- Francesco Ramírez, O.P. (1689-1697)
- Agustín Antonio de Arellano, O.S.A. (1698-1699)
- Bernabé de Castro, O.S.A. (1700-1707)

Sede vacante (1707–1715)

- Pablo de Vilana Perlas (1715-1723)
- Andrea Maddalena (1724–1743)
- Antonino Sersale (1743-1750)
- Giovanni Angelo Ciocchi del Monte (1751-1759)
- Domenico Rovegno (1759-1763)
- Giuseppe de Rossi (1764-1778)
- Giovanni Battista Rivellini (1778-1795)Rivellini:
- Annibale Di Leo (1798-1814)

=== since 1800 ===
Sede vacante (1814–1818)

- Antonio Barretta, Theat. (1818–1819)
- Giuseppe Maria Tedeschi, O.P. (1819-1825)
- Pietro Consiglio (1826–1839)
- Didacus (Diego) Planeta (1841–1850)
- Giuseppe Rotondo (1850-1855)
- Raffaele Ferrigno (1856-1875)
- Luigi Maria Aguilar, B. (1875-1892)
- Salvatore Palmieri, C.Pp.S. (1893-1905)
- Luigi Morando, C.S.S. (1906-1909)
- Tommaso Valerio Valeri, O.F.M. (1910-1942)
- Francesco de Filippis (1942-1953)
- Nicola Margiotta (1953-1975)
- Settimio Todisco (1975-2000)
- Rocco Talucci (2000-2012)
- Domenico Caliandro 2012–2022
- Giovanni Intini 2022–present

== See also ==
- Timeline of Brindisi

== Bibliography ==
=== Reference for bishops ===
- Gams, Pius Bonifatius (1873). Series episcoporum Ecclesiae catholicae: quotquot innotuerunt a beato Petro apostolo (in Latin). Ratisbon: Typis et Sumptibus Georgii Josephi Manz. pp. 862–863.
- Eubel, Conradus, ed. (1913). Hierarchia catholica (in Latin). Vol. Tomus 1 (second ed.). Münster: Libreria Regensbergiana.
- Eubel, Conradus, ed. (1914). Hierarchia catholica (in Latin). Vol. Tomus 2 (second ed.). Münster: Libreria Regensbergiana.
- Gulik, Guilelmus (1923). Eubel, Conradus (ed.). Hierarchia catholica (in Latin). Vol. Tomus 3 (second ed.). Münster: Libreria Regensbergiana.
- Gauchat, Patritius (Patrice) (1935). Hierarchia catholica (in Latin). Vol. Tomus IV (1592-1667). Münster: Libraria Regensbergiana.
- Ritzler, Remigius; Sefrin, Pirminus (1952). Hierarchia catholica medii et recentis aevi V (1667-1730). Patavii: Messagero di S. Antonio.
- Ritzler, Remigius; Sefrin, Pirminus (1958). Hierarchia catholica medii et recentis aevi (in Latin). Vol. Tomus VI (1730-1799). Patavii: Messagero di S. Antonio.
- Ritzler, Remigius; Sefrin, Pirminus (1968). Hierarchia Catholica medii et recentioris aevi sive summorum pontificum, S. R. E. cardinalium, ecclesiarum antistitum series... A pontificatu Pii PP. VII (1800) usque ad pontificatum Gregorii PP. XVI (1846) (in Latin). Vol. VII. Monasterii: Libr. Regensburgiana.
- Remigius Ritzler; Pirminus Sefrin (1978). Hierarchia catholica Medii et recentioris aevi... A Pontificatu PII PP. IX (1846) usque ad Pontificatum Leonis PP. XIII (1903) (in Latin). Vol. VIII. Il Messaggero di S. Antonio.
- Pięta, Zenon (2002). Hierarchia catholica medii et recentioris aevi... A pontificatu Pii PP. X (1903) usque ad pontificatum Benedictii PP. XV (1922) (in Latin). Vol. IX. Padua: Messagero di San Antonio. ISBN 978-88-250-1000-8.

=== Studies ===
- Cappelletti, Giuseppe (1870). Le chiese d'Italia dalla loro origine sino ai nostri giorni (in Italian). Vol. Tomo vigesimo primo (21). Venezia: G. Antonelli. pp. 113–122.
- Carito, Giacomo (2007). "Gli arcivescovi di Brindisi sino al 674," (in Italian) in: Parola e storia, I, n. 2/ 2007, pp. 197-225.
- Carito, Giacomo (2008). "Gli arcivescovi di Brindisi dal VII al X secolo," (in Italian), in Parola e storia : rivista dell'Istituto superiore di scienze religiose San Lorenzo da Brindisi dell'Arcidiocesi di Brindisi-Ostuni, facoltà teologica pugliese Vol. 2 (2008), n. 2 (4), pp. 289-308.
- Carito, Giacomo (2009). "Gli arcivescovi di Brindisi nell'XI secolo," (in Italian), in Parola e storia Anno 3 (2009), n. 1 (5), pp. 57-78.
- Carito, Giacomo (2010). "Gli arcivescovi di Brindisi nel XII secolo," (in Italian), in: Parola e storia Anno 4 (2010), n. 1 (7), pp. 51-89.
- Coco, F. A. (1914). Titoli dignitari e nobiliari della sede arcivescovile di Brindisi. Studio storico critico. Lecce: Giurdignano, 1914. (in Italian)
- Guerrieri, Vito (1848), "Brindisi", in: Vincenzo D'Avino (1848). Cenni storici sulle chiese arcivescovili, vescovili, e prelatizie (nulluis) del Regno delle Due Sicilie (in Italian). Napoli: dalle stampe di Ranucci. pp. 98–127.
- Kamp, Norbert (1975). Kirche und Monarchie im staufischen Königreich Sizilien. I. Prosopographische Grundlegung: 2. Apulien und Kalabrien. München: Wilhelm Fink Verlag. (in German)
- Kehr, Paul Fridolin (1962). Italia pontificia. Vol. IX: Samnium — Apulia — Lucania. Berlin: Weidmann. (in Latin)
- Leverano, Girolamo Marci di (1855). Descrizione, origini, e successi della provincia d'Otranto (in Italian). Napoli: stamperia dell' Iride. pp. 383–403.
- Lanzoni, Francesco (1927). Le diocesi d'Italia dalle origini al principio del secolo VII (an. 604). Faenza: F. Lega, pp. 305–310, 312, 317. (in Italian)
- Ughelli, Ferdinando; Coleti, Niccolò (1721). Italia sacra sive De episcopis Italiæ, et insularum adjacentium (in Latin). Vol. Tomus nonus (9). Venice: apud Sebastianum Coleti. pp. 3–46.
