= Josep Moragues i Mas =

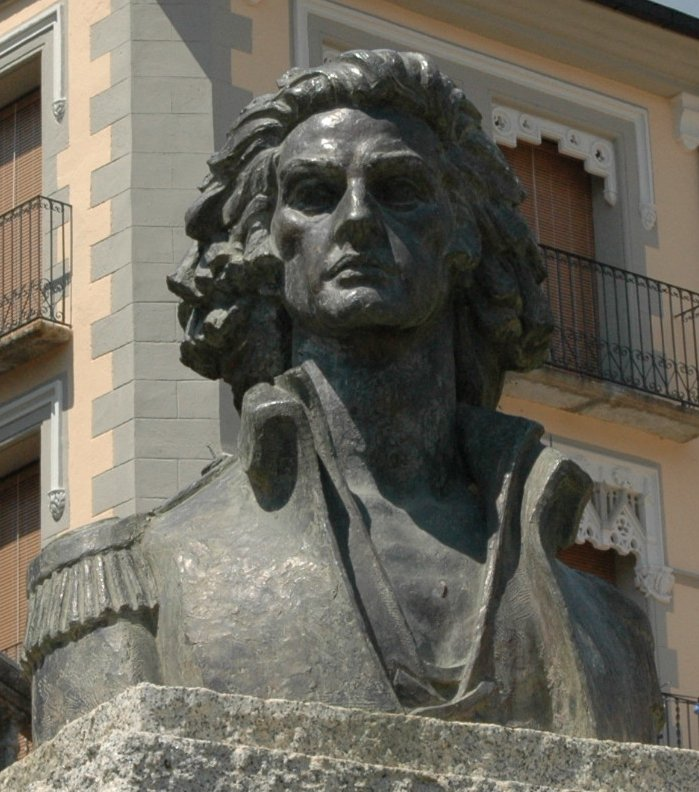
Josep Moragues

Josep Moragues i Mas (Catalan pronunciation: [ʒuˈzɛb muˈɾaɣəs]; 1669 in Sort – 1715 in Barcelona) was a Catalan general during the War of the Spanish Succession. He fought on the Archduke Charles' side.

After Barcelona was defeated on 11 September 1714, he tried to sail to Mallorca in order to continue the resistance against Philippist invasion, but he was betrayed and imprisoned. He was tortured and finally executed on 27 March 1715. His corpse was butchered, the head placed inside a cage which was hanged in the streets for 12 years. This was intended as a warning for those who might rebel against the new King's power.

== Later political significance ==
Catalanists regard him as a national hero, a martyr for Catalonia. As with Rafael Casanova, there are several homages and floral offerings around monuments dedicated to him during commemorations of 11 September, which was instituted by Catalanists in the 19th century as the National Day of Catalonia in remembrance of the battle fought and lost by Moragues amongst others.

== See also ==
- Principality of Catalonia
- Generalitat de Catalunya
- Consell de Cent
- La Coronela
- War of the Spanish Succession
- National Day of Catalonia
- General Moragues
- Rafael Casanova
