= Ostuni railway station =

Railway station in Ostuni, Italy

Ostuni
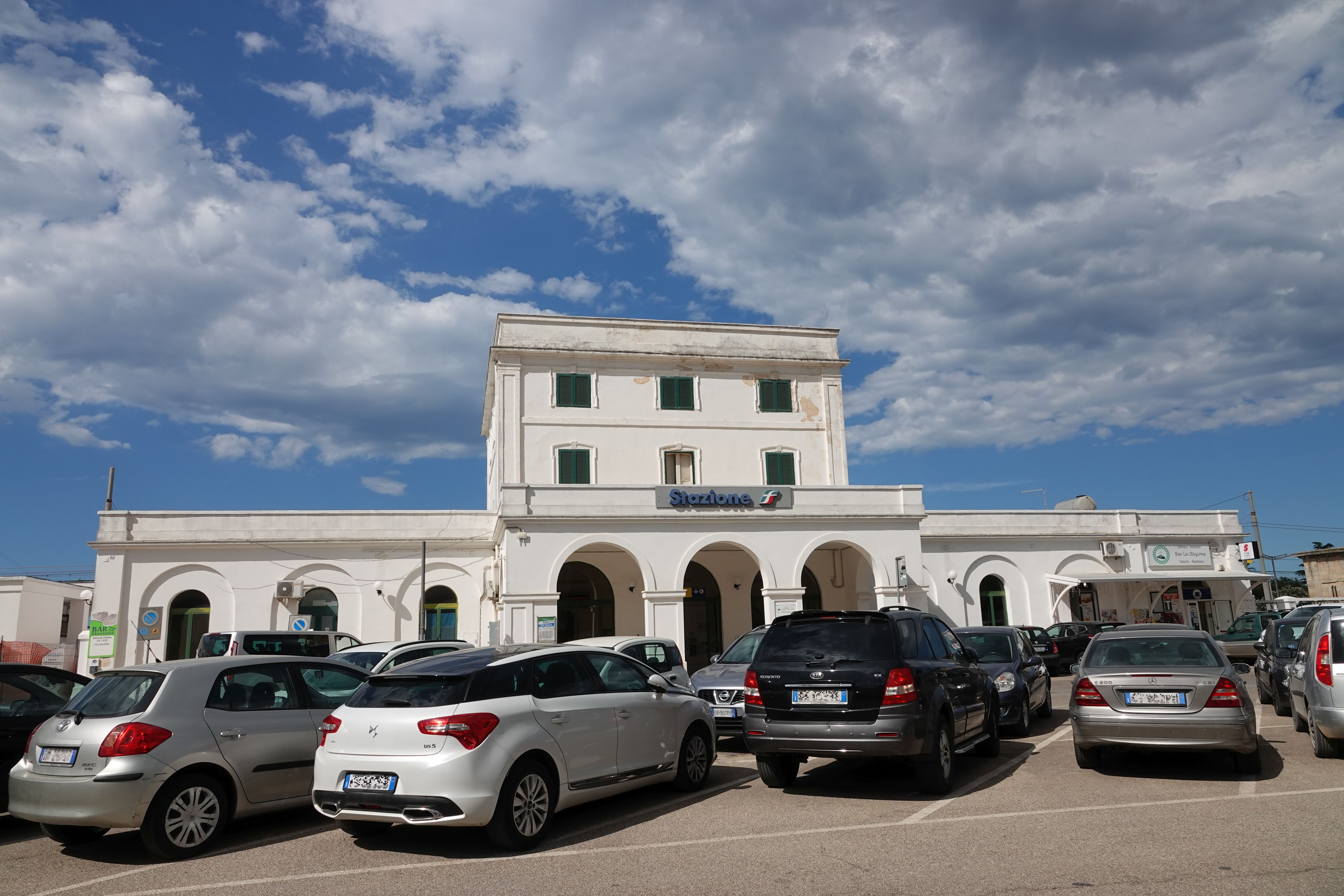

General information
- Location: Piazza Stazione, Ostuni, Brindisi, Apulia; Italy
- Coordinates: 40°45′08″N 17°34′51″E
- Operator: Rete Ferroviaria Italiana
- Line: Ancona–Lecce (Trenitalia)
- Platforms: 3
- Train operators: Trenitalia

Other information
- Classification: Silver

History
- Opened: 1865; 161 years ago
Location
- Location within Apulia Location within Italy

Ostuni (Italian: Stazione di Ostuni) is a railway station near the Italian town of Ostuni, in the Province of Brindisi, Apulia. The station lies on the Adriatic Railway (Ancona–Lecce) and was opened in 1865. The train services are operated by Trenitalia.

== Train services ==
The station is served by the following service(s):

- Intercity services Bologna - Rimini - Ancona - Pescara - Foggia - Bari - Brindisi - Lecce
- Intercity services Milan - Reggio Emilia - Bologna - Rimini - Ancona - Pescara - Foggia - Bari - Brindisi - Lecce
- Night train (Intercity Notte) Rome - Foggia - Bari - Brindisi - Lecce
- Night train (Intercity Notte) Milan - Parma - Bologna - Ancona - Pescara - Foggia - Bari - Brindisi - Lecce
- Night train (Intercity Notte) Turin - Alessandria - Bologna - Ancona - Pescara - Foggia - Bari - Brindisi - Lecce
- Regional services (Treno regionale) Foggia - Barletta - Bari - Monopoli - Brindisi - Lecce

== See also ==
- Railway stations in Italy
- List of railway stations in Apulia
- Rail transport in Italy
- History of rail transport in Italy
