= Francesc de Castellví i Obando =

Catalan Austriacist army officer and historian

- Born: 1682; Montblanc, Principality of Catalonia Spain
- Died: September 15, 1757 (aged 74–75); Vienna, Archduchy of Austria
- Notable work: Narraciones Históricas desde el año 1700 hasta el año 1725

Francesc de Castellví i Obando (1682 – 15 September 1757) was a Spanish Catalan chronicler and historian who fought for the Austriacist side in the 1714 Siege of Barcelona. Castellví is primarily known for writing Narraciones Históricas during his stay in Austria, a work in which he explains the events that took place during the Siege of Barcelona based upon his own experiences.

== Biography ==
Francesc de Castellví was born in 1682 in Montblanc, Spain ,in the Principality of Catalonia. Raised in a small but distinguished family, Castellví received a good education, studying science and literature during his youth. During the War of the Spanish Succession, he was a member of the military branch of the Junta de Braços, one of the key political organizations in Catalonia during the war. In 1713, with King Philip V's troops besieging Barcelona, Castellví and the rest of the members of the Junta de Braços decided to continue resisting the siege, despite receiving several capitulation offers from the Bourbonics and not having any possibility of success. He fought as a captain during the defense of Barcelona, being a member of the Coronela, an urban militia mainly composed of civilians, that sought to defend the city. Castellví led the 2nd company of the Immaculada Concepció de la Verge Maria battalion as a captain. On the 14 of August, he was wounded while fighting at the Sant Pere bastion. During the September 11 battle, while he and his men were performing a counterattack on the Bourbonic forces, Barcelona capitulated, thus ending the conflict. Once Philip V's troops occupied Barcelona, Castellví was sentenced to surveillanced liberty, and had all his territorial possessions confiscated.

In 1726, a peace treaty was signed between Philip V and Charles VI. The treaty provided amnesty for political prisoners, and Castellví exiled himself to Austria, where he wrote Narraciones Históricas desde el año 1700 hasta el año 1725. He used Bourbonic and Austriacist sources in order to complete his work, as well as accounts from other figures who emigrated to Austria after the war and his own personal experiences.

He was amongst the Catalans who embarked in an expedition in the Danube River from 1735 to 1738, in an attempt to found a new city, named Nova Barcelona. Nevertheless, the project failed, due to the dangerous proximity of the city to the Ottoman Empire and a black plague epidemic. He then returned to Vienna, where emperor Charles VI granted him an annuity, for being an ex-participant of the War of Succession. He remained in Austria until his death in 1757.
