= Ramon de Vilana Perlas =

Catalan noble (1663–1741)

Ramon Frederic de Vilana-Perlas (1663 in Oliana, Urgell, Spain – June 5, 1741 in Vienna, Austria) was a Spanish nobleman of Catalan descent who became a man of the utmost confidence of the Charles VI, Holy Roman Emperor during the War of the Spanish Succession and the following years, working in favor of the Catalan and Aragonese exiles in the court of Vienna.

After leaving Barcelona in 1713, Vilana-Perlas settled in the kingdom of Naples, where his brother Pau Vilana Perlas (28 January 1669, in Barcelona – 6 May 1729, in Salerno) was Appointed Archbishop of Brindisi (16 December 1715) and on 6 February 1723 selected Archbishop of Salerno. In exchange for some of his possessions in the Kingdom of Naples, Ramon de Vilana Perlas acquired from the Imperial Chamber of Inner Austria part of the lands of the Zrinski family in the surroundings of Fiume confiscated after the Zrinski-Frankopan conspiracy. The estates were situated near Karlovac, Brod na Kupi, Ozalj, Čabar, Gerovo and several smaller manors in Gorski kotar, as well as Bakar, Grobnik, Hreljin, Grižane, Kraljevica and other properties on the Adriatic coast and its hinterland.

Trieste was intended in Charles VI's plans to link Austrian lands with his remaining Spanish possessions, centred on Naples. Fiume had to provide a link with Hungary and the Banat of Temesvar where the colony of Spanish exiles of Nova Barcelona was to be founded. The operation was entrusted to Ramon de Vilana Perlas, who acted as Spanish Secretary of State to Emperor Charles VI. He was also, until his resignation in 1737 secretario de estado y de despacho - the executive of the Spanish and Belgian councils and coordinated diplomatic relations involving the Emperor's Italian and Belgian outposts.

The project failed, but links of Fiume with the Banat of Temesvar remained strong. Francesc de Vilana Perlas, the son of the Marquis Ramon de Vilana Perlas Rialp became governor of Timişoara between 1753 and 1759, and his name would be at the origin of the name of Perlez, a village in the municipality of Zrenjanin. Vilana-Perlas died in 1741 in Vienna, where he resided permanently. The management of his estates in Croatia was entrusted to Antoni de Verneda i Sauleda Rovira, (1693 in Genova – 24 March 1774, in Fiume) another Catalan exiled in Austria, nephew of Joan Francesc Verneda i Sauleda.
