= Juan Bermudo =

Spanish Friar Minor, composer, music theorist and mathematician

Juan Bermudo OFM (c. 1510 – c. 1565) was a Spanish Friar Minor who is best known as a composer, music theorist and mathematician.

== Life ==
Bermudo entered the Franciscan Order in 1525, belonging to the Province of Andalusia. He was subsequently sent to study at the University of Alcalá, where he resided at the College of Saint Peter and Paul, for friars studying at the University. He then dedicated his energies to preaching to the people of that region. The esteem he gained from the other friars of the province can be seen in his election on 24 June 1560 as a Definitor of the province.

A subsequent long period of illness led Bermudo to retire from his service as a preacher. During his recovery, he began to read various manuscripts of musical theory and began to develop his untrained, native talents in this art.

== Musician ==
Bermudo's first published work resulting from his studies was his Libro primero de la Declaración de instrumentos (1549), dedicated to King John III of Portugal. It was followed the subsequent year by Comiença el Arte Tripharia.

In his Perfecting the perfect instrument of 1555, a treatise on playing the vihuela, Bermudo lists the maestro de capilla of the Royal Chapel of Granada, Bernardino de Figueroa, and Cristóbal de Morales as having checked and approved the text.

== Works ==
Treatises:

- 1549 Libro primero de la Declaración de instrumentos musicales.
- 1550 Arte Tripharia.
- 1555 Declaración de instrumentos musicales. 5 Vols.

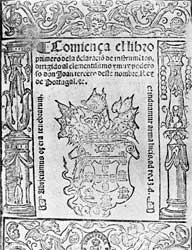
Declaración, title page.

Music for vihuela:

- Mira nera de Tarpeya.

Organ works:

- Conditor alme siderum, Ave maris stella, Vexilla regis prodeunt a 5.
