= Nova Barcelona =

Austracist colony in the Banat of Temeswar (1735-38)

Nova Barcelona (German: Neue Stadt Barcellona, Serbian: Нова Барселона) or New Barcelona, is the name of a short-lived colony of Catalan exiled Austracists existing from 1735 to 1738 that was created after the defeat of the supporters of Habsburg Dynasty. This colony was located in The Banat of Temeswar, near the site of the present town of Zrenjanin in Serbian Vojvodina. The colony was also known under the name Carlobagen.

== History ==
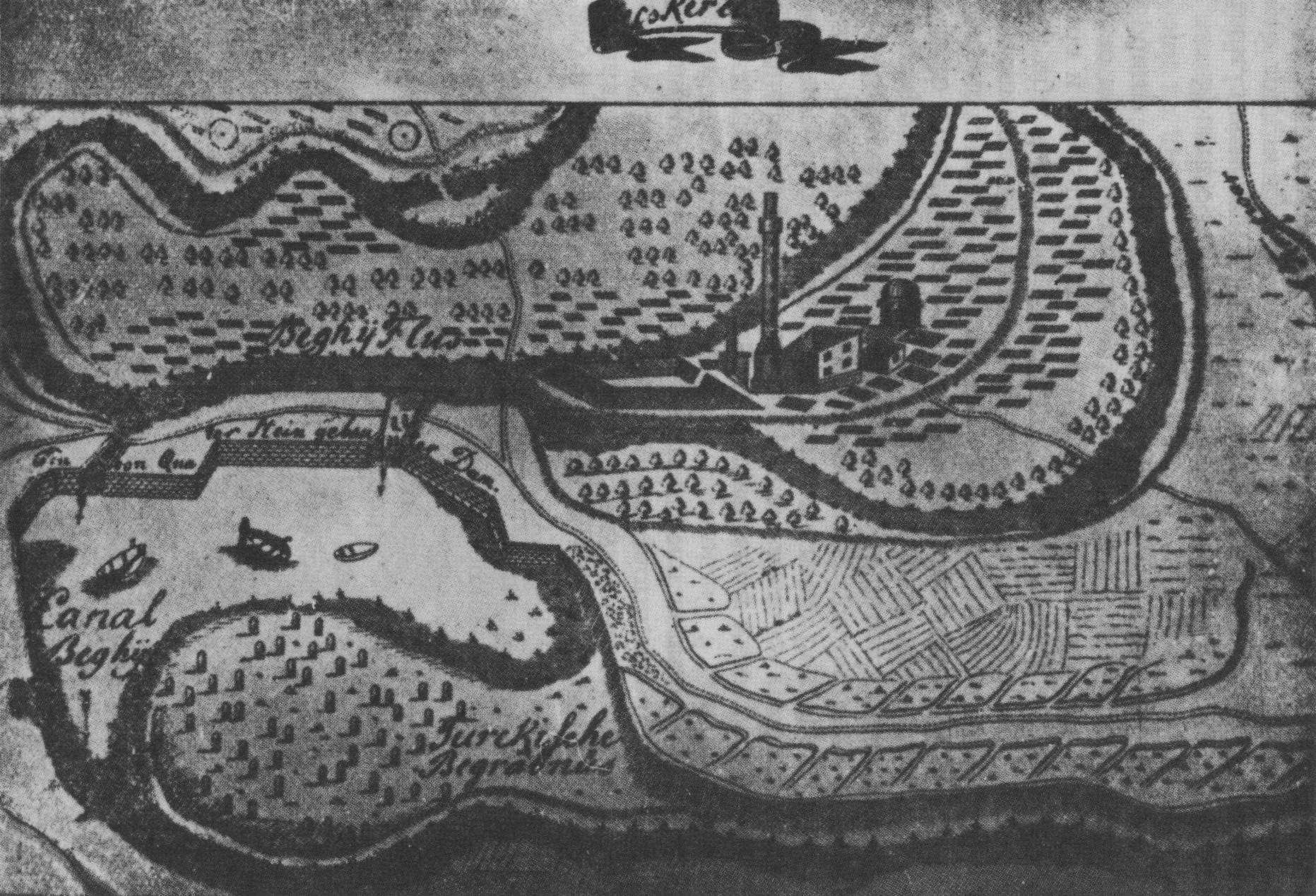
Map of Bečkerek around 1697–1698 with a minaret of the mosque that dominates the town.

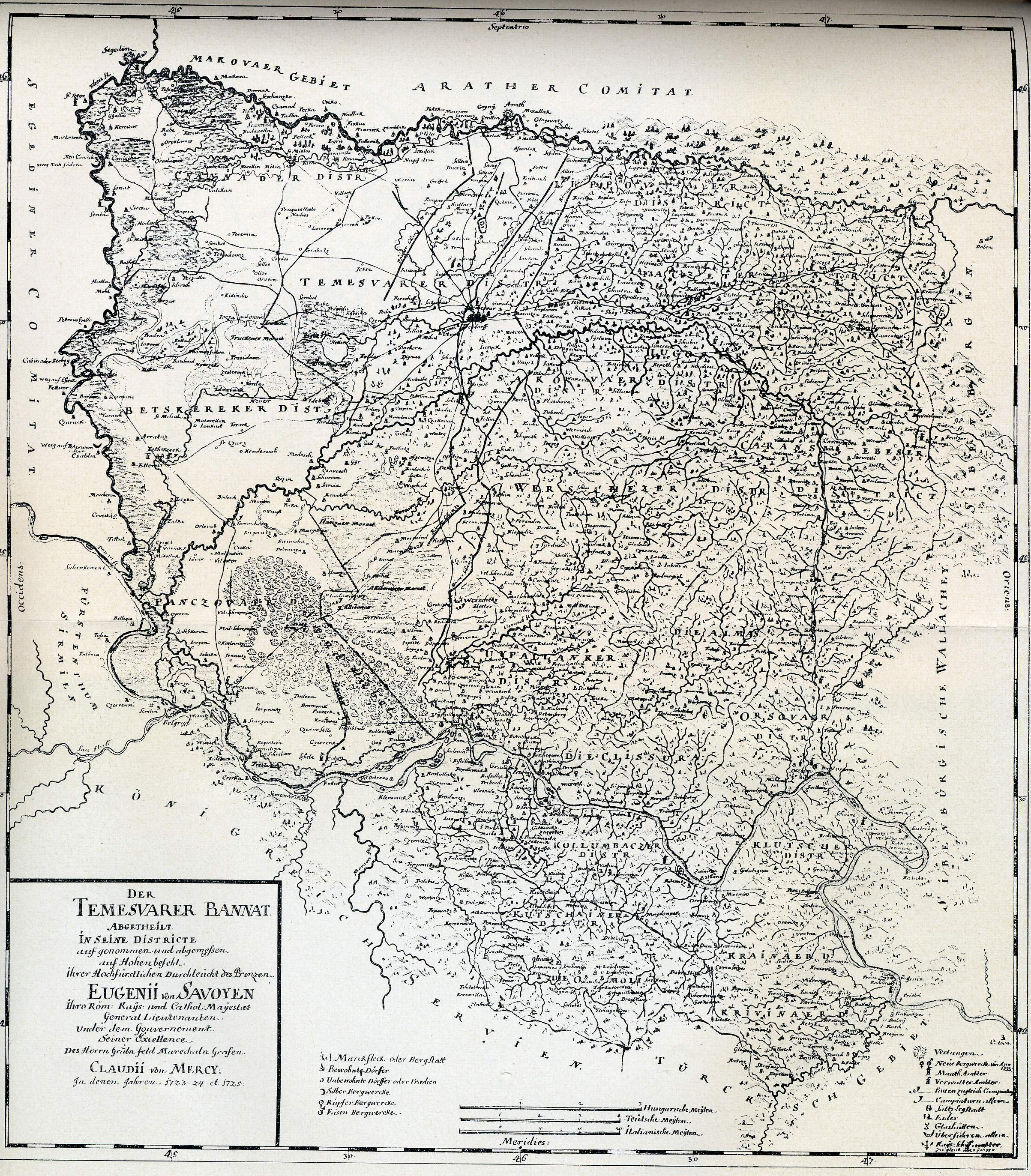
Map of the Banat of Temeswar 1718-39

In October 1716, following the Battle of Petrovaradin, a decisive Austrian victory in the Austro-Turkish War of 1716–18, the Habsburgs conquered the Ottoman town (Veliki) Bečkerek / (Nagy) Becskerek, now Zrenjanin in Vojvodina. With the Treaty of Passarowitz from July 21, 1718, the Ottoman Empire had to cede the Banat of Temeswar to the Austrian archduke. In order to develop the newly acquired region an Imperial Privileged Oriental Company (Kaiserliche privilegierte orientalische Kompagnie) was founded in 1719. It was intended to foster commerce with the Ottoman Empire through the Danubian basin and the Adriatic ports of Trieste and Fiume. The Banat was underpopulated and the imperial authorities boosted its colonization with new settlers.

== Austracists's second exile ==
In 1735, Naples and Sicily were attacked by the Spanish Bourbon King Philip V of Spain. After Habsburgs lost Spain and Naples in the first half of the 18th century, a colony of their loyalist from those lands settled, mostly, in Vienna and Buda. They were receiving pensions and social welfare but the Austrian authorities were not happy with the immigrants and decided to resettle them in the Banat, in the town of Pančevo. The authorities were quite harsh, as the Court Chamber described the settlers as "lazy and brawly", that they "loaf through Vienna and other places, being completely useless" and that purpose of the relocation is "to force them to work".

Perceived by the public as an economic burden to the treasury of the Holy Roman Empire, Charles VI tried to convert the Austracist refugees into settlers by installing them in a region bounded by the Danube River, the natural border of the empire. The settlement was to be named Nova Barcelona(New Barcelona) but also Carlobagen, Carolonoble, or Carolina seem to have been proposed.

== Arrival of settlers ==
The first group of exiles arrived in the autumn of 1735, and in 1737 there were about 800 exiles in Banat, out of some 3,500 – 5,000 present at the time in Hungary. Among them, the most numerous were those from Catalonia, followed by others from the former territories of the Crown of Aragon. Between 10% and 15% came from Sicily and Naples. Among the exiles were major figures in the War of the Spanish Succession like the brothers Rafael and Joan Nebot (General and Colonel, respectively), Captain Francesc de Castellví i Obando and probably Colonel Pere Joan Barceló i Anguera (alias Carrasquet or Carrascot, currently rendered Carrasclet).

The Chamber's relocation decision was made on 14 November 1736. It was ordered that each man will receive 5 forints, woman 2 and child 0,5 forints. The administration of the Banat of Temeswar was obligated by the Chamber to find jobs for the settlers so that money spent on them will be repaid. Catalans, called Spaniards by the locals, were granted a yearly help of 2,586 forints and all of their debts were annulled. The first group of exiles arrived in the autumn of 1735, consisting of 74 families under the leadership of the Trinitarian priest Jose Muñoz from Madrid. Towards 1737 there were about 800 exiles in the Banat. The predominant group were Catalans, followed by people from other territories of the Crown of Aragon. Between 10% and 15% came from Sicily and Naples. Among the exiles, there were major figures of the war like the Nebot brothers and Captain Castellví and Obando, among others.

Josef Huber, who was the transport commissioner in charge of the resettlement, reported that "majority of settlers have no occupation and don't comprehend anything", describing them as "impetuous and braggart" though he observed that women are mostly good in knitting and weaving. About a certain Pietro Oliva and his wife, he noted that "they drink from dusk till dawn, a wife more so than her husband".

The expedition arrived in Pančevo and from there the settlers were dispatched to Timișoara, Vršac, Stari Majur, etc. A location, just south of Bečkerek, or modern Zrenjanin, on the opposite side of the Bega river, across the bridge. The planned settlement was to be a Spanish municipality with the town status. Francesco Griselini, Italian naturalist who visited the region in that period, mentioned it as New Barcelona, while a 1740 map of the Banat shows the location of "Neue Stadt Barcellona" (New Town of Barcelona). Captain Kaiser, an engineer, drafted the plan which the Banat Administration forwarded to the Chamber. The plan envisioned houses, fields, meadows, gardens and vineyards. Certain amount of the construction materials was shipped from Austria, the master craftsmen from Vršac were summoned and the building was projected to start in the early October 1737.

== Failure ==
The construction, however, never began in earnest. The Chamber let the project to collapse due to several reasons. In 1737 an Austro-Turkish War broke out and the proximity of the Ottoman threat to the region in general was a negative factor. The settlement also failed because of the advanced age of the settlers, many of them veterans of the administration and the army and the continental climate of the Banat affected the economic viability of the project to locate a city but also severely damaged the health of the settlers.

But the main factor appears to be the outbreak of the Great Plague of 1738. Out of 125 "German" victims of the plague in Pančevo, as New Barcelona wasn't built, in the manifestos there are names like Puniel, Don Visconcio, Puig, Montserrat, Rafael, Serra, Vila, Ibrace, Rosa, Don Castellani, Francesc, etc. Less than a year after the projected start of the new settlement, the Temeswar Administration announced that "due to the bad influence of the climate and the invasion of the mosquitos", the Catalan and Italian pensioners were allowed to move back to Vienna and Buda. By 1740 many exiles had moved out and German colonists, who fled the temporarily Austrian-occupied northern Serbia, moved in the 30 finished houses of the settlement. The year 1740 marked an important milestone for the exiles, with the death of Emperor Charles VI, October 20. His successor, Maria Theresa of Austria, was not bound by oath to the Austracist refugees. By 1740, many exiles had already moved to the cities of Austria-Hungary, especially Buda, Pest and Vienna. Few remaining Catalans were assimilated in time into Germans or Hungarians.

== Legacy ==
Although the Austracist exile left no legacy in the region, it's worth mentioning that Francesc Vilana Perlas i Fàbrega, the son of the Catalan émigré and Marquis of Rialb, Ramon Frederic de Vilana Perlas i Camarasa, was governor of Temeswar from 1753 to 1759. According to Collin Thomas, his name would be the origin of the name of Perlez, a village in the municipality of Zrenjanin.

== Bibliography ==
- Agustí Alcoberro. L’exili austriacista i la Nova Barcelona del Banat de Temesvar: teoria i pràctica, Boletín de la Real Academia de Buenas Letras de Barcelona, ISSN 0210-7481, Nº. 48, 2002, pages. 93-112 (in Catalan)
- Agustí Alcoberro. Sàpiens (Descobreix la teva història) No 67: La nova Barcelona: La ciutat dels exiliats del 1714, Sàpiens Publicacions, Revue, Barcelone, mai 2008 (in Catalan)
- Una bandera turca arraso la Barcelona del Danubio, La Vanguardia, Revue, 18 octobre 1992, page 3 (in Spanish)
- Ernest Lluch, L'alternativa catalana, 1700-1714-1740: Ramon de Vilana Perlas i Juan Amor de Soria : teoria i acció austriacistes, Eumo, 2002 (in Catalan)
- Agusti Alcoberro, L'Exili austriacista (1713-1747), Volum 1, Fundacio Noguera, Textos i Documents 35 (in Catalan)
- Ivan Kukuljević Sakcinski, Nadpisi sredovječni i novojeki na crkvah: javnih i privatnih sgradah i.t.d. u Hrvatskoj i Slavonij, Knjižara Jugosl.akad., 1891 (in Croatian)
