= Orontius of Lecce =

Roman Catholic Saint

Saint Orontius
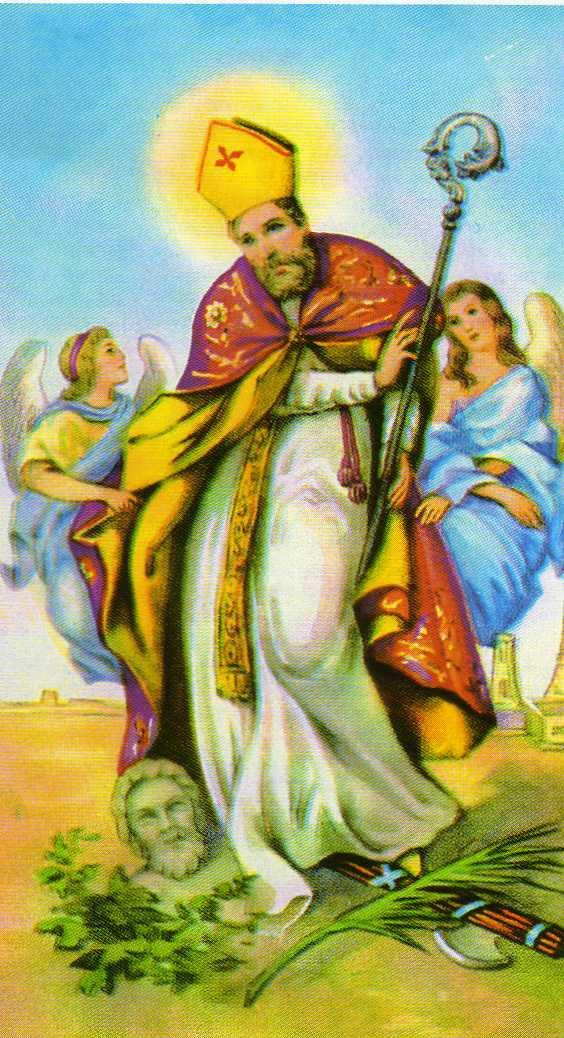
- Venerated in: Catholic Church
- Feast: August 26
- Attributes: Episcopal attire; smashes pagan idols at his feet
- Patronage: Lecce (city and province); Ostuni; Turi

Saint Orontius of Lecce (Italian: Sant'Oronzo, sometimes Oronzio or Aronzo; Leccese: Santu Ronzu) is venerated as a saint by the Catholic Church, along with two other figures associated with his legend, Fortunatus and Justus. He is viewed as the first bishop of Lecce.

== Legend ==
A twelfth-century manuscript records one version of Orontius' legend. Justus was a disciple of Saint Paul who, on his way to Rome, was shipwrecked at Salento, on the beach of San Cataldo. He converted two citizens of Rudiae (present-day Lecce), Orontius and Fortunatus (Orontius was Fortunatus' uncle), to Christianity. Orontius' father, Publius, had been treasurer to the emperor, and Orontius had succeeded him to this office.

Orontius and Fortunatus were denounced as Christians, and they refused to sacrifice to the Roman gods. They were whipped and incarcerated, but later went to Corinth, where Orontius met Saint Paul, and was confirmed as the first bishop of Lecce, and Fortunatus his successor. When they returned to Lecce, they were once again persecuted by the authorities. The representative of Nero, Antoninus, imprisoned Orontius and Fortunatus, threatening to kill them if they did not reject their new religion. The two refused and managed to be released, and continued to preach in the Salento and at Bari. They were finally arrested again by Antoninus and executed with an axe three kilometers from Lecce, on 26 August. Justus was also martyred.

Hagiographer Frederick George Holweck says the account is "unreliable".

== Veneration ==
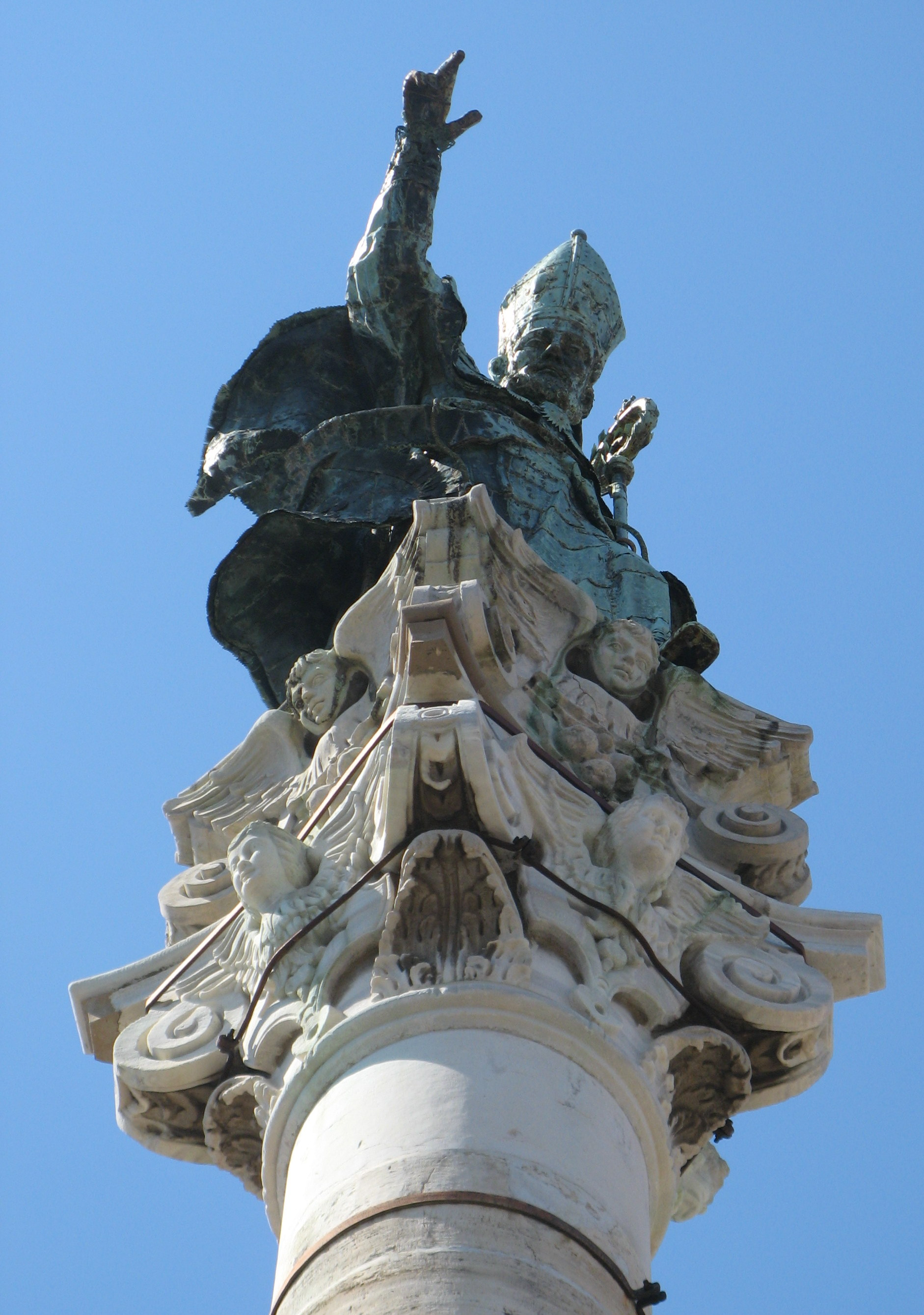
The Colonna di Sant'Oronzo, Lecce (Column of St. Orontius), donated by Brindisi to Lecce

Orontius is the patron saint of Lecce, and is invoked for rain. In 1658, the separate feast days for Orontius, Fortunatus, and Justus were combined into one celebration. Orontius enjoyed a wider cult than the other two saints, and his cult was popular in Salento, Apulia, and Basilicata. Many priests in Ostuni during the sixteenth century were named Rontius, a variant of Orontius. He was identified with the martyr Arontius of Potenza, who is recorded in the Martyrologium Hieronymianum. His cult in Lecce was reinvigorated by the fact that the ending of a plague there in 1656 was attributed to him. A spring of water near Ostuni, considered miraculous, was associated with the cult of Orontius

Orontius is also venerated as the patron saint of the town of Turi. His legend states that he hid in a cave near there. The ending of an outbreak of cholera in 1851 was attributed to him. He is also believed to have hidden in a cave near Ostuni, and was patron saint of that city too, and a church and sanctuary were dedicated to him there, and the procession known as Cavalcata di Sant'Oronzo is still celebrated there. Each year a three-day festival in Ostuni and Lecce is held from the 25 August to 27 August to honor him.

== Sources ==
- Sollerius, Joannes Baptista; Joannes Pinius; Guilielmus Cuperus; et al. (1741). Acta sanctorum Augusti (in Latin). Vol. Tomus V. Antwerp: apud Jacobum Antonium van Gherwen. pp. 764–776.
- Lanzoni, Francesco (1927). Le diocesi d'Italia dalle origini al principio del secolo VII (an. 604) (in Italian). Rome: Biblioteca Apostolica Vaticana. pp. 310–311.
