= Ostuni =

City in Apulia, Italy

- Comune
- Comune di Ostuni
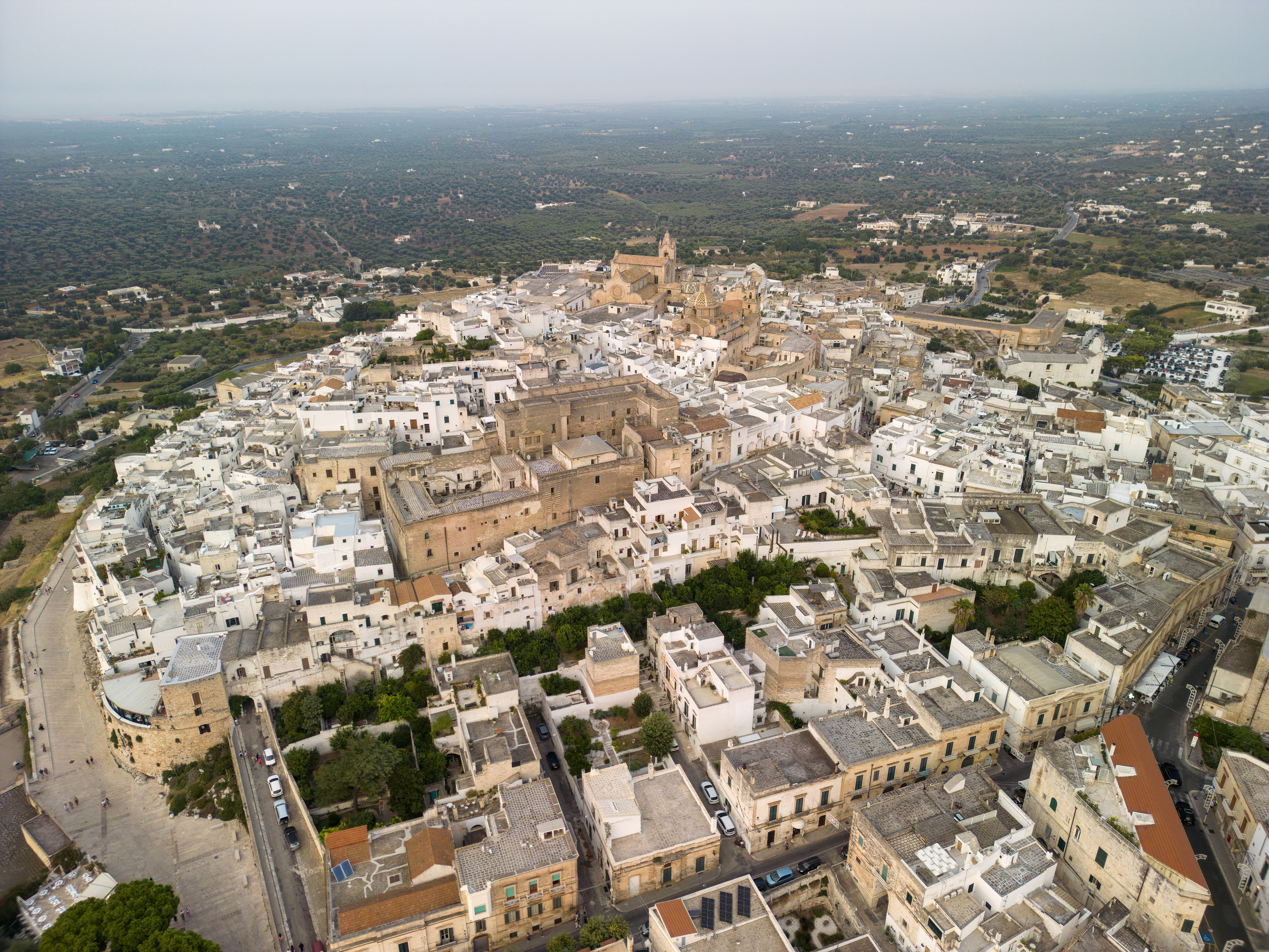
- Panorama of Ostuni

- Coat of arms

- Location within Italy Location within Apulia
- Coordinates: 40°44′N 17°35′E
- Country: Italy
- Region: Apulia
- Province: Brindisi (BR)
- Frazioni: Abate Marchionne, Abate Ventura, Abbadia, Abbadia dell'Olio, Acquarelle, Agnano, Aia Grande, Alberodolce, Badessa, Bagnardi, Barbagianni, Baugli, Bilanciara, Boccadoro, Boezio, Boezio di Sopra, Brancato, Brizido, Brucella, Bugello, Calaprico, Calavetta, Calcagni, Camastra, Camere, Campanile, Campanili-Trinchera, Cannano Andituro, Cannelora, Cantone, Cantrapa, Cappelluzzo, Cappuccini 1, Cappuccini 2, Carella, Carestia, Carlo di Sotto, Carmine, Carmine di Vallegna, Casalini, Casamassima, Casamatrona, Casieddi, Castel Pagano, Caterina, Cavallerizza, Cavallo Stazione, Cavallo Fierro, Certosa, Cervarolo, Cervillo, Cesaresei, Chianchizzo, Chiobbica, Chiobbica Mariedda-Mariello, Cicciariello, Cicerali, Cicerone, Ciminiere, Cimino, Cinera, Ciosso, Citrignano, Citro, Ciurbino, Ciurbo, Ciurbo di Sotto, Cocchiarale, Colagiovanni, Colombo, Concadoro, Concezione, Conella, Conenna, Confergola, Corona, Corvetta, Costa Merlata, Cotugno, Cresimaro, Deserti, Deserto Parco Monsignore, Difesa di Malta, Difesa S.Salvatore, Donna Gnora, I Due Trappeti, Falgherl, Fantese, Fiataturo, Fichera, Fierro, Fiorentino, Fiume Morelli, Foggia di Sauro, Foggiali, Foggianuova, Fogliarelle, Fontanelle, Fonte, Fontenuova, Fontevecchia, Formicola, Fragno, Fumarola, Fuori Fuoco, Galante, Galizia, Garzia, Genovese, Ghiacci, Giancola, Giardino, Giorgetta, Giovannarolla, Giovanniello, Givanni Fasano, Gorgognolo, Grava delle Ciole, Gravina, Gravinella, Greco, Grisiglio, Grotta, Grottone, Grotta Figazzano, Guappi, Guardariello, Impiccato, Impisi, Indelli, Intendente, Isola, La Chiusa, La Fica, La Grotta, La Rascina, La Rosara, Lama dei Peroni, Lama di Maggio, Lamacavallo, Lamacoppa, Lamacornola, Lamaforca, Lamagentile, Lamardilla, Lamasanta, Lamasanta piccola, Lamatroccola, Lamie della Chiesa, Lamiola, Lamiola Piccola, Lapadula, Larascina, Lardagnano, Le Case, Le Gorgole, Le Taveme, Leoci, Lettica, Li Cuti, Li Verani, Libertini, Lo Rizzo, Lo Rizzo Elaiopolio, Locopagliaro, Luogo Freddo, Macchialieto, Madonna della Grata, Magno, Malandrino, Mangiacarta, Mangiamuso, Mangiarizza, Maramondo, Marangia, Marcello, Maresca, Martano, Martellotti, Martucci, Marzio, Maselli, Masseria Colucci, Masseria Fagioulo, Masseria Intelli, Masseria Nuova, Masseria Tutosa, Mastro Francesco, Matiero, Mazzapiecore, Mezzo Prete, Milogna, Minchiullo, Mingucci, Mogale, Molillo, Molino a Vento, Monacelle, Montalbano, Monte, Monte Caruso, Monte La Morte, Monte Michele, Monte Sasso, Monte Torto, Monte Ugenti, Montelarena, Montereale, Monticelli, Monticelli ai Monti, Morone, Morredda, Morrone, Mulino, Musone, Padolecchia, Palombaro, Paolotti, Paracampo, Paradiso, Parco Grande, Parco Paolino, Parco Piccolo, Parco Piccolo Monsignore, Pascarosa, Pecoriello, Pentima la Volpe, Pentone, Peraro, Peschiera, Petardi, Petrono, Pezza Anglani, Pezza Caldaia, Pezza Cruda, Pezza La Spina, Pezze di Ferro, Piatone, Pilone, Pinto, Pioppi, Pisciarulo, Pizzicucco, Polinisso, Porcara, Porta Nova, Portarino, Puntore, Quattropere, Ramunno, Rapida Roscia, Refrigerio, Rialbo, Ricupero, Rienzo, Rodio, Rosa Marina, Salinola, San Benedetto, San Biagio, San Calare, San Domenico, San Eligio, San Giovanni, San Leonardo, San Lorenzo, San Martino, San Paolo, San Paolo Piccolo, San Salvatore, Santa Filomena, Santa Lucia Piccola, Santa Maria La Nuova, Santa Maria La Strada, Santa Nanna, Sant'Andrea, Sant'Angelo, Sant'Antonio, Sant'Antonio Abate, Sant'Arpino, Santavarva, Santo Scalone, Santo Stefano, Santoro, Sant'Oronzo, Santuri, Satia, Scaglione, Scategna, Schiavone, Scopinaro, Sessana, Sessana Grande, Sessana Piccola, Settarte, Solari, Soluco, Sorbole, Spagnulo, Spartacavalluzzo, Specchialieta, Specchiaruzzo, Spennati, Spirito Santo, Stazione, Tamburroni, Tamburroni di Spalluto, Teologo, Tolla, Torre Bianca, Torre Pozzella, Traghetto, Trappeto del Diavolo, Trappeto Trappeto del Monte, Trappeto Nuovo, Trinchera, Urselli, Vadaperto, Valente, Vallegna, Vigna Nuova, Villa Vecchia, Villanova, Zampignola, Zingariello.

Government
  - Mayor: Angelo Pomes (Center-left coalition)

Area
  - Total: 223 km^{2} (86 sq mi)
- Elevation: 207 m (679 ft)

Population (30 September 2025)
  - Total: 29,885
  - Density: 134/km^{2} (347/sq mi)
- Demonym: Ostunesi
- Time zone: UTC+1 (CET)
  - Summer (DST): UTC+2 (CEST)
- Postal code: 72017
- Dialing code: 0831
- Patron saint: Orontius of Lecce
- Saint day: August 26
- Website: Official website

Ostuni (Ostunese: Štunë; Salentino: Štuni) is a city and comune, located about 8 km from the coast, in the province of Brindisi, region of Apulia, Italy. The town has a population of about 30,000 during the winter, but can swell to 200,000 inhabitants during summer, being among the main towns attracting tourists in Apulia. It also has a continuous British and German immigrant community and an industrial zone. The region is a producer of high quality olive oil and wine.

== History ==
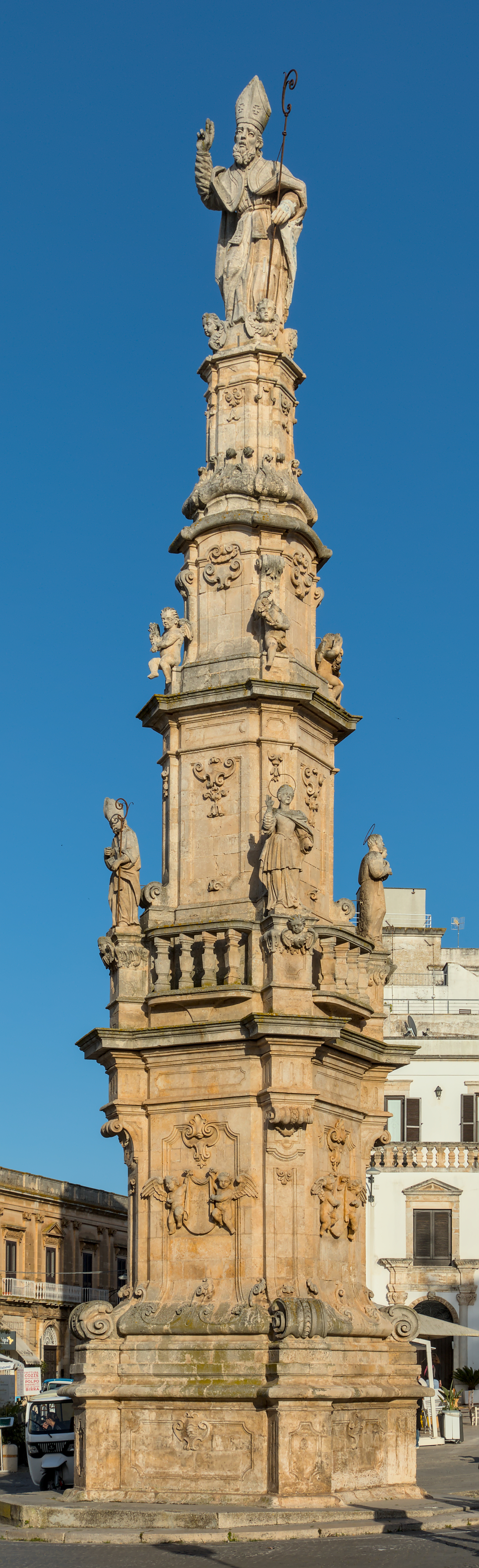
Saint Orontius' column

The region around Ostuni has been inhabited since the Stone Age. The town is reputed to have been originally established by the Messapii, a pre-classic tribe, and was nearly completely destroyed by Hannibal during the Punic Wars. Later it was re-built by the Romans.

Little is also known about the etymology of the name Ostuni. According to one theory, the name could derive from Messapic. Others think it derives from the Greek Astu néon ("new town"). It could derive from the Latin Hostium Unio, which indicates "a group of people of different origins".

Sacked after the fall of the Western Roman Empire, in 996 AD the town became part of the Norman County of Lecce. The Normans built their medieval town around the summit of the hill (229 m), with a castle (only remains can be seen) and city walls with four gates. From 1300 to 1463 it was part of the Principality of Taranto and from 1507 (together with what is now the frazione of Villanova and Grottaglie) passed to Isabella, Duchess of Bari, wife of Gian Galeazzo Sforza, Duke of Milan. Under Isabella's rule, Ostuni thrived during the Italian Renaissance. Isabella protected humanists and people of art and letters, including bishop Giovanni Bovio. She died in 1524 and Ostuni passed as a dowry to her daughter Bona Sforza, wife-to-be of Sigismund I of Poland, King of Poland. During Bona Sforza's government, Ostuni continued to enjoy a stable rule. In 1539 she had towers built along all the shoreline as protection against anticipated attacks from Turks who controlled the Balkans. These towers (still extant, including Pozzella Tower, the Pylon, Villanova and others), were garrisoned and communicated using fiery beacons.

== Main sights ==
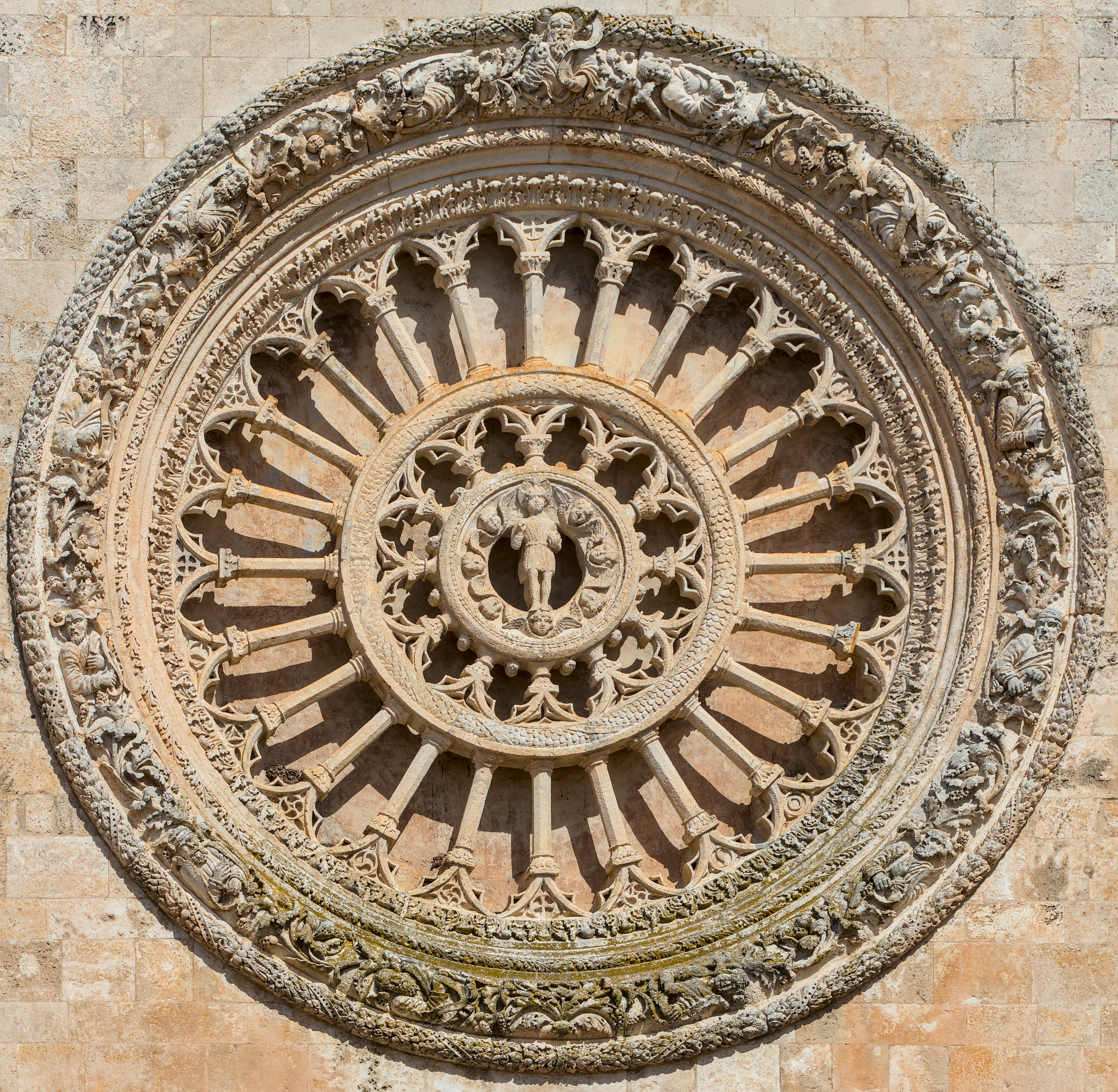
Rose window of Ostuni Cathedral

The "Old Town" is Ostuni's citadel built on top of a hill and still fortified by the ancient walls. Ostuni is commonly referred to as "the White Town" (La Città Bianca in Italian) for its white walls and its typically white-painted architecture. Monuments in their own right, the town's largest buildings are the Ostuni Cathedral and the Bishop's Palace, together with a number of palazzi of local aristocratic families: Aurisicchio, Ayroldi, Bisantizzi, Falghieri, Ghionda, Giovine, Jurleo, Marseglia, Moro, Palmieri, Petrarolo, Sansone, Siccoda, Tanzarella, Urselli and Zaccaria.

In the surrounding countryside there are typical Pugliese "masserie", fortified large estate-farms, one of which, San Domenico, was once held by the Knights of Malta.

== Sport ==
Ostuni has the club Ostuni Calcio 24 (now in Promozione Apulia) that plays in the Stadio comunale "Nino Laveneziana".

== Tourism ==
Ostuni is the fifth city in Italy by percentage of British residents and the first for sale of houses and villas. Starting from 2010, Ostuni and its nearest towns were characterized by so many arrivals from foreign countries, that some local and national newspapers coined a new term, "salentoshire" to describe this phenomenon, taking the term from the useful "chiantishire", taken for the similar phenomenon that has characterized Tuscany some years ago.

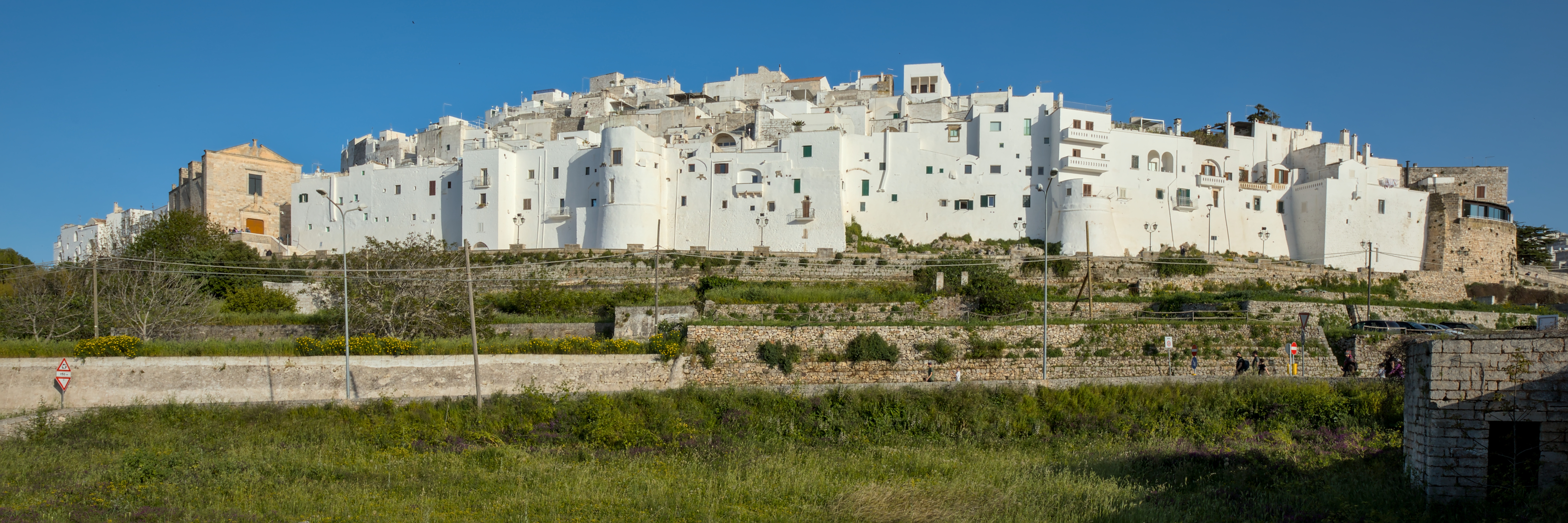
The white walls of Ostuni

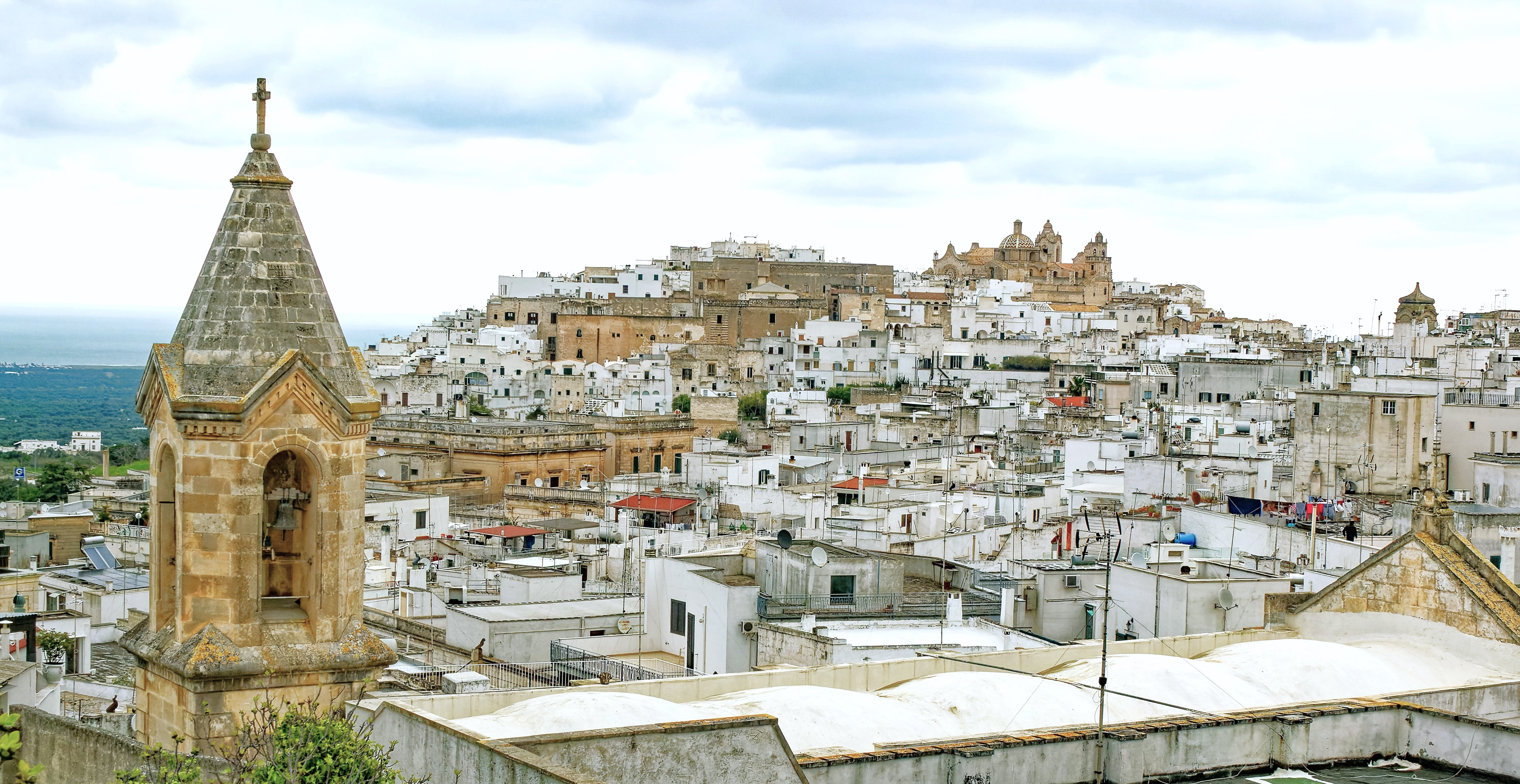
View of Ostuni

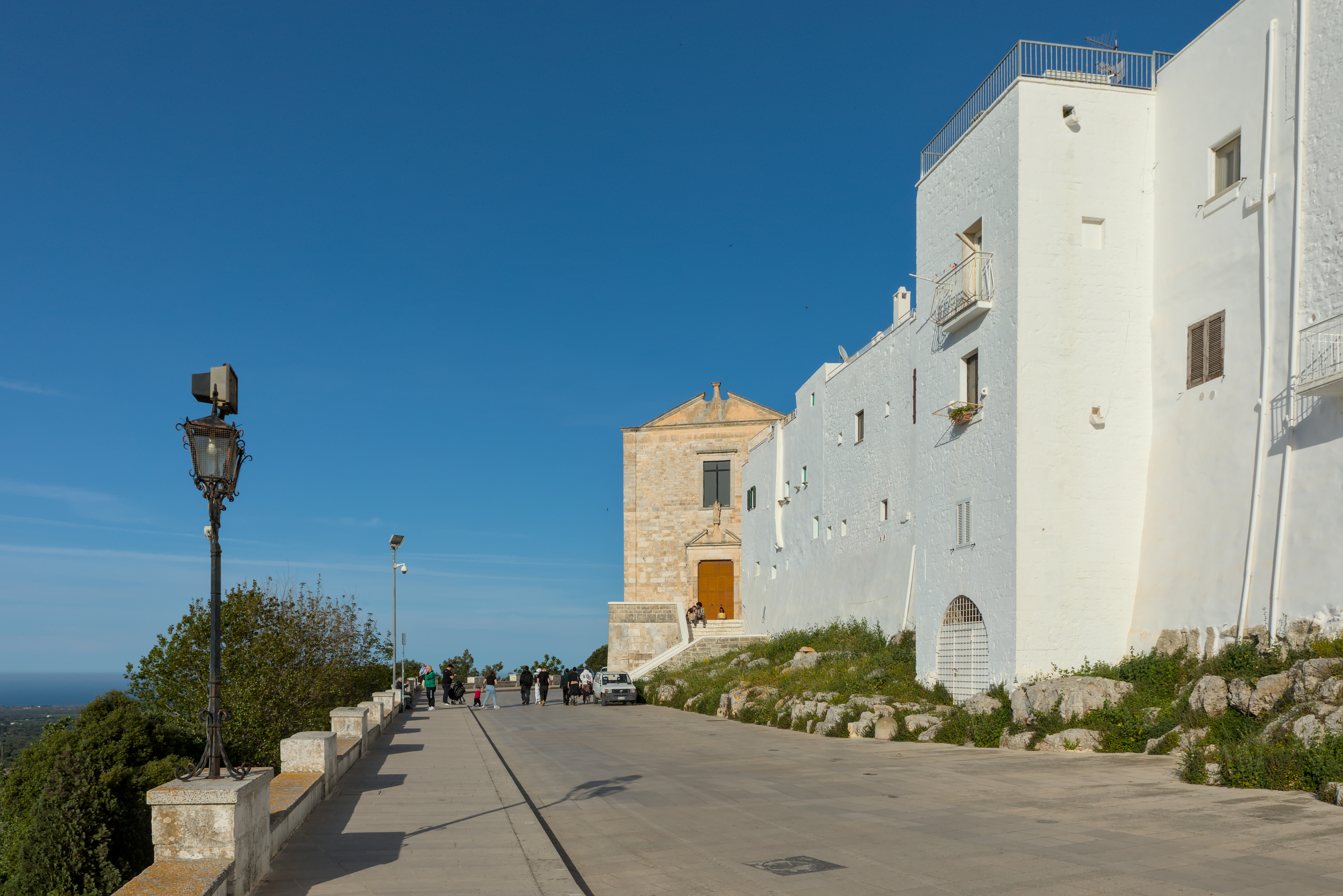
The white walls of Ostuni, with a view towards the Adriatic

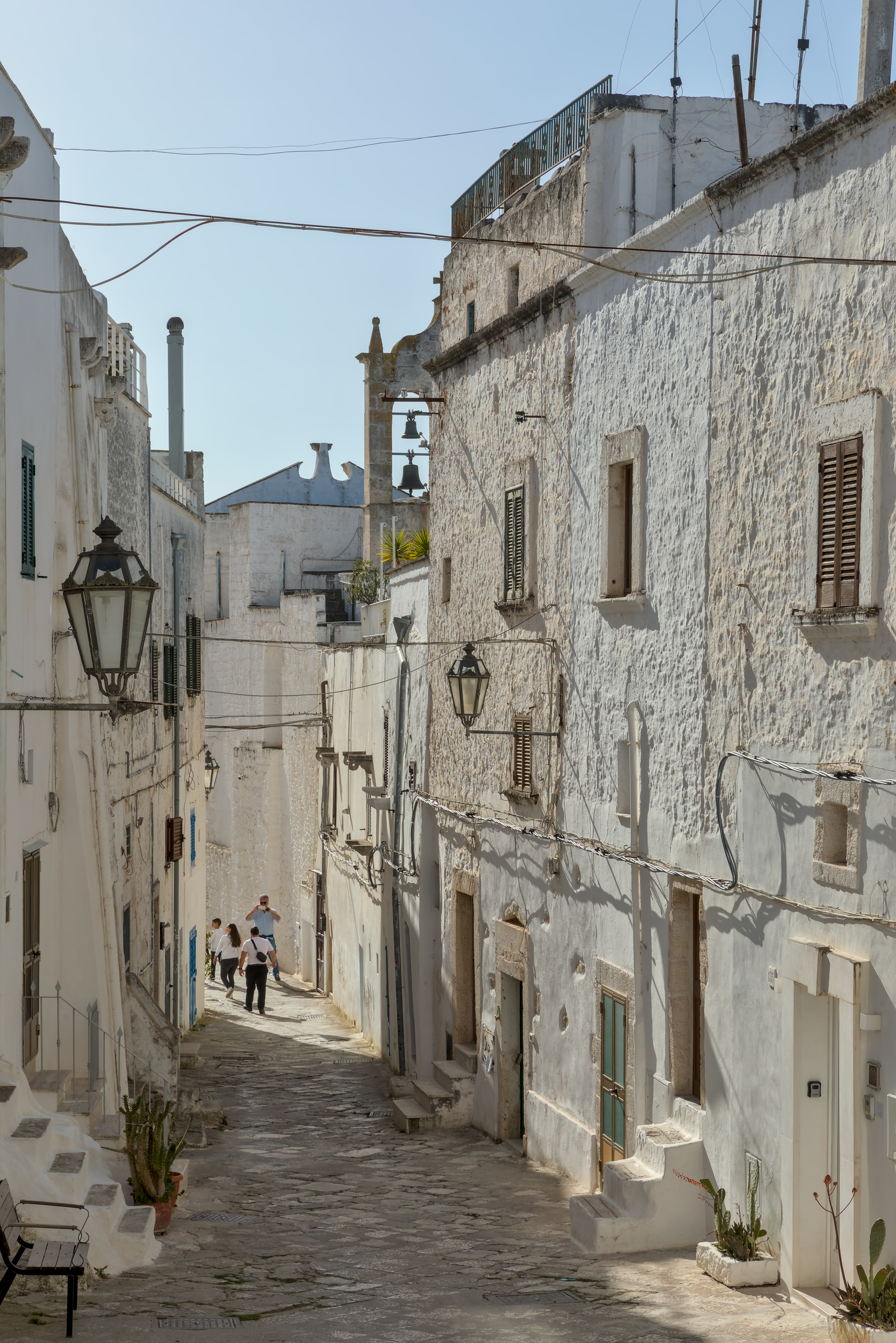
A typical street in the old town

== Transport ==
Ostuni is served by Ostuni railway station. Cotrap buses provide public transport connections between the railway station and the city centre. Ostuni is served by the following nearby airports:

- Bari Airport
- Brindisi Airport

Ostuni is also served by Cotrap and FS Sud Est buses.
