= Authors of Piyyut =

Authors of piyyut are known as paytanim (singular: paytan). Piyyut is Jewish liturgical poetry, in Hebrew or occasionally Aramaic.

The earliest authors of piyyut did not sign their names in acrostics, nor do manuscripts preserve their names. The earliest paytan whose name is known is Yosé ben Yosé, usually dated to fifth-century Palestine; he did not sign his name in his work, but copyists of manuscripts preserved it along with his work. Starting in the sixth century, paytanim began to sign their work.

== Pre-classical Palestine ==
(up to the 5th century CE)

- Yosé bar Yosé—5th-century CE Palestine

== Classical Palestine ==
(6th to mid-8th centuries CE)

- Eleazar ben Qallir (or: ben Qillir)—6th- to 7th-century Palestine
- Joshua the Kohen—7th-century Palestine
- Pinḥas the Kohen, son of Jacob—8th-century Tiberias, Palestine
- Simeon bar Megas the Kohen—6th-century Palestine
- Yannai—6th-century Palestine
- Yoḥanan the Kohen, son of Joshua—7th-century Palestine

== Post-classical Palestine and the Middle East ==
(mid-8th to 15th centuries CE)

- Benjamin ben Judah—late 9th- or 10th-century Middle East, perhaps Iraq
- Saadia Gaon—early to mid-10th-century Iraq
- Shelomo Suleiman al-Sanjāry—9th-century Middle East (Syria?)
- Moses ben Abraham Bali (fl. 1489), Egyptian Karaite physician

== Apulia (Southern Italy) ==
- Amittai ben Shefatya—mid- to late 9th-century Oria

== Lombardy ==
- Solomon Ha-bavli—mid-10th century Lombardy

== Iberian Peninsula - the Spanish period ==
- Dunash ben Labrat—mid- to late 10th-century Iberia
- Judah Halevi (also Yehuda Halevi or ha-Levi; Hebrew: יהודה הלוי; Arabic: يهوذا اللاوي; c. 1075 – 1141)
  - Solomon ibn Gabirol (Hebrew: שלמה בן יהודה אבן גבירול, Shelomo ben Yehuda ibn Gabirol; Arabic: وأيوب سليمان بن يحيى بن جبيرول, Abu Ayyūb Suleiman ibn Yahya ibn Jabirūl), also known as Solomon ben Judah and traditionally known by his Latinized name Avicebron, was an Andalusian poet and Jewish philosopher with a Neoplatonic bent. He was born in Málaga about 1021 and is believed to have died around 1058 in Valencia.
- Solomon ben Judah Ghayyat (fl. 12th century)

== Post-Spanish piyyut ==
- Shlomo ha-Levi Alkabetz author of Lekhah Dodi
- Joseph ben Uri Sheraga (fl. 17th century)
- David Buzaglo, 20th century
