= Ahimaaz ben Paltiel =

Italian poet

- אחימעץ בן פלטיאל
- Born: 1017 CE; Capua
- Died: 1060 CE; Oria

Ahimaaz ben Paltiel (Hebrew: אחימעץ בן פלטיאל; 1017–1060) was a Byzantine Jewish Graeco-Italian liturgical poet (payyetan) and author of a family chronicle. Very little is known about his life. He came from a family some of whose members are well known in Jewish literature as scholars and poets; for example, Shefatya ben Amitai, Hananiel ben Amittai, and his nephew Amittai ben Shephatiah. Ahimaaz had two sons, Paltiel and Samuel. The family tree of this clan is given by Ahimaaz in his Chronicle.

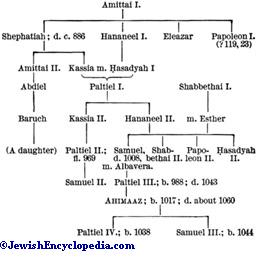
The genealogy of Ahimaaz.

Benjamin of Tudela mentions an Ahimaaz ben Paltiel in Amalfi in southern Italy, in the year 1162 (see his Travels, ed. Asher, i. 13, 14). This may well have been a descendant of his earlier namesake; for it is known that two brothers of the grandfather of Ahimaaz ben Paltiel were sent with presents to Paltiel by the prince of Amalfi. In a list of twenty-two selihah (elegiac) poets (Italy, fifteenth century?), Ahimaaz ben Paltiel is mentioned as the author of two poems, and a Mahzor of the Roman rite attributes to him a selihah for the Fast of Esther.

== Chronicle of Ahimaaz ==
Ahimaaz is best known as the compiler of the Chronicle, composed in 1054, which, though intended merely to glorify his immediate ancestors, gives much important information regarding the history of the early Jewish settlements in such towns as Oria, Bari, Otranto, Gaeta, Benevento, Capua, Amalfi, in southern Italy, and Pavia in northern Italy. Written about one hundred years before Abraham ibn Daud, it covers a period (850–1054) about which little is known; the only information hitherto having been obtained from a few inscriptions and from notices in the works of Shabbetai Donolo, who also was a native of Oria. Only one manuscript of the Chronicle is known to exist; it is in the library of the cathedral at Toledo, Spain. It bears the title Sefer Yuhasin (Book of Genealogies) and is written in rhymed prose in the style of al-Hamadani's maqama, brought into prominence fifty years before Ahimaaz, and which Hariri perfected fifty years after him: the same style that in Hebrew literature was affected by Judah al-Harizi and Immanuel of Rome.

According to the traditions preserved by Ahimaaz, his family had its origin among the captives whom Titus brought to Italy after the destruction of the Temple of Jerusalem by the Romans. The first person he mentions is Amittai of Oria, whom he calls sabbar and payyat, a man versed in Talmudic halakha and a writer of liturgical poetry. The Chronicle describes Aaron of Babylon, the reputed teacher of Kalonymus of Lucca; also through an account by Rabbi Silano additional information is gleaned about the Jewish community of Venosa, some epitaphs from which place had previously been published by G. J. Ascoli.

=== Byzantine atrocities ===
Of the sons of Amittai, the Chronicle dwells especially upon Shefatya, one of the earliest and most prolific liturgical poets (about 850–860), and gives some reliable data on the persecutions which the Byzantine Jews had to suffer under Basil I; on the Saracen invasion of Sicily and Italy (872); on another liturgical poet, Amittai ben Shefatya (son of Shefatya ben Amitai); and on the disputation which Hananiel ben Amittai was forced to hold with the bishop of Oria. The author is obviously proud of the honor done to his family by one of its members, Paltiel, the vizier of al-Muizz and Abd al-Mansur (962–992) of Egypt; perhaps the first of the Egyptian nagids, whom De Goeje has tried to identify with Jauhar al-Rumi or al-Saqlabi. Ahimaaz closes with short accounts of Hananiel, of his son Samuel in Capua, and of Paltiel ben Samuel (988–1048), father of the author himself.

The chronicle describes forcible conversions of the Jews under Basil and Leo V.

The unique manuscript in Toledo bears the name of Menahem ben Benjamin in its signature. It is uncertain whether the word used there, נשלם (finished), refers to the composition or to the copying of the work. This signature is also in rhymed prose; and it seems probable that at least part of page 132 (lines 12–23) in Adolf Neubauer's edition is by Menahem and not by Ahimaaz, for it contains an account of the author in language that one would not expect an author to use of himself.

There is no evidence that Ahimaaz made use of any literary records: he simply gathered together traditions that had been current in his family. In describing the activity of the vizier Paltiel, he refers to the Chronicles of Egypt as containing further data on the subject. Even in this case, it is improbable that he has any individual work in mind. The body of the Chronicle contains no dates: a few are to be found in the last two sections, part of which may be, as stated above, a later addition.

== Popular beliefs and superstitions ==
The Chronicle of Ahimaaz is, however, of interest from another point of view. It is full of accounts of wonderful deeds and of superhuman efforts; and gives an interesting picture of the popular beliefs and superstitions of the author's day. It narrates the exploits of Aaron, who is able to lock up an evil spirit in a chest by means of the Shem (ineffable name of God); how his pupil Shephatiah is able miraculously to cover a great distance in a very short time so as to avoid profaning the Sabbath day; how Shephatiah is able to save the life of a child that two female demons had determined to put to death; how Hananiel is able to bring his cousin to life again; how heaven directly helps the same Hananiel; and how the moon remains obscured for a whole night in order to cover up an error made in an astronomical calculation. The tale is told of the Sefer ha-Merkabah, a wonderful book from which Shephatiah draws his knowledge of heaven's mysteries: before this book a light burned upon the Sabbath day. In order that the book should not fall into the hands of those that were unworthy to use it, it was put into a case of lead and thrown to the waves, which receded perceptibly and carried away the mysterious gift. The power of Paltiel as an astrologer is dwelt upon; it was this power which, in a measure, insured for him the friendship of the conqueror of Egypt. In this Chronicle are also found the first traces of the story of the Wandering Jew. Filled with legends, the Chronicle is of mixed value as a historical source. There is no attempt at historical reconstruction, and the basis upon which Ahimaaz's work rests is family tradition.

The language in which the Chronicle is written bears out this view. In its formation of new nouns and verbs, in its biliteral roots, its peculiar plural endings, and in its use of the construct state, it recalls the style of Donolo and of the liturgical poets of the school of Eleazar Kalir. It also shows the influence of Arabic and the Romance languages. From the rhyme one can also learn the pronunciation of Hebrew in the days of the author. The Chronicle contains a poetical elegy on Paltiel, which has a double alphabetic acrostic, as well as an acrostic upon the full name of the author.
