= Donato Ogliari =

Italian monk and priest (born 1956)

The Right Reverend Donato Ogliari O.S.B.
- Abbot of Saint Paul Outside the Walls
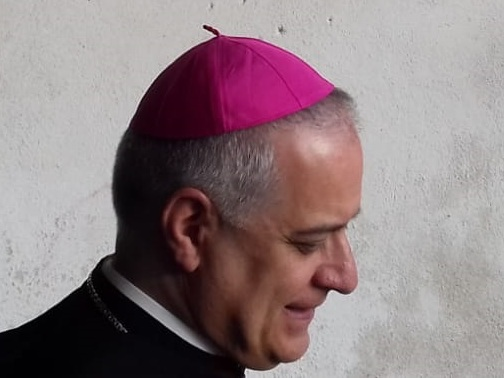
- Ogliari in 2019
- Church: Catholic
- Appointed: 8 June 2022
- Predecessor: Arrigo Miglio
- Previous posts: Abbot of Madonna della Scala, Oria 2006–2014; Abbot ordinary of Monte Cassino 2014–2022

Orders
- Ordination: 3 July 1982

Personal details
- Born: 10 December 1956 (age 69) Erba, Lombardy, Italy
- Education: Katholieke Universiteit Leuven

Donato Ogliari, OSB (born 10 December 1956) is an Italian Catholic prelate who has served as abbot of the Benedictine monastery at Saint Paul outside the Walls since June 2022. He previously served as Abbot of Montecassino from 2014 to 2022, and has been a member of the Dicastery for Bishops since 2022.

== Biography ==
=== Early life ===
Ogliari was born in Erba, Lombardy, Italy on 10 December 1956, and was raised in Asso. According to an interview on TV2000, he had an inclination towards the priesthood from the age of four or five. As a schoolchild in Asso, he encountered a priest of the Consolata Missionaries, who invited him to join the community. He then entered that community as a young man and began priestly formation. During his novitiate with the Consolatas, he encountered a monk who accompanied his class on a spiritual retreat, prompting him to think about the contemplative life. He went on to study philosophy for two years in Turin and theology for three years in London, earning both a Masters of Arts degree in religious studies and his Bachelors of Sacred Theology. On 3 September 1978, he made his first profession as a member of the Consolata Missionaries and was ordained a priest on 3 July 1982. He celebrated his first Mass in Asso, where his family still lives.

=== Priestly ministry ===
Following his ordination, Ogliari served as vice-rector of the minor seminary of Bevera di Castello Brianza and then went on to earn his Licentiate of Sacred Theology and Doctorate of Sacred Theology at the Catholic University of Leuven. In 1987, leaving the Consolata Missionaries, he entered the Benedictine monastery of Praglia Abbey in Padua. In 1988, he served as a translator for English-speakers at the Benedictine General Chapter of that year. Two years later he transferred to the Abbey of the Madonna della Scala in Noci, Bari. In 1992, he professed solemn vows and afterwards became the editor of the magazine "La Scala" from 1990 to 2014, Novice master from 1993 to 1999, and Prior-administrator from 2004 to 2006. In 2006, Ogliari was elected abbot of Madonna Della Scala and blessed as abbot on 7 October of the same year. He served in various administrative roles for both the Subiaco Cassinese Congregation and as vice-president of the Italian Monastic Conference since 2008.

On 23 October 2014, Pope Francis appointed Ogliari as territorial abbot of Monte Cassino Abbey, at the same time limiting its territory to the monastery itself. He was installed as abbot by cardinal Marc Ouellet in November of the same year at the Cathedral of Santa Maria Assunta, becoming the 192nd abbot of Montecassino. In 2015, the Episcopal Conference of Italy appointed him a member of their Commission for Liturgy. In 2018, it was advertised that he was going to bless a monument to deceased soldiers commemorating the Battle of Monte Cassino which included a parachute in an apparent homage to Fallschirmjäger troops of the 1st Parachute Division who died during the battle. Ogliari denied ever receiving such an invitation and stated he would not attend the event, which was eventually cancelled due to controversy.

In June 2022, Pope Francis appointed Ogliari abbot of Saint Paul Outside the Walls, and in July of the same year he was made a member of the Dicastery for Bishops alongside two women, the first to serve on that dicastery. He was selected as one of two speakers for the General Congregation of Cardinals for the 2025 papal conclave along with Raniero Cantalamessa. He spoke on Monday, 28 April and reflected on the needs of the church as they apply to the upcoming conclave, as well as the importance of synodality. He is fluent in English, Flemish, and his native Italian. Ogliari also writes on spiritual and theological topics, having published numerous articles and books.
