= Amittai ben Shephatiah =

10th-century Italian Jewish liturgical poet

Amittai ben Shephatiah (Hebrew: אמיתי בן שפטיה) was an Italian-Jewish Hebrew-language liturgical poet who flourished at Oria, Italy, in the beginning of the tenth century. His compositions occupy an important place in the selichot liturgy. His father was Shefatya ben Amitai.

Rabbeinu Tam (died 1171) cites one of his piyyutim (אשנבי שחקים; Yevamot 16b; Tosafot sv פסוק); and Joseph ha-Kohen mentions him as one of the early poets, but without giving any further details ("Emek haBaka," ed. Letteris, page 19, Kraków, 1895). According to Zunz and Landshuth, he lived after the persecutions of the first Crusade (1096). The only reliable information in regard to the personality of Amittai, however, is to be found in the "Chronicle of Ahimaaz," which states that he was the son of Shephatiah, who died toward the end of the ninth century, and the grandson of that Amittai with whom the "Chronicle" commences. Few details of his family life are given. He had a sister Kassia, who married her cousin Hasadyah; and it is said that Amittai composed a liturgical piece in honor of the wedding. He sometimes gave a public recitation of his elegies; and once, while thus officiating at a funeral, he took offense at the action of a brother of the deceased, a certain Moses, whom Kaufmann supposes to be Moses of Pavia. He was subsequently placed under the ban because of testimony which he had offered touching the morals of a woman.

Amittai was a most prolific poet. Zunz enumerates as many as twenty-four liturgical pieces written by him, among which is the yoẓer for a nuptial Sabbath commencing אדון מגיד מראשית אחרית. He makes use of the Midrash, and in one piyyut versifies a piece of the Mekhilta. At other times he has references to historical events; e.g., in אהבתיך אהבה כלולה, where he mentions the forced conversion of Jewish children. In the selichah למה ה' תעמוד מרחוק, the date 1096 occurs; but for other than chronological reasons, Zunz suspects that the verse is a later insertion. One of his selichot (אזכרה אלהים ואהמיה) still forms part of the Ne'ila service of the Day of Atonement.
