= Shefatya ben Amitai =

9th-century Italian rabbi and Hebrew-language liturgical poet

Rabbi Shefatya ben Amitai (lit. Shefatya the son of Amitai; died 885 or 886) was a Hebrew-language liturgical poet.

== Biography ==
Born in Italy, he lived in Oria, Apulia, southern Italy. In the Chronicle of Ahimaaz it is reported that he traveled to Constantinople to treat the daughter of the Byzantine emperor Basil I who was reportedly possessed by a demon. As a reward for performing this legendary deed, the emperor promised to fulfil Shefatya's wish. Shefatya then pleaded for the annulment of the decree of the forced conversion of the Jews of Italy or, if not from all of Italy, then at least the Jews of Oria should be spared. The emperor agreed to this request. This is purported to have occurred c. 873.

Shefatya died in the year AM 4646 (885/886). His son was Amittai ben Shephatiah.

== Liturgical works ==
His only known liturgical poem is Yisrael Nosha which according to the Ashkenazi tradition is included in the closing service on Yom Kippur (the Day of Atonement).
