= Haim Zafrani =

Moroccan historian and philologist (1922–2004)

Haim Zafrani

Haim Zafrani (Arabic : حاييم زعفراني), 10 June 1922 in Essaouira – 31 March 2004), was a Moroccan-born French scholar and writer.

Zafrani is particularly noted for having collected and preserved much of the music and oral poetry of the Jews of Morocco. He recorded, and thereby preserved, the melodies of Rabbi David Buzaglo (1903–1975), widely acclaimed as the greatest paytan (author of Jewish liturgical poem) of his time.

Zafrani was also a leading scholar on the history of the Jews of Morocco. His best-known book is 2000 Years of Jewish Life in Morocco (translated from French and published in an English edition).

Zafrani began his career as a teacher and became a school inspector in charge of the teaching of Arabic in the Alliance Israélite Universelle schools in Morocco. Later, Zafrani moved to Paris, France, where he was a professor and head of the Department of Hebrew language and Jewish civilization at the University of Paris. He was member of the Institut des Hautes Etudes Semitiques of the Collège de France, of the Academy of the Kingdom of Morocco, and a Fellow of the Institute for Advanced Studies of the Hebrew University of Jerusalem. He was awarded the Irving and Bertha Neuman Distinguished Scholar Award, (1982–1983), the Yad Yitzhak Ben-Zvi prize (1985), the Grand Atlas prize (1999), and the Prize of Maghreb (2001).

Zafrani wrote fifteen books and more than a hundred articles covering Jewish culture, languages, and literature in the Muslim countries of North Africa, especially Morocco, as well as the history of the Jews in Muslim Spain.

== Le Prix Haïm Zafrani ==
Le Prix Haïm Zafrani is a prize given to creators of works of literary, scientific or artistic merit by the Institut Universitaire Elie Wiesel.

== Bibliography ==
- ZAFRANI, Haim. Two thousand years of Jewish life in Morocco. (English translation). Hoboken, N.J.: Ktav Pub. House, 2002
- ZAFRANI, Haim. Deux mille ans de vie juive au Maroc: histoire et culture, religion et magie. Pp. 325, ill. Paris: Maisonneuve & Larose; [Casablanca]: Eddif, c1998
- ZAFRANI, Haim. L'Ecclésiaste et son commentaire: "le livre de l'ascèse": la version arabe de la Bible de Sa'adya Gaon. (with André Caquot). Pp. 132. Paris: Maisonneuve & Larose, c1989
- ZAFRANI, Haim. Juifs d'Andalousie et du Maghreb. Pp. 437, ill. [Paris]: Maisonneuve et Larose, c1996.
- ZAFRANI, Haim. Pédagogie juive en terre d'Islam; l'enseignement traditionnel de l'hébreu et du judaïsme au Maroc. Pp. 191. Paris: A. Maisonneuve, 1969
- ZAFRANI, Haim. Études et recherches sur la vie intellectuelle juive au Maroc de la fin du 15e au début du 20e siècle. V. 1–3. Paris: Geuthner [1972-<c1980]
- ZAFRANI, Haim. Éthique et mystique: judaïsme en terre d'Islam: le commentaire kabbalistique du "Traite des Peres" de J. Bu-'Ifergan. Pp. 260. Paris: Editions Maisonneuve & Larose, 1991
- ZAFRANI, Haim. Kabbale, vie mystique et magie: judaïsme d'Occident musulman. Pp. 487, ill. Paris: Maisonneuve & Larose, 1986
- ZAFRANI, Haim. Recherches sur les juifs du Maghreb. Pp. 177, 44. Paris: Institut européen d'études hébraïques, Université de Paris VIII: [Berit `Ivrit `olamit], 1997
