= David Buzaglo =

Moroccan-Israeli liturgical poet (1903–1975)

David Buzaglo, 1966

Rabbi David Buzaglo (1903–1975) was a Moroccan-Israeli paytan (poet, composer, performer) and teacher of Jewish liturgical hymns in the Moroccan Jewish tradition. His work articulated a religious-poetic approach to Zionism, employing traditional Jewish metaphors and differing from both secular Zionism and mainstream religious Zionism.

== Early life and education ==
Buzaglo was born in Zawia, Morocco. He became an orphan at an early age and was raised by his grandparents. He was sent to Marrakesh to study under Rabbi Hain Attar, a prominent religious poet and singer. At age 16 he moved with his family to Casablanca, finishing his Torah studies and continued learning the tradition of Hebrew poetry. He was felt to be a prodigy, "great in both Torah and poetry."

== Casablanca ==
In Casablanca he learned the Andalusian music style from Arab musicians and developed a unique blend that combined local music styles with Jewish religious hymns. In addition to being a cantor, he was a teacher of the tradition of piyyut (Jewish liturgical poetry), and wrote over 100 piyyuts. He was popular with both pious and bohemian circles, and his performances attracted Jewish and Arab audiences alike. He was frequently engaged for celebrations and prayer events. For those events outside the Jewish world, he was accompanied by Arab musicians. Because of Morocco's distance from Israel, Morocco was able to preserve and produce "a culture of poetry without any expression in the Israeli center," blending traditional Andalusian music with religious poetry.

During the 1920s, a Hebrew-language cultural revival took place in Morocco, in which Buzaglo played an active role. By 1923 he taught at the local Société Mogen David, an organization dedicated to the promotion of Zionism and dissemination of Hebrew and served as its secretary. This did present a challenge for him, as Zionism had been outlawed in Morocco and was opposed by elements of the conservative Jewry of the city. He participated in Hebrew publishing, proofreading and editing Hebrew books.

In the 1940s his health deteriorated. He became blind in 1949 and had chronic bronchitis. He became secluded and largely paid attention to only religious matters. He was not a part of the massive immigration to Israel in the 1950s. He acknowledged being afraid of being unemployed in an unknown foreign setting; he was unaware of the support he would have from his community. He emigrated to Israel in 1965.

== Israel ==
Upon arriving in Israel, he was welcomed by the Moroccan community as a "cultural messiah." He encountered Moroccan Jewish communities that were experiencing a loss of socio-cultural cohesion. Buzaglo traveled between development towns and urban neighborhoods, working with these communities through liturgical poetry and teaching. He lived in Bat Yam, and played a central role in the cultural reconstruction of the Moroccan Jewish experience. Buzaglo has been singled out as the figure who revived and helped perpetuate the Moroccan baqqashot tradition. In Israel he had his most productive period. He did not see himself as a poet, and he did not write down his poems or publish his work. He did not allow recordings of his voice, and little of him can now be heard. He believed in only oral transmission of work. "Let oblivion erase them," he believed.

He was critical of the Israeli ethos, particularly relating to the Arab-Israeli conflict. Buzaglo viewed Israel through traditional Jewish concepts of redemption, challenging both the religious Zionist and the "hegemonic Sabra ethos." His poetry gives an alternative look at the "religious relationship to the land of Israel, the Arabs, the religious interpretations of historical events, and the self-image and character of the Israeli Jew." He preached against quarrel and war, and called for peace. He was deeply affected by the 1973 Yom Kippur War, and his health further deteriorated. He died in 1975.

== Legacy ==
Buzaglo initiated a Sephardic shift in liturgical writing, creating a link between the Spanish Jewry's Golden Era and modernity. Cities with a street that bear his name are Kiryat Yam, Yeruham, Ashkelon, Sderot, Hadera, Ashdod and Ofakim. In 2015, a documentary film was released called "Song of Loves-Rabbi David Buzaglo."

== Personal ==
His son is philosophy professor Meir Buzaglo.
