= San Francesco d'Assisi, Oria =

Church building in Oria, Italy

Coordinates: 40.5003°N 17.6458°E

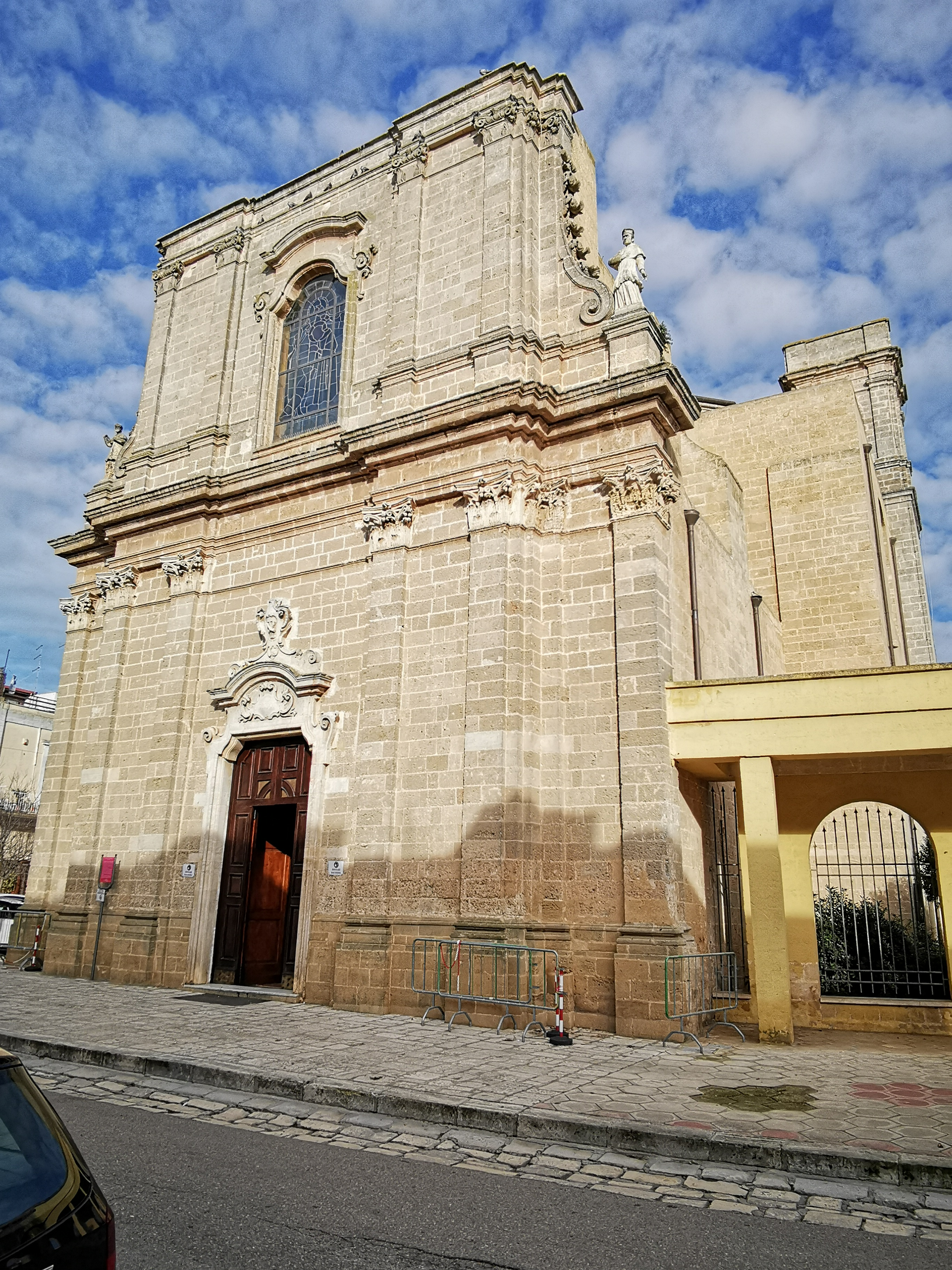

San Francesco d'Assisi is a baroque-style, former Roman Catholic church located in the town of Oria, province of Brindisi, Apulia, Italy.

== History ==
The church was erected of acquired shortly after a visit by St Francis himself. It appears to have been a small church dedicated to the Madonna di Costantinopoli, and officiated by the Basilian monks. In 1219, a Franciscan order convent was erected alongside. The interior houses the relics of the Blessed Francesco da Durazzo and a statue of the Pietà litica once housed in the rural church of the Madonna di Gallana.
