= Theodosius of Oria =

Italian bishop and saint

Saint Theodosius of Oria
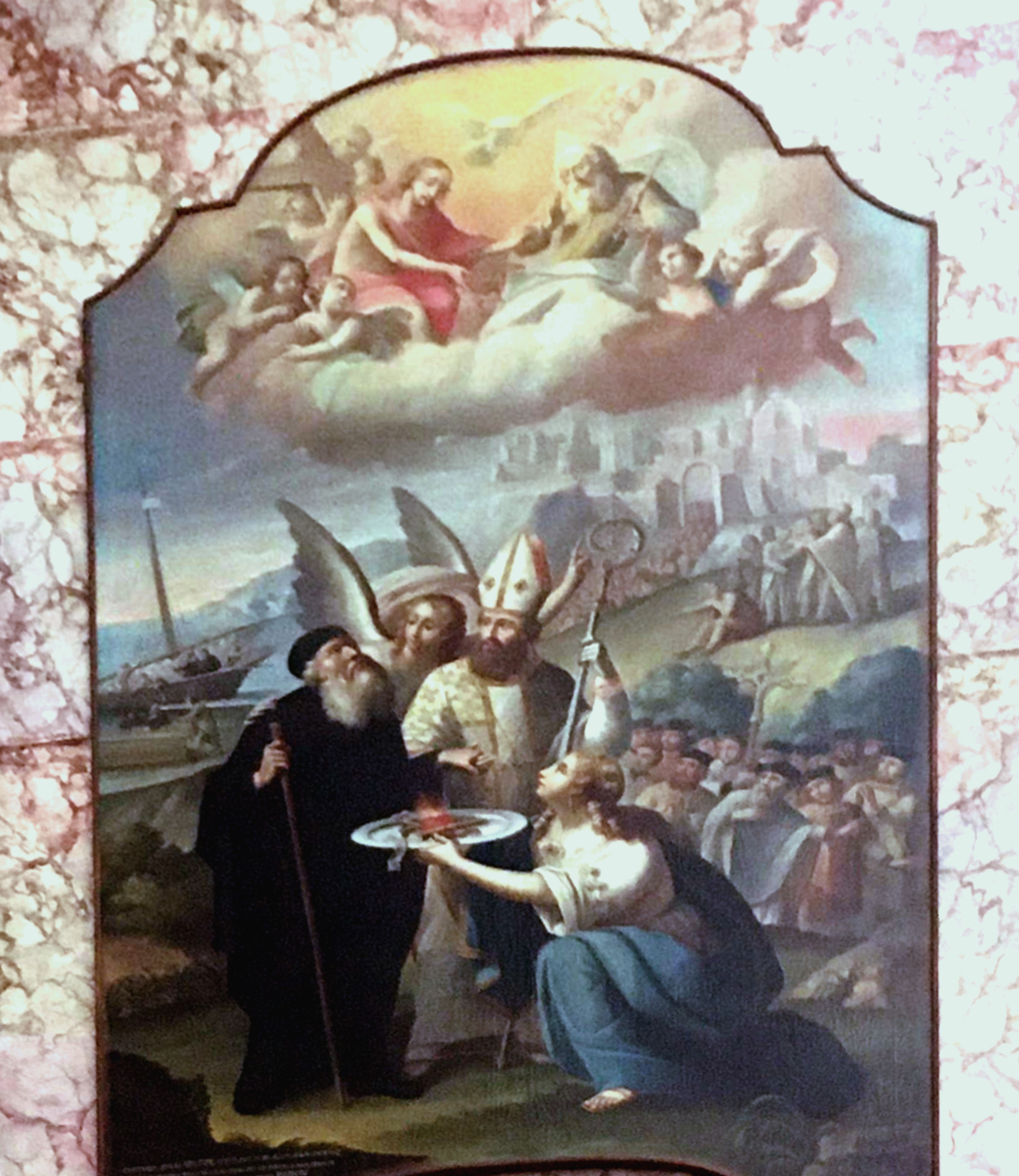
- Painting by Samuele Tatulli depicting the arrival in Ostuni of the relics of Saint Barsanuphius. The three characters in the foreground are (from left to right) the saint, Bishop Theodosius, and the personified diocese of Oria.

Bishop of Brindisi and Oria
- Died: late 9th century
- Venerated in: Catholic Church
- Major shrine: Oria
- Feast: August 30
- Patronage: Oria

Theodosius of Oria (Italian: Teodosio di Oria) was a 9th-century bishop and papal legate. He is venerated as a saint by the Catholic Church on August 30.

== Biography ==
Theodosius is thought to have been educated in Oria by Eastern hermits and monks and may have been a courtier at the Imperial Court of Constantinople. It has been suggested that he was Roman or Neapolitan due to his name. Oria was at the time an important stronghold of the Byzantine Empire, as it protected the hinterland of Otranto, which was the only Byzantine port in Italy at that time. Due to its relative security, the bishopric of Brindisi was moved to Oria around the time of the Arab conquest of Brindisi in 838. Though the town of Oria was under Byzantine rule, the bishopric followed the Roman Rite.

At some point, Theodosius became bishop of Brindisi and Oria, possibly appointed by the Pope after the end of the Muslim occupation. Theodosius acted as a mediator in the conflicts between the Byzantines and the Lombards and between the Eastern and Western churches. He was sent in 884 as apocrisiarius by Pope Hadrian III to Constantinople to convey a synodal letter to patriarch Photius about faith and the filioque. Theodosius seems to have come back while Hadrian was still alive, with many riches and likely a communication from emperor Basil I, for which he was thanked by Pope Stephen V. As a reward, he received some relics of Chrysanthus and Daria for whom he erected a church that might have been the predecessor of the current cathedral.

In 887, he convened a local synod in which he reminded, among other things, his priests to remain celibate, possibly in contrast to the Greek priests in neighboring regions. The acts of the synod show, in general, that the local clergy remained Latin and Roman.

Around the same time, he deposited the relics of St Barsanuphius, a Gazan hermit, in a chapel he built close to the porta Hebraica. There is a didactic inscription in the crypt of the church of San Francesco da Paola that mentions the event, which was later built on top of the chapel.

His pastoral and building activity were concentrated in Oria. He was also successful in obtaining the relics of Saint Leucius of Brindisi, the founder of the diocese of Brindisi, back from Benevento as a gift from its bishop. Theodosius built a basilica dedicated to these relics, which was located above the original martyrium. The basilica was demolished in the 18th century.

=== Chronicle of Ahimaaz ===
Ahimaaz ben Paltiel wrote in the Chronicle of Ahimaaz that Theodosius wagered one of his ancestors about when the new moon would appear and claimed that although Theodosius had calculated the date correctly, God intervened to have Ahimaaz's ancestor win.

== Veneration ==
Theodosius was considered a patron of his city for his diplomatic and building activity, and his deeds were perpetuated in local history and tradition, similar to other bishops at the time such as Donatus of Zadar. Theodosius' veneration date is August 30.
