= Baraita of Samuel =

A Baraita of Samuel (Hebrew: בריתא דרבי שמואל) was known to Jewish scholars from Shabbethai Donolo in the 10th century to Simon Duran in the 15th century, and citations from it were made by them. It was considered lost until around 1861, when it unexpectedly appeared in print.

== Contents ==
In its present form, the Baraita is composed of nine chapters, treating astronomy and astrology. The first chapter deals with the form of heaven, of Orion, of the Pleiades, of Draco, and of the planets and their light. The second and third treat of the movements of the moon and the course of the Zodiac. At the same time directions are given for adjusting the gnomon of a sun-dial. The fourth defines the character of the seasons and the planets; the fifth, the orbits of the planets. Directions are given for calculating Molad and Teḳufah. The sixth imparts the teachings of the Egyptian sages on the original position of the planets and the division of the Zodiac. The seventh chapter mentions the exact distances of the planets from the Earth: the moon is considered the nearest; Saturn, the most distant. The eighth chapter deals with the altitudes of the planets. The ninth chapter explores how celestial bodies affect events on Earth. It is conceded that "the planets in themselves can not make for good or evil, unless empowered by God."

Steinschneider correctly characterizes the Baraita as somewhat fantastic in its conception of the construction of the world, containing Talmudic elements, but uninfluenced by Greco-Arabic science. Its unscientific, half-mystic tendency caused it to be thrust aside in the Orient through the rising Arabic science, while in Europe, especially in France and Germany, it was regarded with special respect. From constituents of the Baraita joined with various elements of mysticism originated the kabbalistic cosmography, first presented by the Book of Raziel, and which appears in later works influenced by the latter.

== Authorship ==
Older scholars considered the author of the Baraita to be the amora Samuel of Nehardea, who, according to the statements in the Talmud, was a great astronomer (it is doubtful whether Kuzari [4:29] refers to an actual astronomical work of Samuel, or to his astronomical knowledge). The newer editions have Shmuel ha-Katan as the author. This is hardly based on a tradition, but rather is due to a combination of the name "Samuel" with Shmuel ha-Katan, who is mentioned as possessing knowledge of the Ibbur. These suggestions of names have no material value. The very contents and language of the Baraita contradict the assumption that it is the work of amoraim or tannaim. Moreover, chapter 5 designates the year 4536 (=776 C.E.) as the one which, with but a slight difference, resembles the year of the Creation. The courses of the sun and moon, leap-years, and Teḳufah will repeat themselves, and calculations must begin anew from this year.

The earliest date, then, at which the Baraita could have been written is 776. It is more difficult to determine the latest date. This question is connected with that of the relationship of the Baraita to the Pirkei de-Rabbi Eliezer (PdRE). Some have endeavored to conclude, from citations of the Baraita by Abraham ben Ḥiyyah and Judah ha-Levi, that the Baraita and PdRE originally formed one work. The portions of the Baraita now existing prove clearly that the two are fundamentally different; neither diction, subject, character, nor aim of the two works bearing any resemblance. There is distinct kinship between the two astronomic chapters of PdRE (6 and 7) and the Baraita of Samuel; but it cannot be decided which author borrowed from the other. In fact, there may have been a third source from which both drew. Zunz supposes that the astronomic chapters in PdRE originally had a slightly varying form from that of the Baraita, and that portions from each found their way into the other. This would explain how Abraham b. Ḥiyyah came to designate a Baraita as being the work of Samuel and R. Eliezer. It is certain, however, that all that is known at present (as of 1906) consists of fragments of the Samuel Baraita.
