= San Giovanni Battista, Oria =

Former church in Oria, Apulia, Italy

San Giovanni Battista
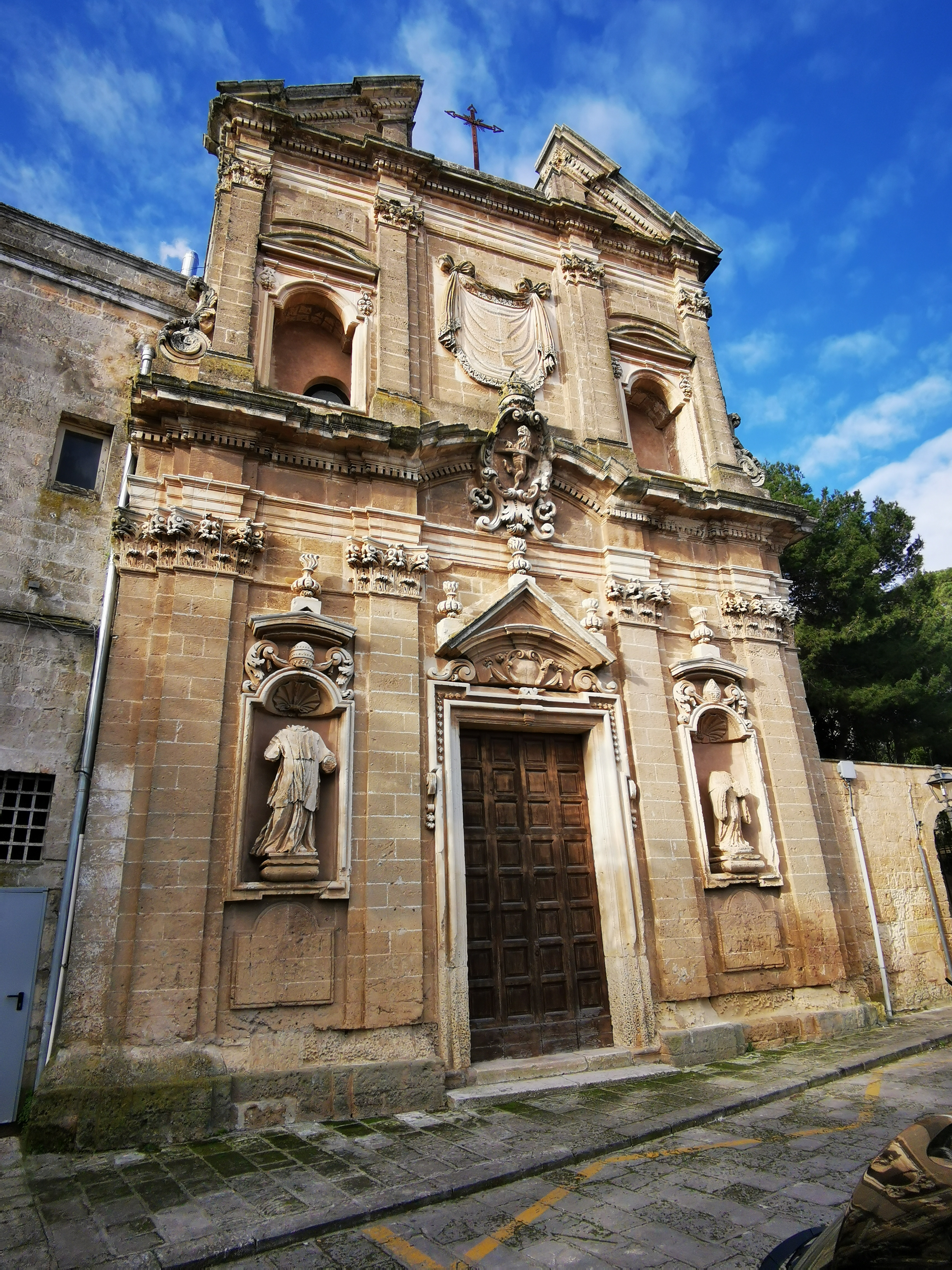
- Facade of the church
- San Giovanni Battista
- 40°29′56.9″N 17°38′33.8″E
- Location: Oria, Apulia
- Country: Italy
- Denomination: Roman Catholic

History
- Status: Church
- Founded: 14th century
- Dedication: Saint John the Baptist

Architecture
- Functional status: Preserved
- Style: Baroque

Administration
- Province: Taranto
- Archdiocese: Oria

San Giovanni Battista is a baroque-style, former Roman Catholic church located in the town of Oria, province of Brindisi, Apulia, Italy.

== History ==
A Romanesque-style church was erected at the site prior to the 14th century under the patronage of baronessa Filippa di Cosenza. In the 17th century, the Celestine order built a larger baroque church around this core. In the 19th century the Convent was torn down to erect the Elementary School dedicated to Edmondo De Amicis. The church is presently deconsecrated and used for cultural events.
