= Fatimid sack of Oria =

Sack of 925

Sack of Oria (925)
- Part of the Arab–Byzantine wars and the Muslim conquest of Sicily
- Map of the Arab–Byzantine naval conflict in the Mediterranean, 7th–11th centuries
| Date | 9 July 925 |
| Location | Oria, Apulia, Italy |
| Result | Fatimid victory |

Belligerents
| Fatimid Caliphate | Byzantine Empire |

Commanders and leaders
| Abu Ahmad Ja'far bin 'Ubayd | Strategos of Oria (POW) |

Strength
| Unknown | Unknown |

Casualties and losses
| Unknown | 6,000 killed 10,000 enslaved |

The Sack of Oria was the capture and subsequent sack of the Byzantine city of Oria by the Fatimid army in the year 925, led by Abu Ahmad Ja'far bin 'Ubayd, the chamberlain of the Caliph.

== Sack ==
In the winter of 924, the Fatimid caliph Abd Allah al-Mahdi Billah dispatched an expedition to Italy with a powerful army. The leader of the expedition was the Fatimid chamberlain Abu Ahmad Ja'far bin 'Ubayd. The Fatimid force spent the winter in Sicily, and in the spring of the next year, they invaded Calabria and landed near Taranto. There the Fatimid forces began capturing many fortresses, including Bruzzano Zeffirio. The Fatimids afterwards began marching to the city of Oria in Apulia. The Byzantine forces of Calabria had retreated to Oria and protected the population of a large tract of country and had sustained an assent or at least shown face to the enemy in the assault. According to the historian Ibn 'Idhari, the Fatimids defeated the Byzantines and killed 6,000 of their fighters. The Fatimids captured and sacked Oria on July 9th. 10,000 people were enslaved; among them was the patrician of the city who managed to ransom himself for 5,000 gold mithkals, or 72,000 Italian lira. Among the notable ones who were captured was Shabbethai Donnolo, who, with many other Jews, was taken to Taranto and ransomed there.

== Aftermath ==
After his successes, Ja'far departed on July 24, 925, for Sicily, from where he returned with a rich booty to al-Mahdiya in North Africa, where the captives were put up for sale. The sack of Oria resulted in a truce with the Byzantines in Calabria, likely concluded at Taranto, with harsh terms imposed on them: the Fatimids received the governor of Calabria and Leo, a Sicilian bishop, as hostages to secure the tribute payment.

== Sources ==
- Alexander Vasiliev (1968), Byzantium and the Arabs, Vol. 2: Political relations between Byzantines and Arabs during the Macedonian Dynasty (In French).
- Michele Amari (1854), Storia dei Musulmani di Sicilia, Vol II (in Italian).
- Steven Runciman (1988), The Emperor Romanus Lecapenus and his reign : a study of tenth-century Byzantium.
