= Moses ben Abraham Bali =

15th century Karaite physician, poet and ḥakham

Moses ben Abraham Bali (fl. late 15th century) was a Karaite physician, poet and ḥakham from Cairo. Two collections of his Hebrew poetry are found in the collection of Abraham Firkovich now in Saint-Petersburg. The earlier, Sefer Zeraḥ (1489), contains 224 piyyutim on the weekly lessons. The later, Taḥkemoni, contains 237 piyyutim for the Sabbath and other holidays. There are also liturgical poems ascribed to Moses ben Abraham Darʿī that are in fact by Bali.

== Bibliography ==
- Kohler, Kaufmann; Broydé, Isaac (1902). "Bali, Moses ben Abraham". In Singer, Isidore; et al. (eds.). The Jewish Encyclopedia. Vol. 2. New York: Funk & Wagnalls. p. 473.
- Markon, Isaak Dov Ber (2007). "Moses ben Abraham of Pontoise". In Berenbaum, Michael; Skolnik, Fred (eds.). Encyclopaedia Judaica. Vol. 3 (2nd ed.). Detroit: Macmillan Reference USA. p. 90. ISBN 978-0-02-866097-4.
