= San Domenico, Oria =

Church building in Oria, Italy

Coordinates: 40.49638°N 17.64552°E

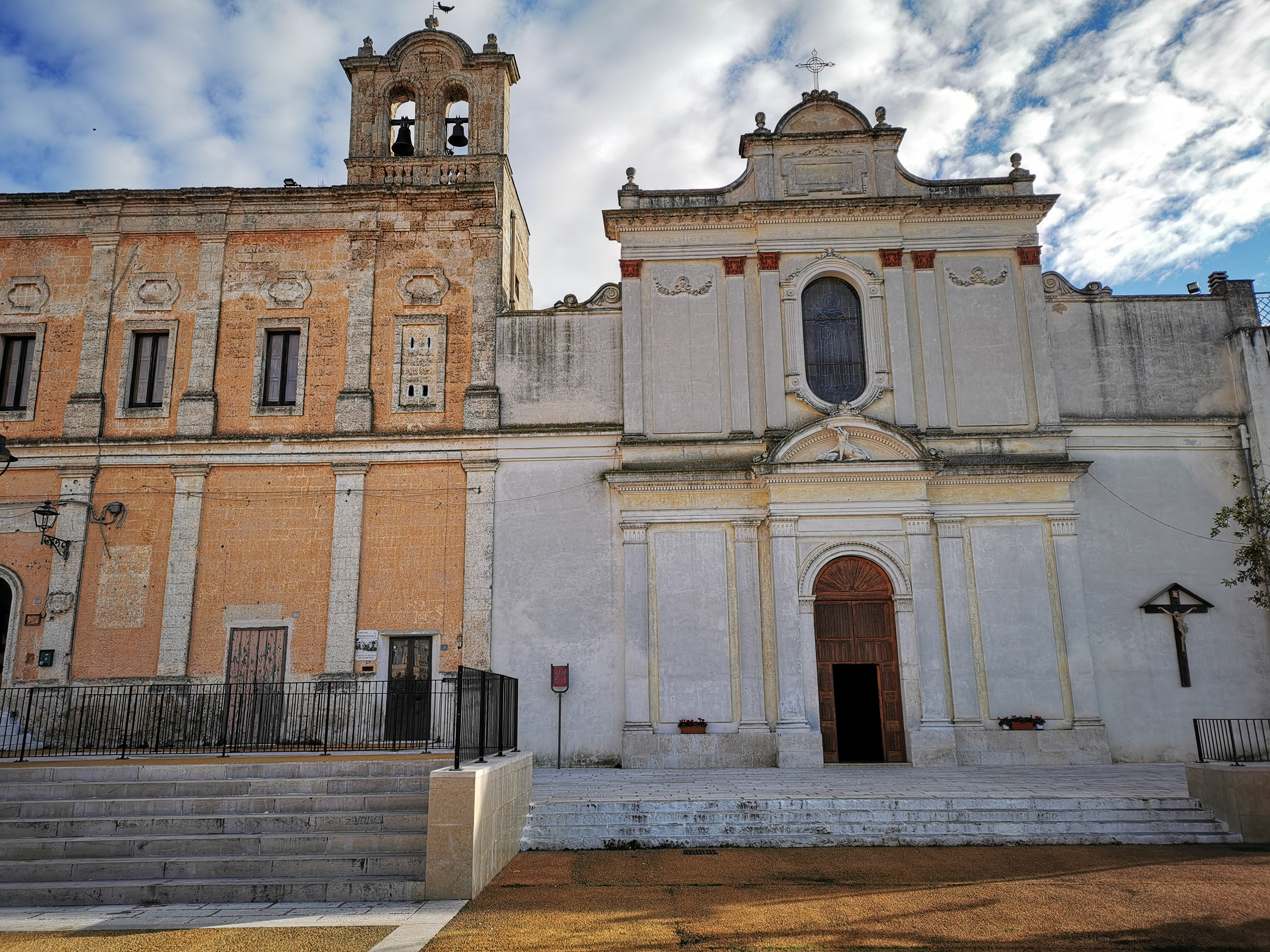
Exterior view of the Chiesa di San Domenico

San Domenico is a renaissance-style, former Roman Catholic church located in the town of Oria, province of Brindisi, Apulia, Italy.

== History ==
Dominican friars had been in Oria since the 13th century. This church and convent was erected in 1572 by the Dominican order. The church was restored in 1765-1775 by Saverio Amodio, but by 1806, the convent had been suppressed and the monks expelled. The church remained consecrated but was again refurbished in 1897, this time with a Neoclassical façade. Above the portal is the symbol of the book and cane of the Dominicans

In the Chapel of the Presentation at the Temple on the right is a polychrome stone altar (1670) with an altarpiece (1701) by G. Zullo. The Chapel of St Anne has a Birth of the Virgin altarpiece, while the Chapel of the Holy Sacrament has a Last Supper, both 17th-century works by unknown authors. The transept has two altars (circa 1718) attributed to Giuseppe Cino. These have altarpieces depicting San Domenico by Papagiorgio, and a Madonna of the Rosary. The Apse has paintings depicting the Annunciation, Pentecost, and the Heavenly Assumption of Mary

in the Chapel of the Sacred heard there is a 17th-century Washing of Feet. The Chapel of St Vincent Ferrer houses a painting of the saint (1734) by D. Bianchi.
