= San Francesco da Paola, Oria =

Italian church

Coordinates: 40.498059°N 17.640000°E

San Francesco da Paola is a renaissance-style, former Roman Catholic church located in the town of Oria, province of Brindisi, Apulia, Italy.

== History ==
In the 880s, bishop Theodosius had a chapel or burial crypt built for the relics of Barsanuphius of Gaza, a hermit and desert father, close to the porta Hebraica. This chapel sheltered the relics until 1170 when they were transferred to the cathedral. In 1580 the current church and a convent were erected on top of this crypt.
