= Madonna della Scala, Oria =

13th-century Roman Catholic church in Apulia, Italy

Coordinates: 40°28′27.1″N 17°38′56.5″E

Madonna della Scala
- Madonna della Scala
- Location: Oria, Apulia, Italy
- Denomination: Roman Catholic

History
- Founded: 13th-century

The Madonna della Scala is a rural church or chapel, some three kilometers south of the town of Oria in the province of Brindisi, region of Apulia, Italy.

The building was erected between 13th and 14th centuries, although it may have served to house eremitic Basilian monks as early as the 8th century. The church at one time had a Benedictine monastery attached. The romanesque style building is a simple block with a small oculus. The interior walls are stuccoed, and it is notable for frescoes in Byzantine style depicting the Old Testament and the Apocalypse.
