= Joseph ben Uri Sheraga =

Joseph ben Uri Sheraga (Hebrew: יוסף בן אורי שרגא, romanized: Yosef ben Uri Shraga; fl. 17th century) was a Jewish liturgical poet from Kobrin.

He was the author of Ma'arakah Ḥadashah (Frankfurt, 1699), containing three seliḥot in commemoration of the persecutions of the Jews of Kaidan and Zausmer in 1698. The first, beginning Alluf baṭuaḥ, is unique in that not only are the verses arranged in alphabetical order, but each verse begins with the name of the corresponding letter. This seliḥah is provided with a commentary written by the author himself.

== Bibliography ==
- Ma'arakah Ḥadashah (in Hebrew). Frankfurt. 1699.
