= Solomon ben Judah Ghayyat =

Medieval poet

Solomon ben Judah Ghayyat (Hebrew: שלמה בן יהודה גיאת, romanized: Shelomo ben Yehuda Giyat; fl. 12th century) was a medieval Hebrew poet.

He was possibly a grandson of Isaac Ghayyat of Lucena. Solomon was on terms of friendship with Judah ha-Levi, who dedicated to him one of the most important compositions of his Diwan. This poem, which is a rejoinder to one of Ghayyat's, not only shows the high esteem which Ha-Levi had for his friend, but also refers to Ghayyat's poetic activity and talent.

Only two poems by Ghayyat have been preserved, and these are religious ones, namely, Shaḥoti we-Nidketi we-Libbi Zoḥel, a seliḥah for the Tenth of Tevet, in the ritual of Carpentras, and 'Enenu Ẓofiyyah 'Anenu mi-Sheme 'Aliyyab, a tokaḥah for the minḥah of Yom Kippur, in the rituals of Castile and Fez, as well as in some earlier editions of the Spanish Maḥzor.
