= Shabbethai Donnolo =

Graeco-Italia Jewish physician

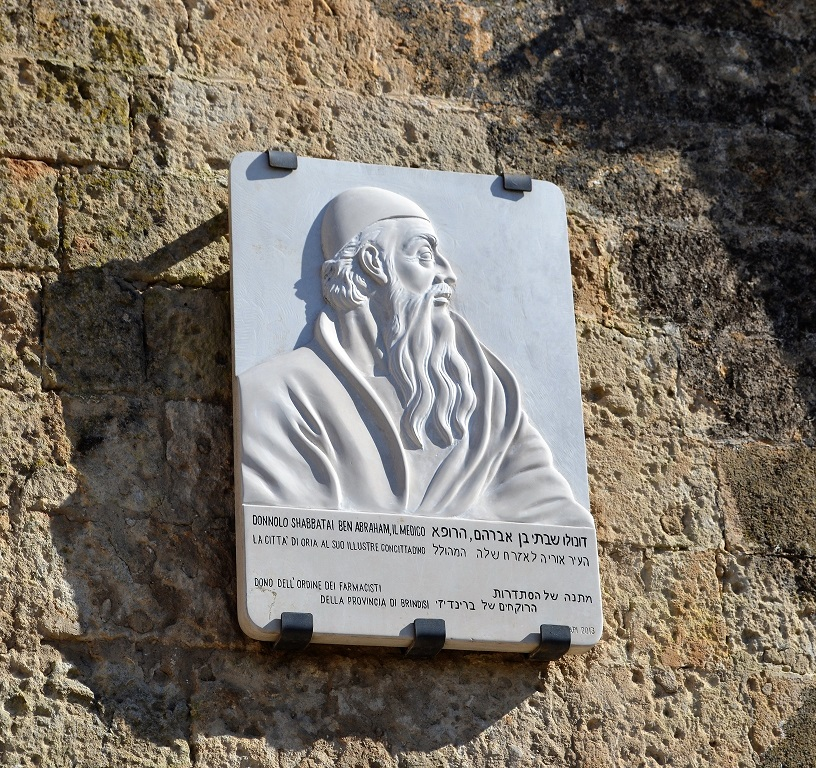
Shabbethai Donnolo in a bas relief of Oria, Italy

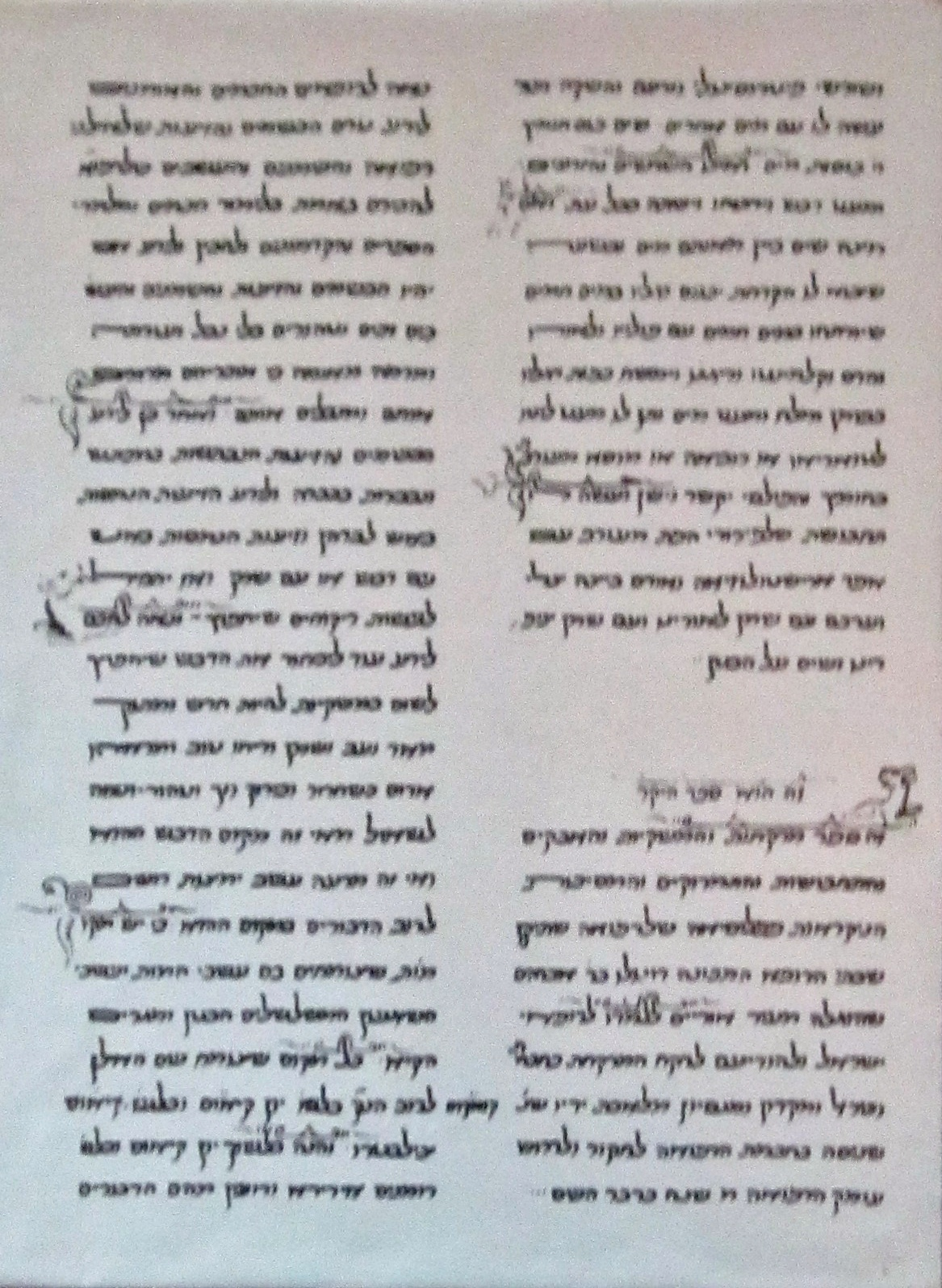
"Sefer Ha Yakar" by Shabbetai Donnolo

Shabbethai Donnolo (913 – c. 982, Hebrew: שבתי דונולו) was a Graeco-Italian Jewish physician and writer on medicine and astrology.

== Biography ==
Donnolo was born in Oria, Apulia. When he was twelve years old (4 July 925), he was taken prisoner by Arabs under the leadership of the Fatimid amir Abu Ahmad Ja'far ibn 'Ubaid, but was ransomed by his relatives in Otranto, while the rest of his family was carried to Palermo and North Africa. He turned to medicine and astrology for a livelihood, studying the sciences of "the Greeks, Arabs, Babylonians, and Indians." As no Jews at that time busied themselves with these subjects, he traveled in Italy in search of learned non-Jews. His special teacher was an Arab from Baghdad. According to the biography of Nilus the Younger, abbot of Rossano, Donnolo practiced medicine for some time in that city. Later he would become the Byzantine court physician. The alleged gravestone of Donnolo, found by Abraham Firkovich in the Crimea, is evidently spurious.

Donnolo is one of the earliest Jewish writers on medicine, and one of the few Jewish scholars of southern Italy at this early time. What remains of his medical work, Sefer ha-Yaqar "Precious Book", was published by Moritz Steinschneider in 1867, from MS. 37, Plut. 88, in the Medicean Library in Florence, and contains an "antidotarium," or book of practical directions for preparing medicinal roots. Donnolo's medical science is based on Greco-Latin sources; only one Arabic plant-name occurs. He cites Asaph the Jew.

In addition, he wrote a commentary to the Sefer Yetzirah, dealing almost wholly with astrology, and called Ḥakhmoni (in one manuscript, Taḥkemoni; see Second Book of Samuel 23:8; I Chronicles 11:11). At the end of the preface is a table giving the position of the heavenly bodies in Elul of the year 946. The treatise published by Adolf Neubauer is part of a religio-astrological commentary on the Book of Genesis 1:26 (written in 982), which probably formed a sort of introduction to the Ḥakhmoni, in which the idea that man is a microcosm is worked out. Parts of this introduction are found word for word in the anonymous Orchot Tzaddikim (or Sefer Middot) and the Sheveṭ Musar of Elijah ben Solomon Abraham ha-Kohen. It was published separately by Adolf Jellinek.

Donnolo's style is worthy of note; many Hebrew forms and words are here found for the first time. He uses the acrostic freely, giving his own name not only in the poetic mosaic of passages from the Book of Proverbs in the Bodleian fragment, but also in the rimed prose introduction to the Ḥakemani. He is also the first to cite the Midrash Tehillim. In the Pseudo-Saadia commentary to the Sefer Yetzirah. There are many citations from Donnolo, notably from a lost commentary of his on the Baraita of Samuel. Abraham Epstein has shown that extensive extracts from Donnolo are also to be found in Eleazar of Worms' Sefer Yetzirah commentary (ed. Przemysl, 1889), even to the extent of the tables and illustrations. He is also mentioned by Rashi, by Isaac ben Samuel of Acre (who calls the Ḥakemani the Sefer ha-Mazzalot), and by Solomon ben Judah of Lunel (1424) in his Ḥesheq Shlomoh to Judah Halevi's Kuzari.
