= Monte Cassino Territorial Abbey =

Territorial abbey in Italy

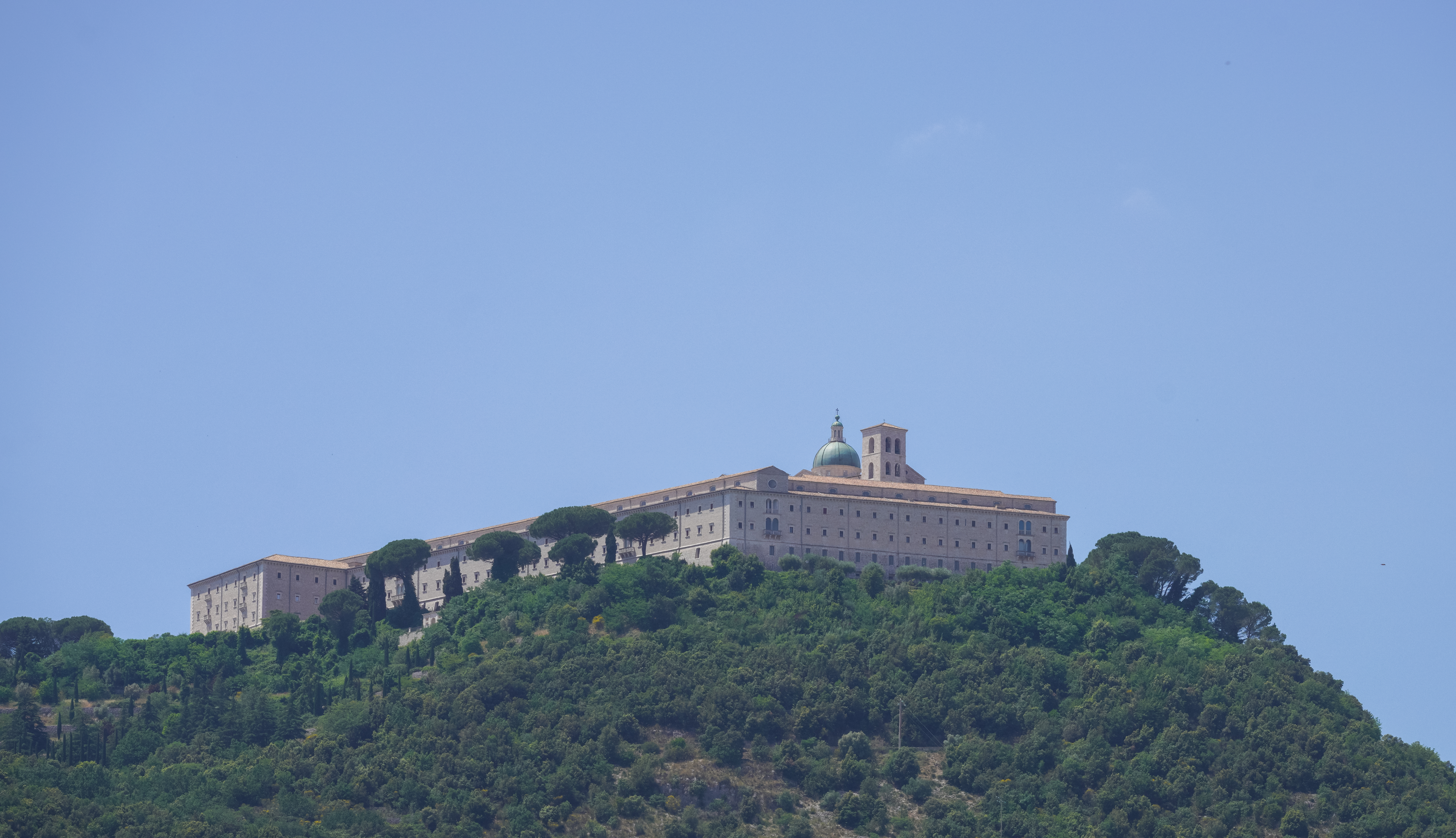
Monte Cassino Abbey

Monte Cassino Territorial Abbey or Monte Cassino Archicoenobium (Italian: Abbazia territoriale di Montecassino) is a territorial abbey in Italy and a see of the Roman Catholic Church immediately subject, which belongs to the Ecclesiastical Region of Latium. As of 2016, there were 13 inhabitants, all baptized. The seat is governed by the Right Reverend Abbot Antonio Luca Fallica O.S.B.

The abbey of Monte Cassino is located in the region of Latium, in the Province of Frosinone and in the municipality of Cassino and is the seat of the Casinense Congregation.

The monastery, situated on the rocky hill (altitude 516 m) of Monte Cassino near Cassino, a town in southern Latium, was founded by Benedict of Nursia around the year 529. Frequently destroyed, it has repeatedly revived (hence the motto "succisa virescit" on the monastery's coat of arms) and has been renowned for its letters and arts for many centuries. It is considered the most significant of all the monasteries following the rule of Benedict and is referred to as an archabbey or archicoenobium either because of the relics of Benedict, which are venerated according to ancient tradition in the crypt of the abbey church, or because of its own rule, which, although written solely for the monks of Monte Cassino, gradually displaced earlier rules in many monasteries, eventually becoming the Carolingian law for monastic life and playing a significant role in shaping medieval and Western European culture.

== History ==
Pope Gregory the Great in the second book of his dialogues refers to Benedict having built a new monastery near the town of Cassino, which was then located "on the side of a high mountain," in the grove of Apollo as a result of controversies with a certain priest left behind: "He shattered the idol, overturned the altar, set the groves on fire, and in the very temple of Apollo, where the altar of Apollo had been, built the oratory of Saint Martin" (dial. 2,8). Later Benedictine memory suggests this occurred in the year 529, which seems to match the year when the monastery of Monte Cassino was equivalent to the closed Academy of Athens (as if it were a new Academy for the Christian world). Benedict wrote the rule there; he also received Totila, king of the Ostrogoths in hospitality (dial 2,14) around the year 543, which is the only time in Benedict's life historically certain; he died and was buried there (according to a second tradition, March 21, 547).

In 577, the monastery was destroyed by the Lombards, and the surviving monks fled to Rome. It was restored in the early years of the eighth century by Abbot Petronace, at the command of Pope Gregory II. This began a flourishing era for the Cassinese monastery. Among the monks were Carloman, Pippin III's brother; Ratchis; and Paul the Deacon, who wrote the History of the Lombard People. From the donation of Duke Gisulf of Benevento came the Land of Saint Benedict, which was a region between Monte Cassino and the Tyrrhenian Sea, notable more for its authority in public and ecclesiastical affairs than for its size.

In 883, a band of Muslims (then known as Saracens) attacked, plundered, and burned the monastery. Abbot Bertarius fell, and the surviving monks first fled to Teano, then to Capua. In the mid-10th century, monastic life revived, and under Abbot Desiderius (abbot 1058–1087), who later became Pope Victor III, the monastery reached the peak of its dignity. It boasted more than 200 monks, became renowned throughout the West for its manuscript letters and arts, and the basilica was restored and decorated by artists Dubsig brought from Constantinople.

In 1349, the monastery was destroyed for the third time by an earthquake. It was splendidly rebuilt, but it gradually lost its authority despite maintaining its size and beauty until 1944. In 1503, the monastery and the Land of Saint Benedict came under the rule of the Kingdom of Naples, in 1505 it was united with the Monastery of Saint Justina of Padua, and in 1799 it was plundered by Napoleonic soldiers and soon after suppressed. During the restoration, it revived again, but with the suppression of other monasteries in Italy in 1866, the Abbey of Monte Cassino was transformed into a national monument with lay guardians.

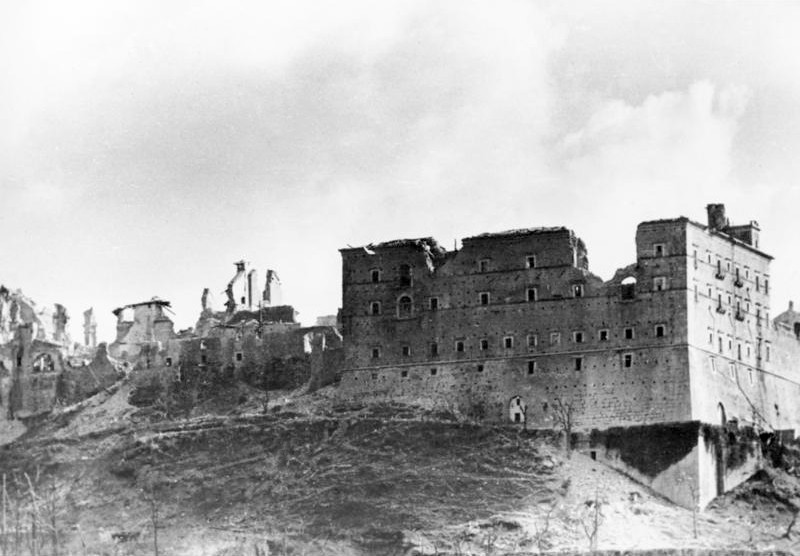
1944: destroyed monastery

The monastery was finally destroyed on February 15, 1944, during World War II, as it was on the front line among enemy forces. It has been reconstructed as closely as possible to its original design by the restoring abbot Ildefonso Rea: "where it was, as it was."

== Sights ==
- The "del Bramante" cloister, the benefactors' cloister, the basilica, and the museum, as well as other sights, can be viewed on the Monte Cassino page, where they are explained in detail with images in various languages (including Latin).
- The Cathedral Church of the Assumption of Saint Mary and Saint Benedict Abbot.

== Offices and Duties ==
The prominent office is that of the Divine Office (according to Saint Benedict: "Nothing is to be preferred to the Work of God" ), for which monks gather for prayer seven times a day.

Additionally, some monks spend their lives in studies, others in managing the library and archives, some are dedicated to painting icons or sacred images, while others focus on welcoming pilgrims or working on various activities related to worship and humanity.

== Diocese ==
The Abbey of Monte Cassino is a territorial abbey and the seat of the episcopal see of the Roman Catholic Apostolic See exempt diocese, which belongs to the Ecclesiastical Region of Latium. The name of the episcopal see is Monte Cassino Territorial Abbey. Established in the sixth century, as of 2014, there are 11 Catholics. It is currently governed by the archabbot Donato Ogliari.

== Notable monks ==
- Carloman (mayor of the palace)
- Paul the Deacon, historian
- Amatus of Monte Cassino, historian
- Frederick of Lorraine = Stephen X, Pope
- Desiderius = Victor III, pope, who was previously abbot of the monastery
- John of Caetani d'Aragona = Gelasius II, pope, who was previously chancellor and librarian at the Abbey of Monte Cassino.

== Bibliography ==
- Dell’Omo, Mariano. 1999. Montecassino: Un abbazia nella storia. Milan: Cinisello Balsamo. Italian, Latin.
- Michela Cigola, L'abbazia benedettina di Montecassino. La storia attraverso le testimonianze grafiche di rilievo e di progetto. Cassini, Ciolfi Editore, 2005. ISBN 88-86810-28-8. Italian.

== Gallery ==
Abbot's coat of arms.

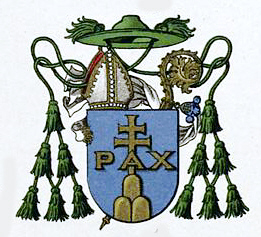

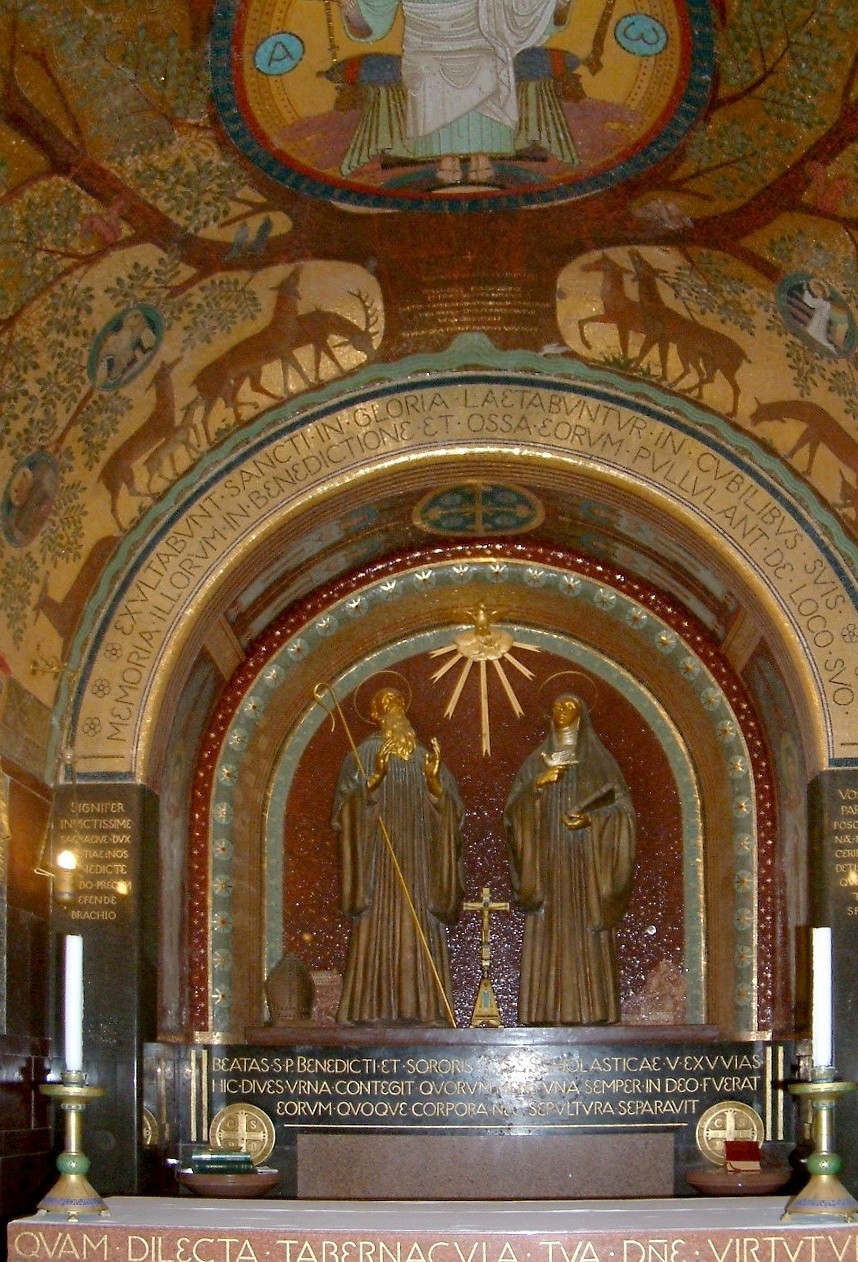
Crypt: altar with statues of Saint Benedict and Saint Scholastica

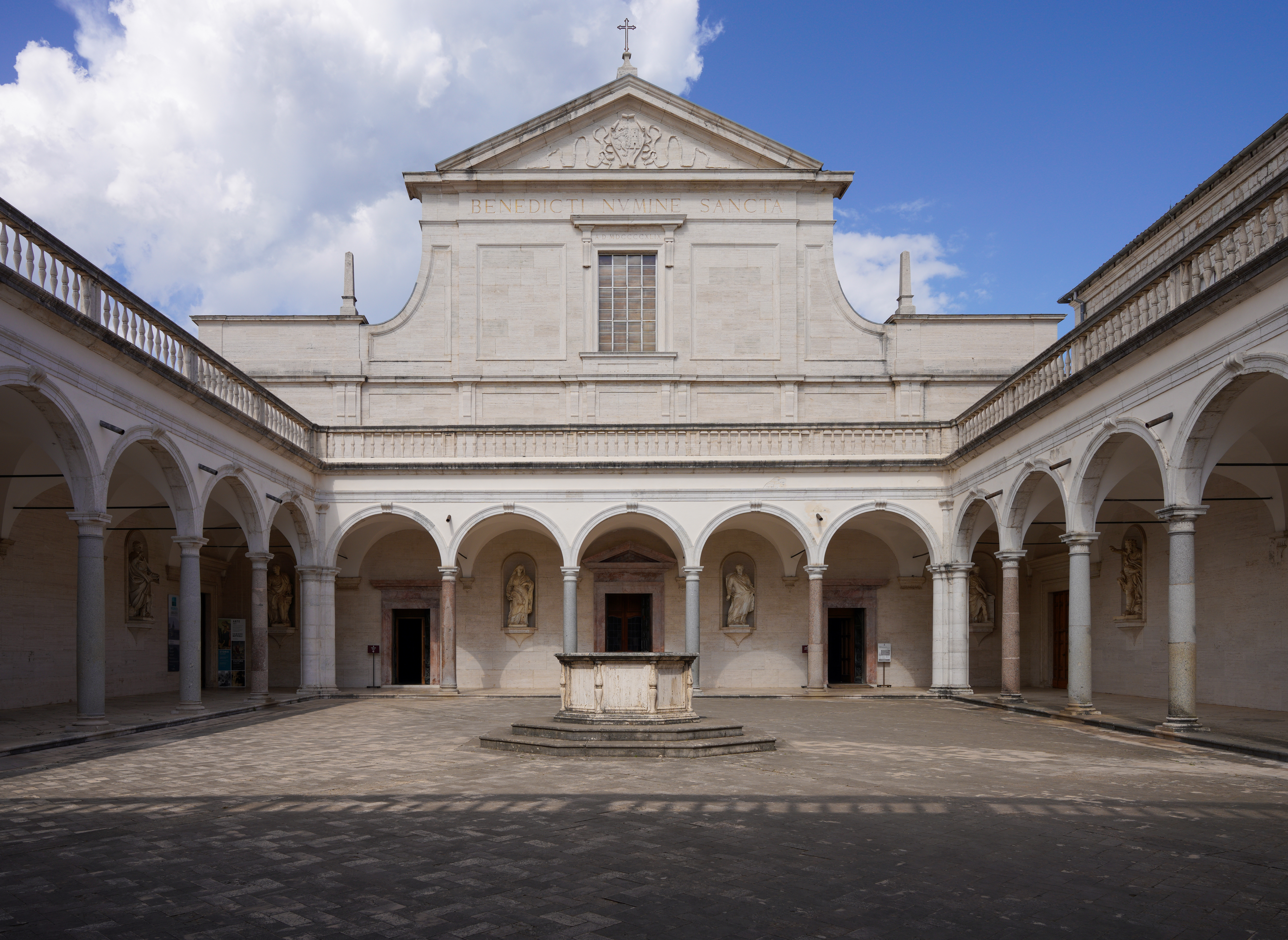
Benefactors' cloister

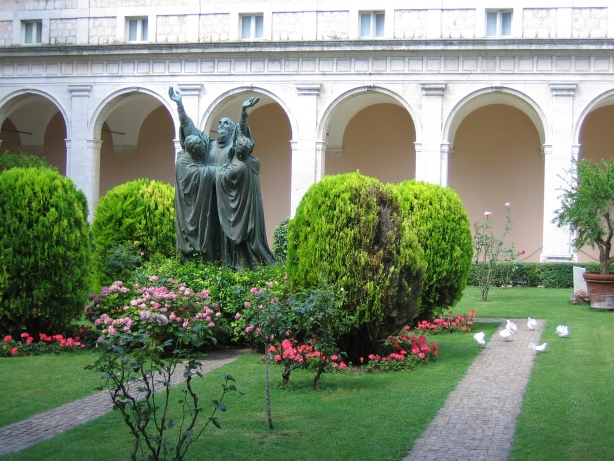
Cloister near the entrance

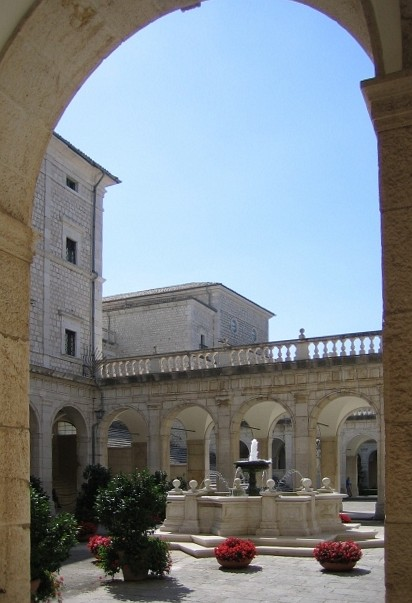
Cloister with fountain behind the benefactors' cloister
