= Hebrew poetry =

Disambiguation page

Hebrew poetry is poetry written in the Hebrew language. It encompasses such things as:

- Biblical poetry, the poetry found in the poetic books of the Hebrew Bible
- Piyyut, religious Jewish liturgical poetry in Hebrew or Aramaic
- Medieval Hebrew poetry written in Hebrew
- Modern Hebrew poetry, poetry written after the revival of the Hebrew language

== See also ==
- List of Hebrew-language poets
- Hebrew literature
- Israeli literature
- Jewish literature
