= Oria, Apulia =

Oria Orìa (Greek)
- Comune
- Comune di Oria
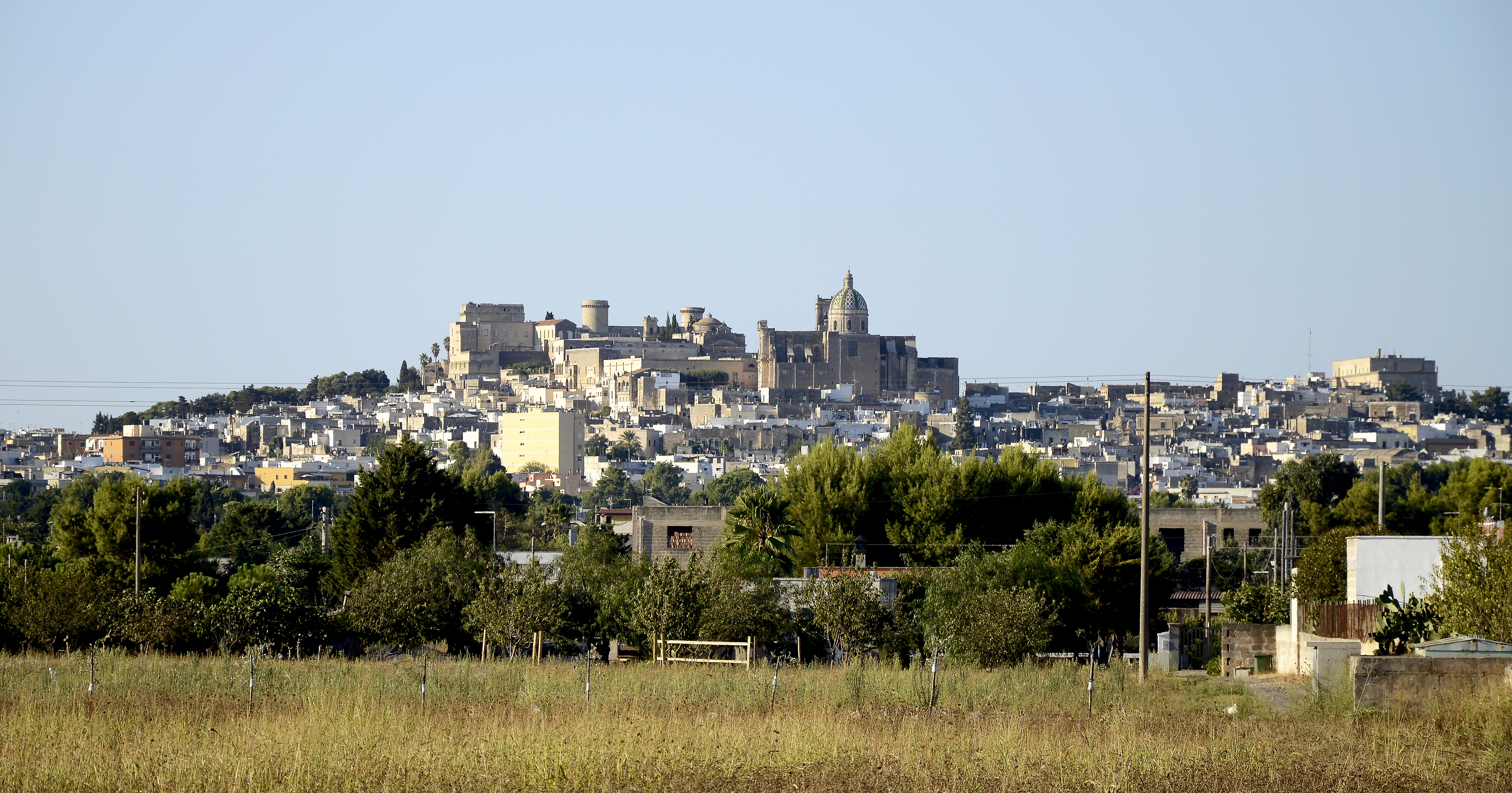
- View of Oria

- Flag Coat of arms

- Location within Italy Location within Apulia
- Coordinates: 40°30′N 17°38′E
- Country: Italy
- Region: Apulia
- Province: Brindisi (BR)

Government
  - Mayor: Cosimo FERRETTI

Area
  - Total: 83 km^{2} (32 sq mi)
- Elevation: 83 m (272 ft)

Population (31 December 2017)
  - Total: 15,094
  - Density: 180/km^{2} (470/sq mi)
- Demonym: Oritani
- Time zone: UTC+1 (CET)
  - Summer (DST): UTC+2 (CEST)
- Postal code: 72024
- Dialing code: 0831
- Patron saint: Barsanuphius of Palestine
- Saint day: August 29
- Website: Official website

Oria (or Orra, Latin: Uria; Ancient Greek: Ὑρία, romanized: Huría or Οὐρία, Ouría; Hebrew: אוריה, romanized: uriya) is a town and comune in the Apulia region (Salento), in the province of Brindisi, in southern Italy. It is the seat of the Roman Catholic Diocese of Oria.

== History ==
=== Antiquity ===
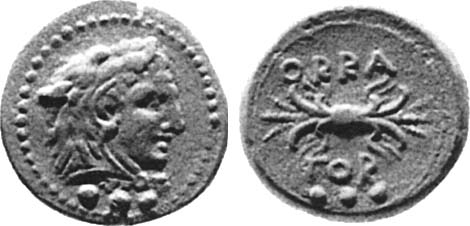
A coin from Oria, Roman age, portraying Hercules.

In classical times, Oria was known as Hyria (Uria) or Hyrium, one of the principal ancient Messapian cities. It was just north of the ancient town of Manduria, southwest of Brundisium, and southeast of Taras/Tarentum, corresponding to the location of the modern town.

According to Herodotus (7.170), it was founded by the Messapians (who, according to Herodotus, were originally Cretans) sometime after the abortive siege of the Sicanian city Camicus. Messapians were probably of Illyrian origin. Strabo mentions that he saw there the old palace of the Messapian kings (vi. 3. 6, p. 282). Between 217 and 84 BC the city was minting its own coins. The coins often feature Iapagus, the Iapygian national hero.

=== Middle Ages ===
Oria was conquered by the Romans and became an important Byzantine stronghold in the years 834-871, when Arabs conquered large parts of southern Italy. For security reasons, the bishop of Brindisi moved his residence to Oria. In 882, Emperor Basil I installed the former duke of Benevento, Guaifer, in the town as protosphartarios. Bishop Theodosius deposited the relics of Saint Barsanuphius of Gaza in a chapel in the 880s close to the Porta degli Ebrei. They were kept there until 1170. The church of San Francesco da Paola was later built there in 1580.

There was a flourishing Jewish population until the Arab conquest in 925. Latin chronicles report the massacre of the male population, Jewish texts lament the loss of scholars, and Arab sources boast of the rich booty. The Jewish physician Shabbethai Donnolo was among those captured by the Arabs, but was later ransomed.

Oria was destroyed again in 977. In 1266, Oria was besieged by Manfred of Sicily.

=== Modern period ===
On September 21st 1897 the town was heavily damaged by an F4 tornado, with major damage being done to the western part of the town. The most major damages and casualties were recorded in Oria, with the nearby towns of Torricella, Sava, and Latiano also suffering damages.

== Main sights ==
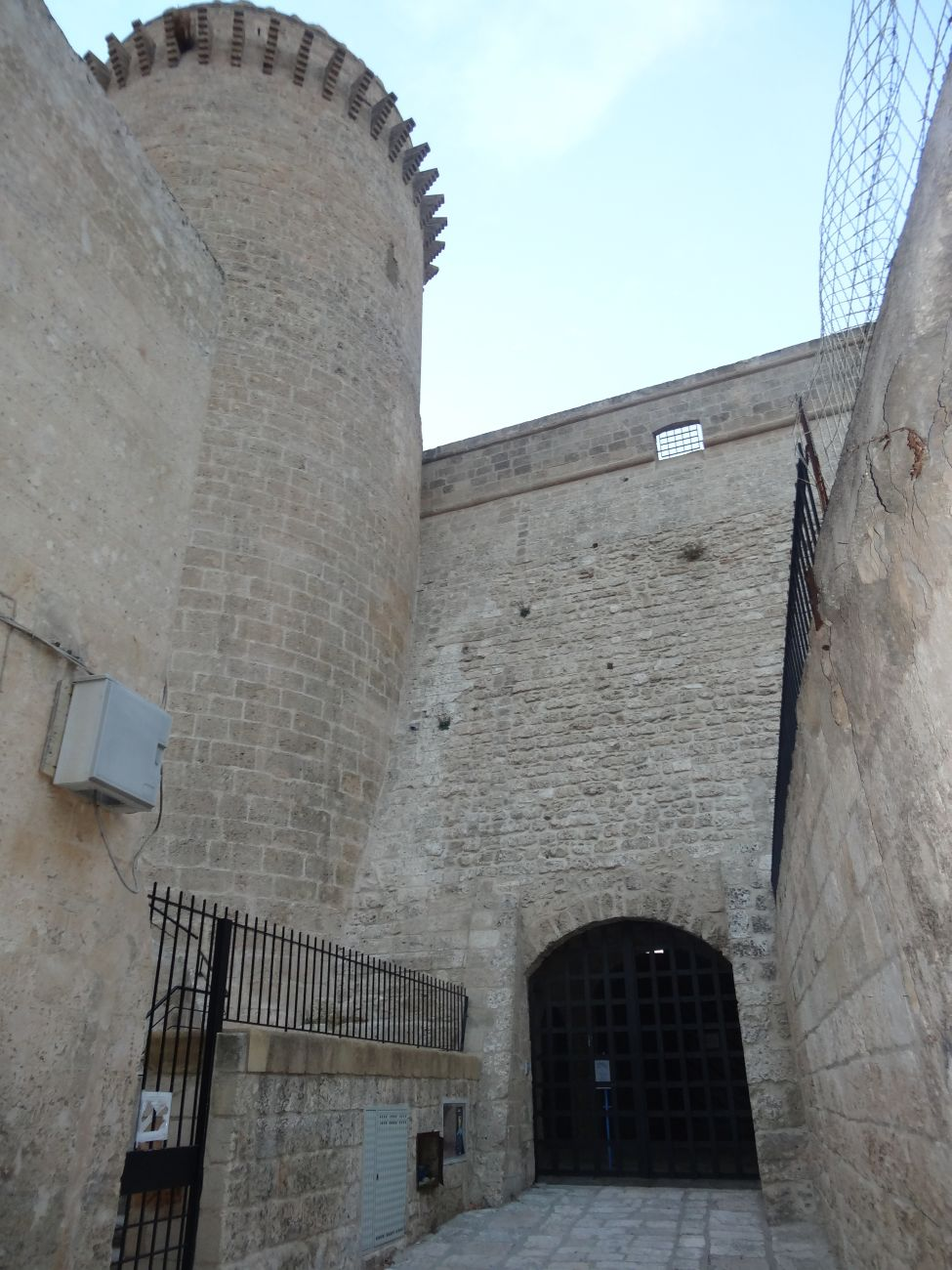
The castle.

- Castle of Oria – Largely rebuilt in the early 13th century under Frederick II Hohenstaufen and later modified by the Angevines, who added two cylindrical towers. The castle dominates the town and has historically served both defensive and residential functions.
- Gate of the Jews (Italian: Porta degli Ebrei) – A medieval city gate traditionally associated with the Jewish quarter of Oria, one of the most ancient Jewish communities in southern Italy.
- Oria Cathedral – A Baroque basilica built beginning in 1750 atop the ruins of an earlier church destroyed by an earthquake. Its interior preserves paintings dating from the 17th to the 20th century, while the exterior features a prominent multicoloured tiled dome.
- Church of San Domenico – Construction began in 1572. The church contains Baroque artworks and an adjoining convent with a notable cloister.
- Church of San Francesco d'Assisi – A historic church dedicated to Saint Francis of Assisi, featuring elements from various renovations over the centuries.
- Church of San Francesco da Paola – A late 16th-century church built in honour of Saint Francis of Paola.
- Church of San Giovanni Battista – Originally constructed in the 14th century, the church was later incorporated into a larger Baroque structure in the 17th century.
- Sanctuary of Madonna della Scala – A grotto church located just outside the town, known for its devotional significance and rural setting.
- Bishop's Palace – A 16th-century episcopal residence located near the cathedral.
- Sanctuary of San Cosimo alla Macchia – A pilgrimage site located in the countryside outside Oria, dedicated to Saints Cosmas and Damian, featuring religious festivities and a market.

== Jewish presence ==
Oria had one of the oldest Jewish communities in Europe. Jewish scholarship in Oria included the study of philosophy, the Talmud, languages such as Greek and Latin, medicine and natural sciences. It was home to Shefatya ben Amitai and Shabbethai Donnolo, two of the first Hebrew writers native to Europe.

Ten scholars in the community were killed when Arabs under Abu Ahmad Ja'far ibn 'Ubaid conquered Oria on July 4, 925 AD. This was the beginning of the end of Jewish presence in Oria; the last trace was an epitaph produced in 1035. It is likely, however, that Jews lived in Oria until the 15th century.

== Notable people ==
- Shabbethai Donnolo (913 – c. 982), Jewish scholar and writer
- Francesco Milizia (1725–1798), neoclassisictic

== Twin cities ==
Oria is twinned with:

- Lorch, Germany.
- Miekinia, Poland.
- Sarteano, Italy.
