= Isabel of Coimbra =

Queen of Portugal from 1447 to 1455

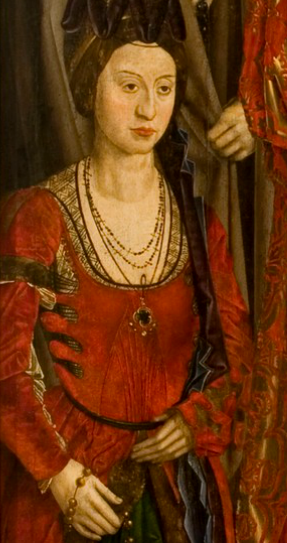
- Detail of the Saint Vincent Panels masterpiece by Nuno Gonçalves

Queen consort of Portugal
- Tenure: 6 May 1447 – 2 December 1455
- Born: 1 March 1432; Coimbra
- Died: 2 December 1455 (aged 23); Évora
- Burial: Batalha Monastery
- Spouse: Afonso V of Portugal (m. 1447)
- Issue: John, Hereditary Prince of Portugal; Joanna, Princess of Portugal; John II of Portugal
- House: Aviz
- Father: Peter, Duke of Coimbra
- Mother: Isabella of Urgell

Infanta Isabel of Coimbra (Isabella of Portugal) (1 March 1432 – 2 December 1455) was a Portuguese infanta and Queen of Portugal as the first wife of King Afonso V of Portugal.

== Biography ==
=== Early life and background ===
Born in Coimbra in 1432, Isabella was the eldest daughter of the Infante Peter, Duke of Coimbra and Isabella of Aragon, Countess of Urgel. Her paternal grandfather was King John I of Portugal and her maternal grandfather was James II, Count of Urgel. Beginning in 1439, Isabella's father Peter served as regent for her cousin Afonso V during his minority.

Isabella received a comprehensive Renaissance education influenced by the works of Christine de Pizan.

In accordance with the wishes of the late Edward of Portugal, Peter arranged Isabella's betrothal to Afonso V in 1441. The engagement caused conflict with Afonso, Count of Barcelos, Peter's half-brother and political enemy, who had wished for the monarch to marry his granddaughter. Relations further deteriorated when Peter had Isabella's brother elected the Constable of Portugal in 1443, a title that the Count of Barcelos believed rightfully belonged to his eldest son, Afonso, Marquis of Valença.

=== Queen ===
Isabella and Afonso V were married on 6 May 1447. Both bride and groom were fifteen. Isabella was given the income of Santarém, Alvaiázere, Sintra and Torres Vedras at her wedding.

The Count of Barcelos began to wield more influence over Afonso and persuaded him to dismiss Peter in July 1448. Tensions escalated in the following months; Afonso annulled all edicts passed during the regency, stripped Isabella's brother of the title of Constable, and isolated Peter to his estates in Coimbra. In early 1449, Afonso interpreted Peter's refusal to yield all arms as an act of rebellion and began preparing for civil war.

Deeply devoted to both her husband and her father, Isabella did her best to mediate. She reportedly dropped to her knees and implored Afonso to have mercy on Peter. Afonso responded that he would be lenient if his father-in-law requested pardon. Peter reluctantly agreed, writing to Isabella, "This I do, lady, rather to please you, and because you have so bidden me, than because I deem it in reason for me to do." Afonso considered the penitence insincere and therefore unacceptable.

Isabella's father rebelled and was killed in the Battle of Alfarrobeira in 1449. Her siblings were then exiled: John, James, and Beatrice went to the court of their aunt Isabella in Burgundy, while her brother Peter fled to Castile. Isabella herself did not fall out of favour with the king, however, and she took control of the duchy of Coimbra until her brother John returned to Portugal in 1454.

In 1455, Isabella had her father honoured with a ceremony of exoneration at court and had him re-buried in a grand way. Shortly after this, she died at age twenty-three, possibly from poisoning. In her will, she left her inheritance to her sister, Philippa of Coimbra.

== Issue ==
Isabella had three children:

- John, Prince of Portugal (29 January 1451)
- Joan, Princess of Portugal (6 February 1452 – 12 May 1490): Known as Saint Joan of Portugal or Saint Princess Joan. She was beatified in 1693 by Pope Innocent XII.
- John II of Portugal (3 March 1455 – 25 October 1495): Succeeded his father as 13th King of Portugal.

== Ancestry ==
Ancestors of Isabel of Coimbra

8. Peter I of Portugal
4. John I of Portugal
9. Teresa Lourenço
2. Peter, Duke of Coimbra
10. John of Gaunt, 1st Duke of Lancaster
5. Philippa of Lancaster
11. Blanche of Lancaster
1. Isabel of Coimbra
12. Peter II, Count of Urgell
6. James II, Count of Urgell
13. Margaret of Montferrat
3. Isabella of Urgell
14. Peter IV of Aragon
7. Isabella of Aragon
15. Sibila de Fortià

Isabel of Coimbra House of Aviz Cadet branch of the House of Burgundy Born: 1 March 1432 Died: 2 December 1455
Portuguese royalty
Vacant Title last held by Eleanor of Aragon	Queen consort of Portugal and the Algarves; 6 May 1447 – 2 December 1455	Vacant Title next held by Joanna la Beltraneja
