= John of Coimbra, Prince of Antioch =

John of Coimbra
- Prince of Antioch
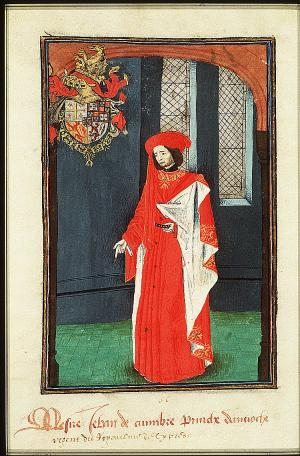
- Born: 1431
- Died: 11 September 1457 (aged 25–26); Nicosia
- Spouse: Charlotte of Cyprus
- House: Aviz
- Father: Infante Peter, Duke of Coimbra
- Mother: Isabella of Urgell, Duchess of Coimbra

John, Prince of Antioch (1431 – 11 September 1457) was the second son of Peter, Duke of Coimbra, and Isabella of Urgell, Duchess of Coimbra.

== Life ==
After the Battle of Alfarrobeira, where his father, Peter, Duke of Coimbra's army was defeated by the forces of Afonso V, John went into exile in Burgundy together with his brother James and sister Beatrice. His aunt Isabella, wife of Duke Philip the Good, was able to offer protection to her nephews and niece and ensure they had a high social position.

In May 1456, John was made a Knight of the Order of the Golden Fleece. He then sailed to Cyprus and married Charlotte of Cyprus in Nicosia and was accorded the title Prince of Antioch. At court he counterbalanced the Greek Orthodox influence of his mother-in-law, Helena Palaiologina. After a short illness, allegedly due to poisoning, he died in 1457 and was buried in the Church of St. Francis in Nicosia.

== Coat of arms ==
Coat of Arms of Infante John of Coimbra, Prince of Antioch

Following his marriage to Charlotte, John bore a unique coat of arms, combining: (I) the Kingdom of Jerusalem, (II) his father's Portuguese-English ancestry, (III) the Kingdom of Armenia, (IV) the Kingdom of Cyprus; on top the arms of Lusignan.

== Ancestry ==
Ancestors of John of Coimbra, Prince of Antioch

16. Afonso IV of Portugal
8. Peter I of Portugal
17. Beatrice of Castile
4. John I of Portugal
18. Lourenço Martins
9. Teresa Lourenço
19. Sancha Martins
2. Peter, Duke of Coimbra
20. Edward III of England
10. John of Gaunt, 1st Duke of Lancaster
21. Philippa of Hainault
5. Philippa of Lancaster
22. Henry of Grosmont, 1st Duke of Lancaster
11. Blanche of Lancaster
23. Isabel of Beaumont
1. John, Prince of Antioch
24. James I, Count of Urgell
12. Peter II, Count of Urgell
25. Cecilia of Comminges
6. James II, Count of Urgell
26. John II, Marquis of Montferrat
13. Margaret of Montferrat
27. Isabella of Majorca
3. Isabella of Urgell
28. Alfonso IV of Aragon
14. Peter IV of Aragon
29. Teresa d'Entença
7. Isabella of Aragon
30. Berenguer de Fortià
15. Sibila de Fortià
31. Francesca de Vilamarí
