= James of Portugal =

James of Coimbra
- Bishop of Arras and of Paphos; Archbishop of Lisbon
- Coat of Arms of James of Portugal, combining his father coat of arms (Aviz-Coimbra) with his mother's (Aragon).
- Born: 17 September 1433
- Died: 27 August 1459 (aged 25); Florence, Florentine Republic
- House: Aviz
- Father: Peter, Duke of Coimbra
- Mother: Isabella of Urgell
- Religion: Roman Catholicism

Jaime or James of Portugal (17 September 1433 – 27 August 1459), also known as James of Coimbra, James of Lusitania, was a Portuguese infante (prince) of the House of Aviz, and a bishop and cardinal of the Roman Catholic Church.

== Early life and background ==
James was the 3rd son of Infante Pedro, Duke of Coimbra, and Isabella of Urgell.

In 1449, at the age of 15, James accompanied his father in the Battle of Alfarrobeira. During the conflict, his father's forces were defeated by the Portuguese royal army, and his father was killed. After the battle, James was taken captive but was later freed as a result of the intervention of his aunt Isabella and her husband Duke Philip the Good of Burgundy. He then went into exile in Burgundy together with his brother John and his sister Beatrice. His aunt ensured that the siblings were well provided for.

== Church career ==
James of Portugal studied in Flanders and, on 23 March 1453, was appointed Bishop of Arras. On his aunt’s advice, he traveled to Rome, where Pope Nicholas V, hearing of the disgraces inflicted upon his family after Alfarrobeira, resolved to appoint the young James as the new Archbishop of Lisbon, which had been recently vacated by the death of D. Luís Coutinho. However, not being old enough to be consecrated to the dignity, James was only appointed administrator in perpetuity of the Archdiocese on 30 April 1453. Given the political situation in Portugal, James was unable to return to Lisbon to take possession of it, and so remained in Italy and governed his archdiocese from afar, via the vicar-general Luís Anes.

The new pope Calixtus III (Nicholas V having died in early 1455) elevated James to a cardinal-deacon of the Church (despite not having the requisite 30 years of age for the office), assigning him the titular diaconate of Santa Maria in Portico Octaviae, soon substituted for the diaconate of Sant'Eustachio. Callixtus III also gave James the Bishopric of Paphos, in Cyprus, where his brother, John, had married Charlotte of Lusignan, Princess of Cyprus.

Following the death of Callixtus III, James of Portugal participated in the conclave that elected Pius II as pope. He was appointed a Knight of the Order of the Golden Fleece, number 58, at the 9th Chapter of the order, held in 1456 at The Hague.

The Portuguese art historian António Bélard da Fonseca, in his multi-volume O Mistério dos Painéis (1957–1967), controversially claimed that it is James of Portugal, and not Vincent of Saragossa, who is depicted as the radiant saintly figure in the central panels of the Saint Vincent Panels of Nuno Gonçalves.

== Death and burial ==
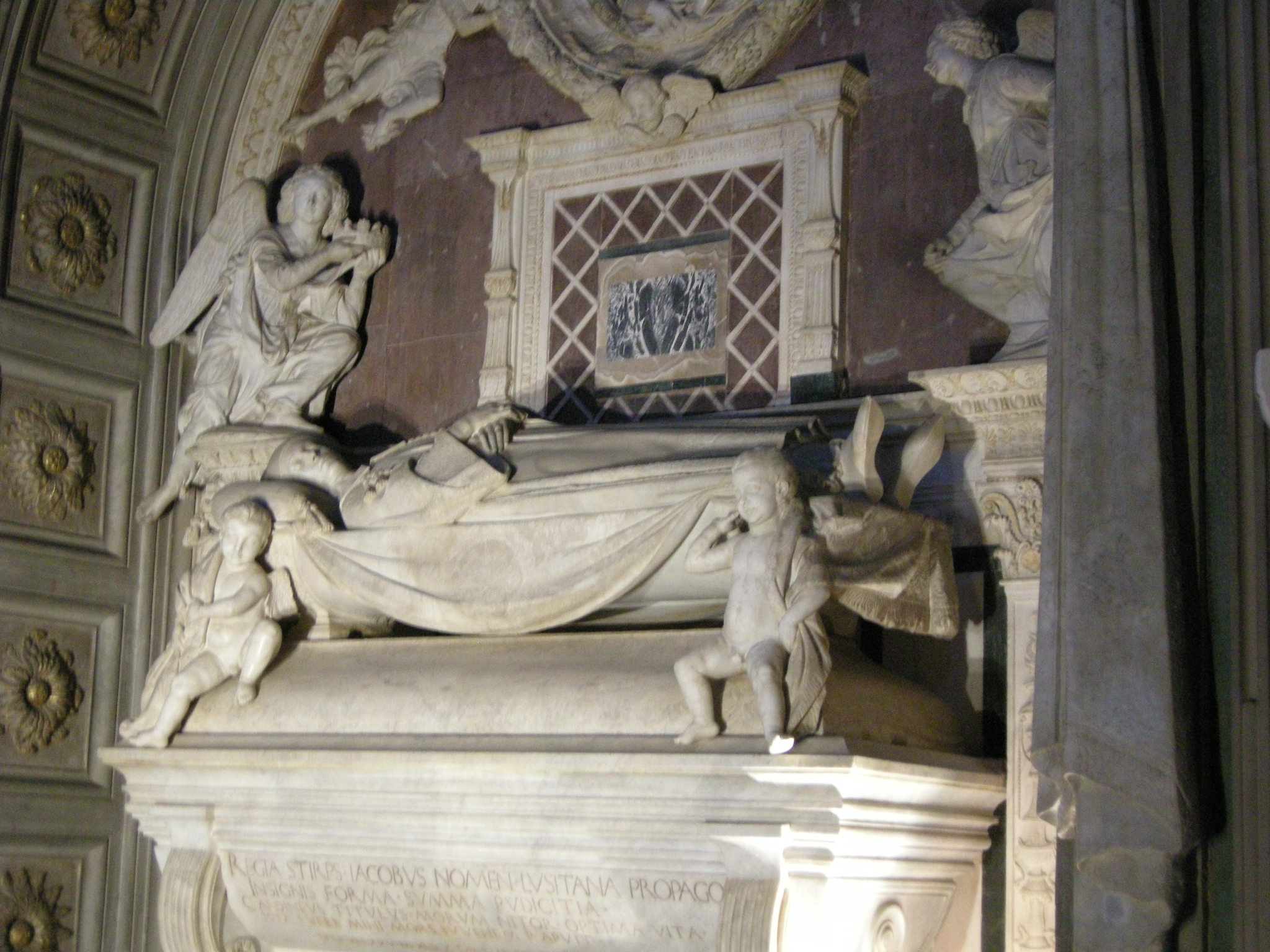
His tomb by Antonio Rossellino

While travelling from Rome to Austria to rally support for a new crusade, James fell ill and died in Florence on 27 August 1459, at the age of twenty-six. He was buried in the basilica of San Miniato al Monte in Florence, the only tomb in that church. Some of the best artists in Renaissance Florence were commissioned to design and decorate the chapel of the "Cardinale del Portogallo" in San Miniato, including the Cardinal of Portugal's altarpiece by the Pollaiuolo brothers.

== Ancestry ==
Ancestors of James of Portugal

8. Peter I of Portugal
4. John I of Portugal
9. Teresa Lourenço
2. Peter, Duke of Coimbra
10. John of Gaunt, 1st Duke of Lancaster
5. Philippa of Lancaster
11. Blanche of Lancaster
1. Jaime of Aviz, 6th Archbishop of Lisbon
12. Peter II, Count of Urgell
6. James II, Count of Urgell
13. Margaret of Montferrat
3. Isabella of Urgell
14. Peter IV of Aragon
7. Isabella of Aragon
15. Sibila de Fortià

Catholic Church titles
Preceded by Fortigario di Piacenza	Apostolic Administrator of Arras; 1453	Succeeded by Jean Jouffroy
Preceded by Luís Coutinho	Apostolic Administrator of Lisbon; 1453–1459	Succeeded by Afonso Nogueira
Preceded by	Apostolic Administrator of Paphos; 1457–1459	Succeeded by Guillaume Gonème
