= Peter, Constable of Portugal =

Peter of Coimbra Peter V of Aragon (disputed)
- Constable of Portugal; Count of Barcelona
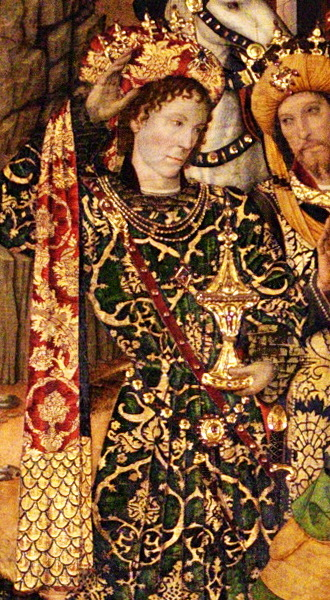
- Portrait in the Chapel of Santa Àgata, 1464-1465
- Born: 1429
- Died: 30 June 1466 (aged 36–37); Granollers
- Burial: Santa Maria del Mar Church, Barcelona
- House: Aviz
- Father: Peter, Duke of Coimbra
- Mother: Isabella of Urgell

Peter of Coimbra (also known as Peter the Constable) (Portuguese: Pedro, pronounced [ˈpeðɾu]; c. 1429 – Granollers, 30 June 1466), sometimes known as Peter V of Aragon or the Intruder King (el Rey Intruso), was the son of Infante Peter, Duke of Coimbra, who became the fifth Constable of Portugal and third Grand Master of the Order of Saint Benedict of Aviz. The Consell de Cent later granted Peter the Crown of Aragon, which he claimed from 1463 to 1466 in opposition to John II. His status as king of Aragon, however, along with that of John II's other challengers, is disputed.

== Early life and background ==
Peter was the eldest son of Infante Peter, Duke of Coimbra and Isabella of Urgell. His father served as regent of the Kingdom of Portugal for Afonso V between 1439 and 1448.

Peter inherited a claim to the Aragonese throne through his maternal grandfather James II, Count of Urgell, who was the last male descendant of the House of Barcelona and heir to the Crown of Aragon by the rights of agnatic primogeniture.

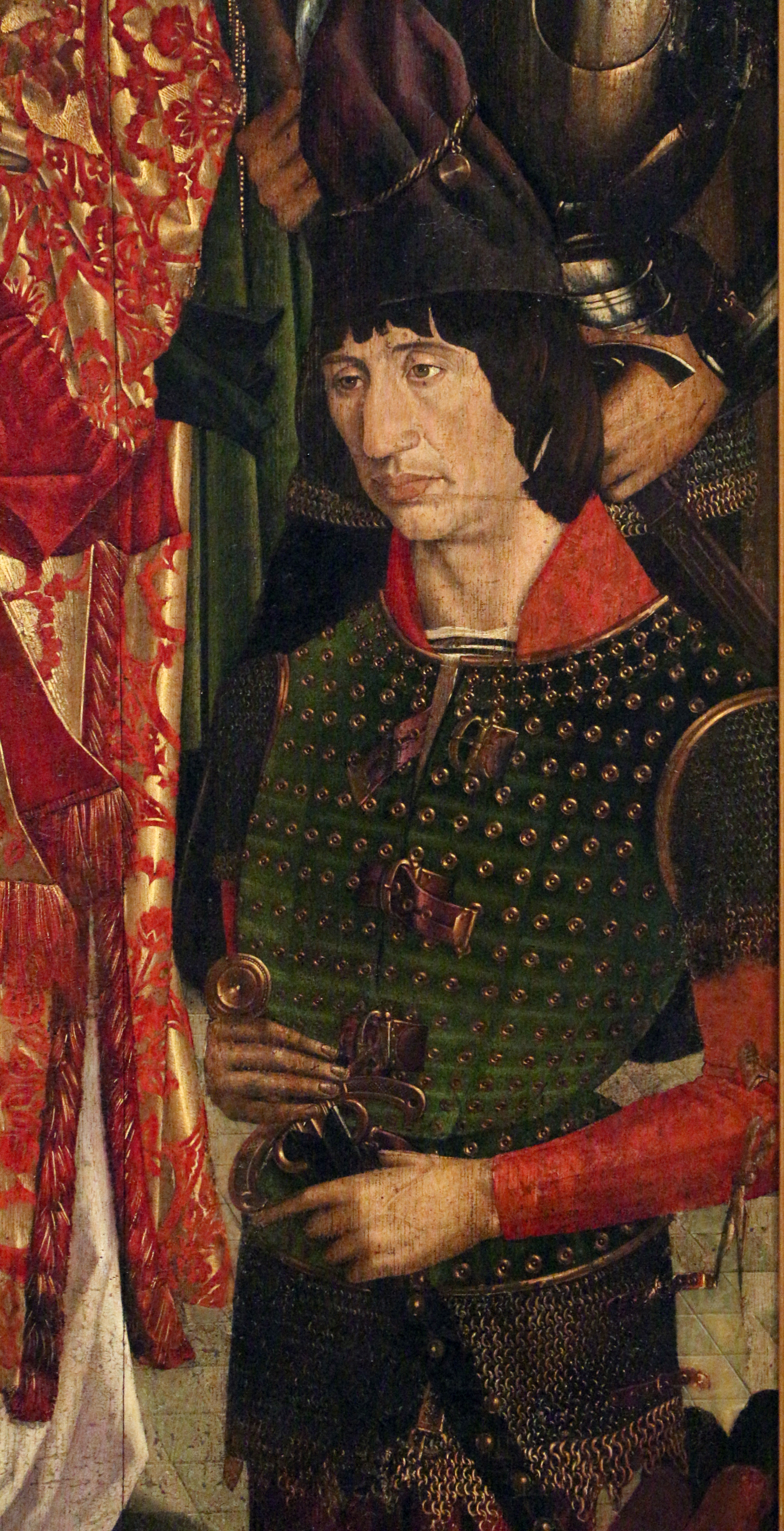
Possible depiction of Peter in the Saint Vincent Panels.

== Maturity ==
In 1443, after the death of his cousin Infante Diogo and by the instigation of his father, Peter was elected the Constable of Portugal, enraging Afonso, Marquis of Valença, the son of his half-uncle Afonso, 1st Duke of Braganza, who believed the title was rightfully his. This political move, along with Afonso V's marriage to Isabella of Coimbra, Peter's sister, instead of the granddaughter of the Duke of Braganza, caused significant conflict between the two parties. In the same year, after the death of his uncle Ferdinand, Peter was granted the mastership of the order of Avis.

In 1448, when King Afonso V of Portugal became of age and took reign, the Duke of Coimbra stepped down as regent. Afonso V, because of influence of the Duke of Braganza, who became the political enemy of Peter's father, voided all laws created under Coimbra's regency. Peter was stripped of both the constableship and the master of Avis. Intense disagreement and intrigue led to the Battle of Alfarrobeira, culminating in the death of Pedro and the exile of his children. Unlike his siblings, who went to the court of their aunt Isabella in Burgundy, Peter fled to Castile.

Peter's exile in Castile constitutes the main period of his activity as a writer. Described as a disciple of Rodríguez de Padrón, he completed two projects, Satira de Infelice e Felice Vida and Tragédia de la insigne reina doña Isabel. The works are considered some of the earliest examples of sentimental fiction.

In 1456 or 1457, Peter reconciled with King Afonso V and the Duke of Braganza, thus allowing him to return to Portugal and reclaim all his family's previous possessions. Upon his return, he participated in several of Afonso's expeditions to northern Africa.

== King of Aragon ==
In 1463, the Catalan institutions, which were in civil war with John II of Aragon, offered their crown to Peter. He was crowned King of Aragon, Count of Barcelona, and King of Valencia by the Consell de Cent. He reigned de facto in the Principality of Catalonia and parts of the Kingdom of Aragon, but only de jure in Valencia, which was occupied by John II of Aragon. The territory under his control only included Barcelona, most of Catalonia and parts of Aragon.

With the support of his aunt Isabella, Duchess of Burgundy he became engaged to Margaret of York, sending her an engagement ring and a marriage contract. Margaret would later marry Isabella's son Charles the Bold.

== Death ==
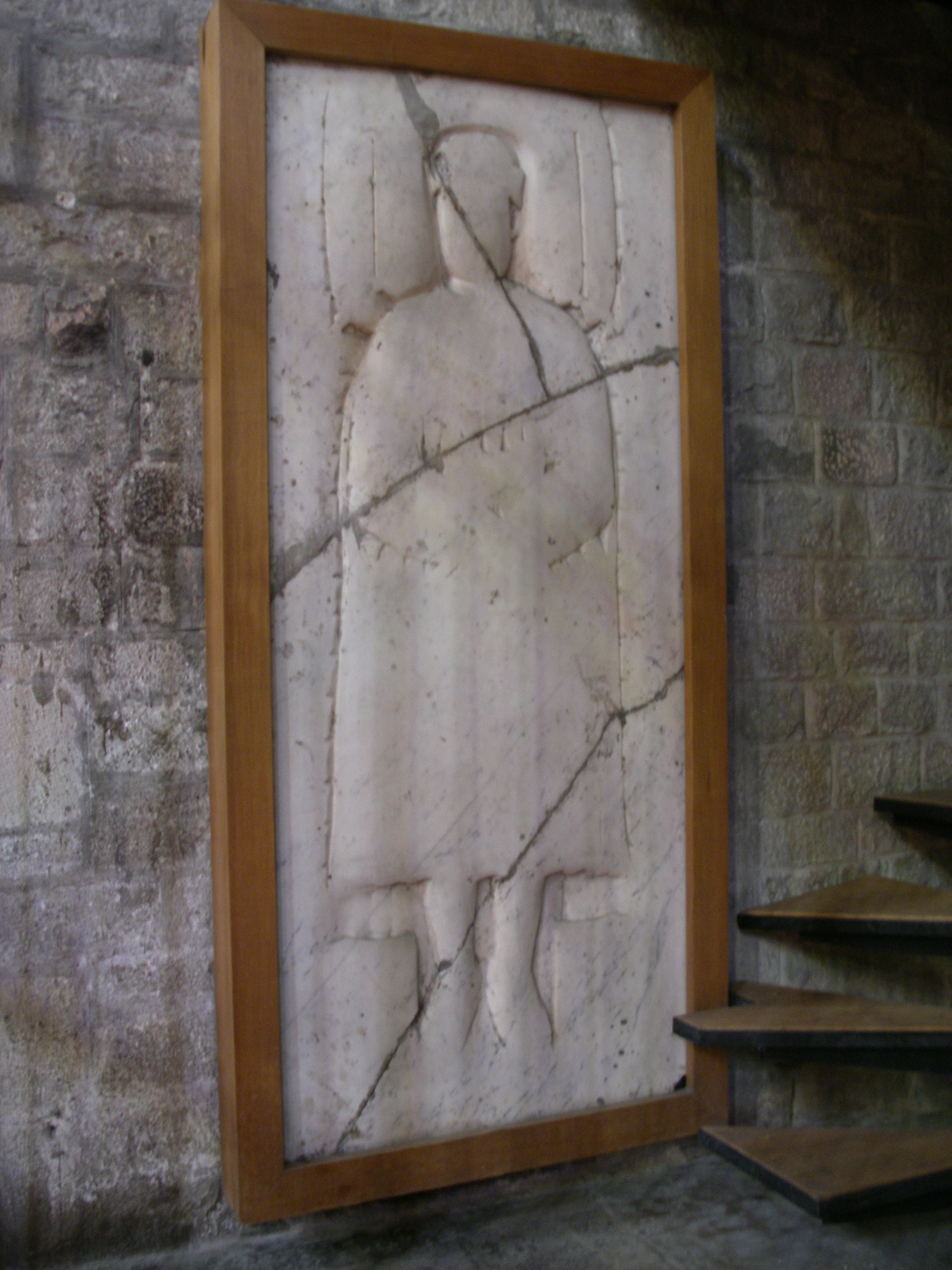
Peter's tomb at the Santa Maria del Mar Church in Barcelona, Catalonia.

After a period of ineffectual rulership, Peter died in 1466 of natural causes. He is buried in Church of Santa Maria del Mar in Barcelona, Catalonia. After his death, the Catalans offered the crown to René of Anjou.

== Ancestry ==
Ancestors of Peter, Constable of Portugal

8. Peter I of Portugal
4. John I of Portugal
9. Teresa Lourenço
2. Peter, Duke of Coimbra
10. John of Gaunt, 1st Duke of Lancaster
5. Philippa of Lancaster
11. Blanche of Lancaster
1. Peter, Constable of Portugal
12. Peter II of Urgell
6. James II, Count of Urgell
13. Margaret of Montferrat
3. Isabella of Urgell
14. Peter IV of Aragon
7. Isabella of Aragon
15. Sibila de Fortià

== Sources ==
- "Nobreza de Portugal e do Brasil" – Vol. I, pages 268–270. Published by Zairol Lda., Lisbon 1989.
- Berlin, Henry (2021). Alone Together: Poetics of the Passions in Late Medieval Iberia. University of Toronto Press.
- Elbl, Ivana (2022). "Friendship, Disasters, and Social Capital: The Silva Meneses, 1415-1481". Portuguese Studies Review. 30 (1): 39–82. Deals with Peter the Constable, his father the Duke of Coimbra, their allies and friends and servants.
- Francis, Anne F. (1979). Voyage of Re-Discovery: The Veneration of Saint Vincent. Exposition Press.
- Montero, Ana (2013). "A New Reading of Sátira de infelice e felice vida by don Pedro, Constable of Portugal" (PDF). La corónica: A Journal of Medieval Hispanic Languages, Literatures, and Cultures. doi:10.1353/cor.2013.0020.
- Rogers, Francis M. (1961). The Travels of the Infante Dom Pedro of Portugal. Harvard Studies in Romance Languages. Vol. XXVI. Cambridge: Harvard University Press.
- Vives, Jaime Vicens (2023). Approaches to the History of Spain. University of California Press.

Peter, Constable of Portugal House of Aviz Cadet branch of the House of Burgundy Born: 1429 Died: 30 June 1466
Titles in pretence
Preceded by Henry IV of Castile	King of Aragon; Count of Barcelona (in opposition to John II); 1463–1466	Succeeded by René of Anjou
