= John II of Portugal =

King of Portugal from 1481 to 1495

John II
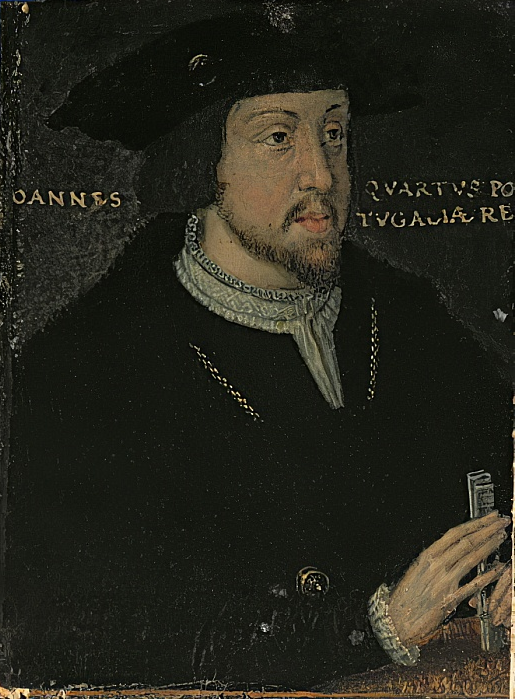
- Portrait of John II, Kunsthistorisches Museum, Vienna

King of Portugal
- Reign: 28 August 1481 – 25 October 1495
- Acclamation: 31 August 1481, Sintra
- Predecessor: Afonso V
- Successor: Manuel I
- Reign: 10 November 1477 – 14 November 1477
- Acclamation: 10 November 1477, Santarém
- Predecessor: Afonso V
- Successor: Afonso V
- Born: 3 May 1455; São Jorge Castle, Portugal
- Died: 25 October 1495 (aged 40); Alvor, Algarve
- Burial: Monastery of Batalha
- Spouse: Eleanor of Viseu (m. 1470)
- Issue Detail: Afonso, Prince of Portugal; Illegitimate: George of Lencastre
- House: Aviz
- Father: Afonso V of Portugal
- Mother: Isabella of Coimbra

John II (Note: Portuguese: João II; rendered as Joam in Archaic Portuguese; [ʒuˈɐ̃w]) (3 May 1455 – 25 October 1495), also known as the Perfect Prince, (Note: Portuguese: o Príncipe Perfeito) was King of Portugal from 1481 until his death in 1495, and also for a brief time in 1477. He is known for reestablishing the power of the Portuguese monarchy, reinvigorating the economy of Portugal, and renewing the Portuguese exploration of Africa and Asia.

== Early life ==
Born in Lisbon on 3 May 1455, John was the second son of Afonso V of Portugal and Isabella of Coimbra. (Note: The couple's first son, also named John, died in 1451.) At one month old, on 25 June 1455, he was declared legitimate heir to the crown and received an oath of allegiance from the three estates.

Isabella of Coimbra died in December 1455. John and his older sister, Joanna, were raised by a governess, Beatriz de Vilhena. Their upbringing was also influenced by their aunt, Philippa of Coimbra.

In 1468, Afonso V and Henry IV of Castile attempted to arrange a double marriage in which John would marry Henry's daughter, Joanna, and Afonso would marry Henry's half-sister and heir-presumptive, Isabella of Castile. However, Isabella refused to consent to the arrangement. Instead, John married Eleanor of Viseu, his first cousin and the eldest daughter of Ferdinand, Duke of Viseu, on 22 January 1471. John was fond of Eleanor, but did not approve of the match because of the Infanta's dynastic insignificance.

=== Early campaigns ===
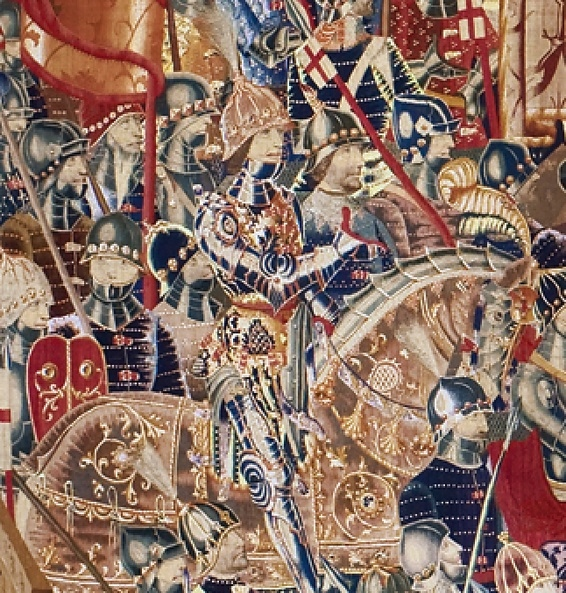
Prince John depicted on horseback in one of the Pastrana Tapestries. The tapestries were commissioned by Afonso V to celebrate Portuguese victories in Morocco.

John accompanied his father in the campaigns in northern Africa and was knighted after the victory in the Conquest of Arzila in August 1471.

==== Participation in the War of the Castilian Succession ====
Following the death of Henry IV of Castile in December 1474 and the accession of his half-sister, Isabella, a faction of the nobility hostile to Isabella offered the Castilian crown to Afonso V, provided he wed Henry's daughter, Joanna. John urged his father to marry Joanna and invade Castile, but leading nobles, namely the Marquis of Vila Viçosa, opposed this conviction. Afonso sent an envoy to assess support for Joanna's cause and after receiving "favorable accounts respecting the partisans of the Infanta", he ordered war preparations to be made for the following spring.

On 12 May 1475, Afonso and John entered Castile with an army of 5,600 cavalry and 14,000 foot soldiers. Afonso V proceeded to Palencia to meet Joanna while John returned home to govern the kingdom. On May 25, Joanna and Afonso were betrothed and proclaimed sovereigns of Castile. (Note: The formal marriage was delayed because Joanna was Afonso's niece and the two had not yet received a papal dispensation.) In the same month, John's wife, Eleanor, gave birth to the couple's only child to survive infancy, Afonso.

In late 1475, Afonso, with only a fragment of his army remaining, wrote letters to John imploring him to provide reinforcements. John raised an army and left for Castile again in January 1476, appointing Eleanor regent of the kingdom.

In March 1476, at Toro, Afonso V and John and some 8,000 men faced Castilian forces of similar size led by Isabella's husband, Ferdinand of Aragon, Cardinal Mendoza and the Duke of Alba. King Afonso V was beaten by the left and center of King Ferdinand's army and fled from the battlefield. John defeated the Castilian right wing, recovered the lost Portuguese Royal standard, and held the field, but overall the battle was indecisive. Despite its uncertain outcome, the Battle of Toro represented a great political victory for Isabella and Ferdinand and Afonso's prospects for obtaining the Castilian crown were severely damaged. John promptly returned to Portugal to disband the remnants of his army, arriving the first week of April.

=== De facto rule ===
Months after the Battle of Toro, in August 1476, Afonso V travelled to France hoping to obtain the assistance of King Louis XI in his fight against Castile. In September 1477, disheartened that his efforts to secure support had proved fruitless, Afonso abdicated the throne and embarked on a pilgrimage to Jerusalem. He was eventually persuaded to return to Portugal, where he arrived in November 1477. John had been proclaimed king days prior to Afonso's arrival, but relinquished his new title and insisted that his father reassume the crown.

From 1477 to 1481, John and Afonso V were "practically corulers." John, given control of overseas policy in 1474 and concerned with consolidating Portuguese control of Africa, played a major role in negotiating the Treaty of Alcáçovas (1479) with Spain that concluded the War of the Castilian Succession and ensured Portugal hegemony in the Atlantic south of the Canary Islands. The treaty also arranged for the marriage of John's son, Afonso, to the eldest daughter of the Catholic Monarchs, Isabella.

Following his father's death on 28 August 1481, John was proclaimed King of Portugal and crowned at Sintra on 31 August.

== Reign ==
=== Consolidation of power ===
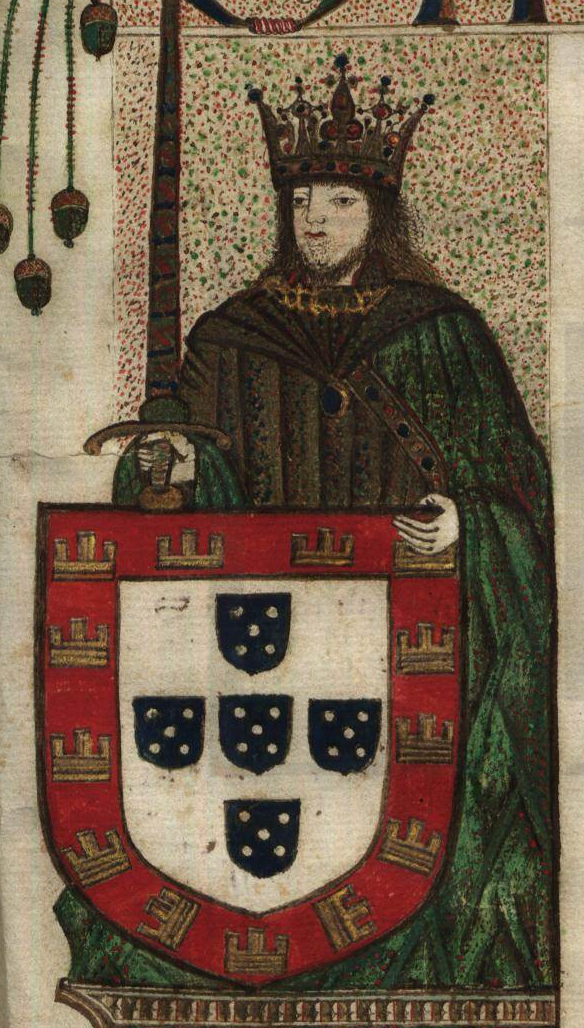
Miniature of King John II in the Livro dos Copos, a manuscript written between 1490 and 1498

After his official accession to the throne, John strived to diminish the power and influence of the nobility that had greatly accumulated during his father's reign. In 1481, he assembled the Cortes in Evora and held a grand oath-taking ceremony in which magnates and other subjects were required to swear allegiance to him as their unequivocal superior. The ceremony was perceived as humiliating by members of the upper nobility who were accustomed to the feudal tradition of acknowledging the king as simply first among equals. At the Cortes, John further enraged nobles by declaring that property title deeds would undergo examination to ensure their validity, as opposed to being confirmed in mass. After representatives of commoners voiced grievances concerning abuses committed by the nobility and clergy, he deprived nobles of their right to administer justice on their estates, instead authorizing crown officials or corregedors to inspect and dispense justice throughout the realm.

Such aggressive assertions of royal supremacy roused resentment amongst the nobility. By 1482, Fernando, Duke of Braganza, the wealthiest nobleman in Portugal, and his followers had begun conspiring for John's deposition, allegedly receiving support from the Catholic Monarchs. John responded by having Fernando arrested, tried and convicted of twenty-two counts of treason, and publicly beheaded in June 1483. Afterwards, the assets of the House of Braganza were confiscated and the family fled to Castile.

Braganza's execution caused even more intrigue among the upper-nobility, who rallied behind Diogo, Duke of Viseu, John's cousin and brother to his Queen Consort, Eleanor. In September 1484, John summoned Diogo to his private chambers, confronted him with evidence of treason, and stabbed him to death. (Note: John allowed Diogo's younger brother, Manuel, to inherit his titles and estate. Manuel would eventually succeed John as King of Portugal.) Other ringleaders involved in the plot were persecuted. Ultimately, John succeeded in enriching the Crown by executing or exiling most of Portugal's feudal lords and confiscating their estates. For the rest of his reign, he kept the creation of titles to a bare minimum.

=== Economy and administration ===
Under John's direction, commercial activity in Africa became a crown monopoly. The immense profits generated by African ventures enabled the king to fund exploration expeditions, reduce his reliance on the cortes for financial support, and strengthen the monarchy's power over the nobility. In 1484, John began minting gold Justo coins that depicted him seated on a throne, facing forward in full armor and holding a sword.

John established a new court called the Mesa or Tribunal do Desembargo do Paço to supervise petitions for pardon, privileges, freedoms, and legislation. He also instituted annual elections for the judges, clerks, and hospital stewards under federal jurisdiction. His attempts to centralize hospitals across Portugal were not implemented fully but paved the way for the radical reforms introduced during the reign of Manuel I.

=== Exploration ===
John II famously restored the policies of Atlantic exploration, reviving and broadening the work of his great-uncle, Henry the Navigator. The Portuguese explorations were his main priority in government, patronising both local and foreign men, such as João Afonso de Aveiro and Martin Behaim, to further his goals. Portuguese explorers pushed south along the known coast of Africa with the purpose of discovering the maritime route to India and breaking into the spice trade. During John II's reign, the following achievements were realised: (Note: The true extent of Portuguese explorations has been the subject of academic debate. It is often alleged that some navigations were kept secret for fear of competition by neighbouring Castile. The archives of this period were mainly destroyed in the fire after the 1755 Lisbon earthquake, and what was not destroyed during the earthquake was either stolen or destroyed during the Peninsular War or otherwise lost.)

- 1482 – Foundation of the coastal fortress and trade post of São Jorge da Mina.
- 1484 – Discovery of the Congo River by Diogo Cão.
- 1488 – Discovery and passage of the Cape of Good Hope by Bartolomeu Dias in Mossel Bay.
- 1493 – Start of the settlement of the São Tomé and Príncipe islands by Álvaro Caminha.
- Funding of land expeditions by Afonso de Paiva and Pêro da Covilhã to India and Ethiopia in search of the kingdom of Prester John.

In 1484, John appointed a Maritime Advisory Committee, the Junta dos Mathematicos, to supervise navigational efforts and provide explorers with charts and instruments. Around the same time, Christopher Columbus proposed his planned voyage to John. The king relegated Columbus's proposal to the Committee, who rejected it, correctly, on the grounds that Columbus's estimate for a voyage of 2,400 nmi was only a quarter of what it should have been. In 1488, Columbus again appealed to the court of Portugal, and John II again granted him an audience. That meeting also proved unsuccessful, in part because not long afterwards Bartolomeu Dias returned to Portugal with news of his successful rounding of the southern tip of Africa (near the Cape of Good Hope). Columbus then sought an audience with the Catholic Monarchs and eventually secured their support.

==== Conflict with Castile ====
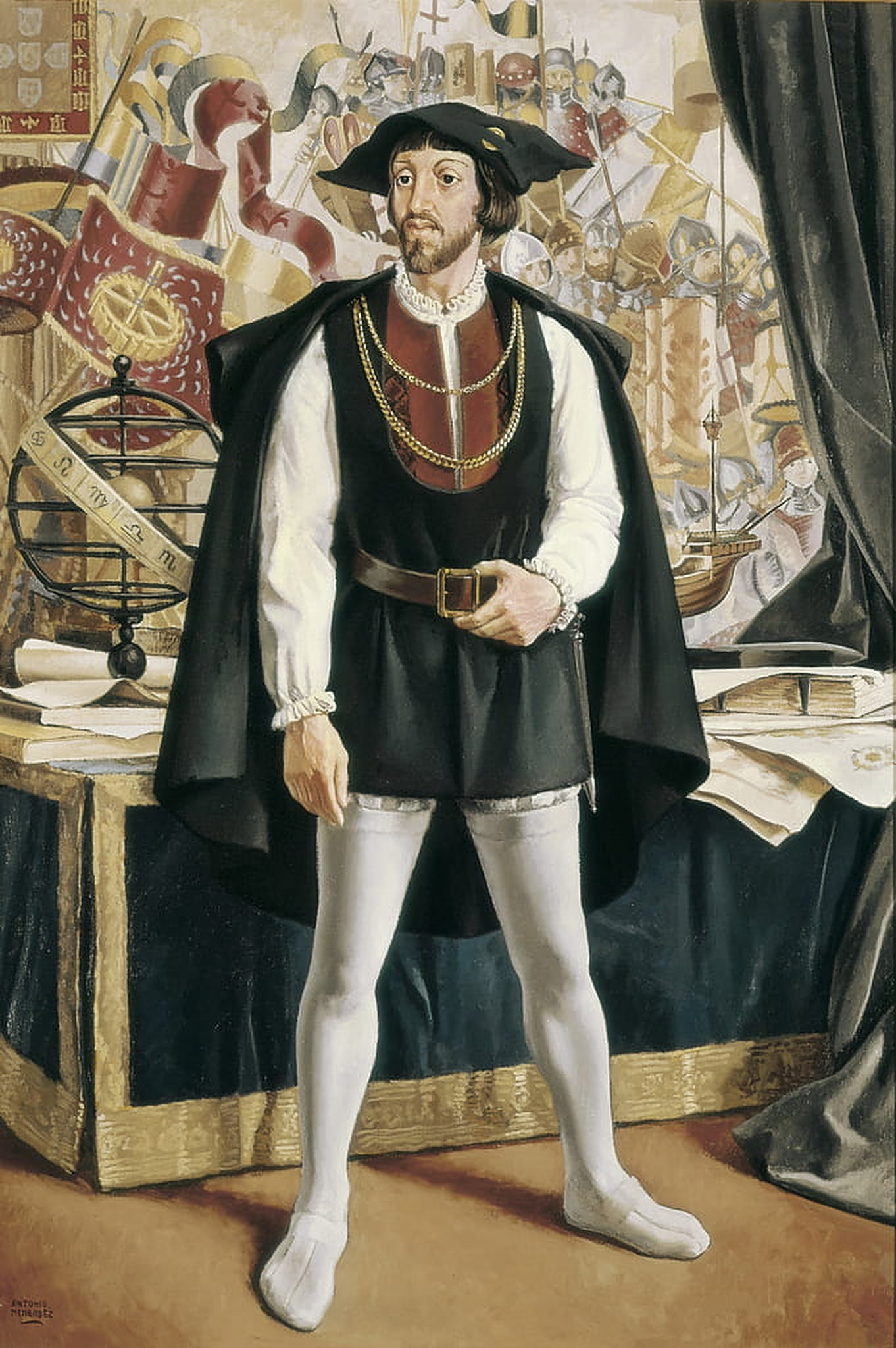
Portrait of King John II at the Navy Museum

While returning home from his first voyage early in 1493, Columbus was driven by storm into the port of Lisbon. John II welcomed him warmly but asserted that under the Treaty of Alcáçovas previously signed with Spain, Columbus's discoveries lay within Portugal's sphere of influence. The king then prepared a fleet under Francisco de Almeida to claim the new islands. Anxious to avoid war, the Catholic Monarchs arranged negotiations in the small Spanish town of Tordesillas. The result of this meeting would be the famous Treaty of Tordesillas, which sought to divide all newly discovered lands in the New World between Spain and Portugal.

=== Religious policy ===
John sanctioned several anti-Jewish laws at the behest of parliamentary representatives, including restrictions on Jewish clothing and the emancipation of Christian converts owned by Jews. However, the king's personal attitude towards Portuguese Jews has been described as pragmatic, as he valued their economic contributions and defended them against unjust harassment.

After the Catholic Monarchs expelled Jews from Castile and Aragon in 1492, John authorized the admission of tens of thousands of Jews into Portugal at the price of eight cruzados a head but refused to let them stay longer than eight months. Of the some 20,000 families that entered Portugal, only 600 of the most affluent Castilian Jewish families succeeded in obtaining permanent residence permits. Jews unable to leave the country within the specified interval (often the result of poverty) were reduced to slavery and were not liberated until the reign of John's successor, Manuel. Many (Note: Soyer (2009) explains, "Jewish sources offer different estimations as to the number of children who were sent by João II to São Tomé. Rabbi Capsali states that 5,000 'boys' were taken to São Tomé but the numbers provided by other sources are considerably lower. Abraham ben Solomon Torrutiel (1482–?) believed that there were 800 children, including both boys and girls, whilst an anonymous Jewish chronicler alludes to 700. The most credible estimation may be that offered by Valentim Fernandes, a German printer who established himself in Portugal in 1495 and wrote a description of the islands based on the testimony of sailors who had visited it. Valentim Fernandes's description of São Tomé was published in 1510 and in it he asserts that the Jewish children who arrived on the island had originally numbered 2,000, of whom only 600 had survived into adulthood.") children of the enslaved Castilian Jews were seized from their parents and deported to the African island of São Tomé in order to be raised there as Christians and serve as colonists.

=== Succession and death ===
In July 1491, John's only legitimate child, Prince Afonso, died in a horse accident, confronting Portugal with a succession crisis. The king wanted his illegitimate son Jorge to succeed him but Queen Eleanor was intent on securing succession for her younger brother Manuel, the legal heir presumptive. Following bitter disputes with Eleanor and a failed petition to Rome to have Jorge legitimized, John finally recognized Manuel as his heir in his will while on his deathbed in September 1495.

John died of dropsy at Alvor on 25 October 1495 and was succeeded by Manuel I. He was initially interred at the Silves Cathedral, but his remains were transferred to the Monastery of Batalha in 1499.

== Legacy ==
The nickname the Perfect Prince is a posthumous appellation that is intended to refer to Niccolò Machiavelli's work The Prince. John II is considered to have lived his life exactly according to the writer's idea of a perfect prince. Nevertheless, he was admired as one of the greatest European monarchs of his time. Isabella I of Castile often referred to him as El Hombre (The Man).

The Italian scholar Poliziano wrote a letter to John II that paid him a profound homage:

to render you thanks on behalf of all who belong to this century, which now favours of your quasi-divine merits, now boldly competing with ancient centuries and all Antiquity.

Indeed, Poliziano considered his achievements to be more meritorious than those of Alexander the Great or Julius Caesar. He offered to write an epic work giving an account of John II accomplishments in navigation and conquests. The king replied in a positive manner in a letter of 23 October 1491, but delayed the commission.

== In popular culture ==
- In the TV series Christopher Columbus (1985) he is played by Max von Sydow.
- In the film Christopher Columbus: The Discovery (1992) he is played by Mathieu Carrière.
- He appears in Civilization IV (as João II), leading the Portuguese.
- In the TV series Isabel played by Álvaro Monje

== Marriage and descendants ==
Name	Birth	Death	Notes
By Leonor of Viseu (2 May 1458 – 17 November 1525; married in January 1471)
Infante Afonso	18 May 1475	13 July 1491	Prince of Portugal. Died in a horse riding accident. Because of the premature death of the prince, the throne was inherited by Manuel of Viseu, Duke of Beja, son of Ferdinand, Duke of Viseu, who reigned as Manuel I, 14th King of Portugal.
Stillborn	1483	1483	Stillborn son, born in 1483.
By Ana de Mendonça (c. 1460-?)
Jorge	21 August 1481	22 July 1550	Natural son known as Jorge de Lancastre, Duke of Coimbra.

== Ancestry ==
Ancestors of John II of Portugal

8. John I of Portugal (= 12)
4. Edward I of Portugal
9. Philippa of Lancaster (= 13)
2. Afonso V of Portugal
10. Ferdinand I of Aragon
5. Eleanor of Aragon
11. Eleanor of Alburquerque
1. John II of Portugal
12. John I of Portugal (= 8)
6. Peter, Duke of Coimbra
13. Philippa of Lancaster (= 9)
3. Isabel of Coimbra
14. James II, Count of Urgell
7. Isabella of Urgell
15. Isabella of Aragon

== Notes ==
John II of Portugal House of Aviz Cadet branch of the House of Burgundy Born: 3 March 1455 Died: 25 October 1495
Regnal titles
Preceded by Afonso V	King of Portugal; 1477	Succeeded by Afonso V
Preceded by Afonso V	King of Portugal; 1481–1495	Succeeded by Manuel I
Portuguese royalty
Preceded by Joanna	Prince of Portugal; 1455–1477	Succeeded by Afonso
Preceded by Afonso	Prince of Portugal; 1477–1481	Succeeded by Afonso
