= Afonso, Hereditary Prince of Portugal =

Afonso
- Hereditary Prince of Portugal
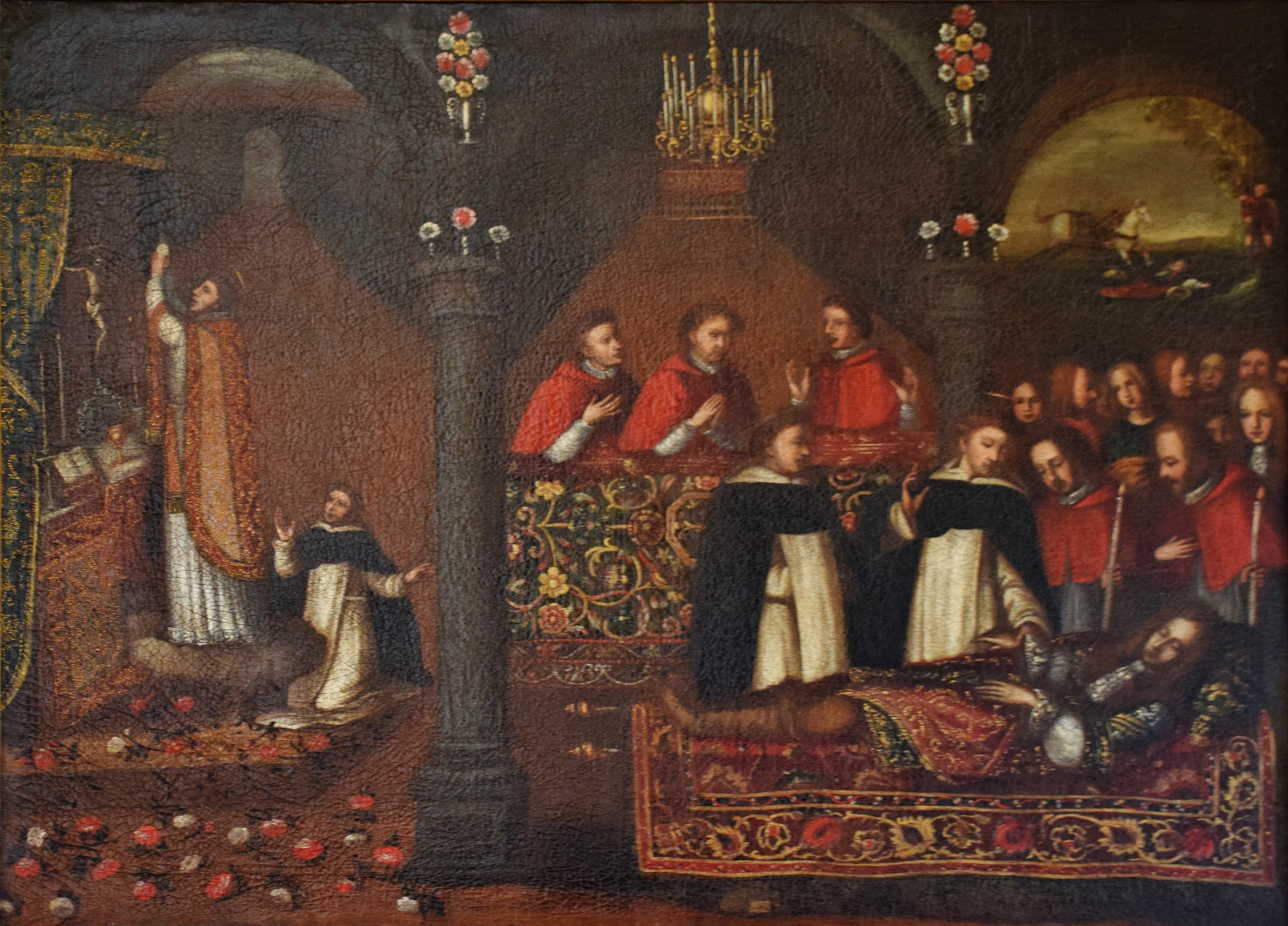
- The Death of Prince Afonso
- Born: 18 May 1475
- Died: 13 July 1491 (aged 16); Santarém District
- Burial: Batalha Monastery
- Spouse: Isabella of Aragon (m. 1490)
- House: Aviz
- Father: John II of Portugal
- Mother: Eleanor of Viseu

Afonso, Hereditary Prince of Portugal (Portuguese pronunciation: [ɐˈfõsu]; 18 May 1475 – 13 July 1491) was the heir apparent to the throne of Portugal. He was born in Lisbon, Portugal, and died in a horse-riding accident on the banks of the river Tagus.

== Early life ==
Born on 18 May 1475 in Lisbon, Afonso was the only son of Prince John of Portugal and Eleanor of Viseu. He was named after his grandfather, King Afonso V. At the time of Afonso's birth, Prince John and the king were campaigning in the War of Castilian Succession, during which Afonso V invaded Castile, married his niece Joanna la Beltraneja, and asserted her claim to the Castilian throne against Isabella I of Castile.

== Marriage ==
The war with Castile was concluded with the Treaty of Alcáçovas in 1479. Under its terms, King Afonso renounced his claim to the throne of Castile, while Castile recognized Portuguese hegemony in the Atlantic. The treaty also provided for the marriage of the Infante Afonso to Isabella, the eldest daughter of the Catholic Monarchs. To guarantee compliance with the agreement, both crowns entrusted their children to the care of Infanta Beatriz, Duchess of Viseu, Afonso's maternal grandmother, at her court in Moura. In 1480, the five-year-old Afonso was sent there, and in the early months of the following year the ten-year-old Isabella joined him, remaining in Moura for about two years.

Prince John and Eleanor were not permitted to visit their son in Moura and instead remained in Beja, where they received daily reports on his well-being. In August 1481, John succeeded his father as king and young Afonso became heir apparent to the throne. John grew increasingly concerned about the influence that the House of Braganza might exert over his son in Moura, particularly because Beatriz's son-in-law was Fernando II, Duke of Braganza, and sought to bring the Tercerias de Moura to an early conclusion. In May 1483, Afonso and Isabella were returned to their respective parents.

The wedding, by proxy, took place ten years later in the spring of 1490 in Seville. On 19 November of that year, Isabella arrived in Badajoz where she was welcomed by Afonso's uncle, Manuel, the future King Manuel I of Portugal, whom she would eventually marry six years after her husband's death. Afonso and Isabella were reunited in Elvas on 22 November and, on the following day, Isabella met her mother-in-law, Queen Eleanor, in the Convento do Espinheiro in Évora, where the court had gathered to ratify the marriage that had been celebrated earlier in Seville.

This wedding had the blessings of both Kingdoms. The queen of Castile, whose mother and nurse were Portuguese, wanted to strengthen the ties with Portugal, and, at the same time, this would allow her to "keep an eye on and control the steps of her eternal rival, Joanna la Beltraneja", through her daughter.

== Death ==
Cloister of Batalha Monastery

In July 1491, the royal family was spending the summer in the Santarém District near the banks of the River Tagus. King John invited his son to swim with him on 12 July 1491. The young prince refused the invitation at first, but seeing that his father wanted him to keep him company, decided to join him. According to the chronicle of Rui de Pina:

... na força do correr, o cavalo do príncipe caiu, e o levou debaixo de si, onde logo de improviso ficou como morto, sem fala e sem sentidos. ("... running at a great speed, the Prince's horse fell, dragging (the prince) under him, where he remained, seemingly dead, without speaking and having lost his senses").

Afonso was carried to the nearest dwelling, a fisherman's hut, where his family soon gathered at his bedside. He remained unconscious until his death on 13 July 1491.

As a sign of mourning, his parents decided to dress in black. The funeral rites were held at Batalha Monastery and Prince Afonso was buried there, also the resting place of his grandfather King Afonso V. His widow, Infanta Isabella, returned to Castile and even before the siege of Granada was lifted, she joined her parents in Íllora. The Catholic Monarchs abandoned the camp temporarily to be with their daughter and to console her.

== Aftermath ==
King John tried without success until the end of his life to legitimize the ten-year-old Jorge, Duke of Coimbra, his illegitimate son. His wife, Queen Eleanor, was adamantly against having the king's bastard son occupy the throne, an opinion shared by the Catholic Monarchs, who, like Queen Eleanor, supported the claims of the Duke of Beja, Eleanor's brother, as the heir to the throne. In 1494, King John, whose health had worsened, executed his last will in which named his cousin and brother-in-law, the Duke of Beja, his successor. King John died in October 1495 and, in 1497, his successor, the Duke of Beja, now King Manuel I of Portugal, married Isabella, Prince Afonso's widow. In 1502, the African island of Santo Antão was renamed Príncipe ('Prince') in honour of Afonso; the modern country of São Tomé and Príncipe still bears his title.

== Ancestry ==
Ancestors of Afonso, Hereditary Prince of Portugal

8. Edward I of Portugal (= 12)
4. Afonso V of Portugal
9. Eleanor of Aragon (= 13)
2. John II of Portugal
10. Peter, Duke of Coimbra
5. Isabel of Coimbra
11. Isabella of Urgell
1. Afonso, Hereditary Prince of Portugal
12. Edward I of Portugal (= 8)
6. Ferdinand, Duke of Viseu
13. Eleanor of Aragon (= 9)
3. Eleanor of Viseu
14. John, Constable of Portugal
7. Beatriz of Portugal
15. Isabel of Barcelos

== Bibliography ==
- Álvarez Palenzuela, Vicente Ángel (2006). "Paz con Portugal". La guerra civil castellana y el enfrentamiento con Portugal. (1475–1479) (in Spanish). Alicante: Biblioteca Virtual Miguel de Cervantes.
- Carabias Torres, Ana María (1994). Las relaciones entre Portugal y Castilla en la época de los descubrimientos y la expansión colonial (in Spanish). Universidad de Salamanca. ISBN 9788474817928.
- Fernández Álvarez, Manuel (2003). Isabel la Católica (in Spanish). Madrid: Espasa-Calpe. ISBN 84-670-1260-9.
- Rodrigues Oliveira, Ana (2010). Rainhas medievais de Portugal. Dezassete mulheres, duas dinastias, quatro séculos de História (in Portuguese). Lisbon: A esfera dos livros. ISBN 978-989-626-261-7.
- Sanceau, Elaine (1959). The Perfect Prince: A Biography of The King Dom Joao II. Livraria Civilizacao.

Afonso, Hereditary Prince of Portugal House of Aviz Cadet branch of the House of Burgundy Born: 18 May 1475 Died: 13 July 1491
| Preceded by John (II) | Hereditary Prince of Portugal; 1481 – 1491 | Succeeded by Manuel (I) |
