= Isabella of Urgell, Duchess of Coimbra =

Isabella of Urgell
- Duchess of Coimbra; Dame of Montemor
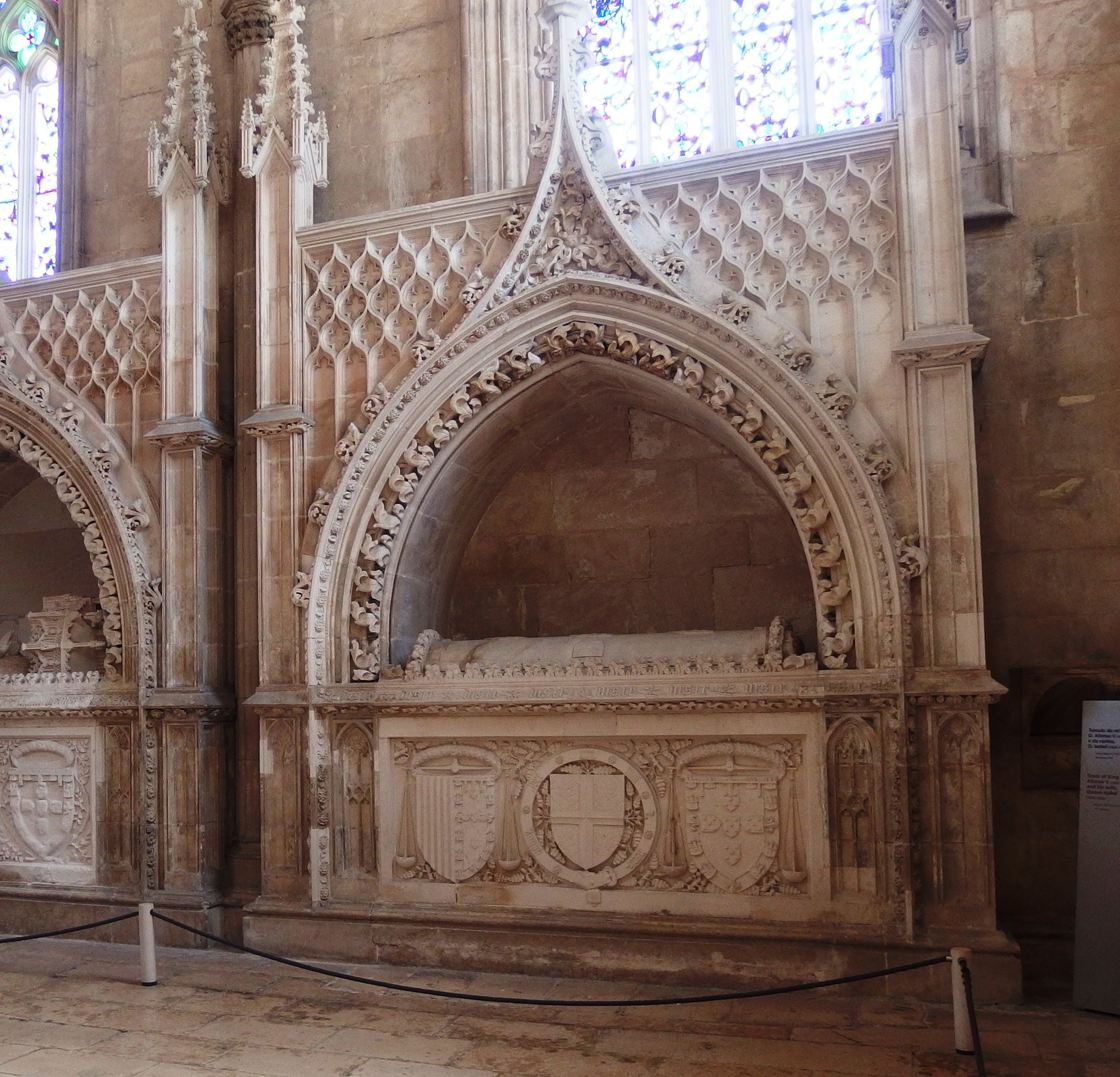
- Tomb of Peter and Isabella in Batalha Monastery
- Born: 12 March 1409; Balaguer, Catalonia, Aragon
- Died: 17 September 1459 (aged 50); Coimbra, Portugal
- Burial: Batalha Monastery
- Spouse: Infante Peter, Duke of Coimbra (m. 1428; died 1449)
- Issue: Peter, Constable of Portugal; John, Prince of Antioch; Isabella, Queen of Portugal; James, Archbishop of Lisbon; Beatrice, Lady of Ravenstein; Philippa of Coimbra
- House: Barcelona
- Father: James II, Count of Urgell
- Mother: Isabella of Aragon

Isabella of Urgell, Duchess of Coimbra (Spanish: Isabel) (12 March 1409 – 17 September 1459) was a Catalan noblewoman of the Urgell branch of the House of Barcelona. She was the wife of Infante Peter, Duke of Coimbra.

== Family ==
Isabella was born on 12 March 1409, the eldest daughter of James II, Count of Urgell, and Isabella of Aragon. Isabella was one of five children.

The county of Urgell was dissolved in 1413, following her father's revolt against the new King Ferdinand I of Aragon who had been chosen to succeed to the throne of Aragon in 1412 despite James being the closest legitimate agnate to the Royal House of Barcelona.

== Marriage ==
On 12 September 1428 at Alcolea de Cinca she married Infante Peter, Duke of Coimbra (9 December 1392 – 20 May 1449 at the Battle of Alfarrobeira), a younger son of John I of Portugal. During her husband's regency for his nephew, Afonso V of Portugal, the marriage of the couple's daughter Isabella to the King was arranged.

=== Issue ===
- Peter, Constable of Portugal (23 October 1429, Coimbra, Portugal – 29 June 1466) At the age of fourteen he became Constable of Portugal. In 1464, he was acclaimed King Peter V of Aragon.
- John of Coimbra, titular Prince of Antioch (1431, Coimbra, Portugal – 11 September 1457, Nicosia, Cyprus). On 26 February 1456, he married Queen Charlotte of Cyprus (28 June 1444 – 16 July 1487), as her first husband.
- Isabella of Coimbra (1 March 1432, Coimbra, Portugal – 2 December 1455). Married her cousin, King Afonso V of Portugal on 6 May 1447, as his first wife. They had three children, including King John II of Portugal.
- James of Coimbra, Cardinal and Archbishop-elect of Lisbon (17 September 1433, Coimbra, Portugal – 27 August 1459, Florence, Italy).
- Beatrice of Coimbra (21 November 1435, Coimbra, Portugal – 22 February 1462, Bruges). Married 13 May 1453 Adolph of Cleves, Lord of Ravenstein (28 June 1425 – 18 September 1492), as his first wife. Her death was attributed to poisoning.
- Philippa of Coimbra (1 June 1437, Coimbra, Portugal – 25 July 1493, Odivelas). She was a nun at the Convent of Odivelas.
- Catherine (circa 1448 – between 1462 and 1466).

== Widowhood and death ==
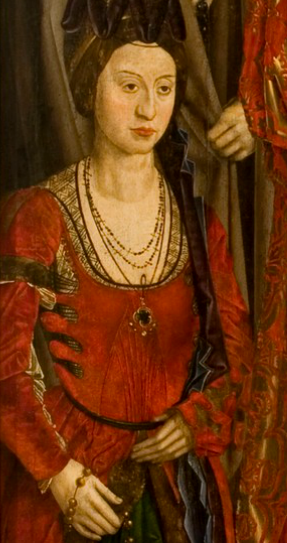
Isabella of Coimbra, eldest daughter of Isabella of Urgell, whose efforts were critical for the rehabilitation of the family.

Peter of Coimbra was regent of Portugal from 1439, and engineered the marriage of his young charge, Afonso V of Portugal with his daughter, Isabella of Coimbra in 1447. But he also gathered powerful enemies, most notably the House of Braganza, who ingratiated themselves with the young king and managed to drive Peter from power immediately after. The parties remained at odds and Portugal careened into civil war. After Peter of Coimbra was killed at the Battle of Alfarrobeira in May 1449, his family was immediately and relentlessly persecuted. Isabella of Urgell and her daughter Philippa went into hiding, while her other children were driven into exile abroad - Peter the Constable to Castile, and John, James and Beatrice to the Duchy of Burgundy, the lands of their aunt Isabella of Burgundy. The threats of the powerful Duke of Burgundy were conjoined to the pleas of Peter's daughter, the young queen Isabella of Coimbra, who pleaded her husband to have mercy on her family. Against the advice of the powerful Braganzas, Afonso V relented (partially) in 1450 and allowed the widowed duchess Isabella of Urgell to reside in Montemor-o-Velho and Tentúgal (Philippa was allowed to reside in a cloister in Odivelas, although apparently she later moved in with her mother). However, she continued to be harassed by the Braganzas - Afonso, Marquis of Valença reportedly tried to deprive the widowed duchess of her residence, which only the queen's renewed pleading prodded Afonso V to intercede on her behalf.

Isabella of Coimbra availed of the king's good mood after the birth of their son, the royal heir John (future king John II of Portugal), in May 1455, to engineer a complete and final rehabilitation of the rest of her family. Peter of Coimbra's remains were allowed to be re-buried at the Aviz dynasty necropolis at Batalha Monastery and the dowager-duchess Isabella of Urgell was granted a royal pension for the remainder of her years.

Isabella of Urgell died on 17 September 1459, at the monastery of Santa Cruz in Coimbra. Her remains were translated to Batalha, into the tomb of her rehabilitated husband.

Her father had died while imprisoned at Xàtiva in 1433.

== Ancestry ==
Ancestors of Isabella of Urgell, Duchess of Coimbra

8. James I, Count of Urgell
4. Peter II, Count of Urgell
9. Cécile of Comminges
6. James II, Count of Urgell
10. John II, Marquis of Montferrat
5. Margaret of Montferrat
11. Isabella of Majorca
1. Isabella of Urgell
12. Alfonso IV of Aragon
6. Peter IV of Aragon
13. Teresa d'Entença
3. Isabella of Aragon
14. Berenguer de Fortià
7. Sibila de Fortià
15. Francesca de Vilamarí
