= Beatrice of Coimbra =

Infanta Beatrice
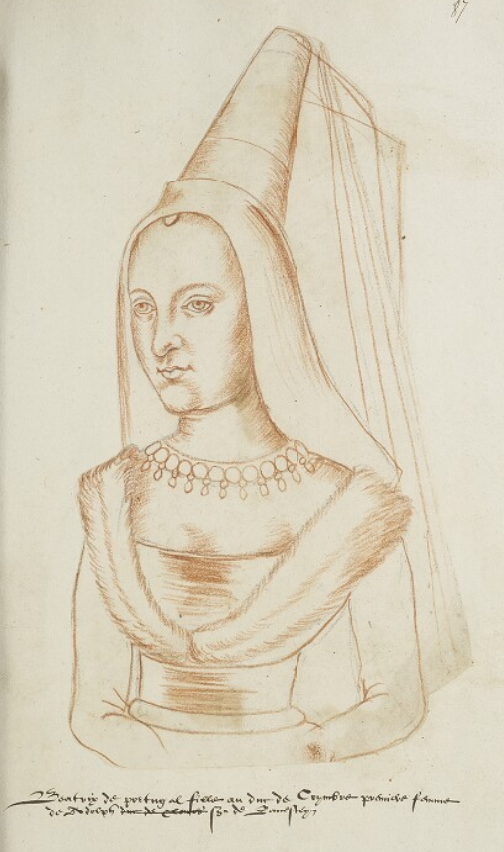
- Born: 1435
- Died: 1462 (aged 26–27); Bruges
- Spouse: Adolph of Cleves, Lord of Ravenstein (m. 1453)
- Issue: Philip of Cleves, Lord of Ravenstein; Louise of Cleves
- Father: Infante Peter, Duke of Coimbra
- Mother: Isabella of Urgell

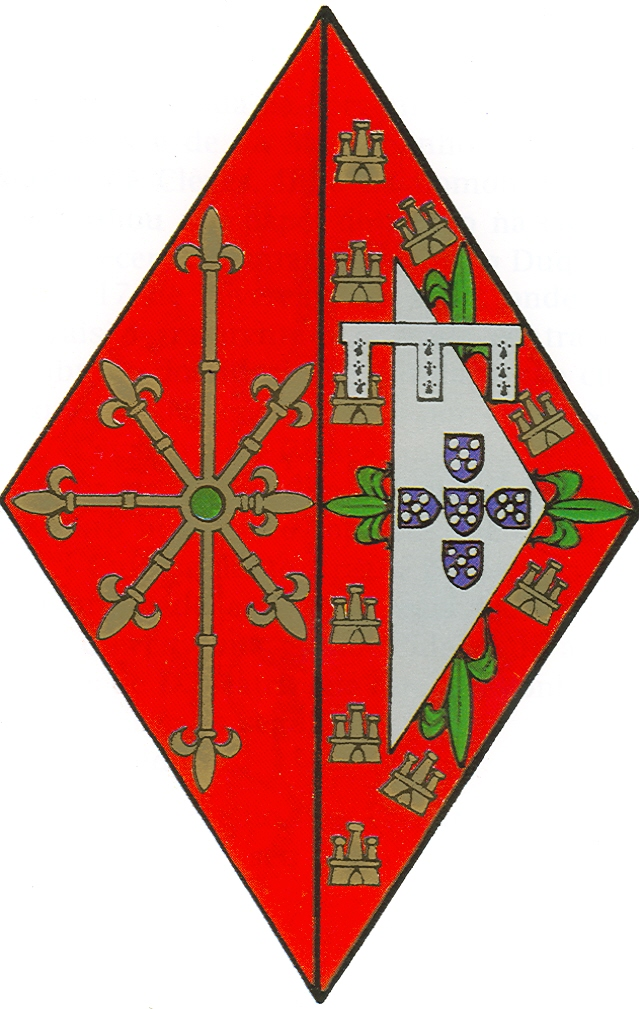
Coat of arms (Lisonja) of Infanta Beatrice of Coimbra, combining her father's arms (on the right) with her husband's (on the left)

Infanta Beatrice of Coimbra (1435–1462) was the fifth child of Infante Peter, Duke of Coimbra, and Isabella of Urgell.

After the Battle of Alfarrobeira, where her father's army was defeated by the Portuguese royal army, she left the country and took refuge in Burgundy, under her aunt's protection; Isabella of Portugal was married to Duke Philip III the Good.

In 1453, Beatrice married Adolph of Cleves, Lord of Ravenstein, nephew of the Duke Philip III the Good. They had issue:

- Philip of Cleves (1456–1528)
- Louise of Cleves (1457–1458)

She died in Bruges of suspected poisoning in 1462.

== Ancestry ==
Ancestors of Beatrice of Coimbra

8. Peter I of Portugal
4. John I of Portugal
9. Teresa Lourenço
2. Peter, Duke of Coimbra
10. John of Gaunt, 1st Duke of Lancaster
5. Philippa of Lancaster
11. Blanche of Lancaster
1. Beatrice of Coimbra
12. Peter II of Urgell
6. James II, Count of Urgell
13. Margaret of Montferrat
3. Isabella of Urgell
14. Peter IV of Aragon
7. Isabella of Aragon
15. Sibila de Fortià
