= Adolph of Cleves =

Adolph of Cleves may refer to:

- Adolph I, Count of Cleves
- Adolph I, Duke of Cleves
- Adolph of Cleves, Lord of Ravenstein
