= Peter of Urgell =

Peter of Urgell may refer to:

- Peter I of Urgell (died 1258)
- Peter II of Urgell (died 1408)
