= Philippa of Coimbra =

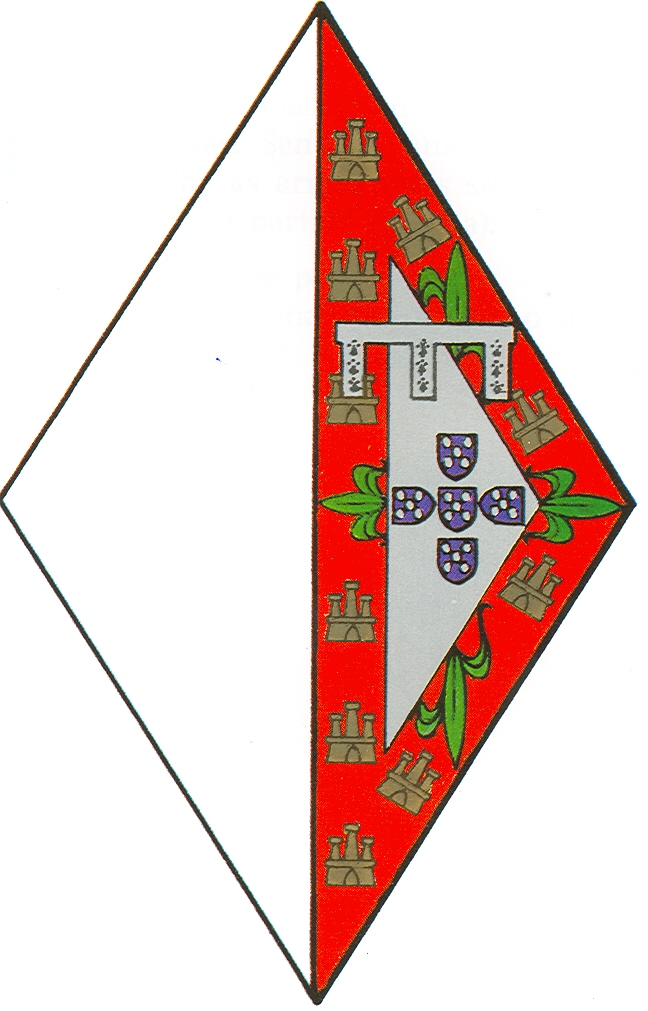
Coat of Arms (Lisonja) of Infanta Philippa of Coimbra.

Infanta Philippa of Coimbra (1437–1497) was the second youngest child of Infante Peter, Duke of Coimbra, and Isabella of Urgell, Duchess of Coimbra.

She joined the dominican convent of los Santos, where many daughters of the portuguese nobility were raised and educated, without taking the habits and being therefore allowed to get married. She moved later to the Convent of Odivelas, from where she took care of the goods and possessions of her father, during war times between 1466 and 1468. From her marriage with Joan Colom Bertran a son was born, Ferran Colom. Philippa of Coimbra died in 1497.

== Ancestry ==
Ancestors of Philippa of Coimbra

8. Peter I of Portugal
4. John I of Portugal
9. Teresa Lourenço
2. Peter, Duke of Coimbra
10. John of Gaunt, 1st Duke of Lancaster
5. Philippa of Lancaster
11. Blanche of Lancaster
1. Philippa of Coimbra
12. Peter II, Count of Urgell
6. James II, Count of Urgell
13. Margaret of Montferrat
3. Isabella of Urgell
14. Peter IV of Aragon
7. Isabella of Aragon
15. Sibila de Fortià
