= John Ramon III of Cardona =

Catalan nobleman

John Ramon III Folch de Cardona i de Prades (9 January 1418 – 18 July 1486) was a Catalan nobleman. John Ramon's titles included Count of Prades (5th), Count of Cardona, Viscount of Vilamur, Baron of Entença, Admiral of Aragon, Captain general of Catalonia as well as Viceroy of Sicily from 1477 to 1479.

== Biography ==
His parents were John Ramon II, 3rd Count of Cardona (14 June 1400 – 1471) and Joana de Prades, heiress of Prades and Entenza. John Ramon III became the fifth count of Prades and viscount of Vilamur upon the resignation of his father in 1445. Upon the death of his father in 1471, he inherited the County of Cardona.

John Ramon III was ambassador to the pope for Alfonso V of Aragon and actively participated in the Cortes from 1449 to 1455.

Shortly before beginning of the Catalan Civil War, John Ramon joined King John II of Aragon's army and was made Captain general. He became the leading military figure of the Civil War, earning the complete trust and protection of John II. In 1465 he was one of the protagonists of the victory at Calaf. For his service he was awarded the Sicilian town of Alì Terme in 1463. After the Catalan war, John Ramon accompanied Ferran, Prince of Girona to the campaign of Roussillon. He went on to fight against French troops in the Ampurdan area at battle of Besós.

As Viceroy of Sicily (1477–79), John Ramon moved to Italy accompanied by the infanta Joana, where he repressed the revolt of Leonard de Alagon y de Arborea in Sardinia.

In 1479, John Ramon returned to Catalonia and was the trusted advisor of the new king Ferdinand II of Aragon, whom he counseled for years. In 1484 the king entrusted him as Captain general of the campaigns against the count of Pallars and against the serfs of Pere Joan Sala.

John Ramon III died in 1486.

== Family ==
In 1445, John Ramon III married the dowager countess of Foix, Joana de Urgell i Arago, daughter of James II, Count of Urgell and his wife Isabel of Aragon. She was the widow of John I, Count of Foix. Their children were:

- James of Cardona
- Juan Ramón Folch IV de Cardona (1446-1513)
- Catalina de Cardona.

His second wife Elisabet de Cabrera, gave him no children, but brought him the revenues of the viscounties of Cabrera and Bas when his father-in-law, Bernat Joan de Cabrera died in 1466. However, John Ramon III had to renounce these properties, to please King John II of Aragon, who divided these spoils between de Sarriera and de Armendaris to pay for their 1471 defection. As compensation, the king of Aragon made count John Ramon III one of the three tenants of the Generalitat de Cataluna.

He also had two illegitimate children :

- Pedro Folc de Cardona (died 1530), viceroy of Catalonia (1521–23) and archbishop of Tarragona (1515–30),
- Juan of Cardona, knight of the order of St. John.
