= Adolph of Cleves, Lord of Ravenstein =

German nobleman

Adolph of Cleves
- Lord of Ravenstein
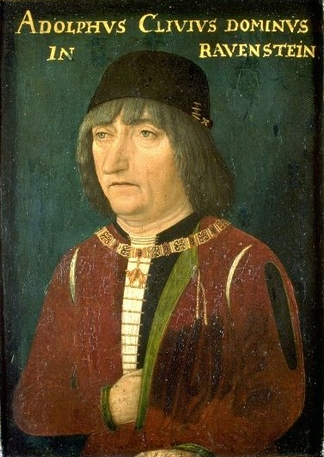
- Portrait of Adolph of Cleves, Lord of Ravenstein.
- Born: 1425
- Died: 1492 (aged 66–67)
- Noble family: La Marck
- Spouses: Beatrice of Coimbra; Anne of Burgundy
- Issue: Philip of Cleves, Lord of Ravenstein; Louise of Cleves
- Father: Adolph I, Duke of Cleves
- Mother: Marie of Burgundy

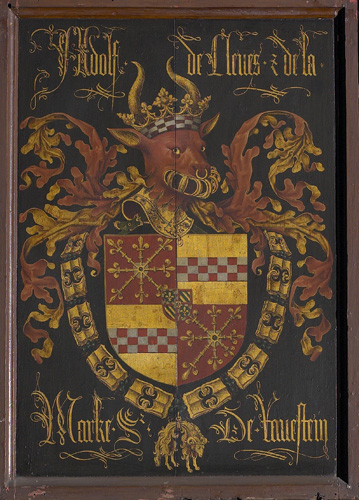
Arms of Adolph of Cleves, Lord of Ravenstein.

Adolph of Cleves, Lord of Ravenstein (1425–1492) was the youngest son of Adolph I, Duke of Cleves, and of his wife Marie of Burgundy, a sister of Philip the Good, Duke of Burgundy.

== Marriage and issue ==
Philip the Good of Burgundy and his wife, Isabel of Portugal, decided to arrange the marriage of their nephew Adolph, who became engaged to infanta Beatrice of Coimbra, daughter of Pedro, Duke of Coimbra.

Beatrice had taken refuge in Burgundy, under her aunt's protection, following the defeat of her father's army in the Battle of Alfarrobeira in Portugal in 1449.

Adolph and Beatrice were married on 13 May 1453 and they subsequently had two children:

- Philip of Cleves, Lord of Ravenstein; and
- Louise of Cleves (who died at a young age).

Following Beatrice's death, Adolph married his cousin Anne of Burgundy, a natural daughter of duke Philip the Good and governess of Mary of Burgundy, Duchess of Burgundy.

In 1463, Adolph inherited Wijnendale Castle, where in 1482 Mary of Burgundy would fall from her horse suffering fatal injuries. This accident would have major implications for the history of the Low Countries.

== Career ==
Adolph participated in all the battles that involved the Dukes of Burgundy. He was knighted after the Battle of Gavere, which ended the Revolt of Ghent (1449–1453). In 1454, he participated in the Feast of the Pheasant and became a knight of the Order of the Golden Fleece in 1456. In 1467, he played an important role in the Battle of Brustem during the Liège Wars.

In 1475, he was stadtholder-general of the Low Countries during the absence of Charles the Bold who was fighting the Burgundian Wars, a position confirmed by Mary of Burgundy after Charles' death in the Battle of Nancy in 1477.
