= Philip of Cleves, Lord of Ravenstein =

Philip of Cleves
- Lord of Ravenstein
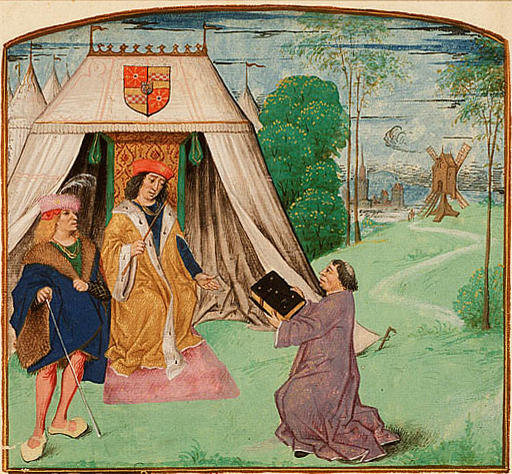
- Jean Molinet presents his book to Philip of Cleves.
- Born: 1459; Le Quesnoy
- Died: 28 January 1528 (aged 68–69); Wijnendale Castle, Wijnendale, Belgium
- Spouse: Francisca of Luxembourg (m. 1485; died 1523)
- House: La Marck
- Father: Adolph of Cleves, Lord of Ravenstein
- Mother: Infanta Beatrice of Coimbra

Philip of Cleves (1459 in Le Quesnoy – 28 January 1528 in Wijnendale Castle), Lord of Ravenstein, Wijnendale and Enghien, was a nobleman from the Low Countries and army commander, first for Maximilian of Austria, then for Flemish rebels and the kingdom of France.

== Biography ==
=== Background ===
He was the son of Adolph of Cleves, Lord of Ravenstein (1425–1492, grandson of the Duke of Burgundy John the Fearless) and Beatrice of Coimbra (died 1462, daughter of Infante Peter of Portugal). Philip grew up together with Mary of Burgundy because his father remarried Anne of Burgundy, aunt and governess of Mary of Burgundy. Philippe Monsieur, as he was called, married in 1485 Francisca of Luxembourg, daughter of Peter II, Count of Saint-Pol, Lord of Enghien. The marriage remained childless.

=== Career ===
In 1477, Philip of Cleves became military commander in French Flanders and fought against the French. In the Battle of Guinegate (1479), he was entrusted with leading the cavalry (Nassau led the infantry) to guard the crossing of the river Lys. Philip had an overly eager horse that pushed him ahead of his man in an uncontrolled manner. Maximilian himself witnessed Philip fought and fell right in front of his eyes and thought he was dead, but Philip and his horse in fact survived relatively undamaged. After this, Philip and a small band of Burgundian troops was chased by one hundred Frenchmen for 9 km until reaching Aire. According to Molinet, the French troops, seeing the young rider "dressed in a manteline of golden cloth, rich and elegant", riding a magnificent horse, thought that it was Maximilian himself. He did not return until the next day (later he explained that he had to persuade people who thought the battle was lost), when Maximilian was in a jubilated mood after the victory and did not give the slightest reproach, only delighted by the fact that his right-hand man (who was also his wife's relative) was still alive. Years later though, when the relationship between the two men worsened due to later events during the tumultuous regency of Maximilian, this event would trouble Philip again.

In 1482 he restored order in the Prince-Bishopric of Liège, after the murder of Bishop Louis de Bourbon, Bishop of Liège by William I de La Marck.

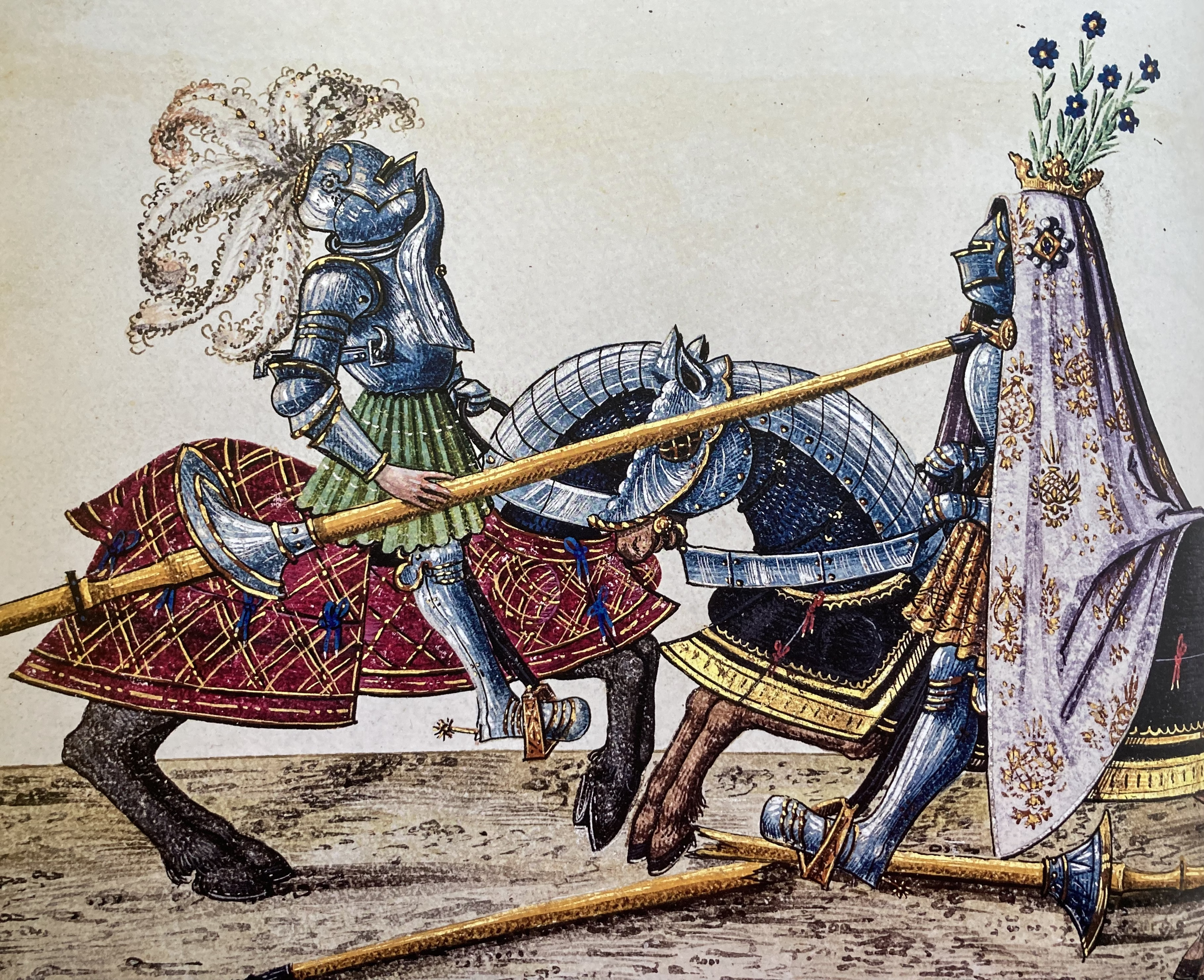
Philip of Cleves (on right) jousting with the Emperor Maximilian, from the Freydal tournament book

When Maximilian of Austria was called to Germany in 1486 to arrange the succession of his father Frederick III, Philip of Cleves took over the government of the Netherlands, together with Engelbert II of Nassau and chancellor Jean Carondelet. He was also Admiral of Flanders between 1485 and 1488.

After the return of Maximilian, Philip actively participated in the suppression of the revolt of the Flemish cities (Ypres, Bruges and Ghent). When Maximilian was taken prisoner in Bruges, Philip volunteered to take his place as hostage, so that Maximilian could be released on May 16, 1488, under the condition of granting more freedom to the cities. But, once released, Maximilian refused to honour the agreement. Deeply hurt by the betrayal of his Lord, Philip joined the rebellious cities and became their military commander. He tried to conclude an alliance with King Charles VIII of France, but received little military support. Haemers note that the Flemings had known in advance that a released Maximilian would not simply accepted the term, so the treaty stipulated that in the case the oath was broken, Philip, as the regent, would defend the countries against all invaders. Other attempts to ally with the Dutch Hooks, Brabant or Liège led to nothing. He was forced to surrender his last stronghold, Sluis, on 12 October 1492. In his allegory the Weisskunig, Maximilian would later claim that the "blue king" bought Philip away; Koenigsberger argues that the Cleves family had "hovered for years" in its loyalties and Philip's switching sides "cannot therefore have come as a complete surprise to his contemporaries".

After the revolt, Philip accompanied King Louis XII of France in his Italian invasion, and became Viceroy of Genoa. According to Hans Cools, his career as a governor was not successful. After a few years, he was allowed to return to the Netherlands and lived in the Castle of Enghien, until his wife died in 1523 and the castle was inherited by her sister Marie of Luxembourg, Countess of Vendôme. Philip lived the last five years of his life in the Wijnendale Castle.

Despite the efforts of his friend Charles I de Lalaing and his own efforts to explain his previous behaviours (including the Guinegate incident), Philip was never allowed into the Order of the Golden Fleece. Reportedly, Maximilian threatened to return his own collar if Philip was accepted.

== Legacy ==
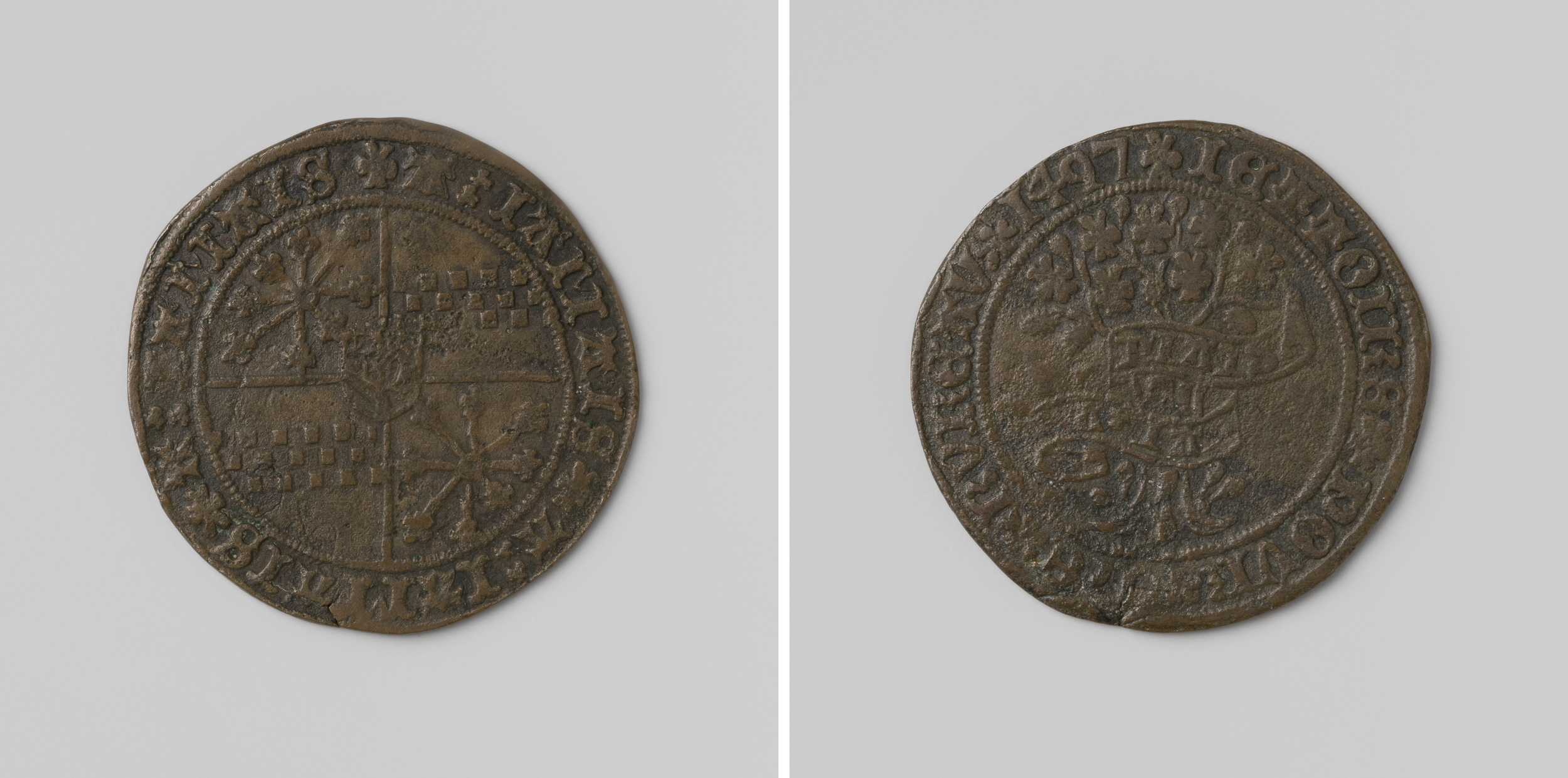
Copper medallion of Philip of Cleves, NG-VG-3-49. 1497. Rijksmuseum.

In the nineteenth century, Philip of Cleves became a Belgian national symbol. In the word of Henri Pirenne, he "the popular hero of the Flanders, the champion of the freedom of the Belgian municipalities in their supreme struggles against the foreigner." In the same vein, Henri Guillaume saw Philip as the courageous leader who unified the Belgian opposition against "the tyrannical pretensions of a foreign prince who exercised no legitimate power in Belgium." The "foreigner" or "foreign prince" implied here was Maximilian. A. de Fouw compares the role of Philip as leader of the Flemish revolt against Maximilian with that of William the Silent in the Dutch Revolt.

In 1941, Johanna Katharina Oudendijk argues against de Fouw's statement, claiming that the two men should not be equated. In 2004, Louis H.J.Sicking notes that in more recent research, Philip, as a forerunner of William, appears as a man who was motivated by class consciousness and his sense of honour, rather than by "national" interests. Jelle Haemers writes that Philip of Cleves was a man of his time and was not a champion of urban particularism nor hero of Flemish independence. In reality, he never demanded independence for Flanders and always recognized the French king as the country's sovereign. From 1499 to 1507, he devoted all his energy to the cause of the French crown in trying to crush the power of the Cisalpine cities. He respected the code of the feudal society and was the defender of the traditional hierarchical structure (associated closely with the privileges of the nobility), which he accused Maximilian and his supporters of trying to usurp. In Philip's and the aristocracy's mind, Maximilian and his "bad" advisors were trying to destroy the Burgundian state itself.

Philip of Cleves, Lord of Ravenstein House of La Marck
Belgian nobility
Preceded by Marghareta Brant; Lady of Grobbendoncq	Lord of Grobbendonk –	Succeeded by Amelberga of Cleves, Lady of Grobbendoncq
