= John, Hereditary Prince of Portugal (1451) =

John
- Hereditary Prince of Portugal
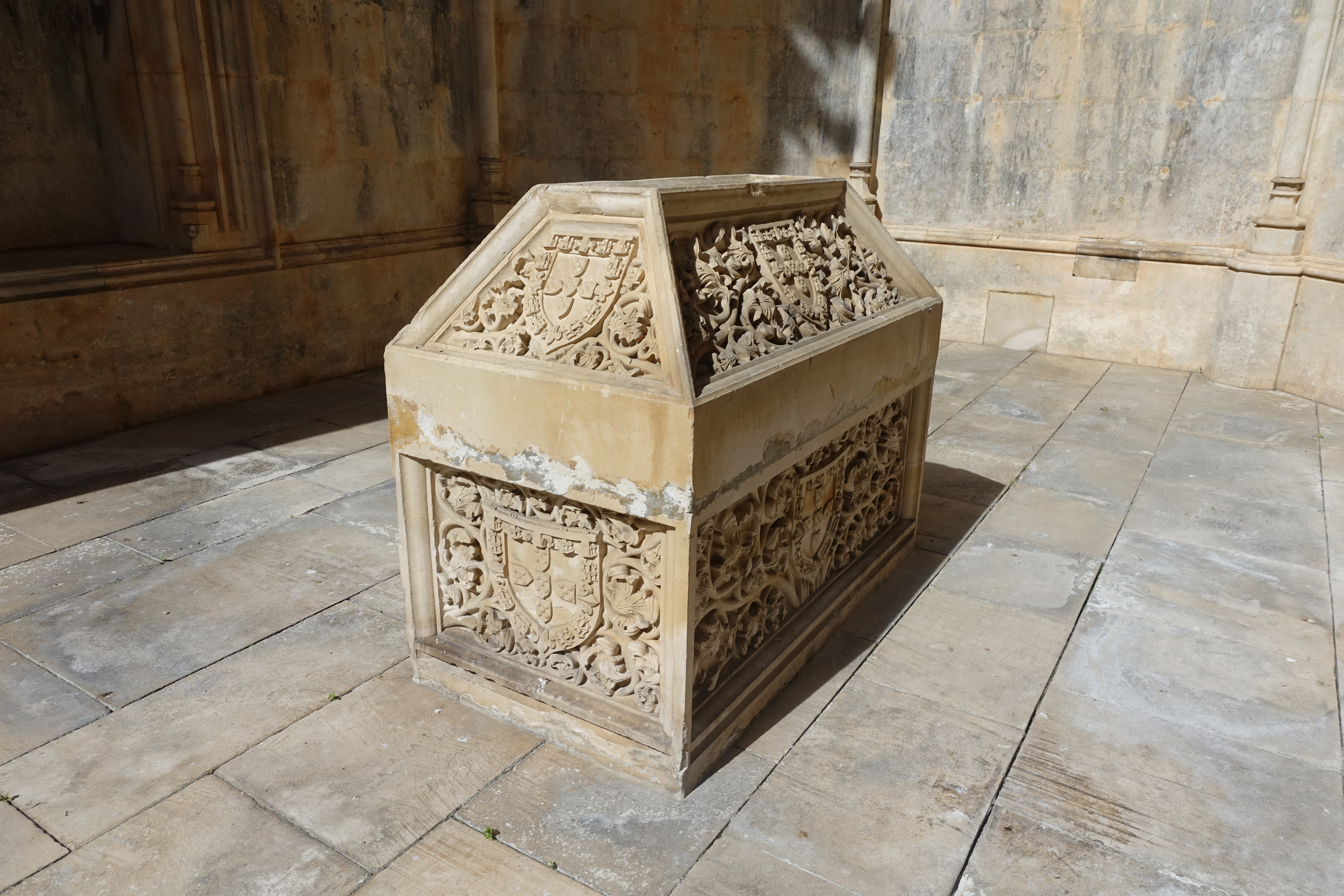
- Tomb in Mosteiro da Batalha
- Born: 29 January 1451; Sintra National Palace, Sintra, Kingdom of Portugal
- Died: February 1451 (aged 1 month)
- Burial: Monastery of Batalha, Batalha, District of Leiria, Portugal
- House: Aviz
- Father: Afonso V of Portugal
- Mother: Isabella of Coimbra

John, Prince of Portugal (Portuguese: João; 29 January – February 1451) was a Portuguese infante, son of Afonso V and Isabella of Coimbra. He was born heir to the throne in 1451, but he died young during the same year. The title of Prince of Portugal then passed again to Infante Ferdinand, Duke of Viseu, his uncle.

John, Hereditary Prince of Portugal (1451) House of Aviz Cadet branch of the House of Burgundy Born: 29 January 1451 Died: ? 1451
Preceded by Ferdinand	Hereditary Prince of Portugal; 1451–1451	Succeeded by Ferdinand
