= Elaine Sanceau =

British historian

- Born: 1896; Croydon, England
- Died: 23 December 1978; Porto, Portugal
- Occupations: Historian, writer
- Known for: Books on 16th-century Portugal

Elaine Sanceau MBE, OSE, ComIH (1896 – 1978) was a British historian of French origin who spent much of her life in Portugal and wrote extensively on Portuguese history, notably about the 16th century. In total, she wrote 38 books, together with many newspaper and magazine articles.

== Early life ==
Sanceau, who had French parents, was born in Croydon, England in 1896. She studied in Montreux, Switzerland before moving with her family to Brazil, where she lived until 1930 or 1931 before moving to Portugal.

== Historical research ==
While in Brazil, Sanceau was exposed to the colonial history of Portugal, and began to carry out research on the subject, particularly related to the 16th century when Portugal was expanding its empire into Asia. After leaving Brazil she settled in Portugal's second city of Porto, later moving to Leça do Balio, to the north of Porto. Continuing her research, her first major study was published in 1939 as Indies Adventure: the Amazing Career of Afonso De Albuquerque, Captain-general and Governor of India (1509-1515). This book has been recently described by a reviewer as achieving in prose what the noted Portuguese poet Luís de Camões achieved in poetry when writing Os Lusíadas, which celebrated the discovery of a sea route to India by the Portuguese explorer Vasco da Gama.

Sanceau produced 28 books on the 16th century. Among her other 12 works was one on the British Factory at Oporto, an organization of British port wine traders in Porto. Her books were first written in English and then translated into Portuguese, but her excellent knowledge of Portuguese made her monitor closely the translator's work. She was an assiduous researcher and spent many hours in the archives of the Torre do Tombo National Archive in Lisbon and in the Arquivo Histórico Ultramarino (Overseas historical archive), also in Lisbon, which preserves archives relating to the Portuguese empire. In October 1953, she was awarded a scholarship to visit the old Portuguese fortresses of Ceuta, Asilah and Tangier on the northwest coast of Africa.

Sanceau was elected as a member of the Institute of Coimbra, the International Academy of Portuguese Culture, and the Centro de Estudos Históricos Ultramarinos (Centre for Overseas Studies).

== Awards and recognition ==
In 1944 Sanceau was awarded the Camões Prize, considered to be the most important prize for literature in Portuguese, for Em Demanda do Preste João (The Land of Prester John). She was made an Officer of the Military Order of Saint James of the Sword in 1953 and a Commander of the Order of Prince Henry in 1961. She was awarded the Gold Medal of the city of Porto in 1968. In 1975 she was made an Officer of the Order of the British Empire. After her death a road in Porto was named after her.

== Death ==
Sanceau died on 23 December 1978. Her final work, Mulheres Portuguesas no Ultramar (Portuguese women in the Colonies), was published posthumously.

== Publications ==
Sanceau's publications in English include the following:

- Indies Adventure: the Amazing Career of Afonso De Albuquerque, Captain-general and Governor of India (1509-1515). 1939.
- The land of Prester John: A chronicle of Portuguese exploration. 1944.
- Henry The Navigator: The Story of a Great Prince & His Times. 1947.
- Knight of the Renaissance: A Biography of D. Joao de Castro - Soldier, Sailor, Scientist, and Viceroy of India, 1500-1548. 1949.
- The Perfect Prince: A Biography of The King Dom Joao II. 1959.
- Reign of the Fortunate King: Manuel I of Portugal. 1969.
- Captains of Brazil. 1971.
- The British Factory, Oporto. 1970.
- Portugal's contribution to global geography. 1973.
- Pioneers in Brazil. 1975.
