= Battle of Alfarrobeira =

1449 battle between Portuguese royal forces and those of the rebellious Duke of Coimbra

Coordinates: 38.87107°N 9.07793°W

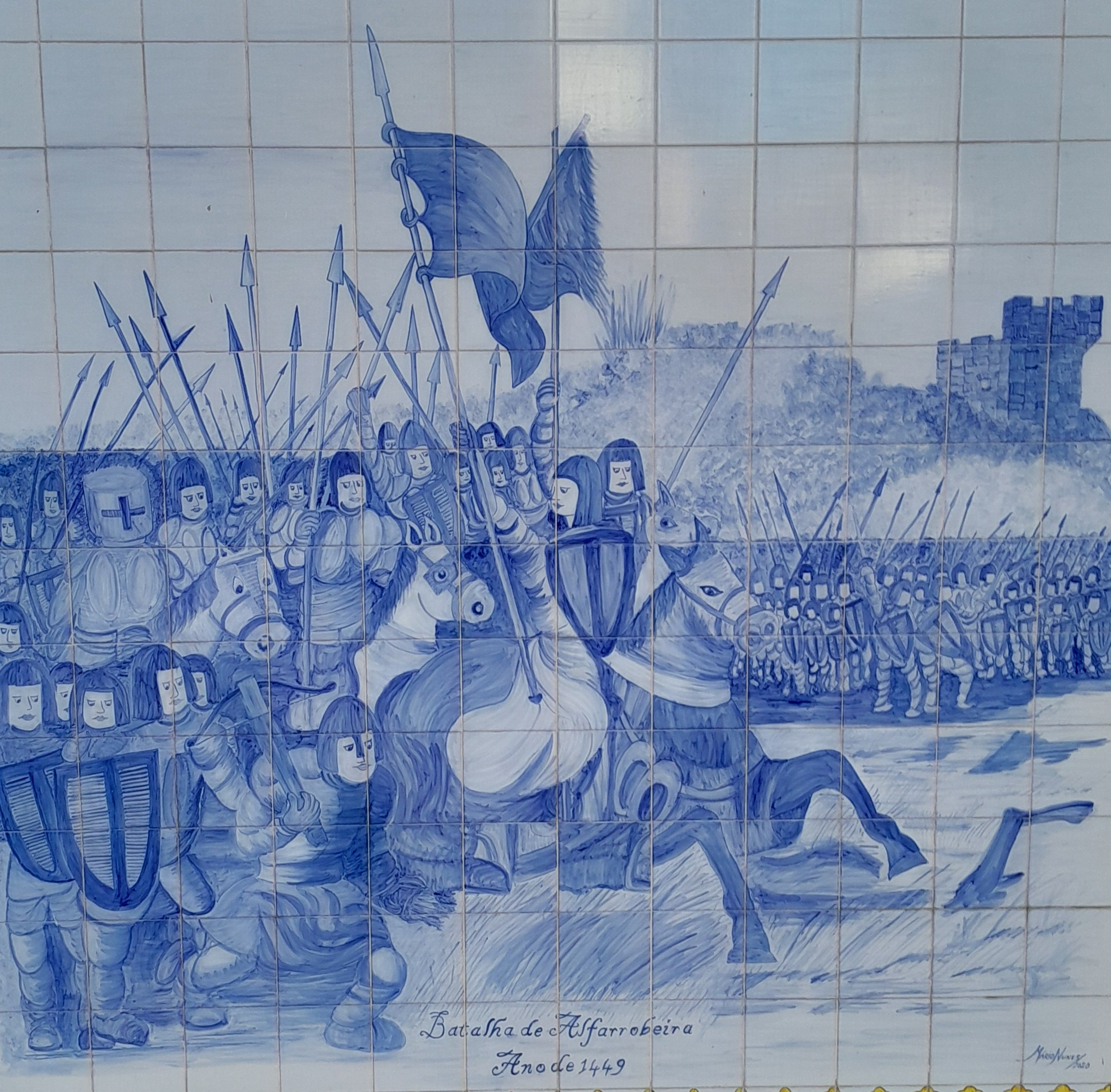
Date	20 May 1449
Location	Vialonga, near Lisbon, Portugal
Result	Rebellion suppressed; Supremacy of the main line of the House of Aviz preserved

Belligerents
Kingdom of Portugal House of Braganza	Coimbra Rebels

Commanders and leaders
Afonso V of Portugal; Duke of Braganza	Duke of Coimbra †

Strength
30,000 men	6,000 men: • 5,000 infantry • 1,000 cavalry

Casualties and losses
500 dead or wounded	4,000 dead, wounded, or captured

The Battle of Alfarrobeira (Portuguese pronunciation: [alfɐʁuˈβɐjɾɐ]) took place on 20 May 1449. It was a confrontation between the forces commanded by King Afonso V of Portugal and his uncle Afonso, Duke of Braganza, against the army of the rebellious Peter, Duke of Coimbra. The place was Vialonga, near Lisbon, at the margins of the creek of Alfarrobeira. The result was the clear defeat and death of the Duke of Coimbra and the establishment of the Braganzas as the most powerful House of Portugal.

== Background ==
After the death of King Fernando, the last of the First Dynasty, in 1383, power fell to the regent Queen Leonor, hated by the people, and her daughter Beatrice, married to the Castilian King Juan I. Fernando's half-brother John, Master of Aviz, led a revolution against the Queen and the Castilian King, defeating them with a smaller army in the battle of Aljubarrota. The battle became a turning point in Portuguese and world history, and King John I and his military aide, Constable Nuno Álvares Pereira, became immortal idols.

King John I had a first illegitimate son, Afonso, and a daughter Beatrice; after marrying Philippa of Lancaster, John of Gaunt's daughter, and establishing the House of Aviz, they had a first boy (died of young age), a girl Isabella (who became a famous duchess of Burgundy and Flanders), then five boys who were grew up under the memories of the famous battle. Edward (Duarte) was trained to become king, Peter (Pedro), Henry (Henrique, a.k.a. "The Navigator"), that was becoming powerful and famous with the military actions in Northern Africa against Muslims; John and Fernando, the youngest, died before Alfarrobeira. For ten years Peter lived abroad.

When King John I, and a few years later, King Edward, died, the crown fell on the boy Afonso V, under the regency of the Queen, an Aragonese; the people remembered 1383 and the civil war, and rebelled against the Queen. The old Afonso, Count of Barcelos, King John's first son, supported the Queen. Peter (now the eldest brother) led a revolution with the help of his brothers, but Henry managed to establish peace through a tripartite regency between the Queen, Peter, and Afonso.

In the years to follow, the Queen tried a coup-d'etat with the help of her family; Peter, married to an Aragonese whose family fought for Castilian power against the Queen's family, managed to send her back to Castile, appeased older Afonso giving him the Duchy of Braganza and secured the trust of his sons by promising them military titles, married his daughter to the young King, and assumed the Regency, establishing himself as the most powerful man in Portugal with the help of his brother Henry. But he made mistakes, for when his two brothers John and Fernando died, he gave their military titles to his sons, and not Afonso's sons as promised. Soon enough, the intrigues nurtured by the Duke of Braganza led the king to perceive his uncle the regent as an enemy.

When young Afonso V reached his 14th birthday, he dismissed his uncle as regent, associated with Afonso's sons, and began to uproot Peter's men from their positions of power. Finally, for reasons that would be proven false later, the King declared the Duke of Coimbra a traitor and usurper, called his banners to war and marched against Peter. The Duke of Braganza called his own banners in support of his nephew the king and joined forces with the royal army near Lisbon, bringing their numbers close to 30 000 men. The battle, near Lisbon, to the North, was short, and Peter one of its first victims being killed by an arrow. Henry, King John's fifth son, was now first and only surviving prince of the first generation of the House of Aviz.

== Outcome ==
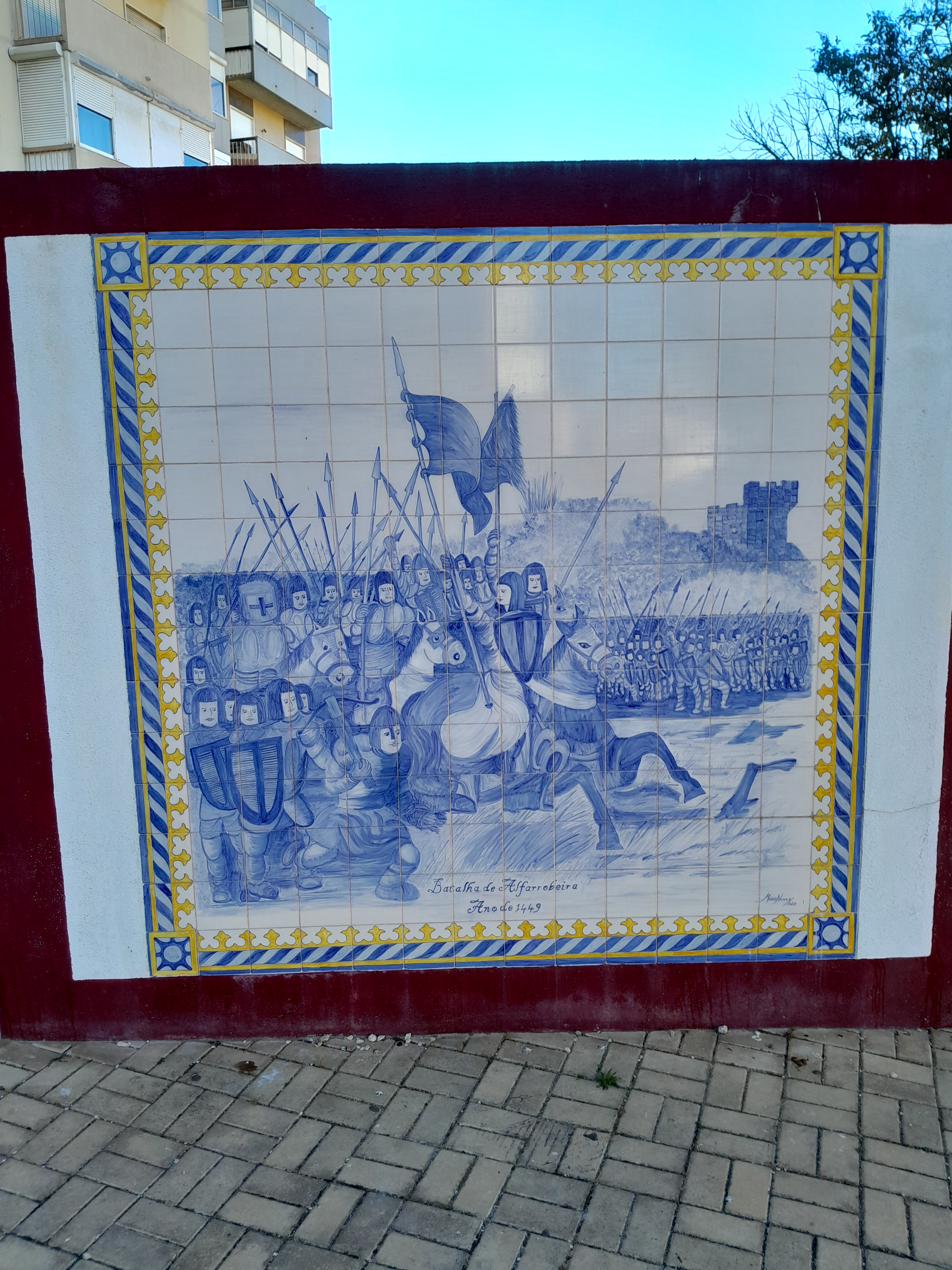
Monument in suburbs of Lisbon

Mistrusted by King Afonso V and the Duke of Braganza's sons as a member of the House of Aviz, and mistrusted by his dead brother's friends who never accepted his betrayal (and rejected by his old sister Isabella, in Burgundy), Henry retreated to his land in Sagres, the southernmost and westernmost tip of Portugal - and Europe. There, living a secluded and religious life, he concentrated his efforts on the sailing expeditions of his men, becoming worldly renowned as discoverer of never before seen oceans and coasts (Madeira, Azores, the African coast to Guinea, and after his death Cape of Good Hope, India, Japan, Canada, Brazil, etc.).

Afonso V ignored the travels of his uncle and immersed himself in the battles of Castile, trying to take the throne for himself, but his claim was defeated in the indecisive Battle of Toro by Queen Isabella the Catholic and King Fernando of Aragon. However, he won the naval war against the Catholic monarchs during this war of the Castilian Succession (1475–79). He died leaving Portugal on the brink of bankruptcy.

Afonso's son, John II, turned his back on Castile and saw an opportunity in the ocean discoveries and expanded them, making Portugal the first intercontinental empire and becoming the most powerful King in medieval history.
