= Isabella of Aragon, Countess of Urgell =

Isabella of Aragon
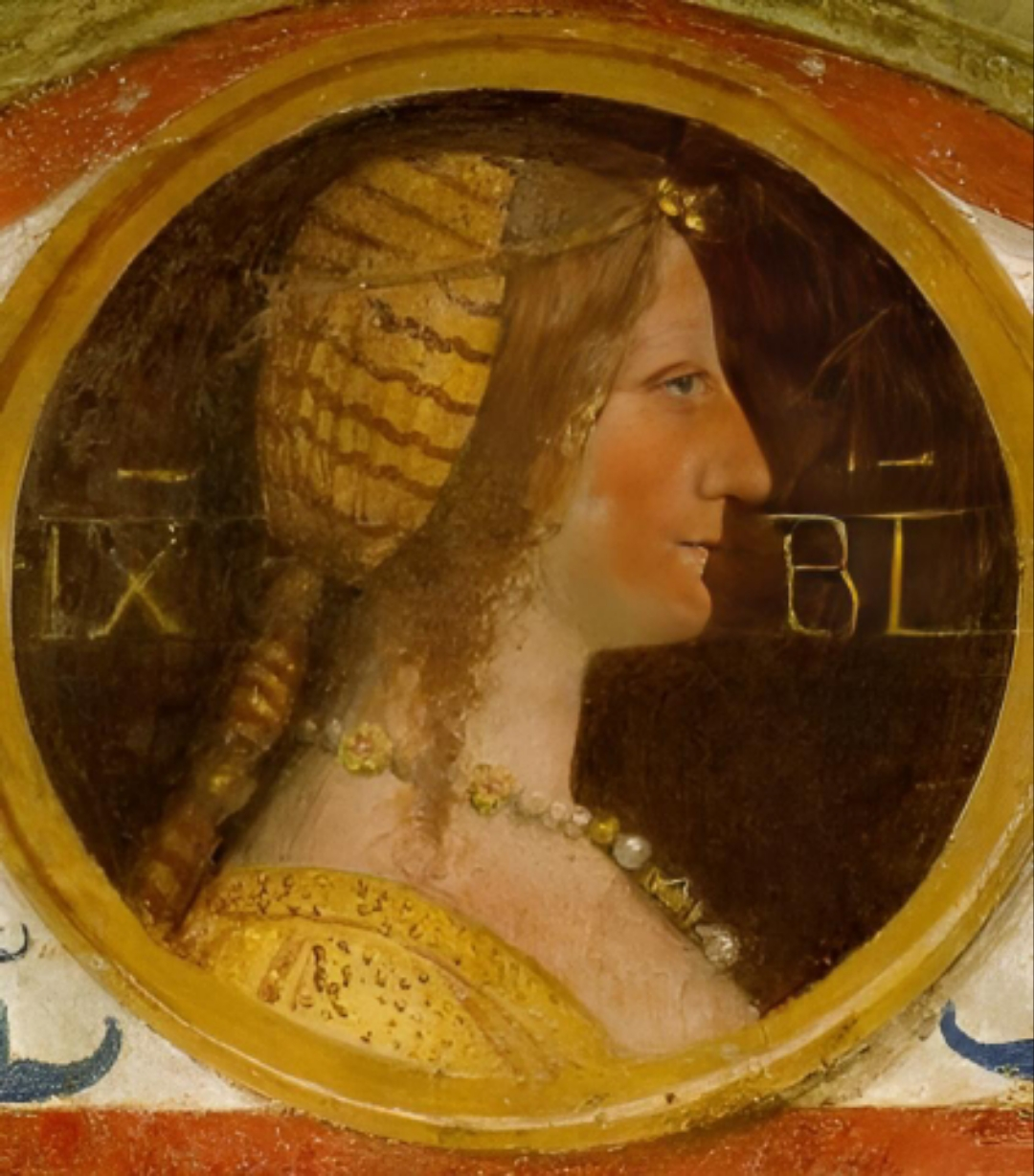

Countess consort of Urgell
- Tenure: 1407-1424
- Born: 1376; Barcelona
- Died: 1424 (aged 47–48)
- Spouse: James II, Count of Urgell
- Issue among others...: Isabella, Countess of Urgell; Eleanor, Countess of Nola; Joan, Countess of Foix
- House: Barcelona
- Father: Peter IV of Aragon
- Mother: Sibila de Fortià

Isabella of Aragon, Countess of Urgell (1376 – 1424) was a daughter of Peter IV of Aragon and his fourth wife, Sibila de Fortià. She was infanta of Aragon and Countess of Urgell.

== Family ==
Isabella of Aragon, Countess of Urgell, was the youngest of nine children, born to Peter; seven of them were half siblings to Isabella and her brother, Alfonso. Her half brothers included John I of Aragon and Martin of Aragon. Isabella's older half sisters include, Constance, Queen of Sicily, Joanna, Countess of Ampurias and Eleanor, Queen of Castile.

== Marriage ==
In Valencia on 29 June 1407, Isabella married James II of Urgell, soon after the marriage, James was appointed lieutenant of the Kingdom of Aragon in 1408.

The county of Urgell was dissolved in 1413, following her husband's revolt against the new King Ferdinand I of Aragon who had been chosen to succeed to the throne of Aragon in 1412 despite James having had the stronger claim as the closest legitimate agnate to the Royal House of Barcelona. Earlier, King Ferdinand had offered James 150,000 florins, the title of Duke of Montblanc, and proposed an alliance between his son Henry and their eldest daughter, Isabella, but James had refused Ferdinand's offer on the advice of his mother. In addition to the loss of his title and assets, James was later tried, condemned, and sentenced to life imprisonment.

The couple had five children:

1. Isabella of Urgell, Duchess of Coimbra (12 March 1409 – 17 September 1459). Married Infante Peter, Duke of Coimbra and was the mother of Isabella, Queen of Portugal.
2. Philip of Urgell (died 1422)
3. Eleanor of Urgell (1414 – after 1438). Married 1436 Raimondo Orsini, 6th Count of Nola.
4. Joan of Urgell (early 1415 Convent of Sijena – 1445). Married firstly John I, Count of Foix and secondly John Ramon III, Count of Cardona. Had issue from her second marriage.
5. Catherine of Urgell (died before 1424).

Isabella died in 1424, having outlived at least two of her children. Her husband was in prison, in Xàtiva, where he died in 1433. Their eldest surviving daughter, Isabella, became Countess of Urgell as well as Duchess consort of Coimbra.

== Sources ==
- Ryder, Alan (2007). The Wreck of Catalonia: Civil War in the Fifteenth Century. Oxford University Press.
