= Isabella of Portugal, Duchess of Burgundy =

Isabella of Portugal
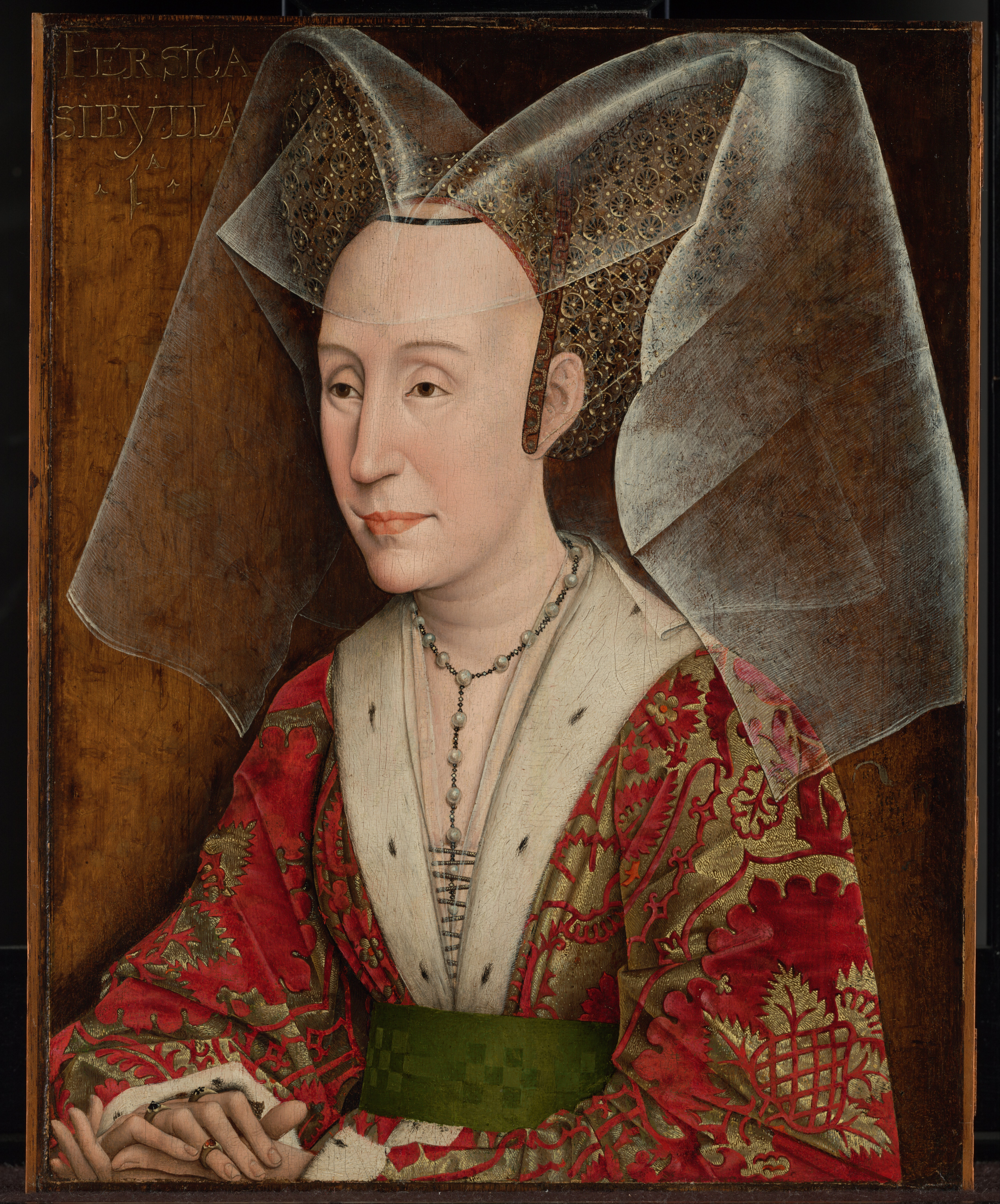
- Portrait of Isabella of Portugal, c. 1450

Duchess consort of Burgundy
- Tenure: 7 January 1430 – 15 July 1467
- Born: 21 February 1397; Évora, Portugal
- Died: 17 December 1471 (aged 74); Aire-sur-la-Lys, Burgundian Netherlands
- Spouse: Philip the Good (m. 1429; died 1467)
- Issue: Charles the Bold
- House: Aviz
- Father: John I of Portugal
- Mother: Philippa of Lancaster

Isabella of Portugal (Portuguese: Isabel de Portugal; 21 February 1397 – 17 December 1471) was Duchess of Burgundy from 1430 to 1467 as the third wife of Duke Philip the Good. Their son was Charles the Bold, the last Valois Duke of Burgundy.

Born a Portuguese infanta of the House of Aviz, Isabella was the only surviving daughter of King John I of Portugal and his wife Philippa of Lancaster. She served as the regent of the Burgundian Low Countries during the absence of her spouse in 1432 and in 1441–1443. Isabella served as her husband's representative in negotiations with England regarding trade relations in 1439 and those with the rebellious cities of Holland in 1444.

== Early life ==
Isabella was born to John I of Portugal and Philippa of Lancaster, who had six children survive infancy. Born in 1397 in Évora and raised in the Portuguese court in Lisbon, Isabella was the fourth child and only daughter to survive to adulthood. Philippa instilled in all her children, including her daughter, a sense of duty, faith and belief in education. Isabella was an avid reader, becoming proficient in Latin, French, English, and Italian. She was also interested in politics, joining her brothers in their lessons on affairs of state, and enjoyed riding and hunting with her brothers.

In 1415 Isabella received an offer of marriage from her cousin Henry V of England, an effort for England to form closer links with Portugal against France. The negotiations failed and Isabella remained unmarried. Also in 1415, she grieved at the death of her mother on 19 July, with whom she had a close relationship.

== Marriage negotiations ==
Aged 31, Isabella was still unmarried when the Burgundian house of Valois provided her with an offer of marriage in 1428. The reigning Duke of Burgundy, Philip the Good, had already been widowed twice - by Michelle of Valois and Bonne of Artois. Neither marriage left surviving issue. For his third wife, Philip was anxious to seek a candidate from a nation allied to England to secure his alliance with it further. Isabella was attractive to Philip as a potential consort, being well-bred, shrewd and accomplished.

On 19 October 1428, Philip sent a delegation from Sluys led by his chief counsellor, the Seigneur de Roubaix, that arrived in Lisbon on 16 December after calling at Sandwich until 2 December and acquiring two more ships. The delegation waited another month while Isabella's father and brothers met at Aviz to discuss the matter. On 19 January 1429, a formal request for the Infanta's hand was made by the Burgundians, and discussions between the two parties began. The Portuguese agreed to the marriage and sent messengers on 2 February to receive the Duke of Burgundy's formal response, signed on 5 May and received by the Portuguese on 4 June. The marriage contract was drawn up, and Isabella, still in Portugal, was married to Philip the Good by proxy on 24 July 1429, with Roubaix acting as groom.

== Duchess of Burgundy ==
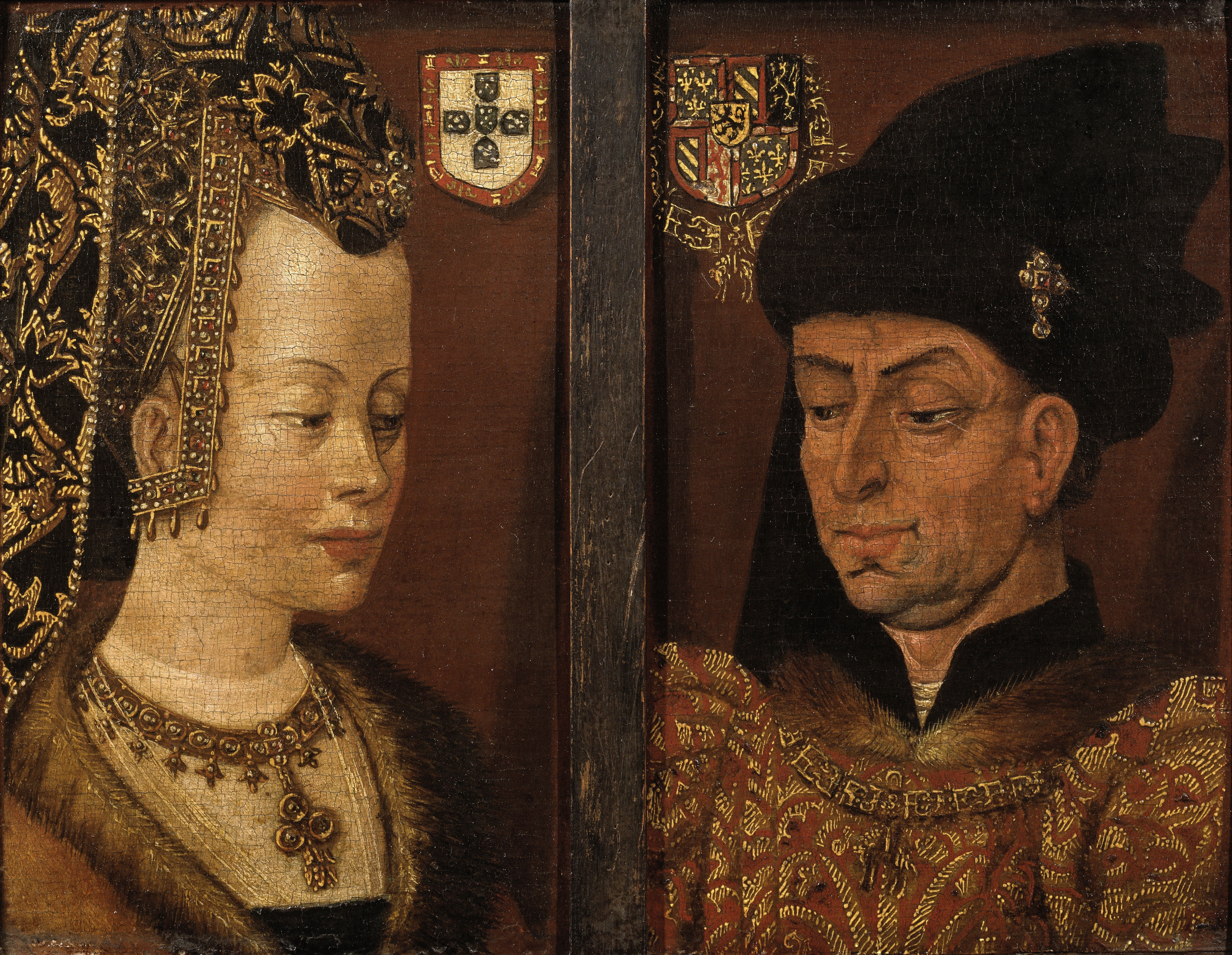
Isabella of Portugal and Philip the Good

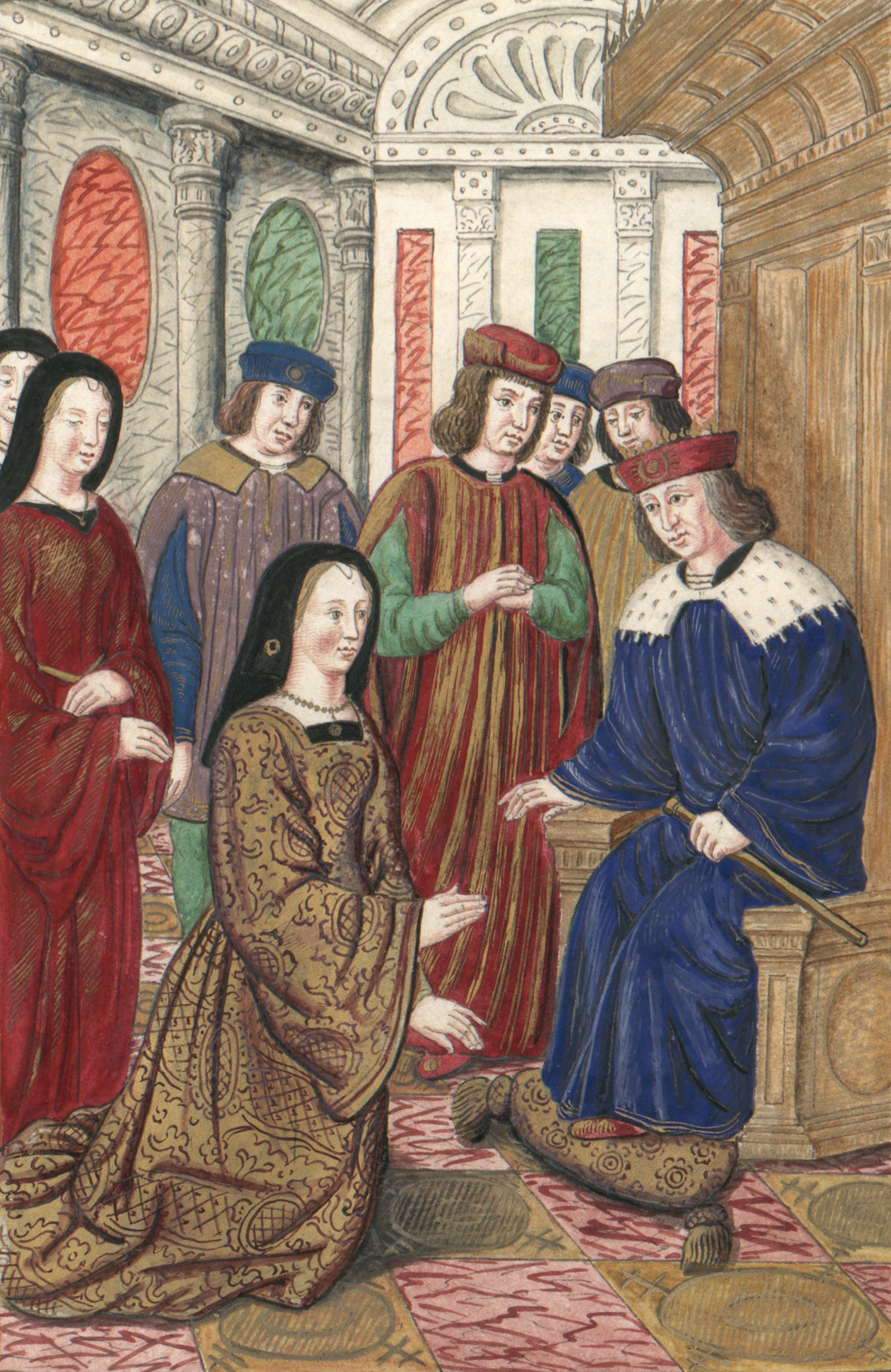
Isabella of Portugal and Charles VII of France.

Isabella did not leave Portugal for another eight weeks. Her father had a fleet and trousseau prepared and on 19 October 1429, with a flotilla of about 20 ships, Isabella—accompanied by almost 2000 Portuguese—left Portugal forever. After an eleven-week journey when the fleet was beset by storms, causing the loss of several ships and much of her bridal trousseau, the convoy reached Sluys on 25 December 1429. The Duchess disembarked the following day where she and Philip celebrated their formal religious marriage two weeks later, on 7 January 1430. She arrived in Bruges on 8 January 1430.

Following a week of celebrations in Bruges, the newlyweds then travelled through the main territories of Burgundy: from Ghent (16 January) to Kortrijk (13 February) to Lille, and then to Brussels, Arras, Péronne-en-Mélantois, Mechelen and, by mid-March Noyon, where Isabella, now pregnant, chose to rest through the spring, only leaving when Joan of Arc led a campaign against the nearby Compiègne. She then returned to Ghent, where she dealt with a potential guild uprising.

Isabella was at first unprepared for the lavish style of court life in Burgundy, one of the most extravagant in Europe. The Portuguese infanta, described by the Burgundian embassy that had negotiated her marriage as appearing to their eyes as a nun when they had first met, and now dressed in loose clothing and flat over-panels to hide her pregnancy, looked particularly dowdy at her new court. More upsetting to Isabella, however, was her husband's behaviour. He had showered gifts on her when she had first arrived, and still more when she had become pregnant; yet, he made it clear that he had no intention of keeping his vows of fidelity and chastity. He kept numerous women as his lovers, most living away from the court, and fathered a large number of illegitimate children.

Isabella gave birth to her first child on 30 December 1430 at Coudenberg in Brussels, a year after her marriage. The child, Antoine, sickly at birth, was christened on 16 January 1431, and soon after both parents left to attend to ducal business. By the autumn of that year, Isabella was once again pregnant with their second son, Joseph; more importantly, she had spent a long continuous period of time with her husband, and demonstrated her intelligence and abilities, as well as her commitment to Burgundian independence. Because of this, when Charles VII of France began attacking Burgundy in January 1432, Philip—leaving Coudenburg to defend Dijon—ordered that she represent him during his absence. Antoine and Joseph both died in 1432, but the duchess then gave birth to the future Charles the Bold on 21 November 1433. Thus, the couple had issue:

- Anthony (Antoine) of Burgundy (30 December 1430, Brussels – 5 February 1432, Brussels), Count of Charolais, died in infancy;
- Joseph (Josse) of Burgundy (24 April 1432 – in 1432, after 6 May), Count of Charolais, lived only a few weeks;
- Charles of Burgundy (21 November 1433 – 5 January 1477), Philip's successor, known as "Charles the Bold".

Isabella was a refined and intelligent woman who liked to be surrounded by artists and poets. She was a generous patron of the arts. In politics, she had a great influence on her son, but even more so on her husband, whom she represented on several diplomatic conferences and for whom she governed when he was absent. Most notably, she negotiated many of the marriages of the members of her court, among them the marriage of her son Charles to Catherine of France. She also took special pains on behalf of Mary of Guelders, who attended upon Catherine. Isabella helped arrange her marriage to James II of Scotland, which would make her queen.

== Later life ==
By 1457, however, she had withdrawn from the court and distanced herself from her husband, partly to side with her son in his estrangement with him, partly out of a desire to live a more devout and quieter life. Her personal feelings came into conflict with the decisions of her husband, resulting in her abandoning court and taking up refuge in the castle of La Motte-au Bois, where she established a parallel court, which became a protectorate for the victims of her husband's official politics. At that time she assisted the Flemish harmed by Philip's military actions and, under her protection, advanced Josse van Huerter to her nephew, Ferdinand of Portugal.

Following the death of Henry VI of England, who had no surviving heirs, Isabella asserted her right to the English throne in a charter dated 17 June 1471, declaring herself to be Henry's universal heiress on account of the consanguinity conferred by her grandfather (and Henry's great-grandfather), John of Gaunt. She would later relinquish the claim to her son, Charles, one month before her death.

Isabella died in Aire-sur-la-Lys in December 1471. She was interred in the Champmol on 11 February 1474.

Isabella of Portugal, Duchess of Burgundy House of Aviz Cadet branch of the House of Burgundy Born: 21 February 1397 Died: 17 December 1471
Royal titles
Preceded by Bonne of Artois	Duchess consort of Burgundy; 1430–1467	Succeeded by Margaret of York
