= Peter II of Urgell =

Count of Urgell (1340–1408)

Peter II
- Coat of arms of Urgell

Count of Urgell
- Reign: 1347 - 1408
- Predecessor: James I, Count of Urgell
- Successor: James II, Count of Urgell
- Born: 1340
- Died: June 1408 (aged 67–68); Balaguer
- Spouse: Beatrice of Cardona; Margaret Paleologa
- Issue: James II, Count of Urgell
- House: Barcelona
- Father: James I, Count of Urgell
- Mother: Cecilia of Comminges

Peter II (Spanish: Pedro, IPA: [ˈpeðɾo]; 1340 – June 1408) was Count of Urgell from 1347 until his death.

== Biography ==
He was the eldest son of count James I of Urgell and Cecilia of Comminges, daughter of the count of Comminges and viscount of Turenne, Bernard VII. At the death of his father, he inherited his titles of Urgell, viscount of Àger, baron of Entença and Antillón; as he was underage, his mother acted initially as tutor and regent.

In 1363 he married Beatrice of Cardona, daughter of Ugo Folch de Cardona. In 1376 he remarried to Margaret Paleologa, daughter of John II, Marquess of Montferrat.

In 1396, after Martin of Aragon had become king of Aragon, he faced Matthew, Count of Foix, who had invaded Aragon, and pushed him back. He died at Balaguer in 1408.

His son with Margaret Paleologa was James II, Count of Urgell.

== Sources ==
- Alamán, Lucas; Manuel Orozco y Berra. Diccionario universal de historia y de geografía. p. 152.
- E. Michael Gerli, Samuel G. Armistead, ed. (2003). Medieval Iberia: an encyclopedia. Routledge.

| Preceded by James I | Count of Urgell; 1347-1408 | Succeeded by James II |
