= Family tree of Portuguese monarchs =

See also: Portugal - History of Portugal - List of Portuguese monarchs

== First Dynasty: The Burgundians ==
Portuguese House of Burgundy
Robert I 1011–1076; Duke of Burgundy
Constance; 1046–1093	Alfonso VI; 1040–1109; King of León and Castile	Jimena; Muñoz d. 1128	Henry of Burgundy c. 1035– 1070/1074
Hugh I 1057–1093; Duke of Burgundy	Robert; 1059–1111; Bishop of Langres	Odo I 1060–1102; Duke of Burgundy
Urraca; 1079–1126; Queen of León and Castile	Theresa; 1080–1130	Henry; 1066–1112; Count of Portugal	Hugh II; 1084–c. 1143; Duke of Burgundy
Amadeus III; 1095–1148; Count of Savoy	Odo II; 1118–1162; Duke of Burgundy
Alfonso VII the Emperor; 1105–1157; King of León	Urraca c. 1095–_{after}1169	Sancha c. 1097–1163	Afonso I 1109–1185; King of Portugal r. 1139–1185	Matilda of Savoy; 1125–1158	Pedro d.1165	Ramon Berenguer IV; 1114–1162; Count of Barcelona	Petronilla of Aragon; 1136–1173	Hugh III; 1142–1192; Duke of Burgundy
Ferdinand II; King of León and Galicia c. 1137–1188	Urraca; 1151–1211	Mafalda; 1153–aft.1162	Sancho I 1154–1211; King of Portugal r. 1185–1211	Dulce of Aragon; 1160–1198	Philip I 1143–1191; Count of Flanders	Theresa c. 1157–1218	Odo III; 1166–1218; Duke of Burgundy
Alfonso IX; 1171–1230; King of León and Galicia	Theresa; 1178–1250	Sancha c. 1182–1229; Lady of Alenquer	Afonso II; 1185–1223; King of Portugal r. 1211–1223	Urraca of Castile; 1186/1187–1220	Peter I 1187–1258; Count of Urgell	Aurembiax; 1196–1231	Ferdinand; 1188–1233; Count of Flanders	Joan; 1194–1244
Ferdinand III; 1201–1252; King of Castile	Urraca; Alfonso de León ≈1197–1258	Blanche c. 1192–1240; Lady of Guadalajara	Henry I 1204–1217; King of Castile and Toledo	Mafalda c. 1195–1256	Berengaria; 1190s–1221	Valdemar II; 1170–1241; King of Denmark
Alfonso X the Wise; 1221–1284; King of Castile	Beatrice of Castile; 1242–1303	Afonso III; 1210–1279; King of Portugal r. 1248–1279	Matilda II; 1202–1260; Countess of Boulogne	Mécia; Lopes de Haro c. 1215–1270	Sancho II; 1209–1248; King of Portugal r. 1223–1247	Fernando; 1217–1246; Lord of Serpa	Sancha; Fernández de Lara	Eleanor c. 1211–1231	Valdemar the Young; King of Denmark c. 1209–1231
Sancho IV; 1258–1295; King of Castile	Denis; 1261–1325; King of Portugal r. 1279–1325	Isabel of Aragon; 1271–1336	Blanche; 1259–1321; Lady of Las Huelgas	Afonso; 1263–1312; Lord of Portalegre	Violante Manuel of Castile c. 1265–1314	Sancha; 1264–c. 1302	Maria; 1264–1304
Ferdinand IV; 1285–1312; King of Castile	Constance; 1290–1313	Beatrice of Castile; 1293–1359	Afonso IV; 1291–1357; King of Portugal r. 1325–1357
Maria; 1313–1357	Alfonso XI; 1311–1350; King of Castile	Constanza Manuel of Villena; 1315/1323–1345	Inês de Castro; 1325–1355	Peter I 1320–1367; King of Portugal r. 1357–1367	Teresa Lourenço b. 1330	Eleanor; 1328–1348	Peter IV; 1319–1387; King of Aragon
Leonor Telles de Meneses de Meneses; 1350–1386	Ferdinand I 1345–1383; King of Portugal r. 1367–1383	Maria; 1342–_{after}1363	Fernando b. 1329; Marquis of Tortosa	Henry II; 1334–1379; King of Castile
Beatrice; 1373–c. 1420; Queen of Portugal (disputed) r. 1383–1385	John I 1358–1390; King of Castile	Isabel; 1364–1395	Alfonso Enríquez; 1355–1395; Count of Gijón and Noroña	Sancho; 1342–1374; Count of Alburquerque	Beatrice c. 1347–1381	Constanza; Enríquez de Castilla	John; 1349–1397; Duke of Valencia de Campos	Denis; 1354–1397; Lord of Cifuentes	Joan of Castile b. c. 1360
John I 1358–1433; King of Portugal r. 1385–1433
House of Braganza
Constance of Noronha; 1395–1480	Afonso I 1377–1461; 1st Duke of Braganza	Beatriz Pereira de Alvim de Alvim; 1380–1415	Second dynasty House of Aviz

== Second Dynasty: Houses of Aviz ==
Peter I 1320–1367; King of Portugal r. 1357–1367	Teresa Lourenço b. 1330
Ferdinand I 1345–1383; King of Portugal r. 1367–1383	Philippa of Lancaster; 1360–1415	John I 1357–1433; King of Portugal r. 1385–1433	Inês Peres c. 1350 – c. 1400
Ferdinand I 1380–1416; King of Aragon	Beatrice c. 1386–1439; Countess of Arundel	Afonso; 1377–1461; 1st Duke of Braganza
Eleanor of Aragon; 1402–1445	Edward; 1391–1438; King of Portugal r. 1433–1438	Isabella; 1397–1471; Duchess of Burgundy	Henry; 1394–1460; Duke of Viseu	Peter; 1392–1449; Duke of Coimbra	Isabella of Urgell; 1409–1459	Ferdinand; 1402–1443; The Holy Prince	John; 1400–1442; Constable of Portugal	Isabel of Barcelos; 1402–1466	Fernando I 1403–1478; 2nd Duke of Braganza
John II; 1398–1479; King of Aragon	Maria of Aragon; 1396–1445	John II; 1405–1454; King of Castile	Isabella; 1428–1496
Eleanor; 1434–1467	Frederick III; 1415–1493; Holy Roman Emperor	Catherine; 1436–1463	Henry IV; 1425–1474; King of Castile	Joan; 1439–1475	Ferdinand; 1433–1470; Duke of Viseu	Beatrice; 1430–1506
Maximilian I 1459–1519; Holy Roman Emperor	Mary of Burgundy; 1457–1482	Ferdinand II of Aragon; 1452–1516; King of Castile	Isabella I 1451–1504; Queen of Castile	Isabella of Coimbra; 1432–1455	Afonso V 1432–1481; King of Portugal r. 1438–1477, r. 1477–1481	Joanna la Beltraneja; 1462–1530
Joanna; 1452–1490	John II; 1455–1495; King of Portugal r. 1477, r. 1481–1495	Eleanor of Viseu; 1458–1525	Isabella of Viseu; 1459–1521	Fernando II; 1430–1483; 3rd Duke of Braganza
Philip I 1478–1506; King of Castile	Joanna; 1479–1555; Queen of Castile	Catherine of Aragon; 1485–1536	Henry VIII; 1491–1547; King of England	Afonso; 1475–1491; Prince of Portugal	Isabella of Aragon; 1470–1498	Manuel I 1469–1521; King of Portugal r. 1495–1521	Maria of Aragon; 1482–1517	Jaime; 1479–1532; 4th Duke of Braganza
Ferdinand I 1503–1564; Holy Roman Emperor	Catherine; 1507–1578	John III; 1502–1557; King of Portugal r. 1521–1557	Charles V(I); 1500–1558; King of Spain	Isabella; 1503–1539	Beatrice; 1504–1538; Countess of Asti	Charles III; 1486–1553; Duke of Savoy	Henry; 1512–1580; King of Portugal r. 1578–1580	Edward; 1515–1540; Duke of Guimarães	Isabella of Braganza; 1514–1576
Afonso; 1509–1540; Cardinal-Infante	Louis; Duke of Beja; 1506 —1555	Ferdinand; 1507–1534; Duke of Guarda	Guiomar; Coutinho of Marialva d. 1534
Third Dynasty; House of Habsburg
João; Manuel; 1537–1554	Joanna of Austria; 1535–1573	Maria Manuela; 1527–1545	Philip I(II); 1527–1598; King of Portugal r. 1581–1598	Teodósio I 1510–1563; 5th Duke of Braganza
Sebastian; 1554–1578; King of Portugal r. 1557–1578	António; 1531–1595; Prior of Crato; King of Portugal r. 1580–1582	Catarina; 1540–1614	João I 1543–1583; 6th Duke of Braganza
Ana de Velasco y Girón; 1585–1607	Teodósio II; 1568–1630; 7th Duke of Braganza
Fourth Dynasty; House of Braganza
John IV; 1604–1656; King of Portugal r. 1640–1656

== Third Dynasty: Houses of Habsburg ==
Manuel I 1469–1521; King of Portugal r. 1495–1521	Philip I 1478–1506; King of Castile
Eleanor of Austria; 1498–1558	Catherine; 1507–1578	John III; 1502–1557; King of Portugal r. 1521–1557	Isabella; 1503–1539	Charles V(I); 1500–1558; King of Spain	Ferdinand I 1503–1564; Holy Roman Emperor
João Manuel; 1537–1554; Prince of Portugal	Joanna of Austria; 1535–1573	Mary I 1516–1558; Queen of England	Maria of Austria; 1528–1603	Maximilian II; 1527–1576; Holy Roman Emperor	Charles II; 1540–1590; Archduke of Austria	Maria Anna of Bavaria; 1551–1608
Maria Manuela; 1527–1545	Elisabeth of Valois; 1545–1568	Philip I (II); 1527–1598; King of Portugal r. 1581–1598	Anna of Austria; 1549–1580
Henry IV; 1553–1610; King of France	Carlos; 1545–1568; Prince of Asturias	Catalina Micaela; 1567–1597	Charles; Emmanuel I 1562–1630; Duke of Savoy	Isabella; Clara; Eugenia; 1566–1633	Albert VII; 1559–1621; Archduke of Austria	Philip II (III); 1578–1621; King of Portugal r. 1598–1621	Margaret of Austria; 1584–1611	Ferdinand II; 1578–1637; Holy Roman Emperor
Louis XIII; 1601–1643; King of France	Anne of Austria; 1601–1666	Charles of Austria; 1607–1632	Ferdinand of Austria; 1609/1610–1641	Maria Anna of Spain; 1606–1646	Ferdinand III; 1608–1657; Holy Roman Emperor
Elisabeth of France; 1602–1644	Philip III (IV); 1605–1665; King of Portugal r. 1621–1640	Mariana of Austria; 1634–1696	Philip; 1615–1690; Elector Palatine
Louis XIV; 1638–1715; King of France	Maria Theresa of Spain; 1638–1683	Philippe I 1640–1701; Duke of Orléans	Balthasar Charles; 1629–1646; Prince of Asturias	John of Austria; 1629–1679
Marie Louise of Orléans; 1662–1689	Charles II; 1661–1700; King of Spain	Maria Anna of Neuburg; 1667–1740	Margaret Theresa of Spain; 1651–1673	Leopold I 1640–1705; Holy Roman Emperor	Eleonore of Neuburg; 1655–1720
