= Diogo, Constable of Portugal =

Diogo
- master of the Order of Santiago

constable of Portugal
- Born: 1425
- Died: 1443 (aged 17–18)
- House: Aviz
- Father: John, Constable of Portugal
- Mother: Isabel of Barcelos
- Religion: Roman Catholicism

Diogo of Portugal (1425–1443) was a Portuguese royal prince, who briefly served as Constable of Portugal and Master of the Order of Santiago.

Diogo was the eldest son of John, Lord of Reguengos de Monsaraz, Infante of Portugal, and of his wife (and niece) Isabella of Barcelos. Through his father, Diogo was the grandson of King John I of Portugal and through his mother, the grandson of Afonso of Barcelos (future first duke of Braganza).

John of Reguengos had been the master of the Order of Santiago since 1418 and Constable of Portugal since 1431. Upon John's premature death in October 1442, the Portuguese regent, Peter of Coimbra decided to appoint John's son Diogo as the new Constable of Portugal. Diogo was elected on 24 January 1443, as the 11th Master of the Order of Santiago. Diogo died a few days later, without issue. Peter appointed his own son, also named Peter, to succeed him as constable.

These appointments were contested by Diogo's half-uncle (and grandfather), Afonso, Count of Barcelos. Afonso had married the daughter of the late beatified constable Nuno Álvares Pereira, and believed their son, Afonso of Ourem, had superior rights to succeed as Constable of Portugal. Peter of Coimbra challenged Barcelos and Ourem to provide documentary proof of the legitimacy of this lineage (which they were unable to produce). Peter of Coimbra attempted to mollify them by creating the title of Duke of Braganza, and investing it in Afonso of Barcelos. However, this failed to heal the breach between Peter and Afonso, which would only grow with time.

== Ancestry ==
Ancestors of Diogo, Constable of Portugal

16. Afonso IV of Portugal
8. Peter I of Portugal
17. Beatrice of Castile
4. John I of Portugal
18. Lourenço Martins
9. Teresa Lourenço
19. Sancha Martins
2. John, Constable of Portugal
20. Edward III of England
10. John of Gaunt, 1st Duke of Lancaster
21. Philippa of Hainault
5. Philippa of Lancaster
22. Henry of Grosmont, 1st Duke of Lancaster
11. Blanche of Lancaster
23. Isabel of Beaumont
1. Diogo, Constable of Portugal
24. Peter I of Portugal (= 8)
12. John I of Portugal (= 4)
25. Teresa Lourenço (= 9)
6. Afonso I, Duke of Braganza
26. Pero Esteves, o Barbadão
13. Inês Pires
27. Maria Anes
3. Isabel of Barcelos
28. Álvaro Gonçalves Pereira
14. Nuno Álvares Pereira
29. Iria Gonçalves do Carvalhal
7. Beatriz Pereira de Alvim
30. João Pires de Alvim
15. Leonor de Alvim
31. Branca Pires Coelho

== Bibliography ==
"Nobreza de Portugal e do Brasil" – Vol. I, page 297. Published by Zairol Lda., Lisbon 1989.
