= Isabella of Portugal, Queen of Castile =

Queen of Castile and León from 1447 to 1454

Isabella of Portugal
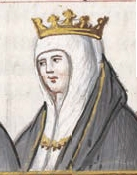

Queen consort of Castile and León
- Tenure: 17 August 1447 – 22 July 1454
- Born: 1428; Portugal
- Died: 15 August 1496 (aged 67–68); Arévalo, Castile
- Burial: 24 February 1505; Miraflores Charterhouse, Burgos, Spain
- Spouse: John II of Castile (m. 1447; died 1454)
- Issue: Isabella I of Castile; Alfonso, Prince of Asturias
- House: Aviz
- Father: John, Constable of Portugal
- Mother: Isabel of Barcelos

Isabella of Portugal (Isabel in Portuguese and Spanish) (1428 – 15 August 1496) was Queen of Castile and León between 1447 and 1454 as the second wife of King John II.

A granddaughter of John I of Portugal and Philippa of Lancaster, Isabella married John at age 19. They had two children that survived infancy: Isabella, who became Isabella I of Castile, and Alfonso, who died young.

== Early life and background ==
Isabella was born c. 1428 in the Kingdom of Portugal. Her father was Infante John, 3rd Constable of Portugal, a younger son of King John I of Portugal and Philippa of Lancaster. Her mother, Isabella of Barcelos, belonged to the House of Braganza as the daughter of Afonso, 1st Duke of Braganza and his first wife, Beatriz Pereira de Alvim. John and Isabella were uncle and niece.

Isabella was brought up at the Portuguese royal court, but little is known of her early life before her arrival in Castile.

== Marriage ==
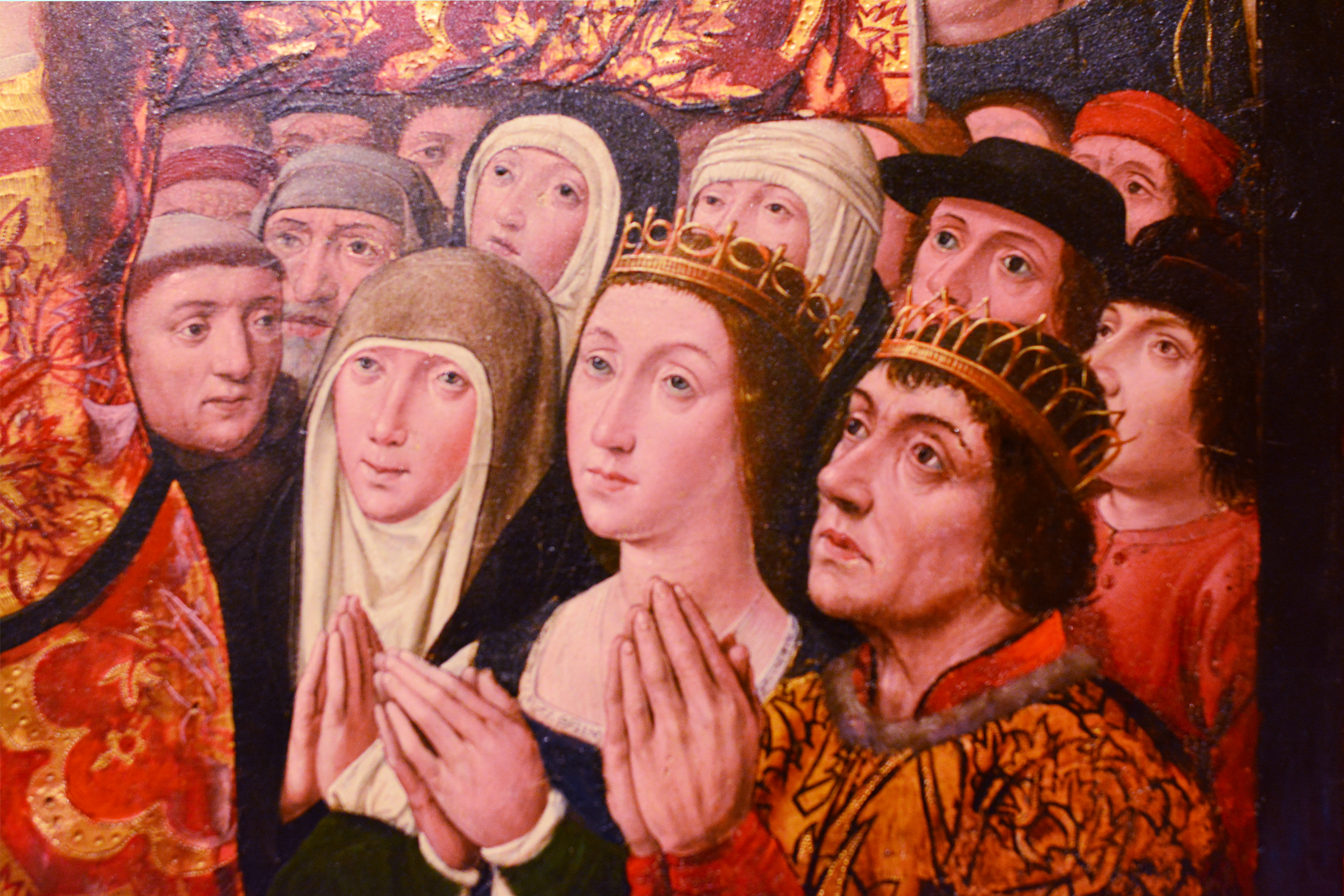
Isabella of Portugal and her husband John II of Spain by Juan de Nalda. (Monasterio de Santa Clara, Palencia) This painting is thought to have been commissioned by their daughter Isabella.

Following the death of Maria of Aragon on 18 February 1445, John II of Castile was left a widower with only one child, the future Henry IV of Castile. Henry had been joined to Blanche II of Navarre in an unconsummated marriage for seven years and was called "El Impotente." Because of this, John decided to seek another wife, and originally intended to marry Princess Radegonde, daughter of Charles VII of France. (Note: Betrothed at the age of two to Sigismund of Austria, Radegonde died on 19 March 1445 after falling ill during a pilgrimage.) However, John's trusted adviser and friend, Álvaro de Luna, sought to develop a political alliance with Portugal and regarded Isabella of Portugal as an ideal candidate to strengthen it. (Note: Through this alliance, Álvaro de Luna sought to strengthen his own position against the ambitions of the Aragonese faction led by John II of Navarre during the Castilian Civil War of 1437–1445. It has been suggested that in 1445 he ordered the poisoning of Queen María of Aragon and her sister Eleanor of Aragon, widow of Edward I of Portugal, who died under suspicious circumstances one day apart, thereby severing the Aragonese dynastic ties with both Castile and Portugal. Luna is also thought to have completed this strategy by later arranging the marriage of Henry IV of Castile to Joanna of Portugal, although some historians have suggested that Isabella of Portugal herself, Joanna's cousin, may also have played a role.) Apparently without John II's knowledge, de Luna and Peter of Coimbra began arranging the marriage between the king and Isabella.

Within only a few months of María of Aragon's death, the marriage negotiations had already been concluded. The couple were first cousins once removed through the king's mother Catherine of Lancaster, who was half-sister of Philippa of Lancaster, Isabella's paternal grandmother. Because the prospective spouses were related within the third degree of consanguinity, Pope Eugenius IV issued an apostolic brief dispensing them from the impediment of kinship. The brief was dated at Rome on 5 November 1445.

The first successful negotiations took place at Ávila on 2 April 1446, when agreements concerning Isabella's dowry were signed. On 9 October, the formal betrothal was concluded at Évora. In addition to defining the terms of the marriage, the agreement addressed the considerable age difference between the couple—John was forty-one and Isabella eighteen—and specified the arrangements that would apply should she become a widow. She would be free to return to Portugal and remarry without forfeiting either the lifetime revenues assigned to her or the three million maravedís granted to her by the Crown of Castile upon her marriage. She was also guaranteed complete authority over the administration of her own household.

The betrothal was celebrated in Portugal in May 1447 with elaborate festivities in Lisbon, Coimbra, and Pinhel. From there she was escorted by a Castilian retinue to Madrigal de las Altas Torres.

On 22 July 1447 Isabella married John II at the royal palace of Madrigal de las Altas Torres. The ceremony was officiated by Pedro of Castile, the king's uncle and Bishop of Palencia. (Note: Although some sources give 14 August as the wedding date, the surviving notarial record of the marriage confirms that the ceremony took place on 22 July 1447 at the royal palace of Madrigal. The ceremony was attended by "a great multitude of ecclesiastics, knights, squires, noblemen, ladies, maidens, and many other people, both clergy and laity, so numerous that one of the great halls of the royal palace was filled with people." Among those present were the Constable Álvaro de Luna; Íñigo López de Mendoza, Marquis of Santillana; Alonso Pimentel, Count of Benavente; Gutierre de Sotomayor, Master of the Order of Alcántara; Diego Pérez Sarmiento, Count of Santa Marta and adelantado mayor of Galicia; Friar Gonzalo de Quiroga, Prior of the Order of Saint John; Ruy Díaz de Mendoza, the king's major-domo; García Sánchez de Valladolid, knight and royal guard; Vasco Perdigão, Bishop of Évora; and Luís Coutinho, Bishop of Coimbra.) One of the witnesses to the marriage was Íñigo López de Mendoza, Marquis of Santillana, who later dedicated to the queen a poem beginning, "May God make you virtuous, blessed Queen, as much as He has made you beautiful," in which he also mentions the painter Giotto.

== Life as queen ==
King Afonso V of Portugal provided Isabella with a dowry consisting of the 45,000 florins owed to Portugal by Castile, together with an additional 60,000 florins representing her inheritance, which was to be paid upon her mother's death. In return, John II granted her three million maravedís, an annual income of 1,350,000 maravedís, and the lordships of Soria, Arévalo, and Madrigal. Although Ciudad Real was also included among her grants, she appears never to have taken possession of it. She formally took possession of Madrigal on 2 August and of Soria on 14 August.

Isabella arrived in Castile from Portugal in the same month as her marriage, accompanied by a large retinue of ladies-in-waiting, including Beatrice of Silva, who became renowned at the Castilian court for her beauty and later founded the Order of the Immaculate Conception and was canonized by the Catholic Church. Also among her attendants was Catalina Franca de Castro, daughter of the knight Juan de Franca y Alarzón, who served as her menina, lady-in-waiting, and chief lady of the household. Catalina became the queen's closest confidante following her arrival in Castile. Together with her husband, Gutierre Velázquez de Cuéllar (1430–1492), she managed the queen's household until the king's death.

During her early years as queen consort, court life revolved around hunting, banquets, and dances. Contemporary sources portray her as a politically capable figure. Her library included a copy of the Memorial de Virtudes by Alonso de Cartagena, a treatise dedicated to her by its author that emphasized the ruler's responsibility to make just decisions for the benefit of his subjects.

Coat of arms of Isabella of Portugal as Queen of Castile

Following the birth of her daughter in 1451, Isabella's her mental health began to deteriorate, and contemporaries considered her to be suffering from mental illness. Her condition reportedly worsened after the birth of her second child and deteriorated further following her husband's death. Modern medical interpretations have identified her symptoms as consistent with postpartum depression. Her mental illness has also been attributed to hereditary factors within the Portuguese royal house. (Note: This interpretation has been supported by the mental illnesses attributed to several of her descendants. Her granddaughter Joanna of Castile became known as "Joanna the Mad", while similar conditions have also been suggested for her great-grandson Charles V, Holy Roman Emperor. According to this view, Charles did not consider this hereditary predisposition when he married Isabella of Portugal, allowing it to be passed on to Philip II of Spain and his son Carlos, Prince of Asturias.)

Contemporary chronicles describe her marriage as a close and affectionate one. According to Cañas Gálvez, John II found in her the beauty and affection that he had not experienced in his marriage to Maria of Aragon. Chroniclers also recorded public displays of affection between the royal couple, crediting her with rejuvenating the king's spirits. When she began to show signs of emotional instability, the king attempted to lift her spirits with gifts, including "a gold chain fashioned in the form of tree trunks, with fifty-eight links enamelled in white, grey, and rose, weighing six marks and one ounce", as well as an annual income of 6,000 maravedís.

=== Conflict with de Luna ===
Isabella played a significant role in the downfall of Constable Álvaro de Luna. Luna was deeply unpopular at court and especially loathed by Isabella because of the influence he exercised over John II.

In 1453, de Luna had John's chief auditor thrown out of a window. John was convinced by Isabella to have de Luna arrested and executed. John supposedly regretted the execution, and his health declined in the months after.

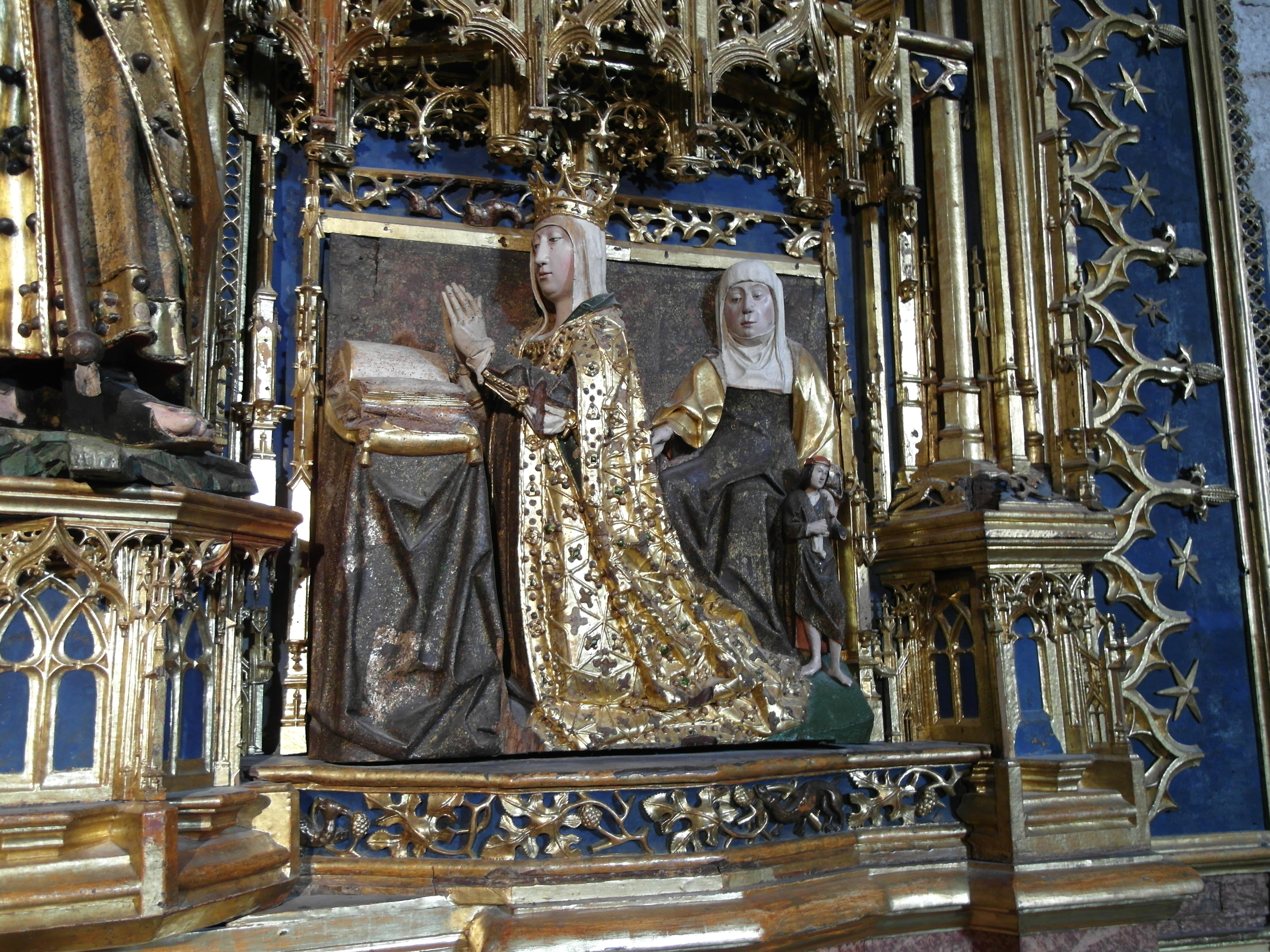
A praying Isabella in effigy

== Queen dowager ==
John II of Castile died in Valladolid on 22 July 1454. In his will, he appointed Isabella as guardian and administrator of the persons and estates of their children, Isabella and Alfonso, (Note: John II's will states: "I order that the said Queen, my wife, shall be guardian and administrator of the said Infantes Don Alfonso and Doña Isabel, my children and hers, and of their estates until the said Infante reaches the age of fourteen years and the said Infanta twelve years, and that she shall govern and administer them with the advice and counsel of the Bishop of Cuenca, Friar Gonzalo, my confessors, and my council... And I wish and command that my said children be brought up in whatever place or places my most dear and beloved wife the Queen shall ordain.") provided that she remained in his kingdoms and did not remarry, effectively obliging her to remain in Castile. Although her marriage capitulations had allowed her to return to Portugal and remarry, they made no provision regarding any future children, and she never returned to live in Portugal. Shortly before his death, influenced by Juan Pacheco, Marquis of Villena, and possibly in an effort to prevent another civil war, John II confirmed as his heir his son by his first marriage, who succeeded him as Henry IV of Castile. Henry's marriage to Blanche II of Navarre had been annulled the previous year, and in 1455 he married his cousin Joan of Portugal, who was also a cousin of the dowager queen Isabella.

The chronicles report that Isabella's mental health deteriorated further after John II's death, from which she never recovered. In January 1455 she established her residence at Arévalo, where she lived with her mother and her two children. Although John II had appointed García Martínez de Bahamonde, Bishop of Lugo, to oversee her household in his will, responsibility for her household and person appears to have been entrusted in 1456 to Gutierre Velázquez de Cuéllar and his wife, Catalina Franca de Castro, who served as her lord and lady chamberlain. Velázquez became her most trusted servant and remained in her service until his death in 1492. His wife continued to attend the queen until her own death, and several of their children also entered royal service. Their son Juan Velázquez de Cuéllar succeeded his father as head of the dowager queen's household and later became an influential figure during the reign of Isabella I of Castile. (Note: Juan Velázquez de Cuéllar served in numerous senior offices under the Catholic Monarchs, Philip I of Castile, and Ferdinand II of Aragon, and was also one of Queen Isabella I's executors.) Another lady in her household was María de Guevara, daughter of Ladrón de Guevara y Quesada, lord of Escalante and Treceño, and wife of Arnao de Velasco, brother of Juan de Velasco, 1st Count of Siruela.

Although she has traditionally been portrayed as living in seclusion at Arévalo with little public activity, surviving documentation shows that she actively administered her estates and, whenever permitted, oversaw the upbringing of her children, with assistance from her mother. In 1455 she defended her daughter Isabella's rights to the lordship of Cuéllar, which John II had bequeathed to her as part of her dowry, (Note: John II granted the Lordship of Cuéllar to the Infanta Isabella until Henry IV paid her 200,000 gold doblas. Instead, Henry later granted the lordship to his favourite Beltrán de la Cueva in 1464 and compensated his half-sister with the more valuable lordship of Trujillo, after Isabella and her mother warned that they would appeal to the Santa Hermandad if he failed to honour their father's will.) Two years later she travelled to Maqueda to defend the interests of her son Alfonso's estates, and in 1460 she did the same with her own lordship of Soria. According to the chronicles, her relations with the new king were initially cordial: "he treated her with reverence, appointing a captain with two hundred mounted soldiers to serve as her guard and providing whatever pleased her." Henry IV visited her on nine occasions, (Note: He visited her in September 1454; January, March, April, and November 1455; November 1457; October 1458; June–September 1459; and April 1460.) but relations appear to have deteriorated in 1461 when he ordered that her children, Isabella and Alfonso, be removed to court, away from their mother and her circle of influence. (Note: The exact year that Isabella's children permanently left Arévalo for Henry IV's court is disputed, with historians placing it between 1457 and 1461.)

With regard to politics during the reign of Henry IV, Isabella appears to have exercised a measure of influence, acting on the advice of her mother. Although there is no direct evidence, both women may have played a role in the Farce of Ávila, during which the twelve-year-old Alfonso of Castile was proclaimed king. Likewise, her participation in the secret negotiations with John II of Aragon over the marriage of her daughter Isabella I of Castile to the Aragonese heir Ferdinand II of Aragon cannot be confirmed. However, given her demonstrated political judgment, Cañas Gálvez considers it highly likely that she played an important part in the negotiations.

The events of the following years further undermined her mental health. Her mother died in 1465, and in 1468 she suffered the death of her fifteen-year-old son Alfonso. The following year Henry IV deprived her of the lordship of Arévalo, granting it instead to Álvaro de Zúñiga y Guzmán, Count of Plasencia. Deeply offended by this decision, she left the town and settled at Madrigal de las Altas Torres. After Henry's death in 1474, her daughter Isabella became queen of Castile but kept her mother away from court and confined to her palaces at Madrigal until restoring Arévalo to her in 1480. During the final years of her life she continued to experience episodes of mental illness, although surviving records indicate that she remained capable of managing her household and estates under the supervision of the Catholic Monarchs, who visited her frequently. Queen Isabella personally attended to her mother during these visits. As late as 1494 she was still dealing with disputes arising from the Zúñigas' brief possession of Arévalo, and in the year before her death, probably while already in poor health, she petitioned the monarchs on behalf of one of her ladies, María Velázquez, daughter of Gutierre Velázquez and Catalina Franca de Castro, concerning her dowry.

== Death and burial ==
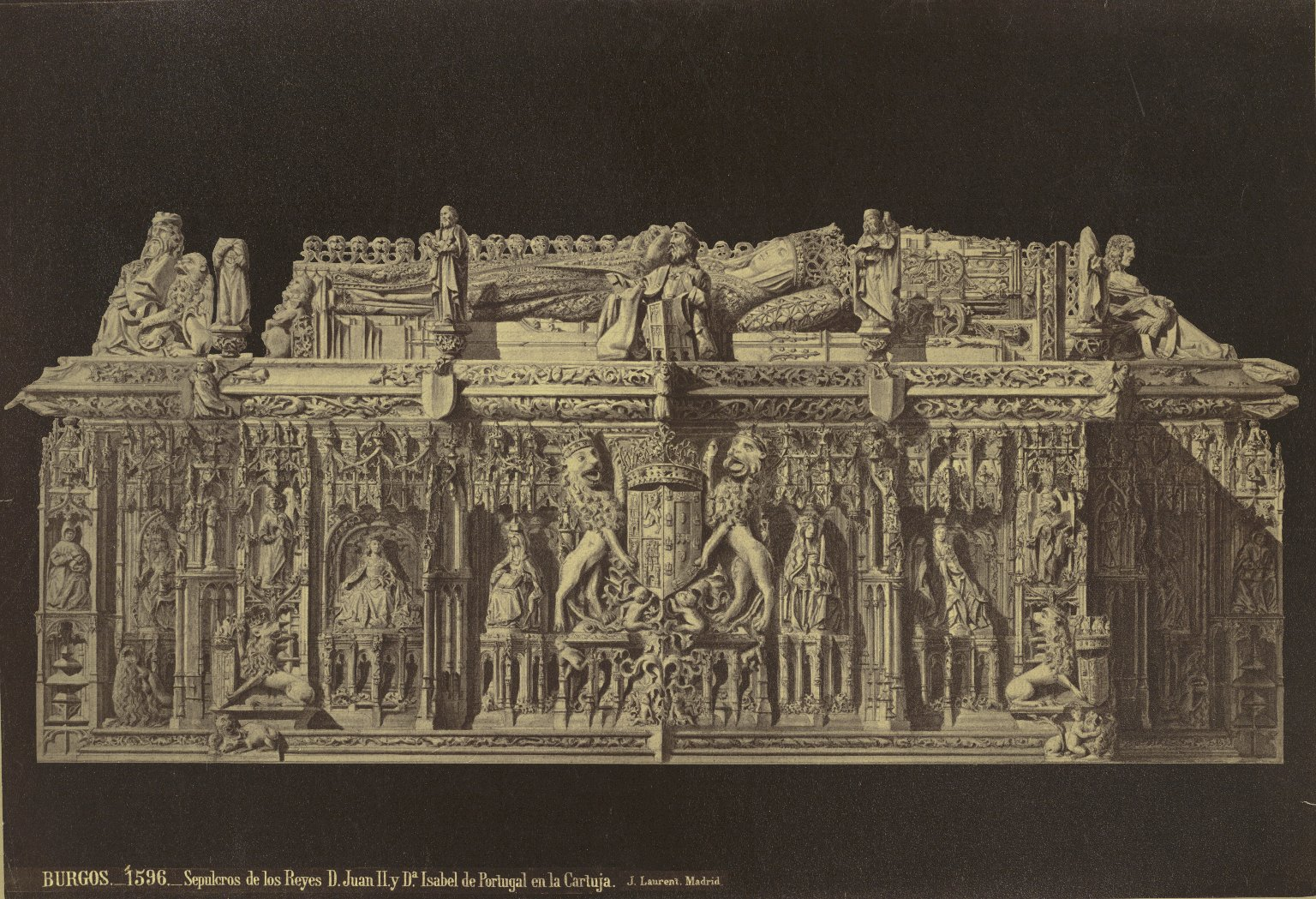
Tomb of Isabella of Portugal

After falling ill a month earlier and being treated by a team of physicians that included Juan de la Parra, Queen Isabella died at the royal residence in Arévalo on 15 August 1496. Her funeral rites were conducted with considerable splendour, and she was buried at the Monastery of San Francisco in Arévalo, as previously arranged by the accountant Juan Velázquez de Cuéllar. The monastery also served as a burial place for several members of her family: her mother, Isabella of Barcelos, was buried there, as was her son, the Infante Alfonso, Prince of Asturias, until his remains were transferred elsewhere in 1492.

Isabella's remains stayed at San Francisco until February 1505, when they were transferred to the Miraflores Charterhouse, in accordance with her will of 14 July 1496, in which she requested burial beside her husband. She was reinterred there on 24 February 1505, by which time her daughter Isabella had also died.

The elaborate star-shaped tomb containing the remains of John II and Queen Isabella was commissioned by their daughter Isabella from Gil de Siloé and was completed by 1493. The monument is a Gothic alabaster structure containing recumbent effigies of the two monarchs. Isabella is depicted wearing a crown and veil, resting on two cushions and dressed in richly embroidered garments. She wears numerous rings and holds a book and an ornate rosary in her hands. At her feet are a dog, a child, and a lion, representing the feminine ideals of fidelity, tenderness, and strength.

During the restoration of the charterhouse in 2006, an anthropological examination was carried out on the remains of John II, Queen Isabella, and the Infante Alfonso by researchers from the University of León. Only four bone fragments from Isabella's skeleton survived, but they were sufficient to establish her maternal relationship to Alfonso. Most of her skeleton was probably lost during the French sack of the charterhouse in the Peninsular War in 1808, or during a further pillaging in 1821. Because so few remains survive, it was not possible to determine the cause of her death, although it may have resulted from a brief illness associated with old age.

In addition to the tomb, Isabella's daughter commissioned the church's high altarpiece from Gil de Siloé and Diego de la Cruz, who produced it between 1496 and 1499. Both of her parents are represented in the composition. John II appears on the Gospel side, while Queen Isabella is shown on the Epistle side in one of the few surviving contemporary representations of her. She is depicted in prayer beside her patron saint, Saint Elizabeth, and Saint Elizabeth's son, John the Baptist, to whom the queen was especially devoted. Above her, two angels hold a shield bearing the arms of Castile and León and those of Portugal. (Note: The identification of the figures as John II and Isabella of Portugal is well documented, although they have sometimes been incorrectly identified as Isabella I of Castile and Ferdinand II of Aragon.) Busts of John II and Isabella of Portugal also appear in the spandrels of the chapel of the Virgin of Valvanera at the charterhouse.

Like her husband, Isabella used the emblem of the ristre, created by Álvaro de Luna in 1428 as an anti-Aragonese symbol. Six ristres therefore support her coat of arms on the façade of the Miraflores Charterhouse. Under the settlement reached between John II and Alfonso V of Aragon in 1453, the Castilian monarchs and the Infantes Isabella and Alfonso agreed to wear the Aragonese emblem of the Order of the Jar. In exchange, Alfonso V adopted the Order of the Scale, John II's personal emblem.

== Issue ==
Her children were:

- Isabella I of Castile. Married Ferdinand II of Aragon, she became Queen of Castile and united Aragon with Castile.
- Alfonso, Prince of Asturias who rebelled against his half-brother, Henry IV of Castile. He died of a sudden fever, either from plague or poisoning.

== Notes ==
Isabella of Portugal House of Aviz Cadet branch of the House of Burgundy Born: circa 1428 Died: 15 August 1496
Spanish royalty
Vacant Title last held by Maria of Aragon	Queen consort of Castile and León; 1447–1454	Vacant Title next held by Joan of Portugal
