= Illustrious Generation =

Sons of King João of Portugal and Philippa of Lancaster

The Ínclita Geração (often translated in English as "Illustrious Generation") is a term commonly used by Portuguese historians to refer to a group of 15th-century infantes (princes) of the House of Aviz, specifically the sons of King John I of Portugal and his wife Philippa of Lancaster (daughter of John of Gaunt): the future king Edward of Portugal; the future regent Peter of Coimbra; Prince Henry the Navigator; the constable John of Reguengos; and the martyr Ferdinand the Holy Prince.

== Members ==
The members of the illustrious generation are normally considered to be the five legitimate sons of John I and Philippa of Lancaster:

- Infante D. Duarte (1391–1438), later king Edward of Portugal (r. 1433–1438).
- Infante D. Pedro [Peter] (1392–1449), the first Duke of Coimbra (f.1416) and regent of Portugal from 1439 to 1448 during the minority of his nephew King Afonso V of Portugal.
- Infante D. Henrique (1394–1460), i.e. Henry the Navigator, from 1416 the first Duke of Viseu, and from 1420 master of the Order of Christ, a pioneer of the Portuguese discoveries.
- Infante D. Joao [John of Reguengos] (1400–1442), from 1418 master of the Portuguese Order of Saint James of the Sword and from 1431 Constable of Portugal.
- Infante D. Fernando [Ferdinand] (1402–1443), from 1434 master of the Order of Aviz, later a popular saintly martyr.

Some lists are expanded to include their sister Infanta D. Isabella (1397–1471), from 1430 duchess of Burgundy as consort of Duke Philip III the Good, and their older half-brother D. Afonso (1377–1461), the natural son of John I and Inês Peres, co-regent with Peter of Coimbra during the minority of King Afonso V in the 1440s, and from 1443 the first Duke of Braganza.

== Origins of the label ==
The appellation Ínclita Geração was originally coined by Portuguese poet Luís de Camões in his 16th-century epic Os Lusíadas (Canto IV, stanza 50), in reference to the legacy of King John I of Portugal:

Original Portuguese

Não consentiu a morte tantos anos
Que de Herói tão ditoso se lograsse
Portugal, mas os coros soberanos
Do Céu supremo quis que povoasse.
Mas, pera defensão dos Lusitanos,
Deixou Quem o levou, quem governasse
E aumentasse a terra mais que dantes:
Ínclita geração, altos Infantes.

Literal English Translation

Death did not consent that for so many years
Portugal could enjoy that felicitous Hero,
but the sovereign choirs
of the supreme Heaven wanted him among themselves,
But for the defense of the Lusitanians,
He who removed him, left behind those that would govern
and augment the land more than ever :
Illustrious generation, high Royal Princes.

== Relationships ==
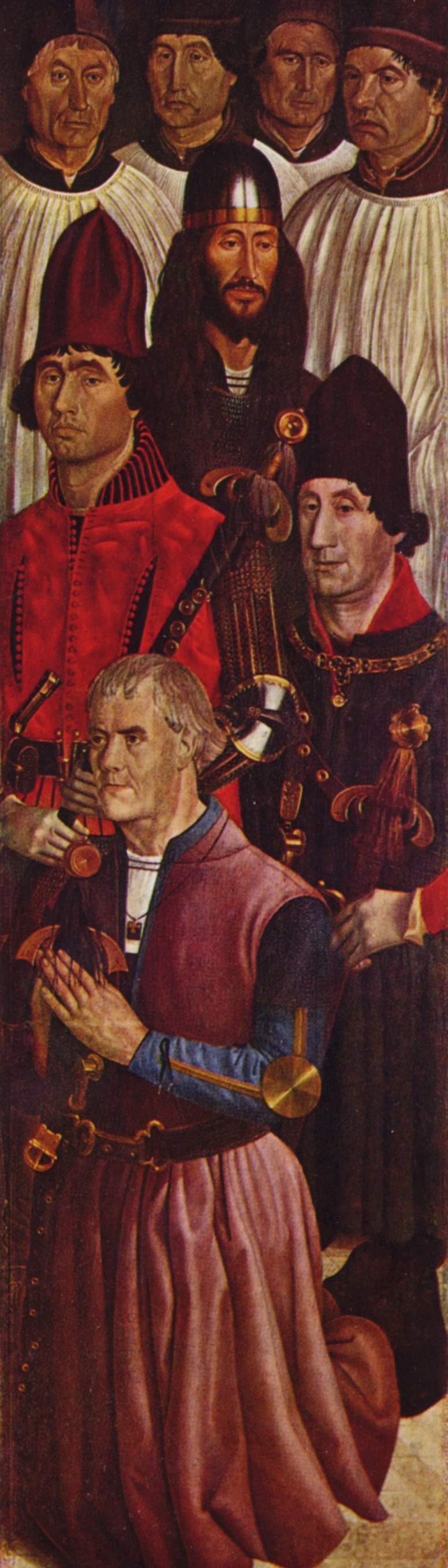
Panel of the famous polyptych of St. Vicent by painter Nuno Gonçalves, believed to represent the four younger sons of John I: Ferdinand the Holy (on top, in black), John of Reguengos (left, red), Peter of Coimbra (right, green), Henry the Navigator (bottom, purple)

According to the chronicler Gomes Eanes de Zurara, all of the five brothers participated in the conquest of Ceuta of 1415 and were knighted in the aftermath by their father, King John I, with arming swords supplied by their dying mother, Philippa of Lancaster. They began receiving their lordships shortly after, e.g. in 1416, Peter was made duke of Coimbra and Henry duke of Viseu, etc. John I also began to seize control of the main military orders of Portugal by securing from the pope the appointment of his sons as their grand masters. John took the Order of Saint James of the Sword in 1418, Henry the Order of Christ in 1420 and Ferdinand the Order of Aviz. John I appointed young John to succeed his loyal lieutenant Nuno Álvares Pereira as Constable of Portugal (i.e., high military chief) in 1431.

Despite the high titles, John I retained careful control over the activities of his sons, deploying them as deputies of his will, and not allowing them too much room for independent manoeuver, responsibility or authority. It is probably as a result of this that, through the 1420s, the princes dedicated themselves to individual pursuits - Edward to philosophy, Peter to celebrated tours of Renaissance Europe and Henry to his nautical charts. The "illustrious" label for this generation of princes refers in good part to their intellectual achievements. The nature of these accomplishments also justifies the inclusion of Isabella of Portugal in the list, as she helped transpose much of the Renaissance spirit and flair of the Burgundian court back to Medieval Lisbon.

It is really only after the death of their father in 1433 that the princes came into their own. Now king, Edward of Portugal ran his court almost jointly with his brothers, who were his intimate counsellors. Edward generously handed out lucrative benefices and monopolies to his brothers, giving them the means for independent action. Flush with new grants, Henry the Navigator's naval expeditions kicked into high gear after 1433.

Disagreements over policy soon produced fraternal fissures. In 1436, Edward assembled the Cortes of Évora to consider the ambitious scheme proposed by Henry the Navigator to conquer Tangiers from Morocco. Peter of Coimbra and John of Reguengos argued vigorously against the plan, urging Edward to focus on domestic priorities, but Ferdinand the Holy backed Henry's plan. Against Edward's misgivings, the plan went forward, with Henry personally leading the expeditionary force in 1437. It was a fiasco. The Portuguese army was quickly surrounded and starved into submission. The humiliation was complete when Henry agreed to deliver Ceuta back to the Marinids and left his youngest brother Ferdinand as hostage for the fulfillment of the treaty. Despite Peter and John's entreaties, the Portuguese Cortes refused to ratify the treaty, and left Ferdinand in captivity in Fez, Morocco, where he eventually died in 1443.

The Tangiers debacle and the harrowing fate of Prince Ferdinand may have contributed to Edward's premature death in 1438. The country was surprised by Edward's will, which appointed his consort Eleanor of Aragon, rather than his brothers, as regent of the kingdom on behalf of his young son, the new king Afonso V of Portugal. Many commoners believed the foreign-born Eleanor would be a pliable puppet of the Portuguese high aristocracy, who were itching to claw back the authority they lost to the burghers since the revolution of the 1380s. The country seemed to be careening towards civil war, when John of Reguengos, in his capacity as constable, quickly seized control of the city of Lisbon and assembled a burgher-packed Cortes that promptly elected his brother and ally Peter of Coimbra as regent. The Portuguese high nobility, now rallied around the half-brother Afonso, urged Eleanor to refuse to step down. The crisis was finally defused when Henry the Navigator offered to arbitrate between the parties; he negotiated a tense power-sharing arrangement between Peter, Eleanor and Afonso. For many commoners, who were steadfast behind Peter and John and believed they had the upper hand, Henry's intervention was not welcome.

Despite the strange regency agreement, Peter of Coimbra quickly seized the lion's share of power, buying off noble opponents one by one with promises of new titles and benefices (which he was not quick to fulfill). The death of John of Reguengos, Peter's loyal brother and ally in 1442, was a setback. But he quickly began to cultivate the support of the ambivalent Henry the Navigator, renewing and expanding his benefices, most notably granting him a lucrative monopoly on trade in Africa south of Cape Bojador in 1443. To seal his position and influence, Peter persuaded his nephew, the young king Afonso V, to marry his own daughter, Isabella of Coimbra, in 1445. By 1446, Peter felt confident enough to unveil his Afonsine Ordinances, a new Portuguese legal code uniting Visigothic, Roman and common law. The Portuguese burghers applauded the move, while the upper nobility was appalled and turned to the half-brother Afonso for redress.

Afonso's tense relationship with Peter had turned decidedly for the worse after the death of John of Reguengos in 1442, when Peter decided to appoint John's son, Diogo of Portugal, as the successor to his father's important title of Constable of Portugal, which had been promised to Afonso and his sons. Things only got worse after Diogo's sudden death in 1443, when, once again, Peter overlooked Afonso and appointed his own son, Peter of Portugal, as Constable. To appease Afonso, Peter of Coimbra created him the first Duke of Braganza in 1443.

The Afonsine Ordinances of 1446 brought the bulk of the nobility to rally behind the discontented Afonso and urged him to do something about it. Afonso set about ingratiating himself with the impressionable young King Afonso and soon displaced Peter as his favorite uncle.

In June 1448, Afonso V finally came of age and dismissed Peter of Coimbra as regent. The machinations of Afonso of Braganza soon bore fruit when, in September 1448, Afonso V nullified all of the edicts and laws passed under Peter's regency and began rooting out Peter's appointees and passing their positions over to Braganza's men.

In 1449, Peter of Coimbra gathered his loyalists, knights and bureaucrats who had been dismissed by Afonso V's purge and set out on what he claimed was a peaceful mass march on Lisbon to protest the dismissals and petition the king to allow his men to defend themselves against the false accusations being lobbed at them in court. But Afonso of Braganza persuaded Afonso V that Peter intended to lay siege to the city and provoke a popular uprising by the overwhelmingly supportive burghers. The latter interpretation gained currency, and Afonso V declared Peter a rebel and outlaw and led the royal army out to intercept his uncle's march. The armies met at the Battle of Alfarrobeira in May 1449. It was not much of a battle - Peter of Coimbra was killed by missile fire near the start, and his "army" quickly laid down their arms.

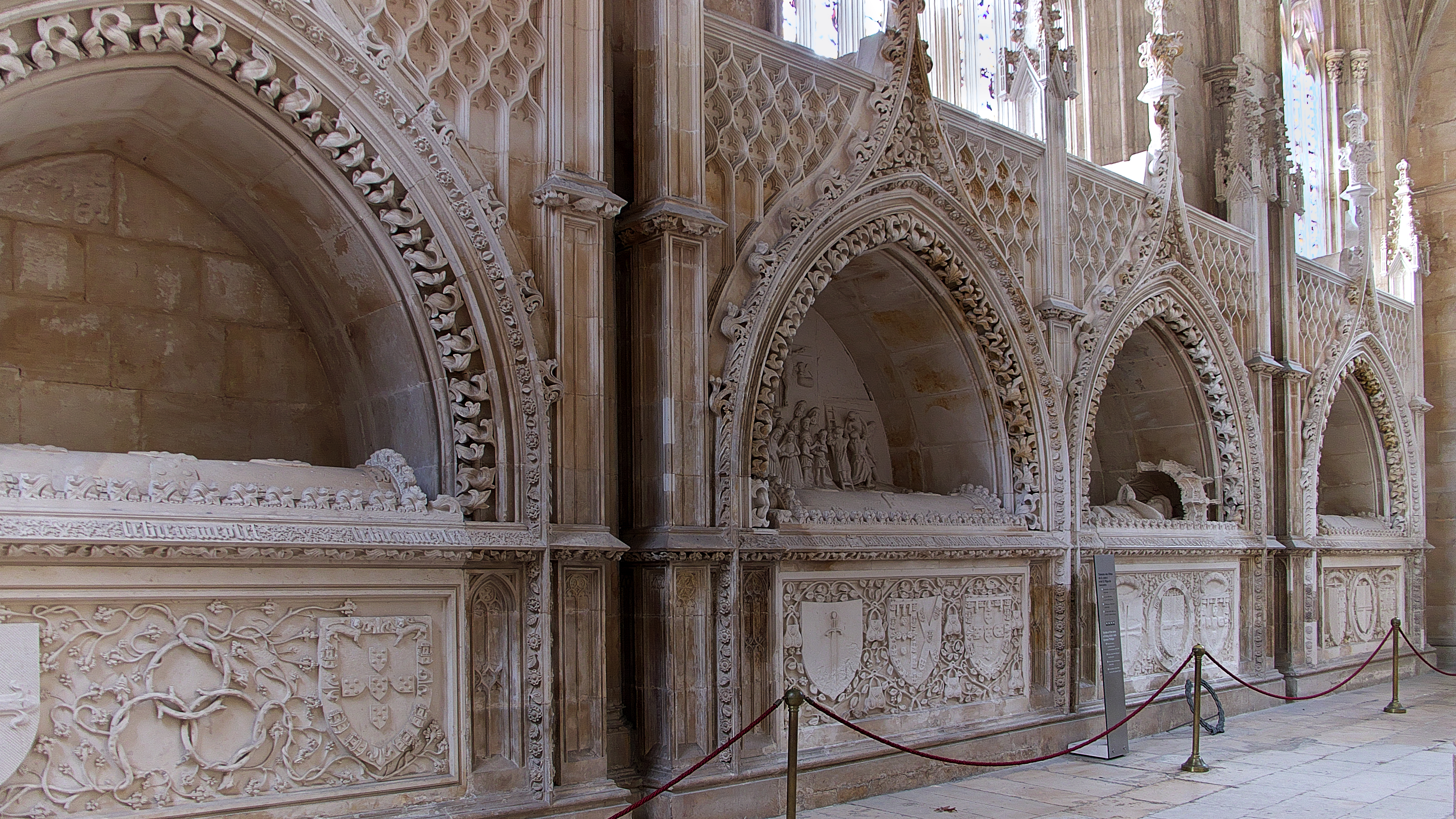
Tombs of the high princes, Founder's Chapel, Batalha Monastery. From left to right, Ferdinand the Holy, John of Reguengos, Henry the Navigator and Peter of Coimbra

The victory of Afonso of Braganza and the rest of the nobility was now complete, and they remained high in the saddle throughout the rest of Afonso V's reign. In the aftermath, Henry the Navigator, the last surviving member of the illustrious generation, went into near-hermitical seclusion in Sagres. Having allowed his household knights to join field with the king's army against Peter, Henry reputation as dynastic traitor was cemented in the popular mindset; he became thoroughly hated by Peter's partisans and the burghers. To the new order of Braganza and the high nobility, Henry was a useless relic, a quirky old man who liked to play with ships. Henry spent his last remaining years launching a new set of naval expeditions, stretching Portuguese discoveries as far as the Gold Coast of west Africa. Henry died in 1460, a bachelor without heirs, largely unlamented, save perhaps by the Order of Christ, whose fortunes he had so enlarged.

== See also ==
- Infantes of Aragon

== Sources ==
- Attreed, Lorraine (1999). "Friends in Need or in Deed? Anglo—Portuguese Relations in the Fifteenth Century". Mediterranean Studies. 8: 143–56.
- Gomes Eanes de Zurara (1450) Chronica de el-rei D. João I [1899-1900 edition, Lisbon: Escriptorio.vol. 1, vol. 2, vol. 3
- Gomes Eanes de Zurara (1453) Crónica dos feitos notáveis que se passaram na Conquista da Guiné por mandado do Infante D. Henrique or Chronica do descobrimento e conquista da Guiné. [Trans. 1896–99 by C.R. Beazley and E. Prestage, The Chronicle of the Discovery and Conquest of Guinea, London: Halyut, v.1, v.2
- Diffie, Bailey W.; Winius, George (1977). Foundations of the Portuguese empire, 1415-1580. Minneapolis: University of Minnesota Press.
- Russell, Peter E. (2000). Prince Henry "the Navigator": a life. New Haven: Yale University Press. ISBN 978-0-300-08233-3. OCLC 42708239.
