= Isabel of Barcelos =

Lady of the Portuguese nobility (1402–1466)

Isabel
- Lady of Reguengos de Monsaraz, Colares and Belas
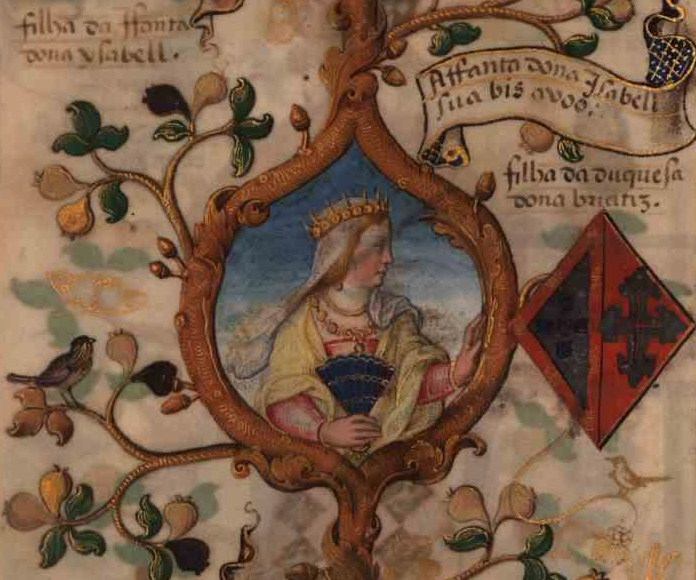
- Isabel in a 1534 miniature in the Genealogy of D. Manuel Pereira, 3rd Count of Feira
- Born: October 1402; Barcelos
- Died: 26 October 1466 (aged 63–64); Arévalo
- Burial: Batalha Monastery
- Spouse: John, Constable of Portugal
- House: Braganza
- Father: Afonso I, Duke of Braganza
- Mother: Beatriz Pereira de Alvim

Isabel of Barcelos (October 1402 – 26 October 1466), also known as Isabel of Braganza (Portuguese: Isabel de Bragança e Pereira), was a lady of the Portuguese nobility during the Late Middle Ages. She was the daughter of Afonso I, Duke of Braganza and Beatriz Pereira de Alvim, and she married Infante John, Lord of Reguengos de Monsaraz, her half-uncle, son of John I of Portugal.

== Issue ==
Isabel and Infante John had four children:

- Infante Diogo of Portugal (1425–1443) – 4th Constable of Portugal and 11th Master of the Order of St. James;
- Infanta Isabella of Portugal (1428–1496), married John II of Castile, mother of Isabella I of Castile
- Infanta Beatrice of Portugal (1430–1506), married Infante Ferdinand, Duke of Viseu, mother of Manuel I of Portugal
- Infanta Phillipa of Portugal (1432–1444), Lady of Almada

Isabel died in the town of Arévalo on 26 October 1466 at the age of sixty-four. She was buried in the Batalha Monastery alongside her husband.

== Ancestry ==
Ancestors of Isabel of Barcelos

8. Peter I of Portugal
4. John I of Portugal
9. Teresa Lourenço
2. Afonso I, Duke of Braganza
10. Pero Esteves, o Barbadão
5. Inês Pires
11. Maria Anes
1. Isabel of Barcelos
12. Álvaro Gonçalves Pereira
6. Nuno Álvares Pereira
13. Iria Gonçalves do Carvalhal
3. Beatriz Pereira de Alvim
14. João Pires de Alvim
7. Leonor de Alvim
15. Branca Pires Coelho
