= Beatriz Pereira de Alvim =

Portuguese noblewoman (1380–1414)

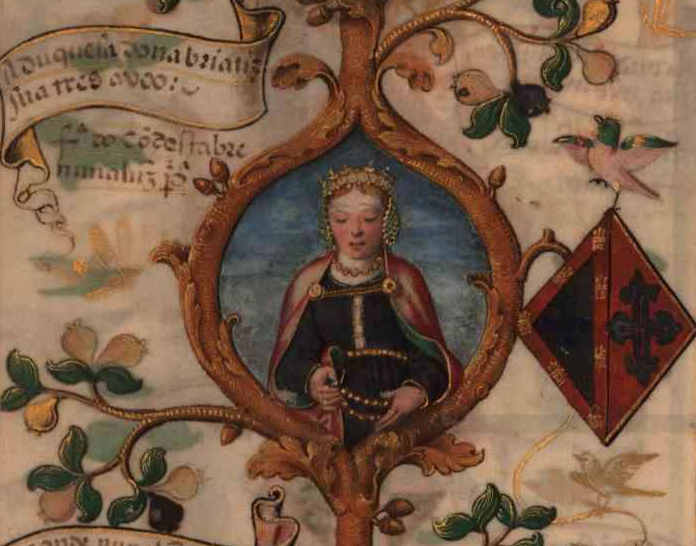
- Beatriz in a 1534 miniature in the Genealogy of D. Manuel Pereira, 3rd Count of Feira
- Born: 1380
- Died: 1414 (aged 33–34); Chaves
- Spouse: Afonso, Count of Barcelos (m. 1400)
- Father: Nuno Álvares Pereira
- Mother: Leonor de Alvim

Beatriz Pereira de Alvim (1380–1414) was a Portuguese noblewoman, the only child of Nuno Álvares Pereira and Leonor de Alvim.

== Marriage and issue ==
On 8 November 1401, she married Afonso, Count of Barcelos, illegitimate son of king John I of Portugal. She died before her husband became Duke of Braganza.

Afonso and Beatriz had three children.

- Afonso of Braganza (1400–1460), 4th Count of Ourém and 1st Marquis of Valença, had a natural son from Dona Brites de Sousa (some say they secretly married). His issue took the name de Portugal
- Isabella of Braganza (1402–1465), married her uncle Infante John, Lord of Reguengos, son of John I of Portugal
- Ferdinand I, Duke of Braganza (1403–1478), succeeded his father as second Duke of Braganza

== Bibliography ==
- Carvalho Correia, Francisco (2008). O Mosteiro de Santo Tirso de 978 a 1588: a silhueta de uma entidade projectada no chao de uma história milenária (in Portuguese). Santiago de Compostela: Universidade de Santiago de Compostela: Servizo de Publicacións e Intercambio Científico. ISBN 978-84-9887-038-1. Archived from the original on 2016-03-03.
- Sotto Mayor Pizarro, José Augusto (1987). Os Patronos do Mosteiro de Grijó (in Portuguese). Oporto. ISBN 978-0883-1886-37.
