= John, Constable of Portugal =

Portuguese prince and Constable of Portugal (1400–1442)

Infante John
- Constable of Portugal; Lord of Reguengos de Monsaraz, Colares and Belas
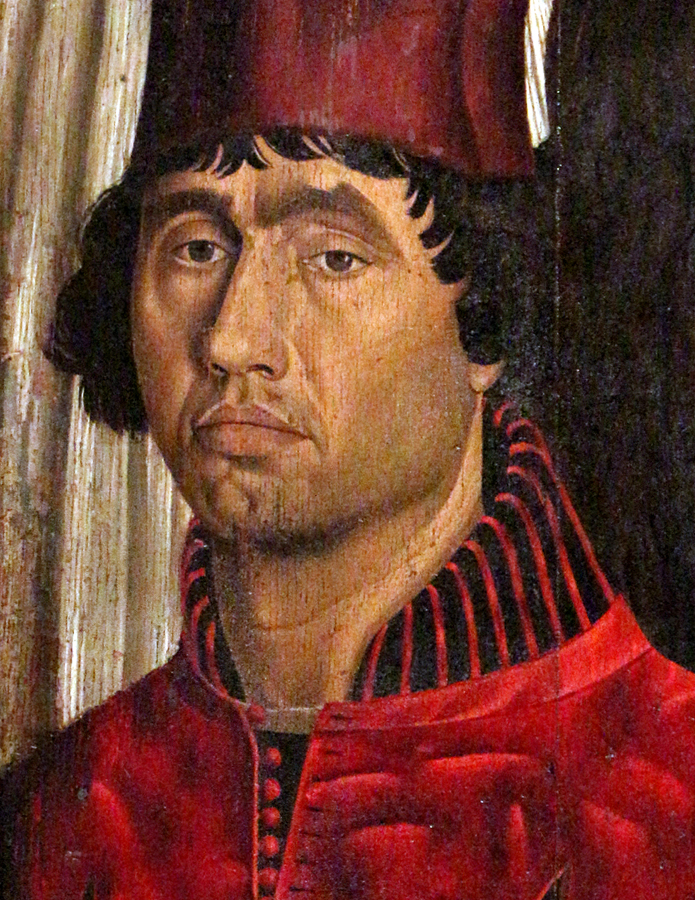
- Detail from the St. Vincent Panels by Nuno Gonçalves, often believed to be a portrait of John of Reguengos, the Constable Prince
- Born: 13 January 1400; Santarém, Portugal
- Died: 18 October 1442 (aged 42); Alcácer do Sal, Portugal
- Burial: Batalha Monastery
- Spouse: Isabella of Barcelos (m. 1424)
- Issue Detail: Infante Diogo, Constable of Portugal; Isabella, Queen of Castile; Infanta Beatrice, Duchess of Viseu
- House: Aviz
- Father: John I of Portugal
- Mother: Philippa of Lancaster

Infante John, Constable of Portugal (Portuguese: João, Portuguese pronunciation: [ʒuˈɐ̃w]; 13 January 1400 – 18 October 1442) was a Portuguese infante (prince) of the House of Aviz, Constable of Portugal and master of the Portuguese Order of St. James (Santiago). In Portugal, he is commonly referred to as the O Infante Condestável ("the Constable Prince").

== Early life ==
Infante John was the son of King John I of Portugal and his wife Philippa of Lancaster. John and his brothers Edward, Peter, Henry and Ferdinand, sister Isabella and half-brother Afonso, constitute what Portuguese historians have traditionally labelled the 'illustrious generation' (Ínclita Geração).

== Royal career ==
He was invested as the 1st Lord of Reguengos de Monsaraz, Colares and Belas shortly after. In October 1418, at the king's request, Pope Martin V approved the appointment of Infante John as the 10th Master of the Order of St. James of the Sword, bringing the old military order into the hands of the royal family. That same year (1418), John and his brother Henry the Navigator led a relief fleet to Ceuta and helped lift the Siege of Ceuta.

After the death of Nuno Álvares Pereira in 1431, Infante John was appointed the 3rd Constable of Portugal. As a result, John is frequently characterised by the appellation O Infante Condestável ("The Constable Prince").

Infante João was Lord of Reguengos de Monsaraz, Belas and Colares.

After King John I's death in 1433, John's eldest brother ascended the throne as king Edward of Portugal. In 1437, Infante John joined another brother Peter, Duke of Coimbra, in arguing against a projected Portuguese expedition to seize Tangier that led to the Battle of Tangier. The campaign ended in disaster. After the Tangier fiasco, John urged the ratification of a treaty with Marinid Morocco that called for the relinquishment of Ceuta in exchange for his captive brother Ferdinand the Holy Prince. The Cortes refused, and Ferdinand was left to die in captivity.

== Duke of Coimbra Rebellion ==
King Edward died in September 1438, leaving a young son to ascend the throne as king Afonso V of Portugal under the regency of his widow Eleanor of Aragon. This was an unpopular arrangement among the common people of the country, who feared Eleanor would be a puppet of the high nobility who sought to recover the political privileges they lost during the revolution of the 1380s. The prospect of civil war raised its head. To forestall a rebellion, Infante John quickly seized control of Lisbon and oversaw the assembly of a burgher-packed Cortes to elect his brother Peter of Coimbra as regent for his nephew Afonso V. The high nobility, led by his half-brother Afonso of Barcelos, urged Eleanor to hold fast, and a tense power-sharing regency arrangement was agreed upon between Peter and Eleanor.

Peter of Coimbra relied on his close alliance with Infante John to secure the lion's share of power during the first few years of the regency. Infante John's sudden death in October 1442 was a terrible blow to Peter, who thereafter found it increasingly difficult to fend off the aspirations of his half-brother Afonso of Barcelos and was eventually decisively defeated in the Battle of Alfarrobeira.

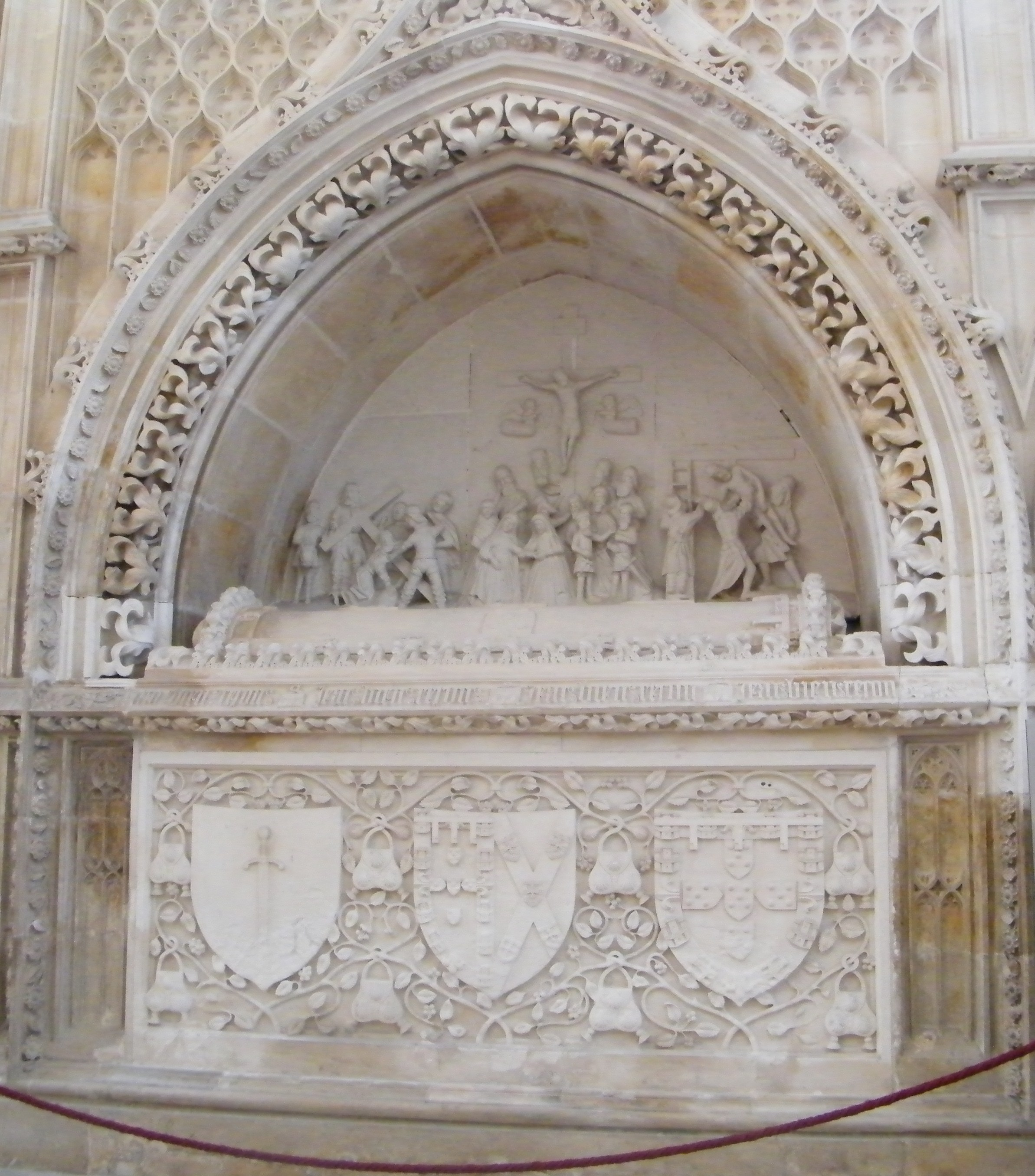
Sepulcher of Infante John and Isabella of Barcelos in Batalha Monastery

Regent Peter appointed John's son Diogo of Portugal to succeed his father as Master of the Order of Santiago and Constable of Portugal.

== Marriage and issue ==
In 1424, John married his half-niece Isabella of Barcelos, daughter of his half-brother Afonso of Barcelos. The couple had four children:

- Infante Diogo of Portugal (1425–1443) – 4th Constable of Portugal and 11th Master of the Order of St. James; no issue.
- Infanta Isabella of Portugal (1428–1496), married John II of Castile, mother of Isabella I of Castile.
- Infanta Beatrice of Portugal (1430–1506), married Infante Ferdinand, Duke of Viseu, mother of Manuel I of Portugal.
- Infanta Phillipa of Portugal (1432–1444), Lady of Almada.

== Ancestry ==
Ancestors of John, Constable of Portugal

8. Afonso IV of Portugal
4. Peter I of Portugal
9. Beatrice of Castile
2. John I of Portugal
10. Lourenço Martins
5. Teresa Lourenço
11. Sancha Martins
1. John, Constable of Portugal
12. Edward III of England
6. John of Gaunt, 1st Duke of Lancaster
13. Philippa of Hainault
3. Philippa of Lancaster
14. Henry of Grosmont, 1st Duke of Lancaster
7. Blanche of Lancaster
15. Isabel of Beaumont
