= Philippa of Lancaster =

Queen of Portugal from 1387 to 1415

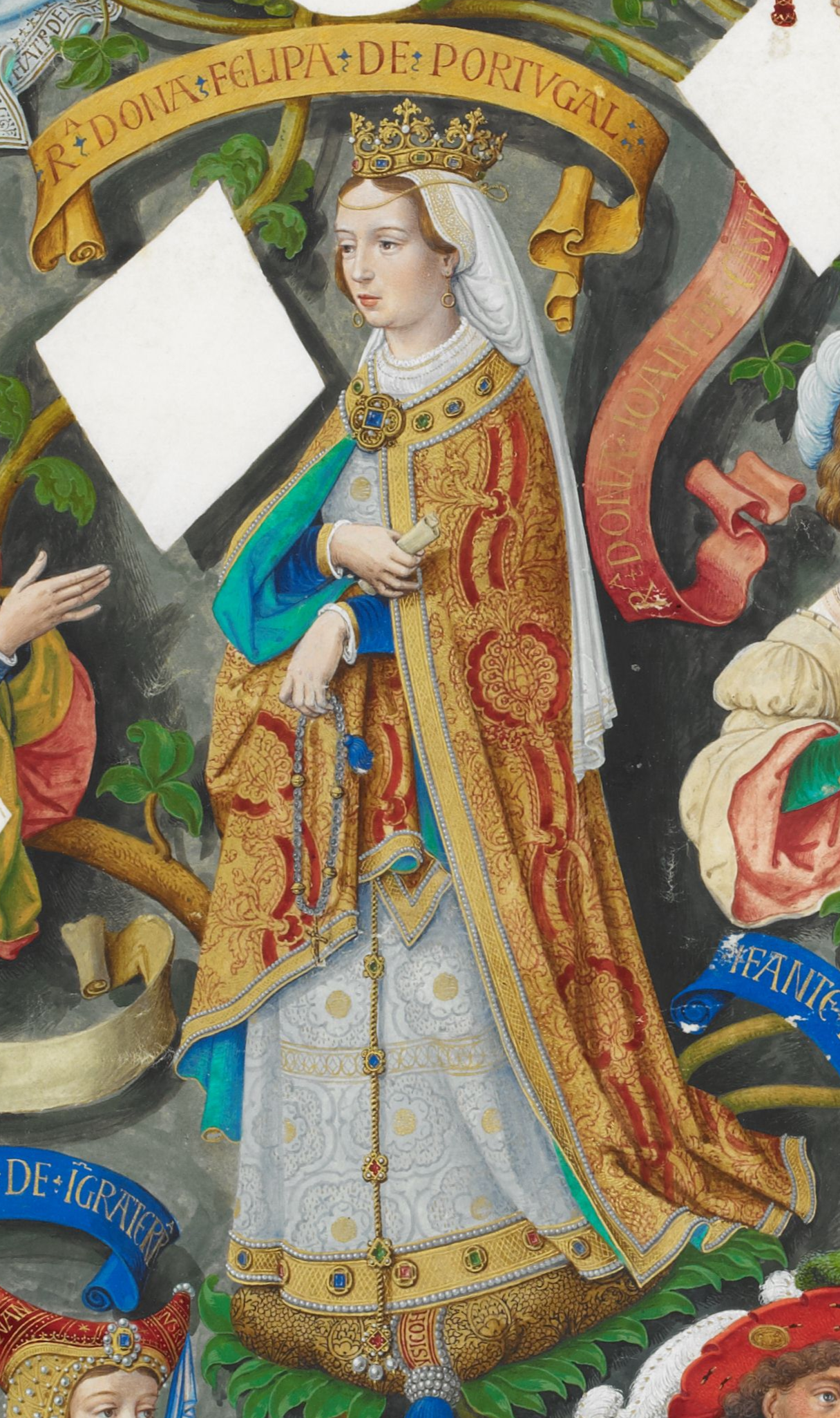
- Queen Philippa in Genealogia dos Reis de Portugal (António de Holanda; 1530–1534)

Queen consort of Portugal
- Tenure: 14 February 1387 – 19 July 1415
- Born: 31 March 1360; Leicester Castle, Leicester, England
- Died: 19 July 1415 (aged 55); Sacavém, Portugal
- Burial: Batalha Monastery
- Spouse: John I of Portugal (m. 1387)
- Issue among others...: Edward, King of Portugal; Peter, Duke of Coimbra; Henry, Duke of Viseu; Isabella, Duchess of Burgundy; John, Constable of Portugal; Ferdinand, Master of Aviz
- House: Lancaster
- Father: John of Gaunt, Duke of Lancaster
- Mother: Blanche of Lancaster

Philippa of Lancaster (Portuguese: Filipa [fiˈlipɐ]; 31 March 1360 – 19 July 1415) was Queen of Portugal from 1387 until 1415 as the wife of King John I. Born into the royal family of England, she was the daughter of John of Gaunt and granddaughter of Edward III of England. Her marriage secured the Treaty of Windsor and produced several children who became known as the "Illustrious Generation" in Portugal. She was the only Portuguese queen of English origin.

== Early life and education ==
Born on 31 March 1360, Philippa was the eldest child of John of Gaunt, 1st Duke of Lancaster, and Blanche of Lancaster. Philippa spent her infancy moving around the various properties owned by her family with her mother and her wet-nurse, Maud. Here, she was raised and educated alongside her two younger siblings, Elizabeth, who was three years younger, and Henry, seven years younger, who would later become King Henry IV. Philippa's mother, Blanche, died in 1368. Her father remarried in 1371 to Infanta Constance of Castile, daughter of King Peter of Castile, and on Constance's death in 1394, he married his former mistress, Katherine Swynford, who had been Philippa's governess. The affair and eventual marriage were considered scandalous, and in the future, Philippa would protect herself against such embarrassment.

Katherine seems to have been well liked by Philippa and her Lancastrian siblings and played an important role in Philippa's education. Katherine had close ties with Geoffrey Chaucer, since her sister, Philippa Roet, was Chaucer's wife. John of Gaunt became Chaucer's patron, and Chaucer spent much time with the family as one of Philippa's many mentors and teachers. She was remarkably well educated, especially for a woman at the time, and studied science under Friar John, poetry under Jean Froissart, and philosophy and theology under John Wycliffe. She was well read in the works of Greek and Roman scholars such as Pliny the Elder and Herodotus and was diligent in her study of religion.

== Queen of Portugal ==
Philippa became Queen consort of Portugal through her marriage to King John I. This marriage was the final step in the Anglo-Portuguese Alliance against the Franco-Castilian axis. The couple were blessed by the church in the Cathedral of Porto on 2 February 1387 and their marriage was on 14 February 1387. The Portuguese court celebrated the union for fifteen days. Philippa married King John I by proxy, and in keeping with a unique Portuguese tradition, the stand-in bridegroom pretended to bed the bride. The stand-in for King John I was João Rodrigues de Sá.

The marriage itself, as was usually the case for the nobility in the Middle Ages, was a matter of state and political alliance, and the couple did not meet until twelve days after they were legally married. Philippa was considered to be rather plain, and King João I (John I) already had a mistress, Inês Peres Esteves, by whom he had three children. Their son Afonso was ten when Philippa and John married. Philippa allowed Afonso and his sister Beatrice to be raised in the Portuguese court (the third child, Branca, died in infancy). Their mother left the court at Philippa's command to live in a convent, and under Philippa's patronage, she became the Prioress.

In marrying Philippa, John I established a political and personal alliance with John of Gaunt, initially because it was rumoured that John of Gaunt would claim the Kingdom of Castile through Catherine of Lancaster, his daughter by his second wife Constance of Castile. As the "de facto King of Castile," it was feared that John of Gaunt could challenge King John's claim to the newly installed dynasty. Instead, at Windsor in 1386, John I of Portugal signed the remarkably long-lasting Portuguese–English Alliance, which continued through the Napoleonic Wars and ensured Portugal's tenuous neutrality in World War II.

Philippa, at the age of 27, was thought to be too old to become a bride for the first time, and the court questioned her ability to bear the King's children; however, Philippa bore nine children, six of whom survived into adulthood.

=== Influence at court ===
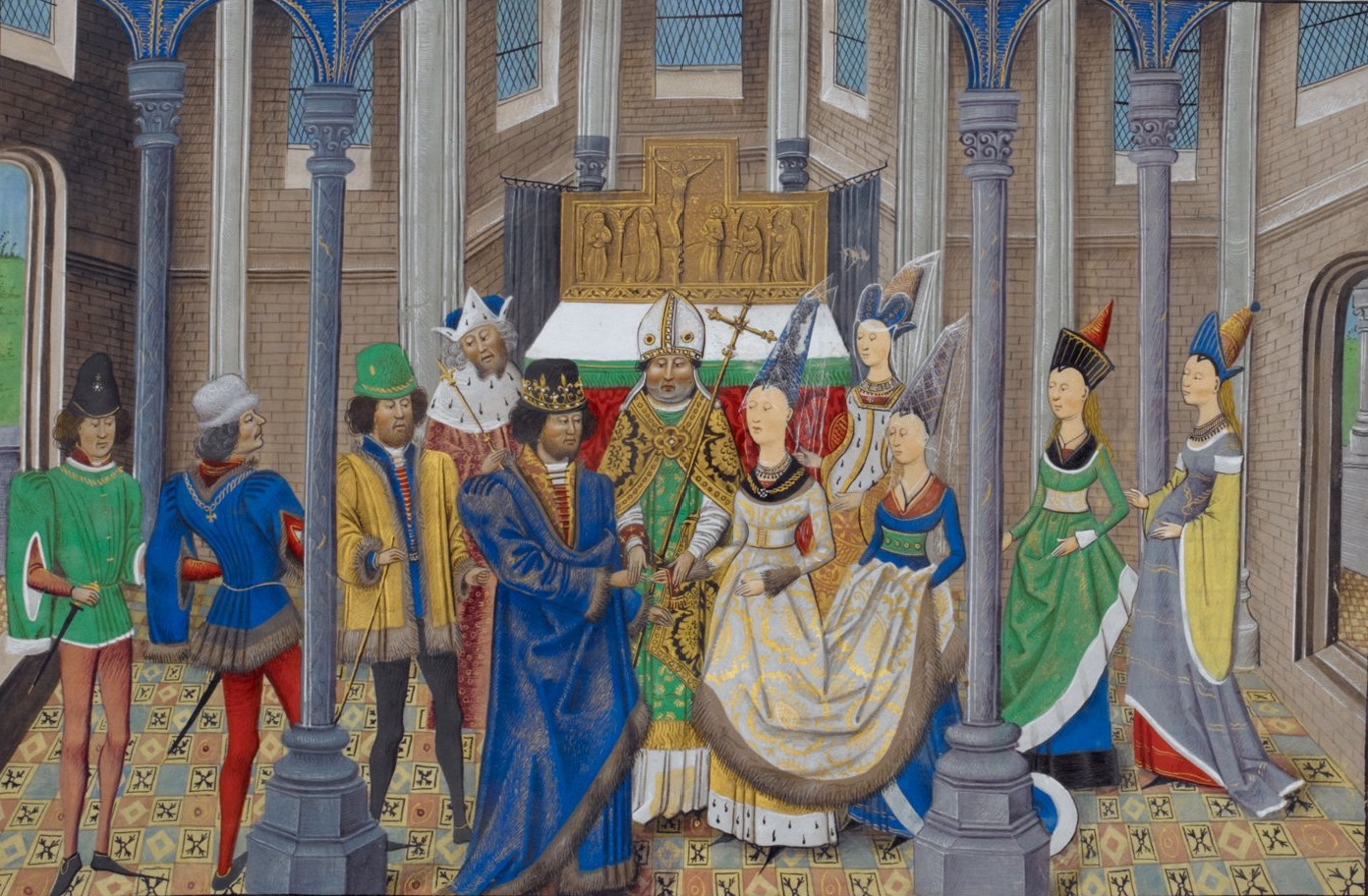
The wedding of Philippa and John

Though Philippa was seen to present a demeanour of queenly piety, commenting that "it would be regarded as an indecent thing for a wife to interfere in her husband's affairs", she wielded significant influence in both the Portuguese and English courts and was "actively involved in world affairs".

Surviving letters show that Philippa often wrote to the English court from Portugal and stayed involved in English politics. In one instance, Philippa intervened in court politics on "behalf of followers of the dethroned Richard II when they appealed for her help after her brother, Henry IV, had usurped the English throne". On another occasion, she persuaded a reluctant Thomas Fitzalan, 5th Earl of Arundel to marry her husband's illegitimate daughter Beatrice, further cementing the alliance between Portugal and England.

Philippa's main political contribution, however, was in her own court. Upon the end of the Portuguese involvement in several wars with Castile and the Moors, the Portuguese economy was failing, and many soldiers now unemployed. Philippa knew that the conquest and control of Ceuta would be quite lucrative for Portugal with the control of the African and Indian spice trade. Though Philippa died before her plan was realised, Portugal did send an expedition to conquer the city, a goal that was realised on 14 August 1415 in the Conquest of Ceuta.

=== Death ===
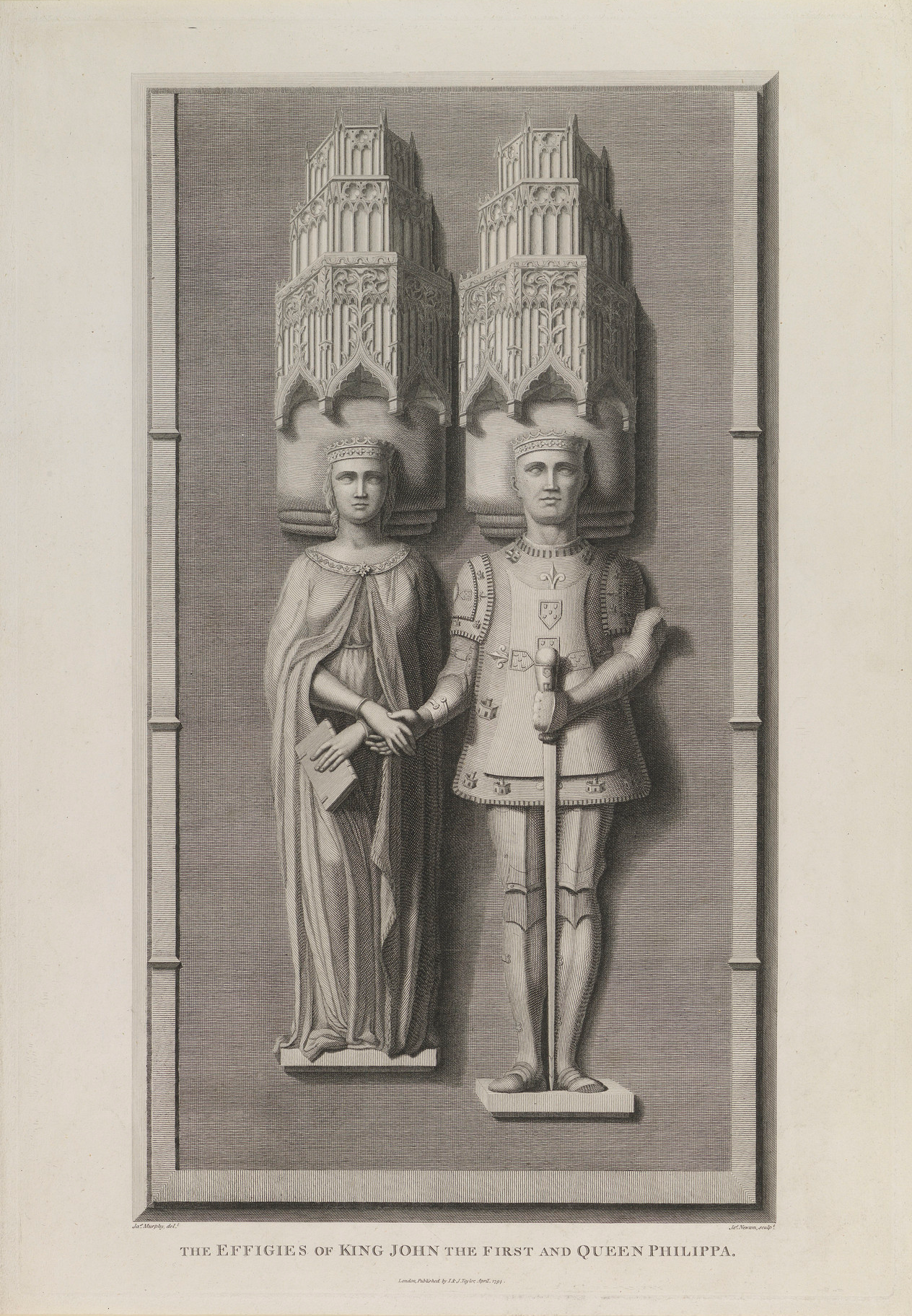
The Effigies of King John the First and Queen Philippa in their tombs at the Batalha Monastery

At the age of 55, Philippa fell ill with the plague. She moved from Lisbon to Sacavém and called her sons to her bedside so that she could give them her blessing. Philippa presented her three eldest sons with jewel-encrusted swords, which they would use in their impending knighthoods, and gave each a portion of the True Cross, "enjoining them to preserve their faith and to fulfil the duties of their rank".

Though he had been reluctant to marry her, the king had grown quite fond of his wife, and it is said that he was "so grieved by [her] mortal illness… that he could neither eat nor sleep". In her final hours, Philippa was said to be lucid and without pain. According to legend she was roused by a wind which blew strongly against the house and asked what wind it was, upon hearing it was the north wind, she claimed it quite beneficial for her son's and husband's voyage to Africa, which she had coordinated. At her death she prayed with several priests and, "without any toil or suffering, gave her soul into the hands of Him who created her, a smile appearing on her mouth as though she disdained the life of this world".

== Issue ==
Philippa was apparently a generous and loving queen, the mother of the "Illustrious Generation" (in Portuguese, Ínclita Geração) of infantes (princes) and infantas (princesses).

She had eight children:

- Blanche (13 July 1388 – 6 March 1389), died in infancy at the age of 7 months, in Lisbon, and was buried in Lisbon Cathedral
- Afonso (30 July 1390 – 22 December 1400), heir to the throne, died in childhood at the age of 10, in Braga, and was buried in Lisbon Cathedral
- Edward (31 October 1391 – 13 September 1438), a writer and an intellectual who succeeded his father as King of Portugal in 1433.
- Peter (9 December 1392 – 20 May 1449), Duke of Coimbra, a well-travelled man who served as regent during the minority of his nephew Afonso V.
- Henry (4 March 1394 – 13 November 1460), called "the Navigator", first Duke of Viseu, who guided Portugal to the Age of Discovery.
- Isabella (21 February 1397 – 11 December 1471), married Philip III of Burgundy.
- John (13 January 1400 – 18 October 1442), Constable of Portugal, Lord of Reguengos, grandfather of two 16th-century Iberian monarchs (Manuel I of Portugal and Isabella I of Castile).
- Ferdinand (29 September 1402 – 5 June 1443), called "the Saint Prince", a warrior who was captured during the Disaster of Tangier in 1437 and died a prisoner of the Moors.

== Legacy ==
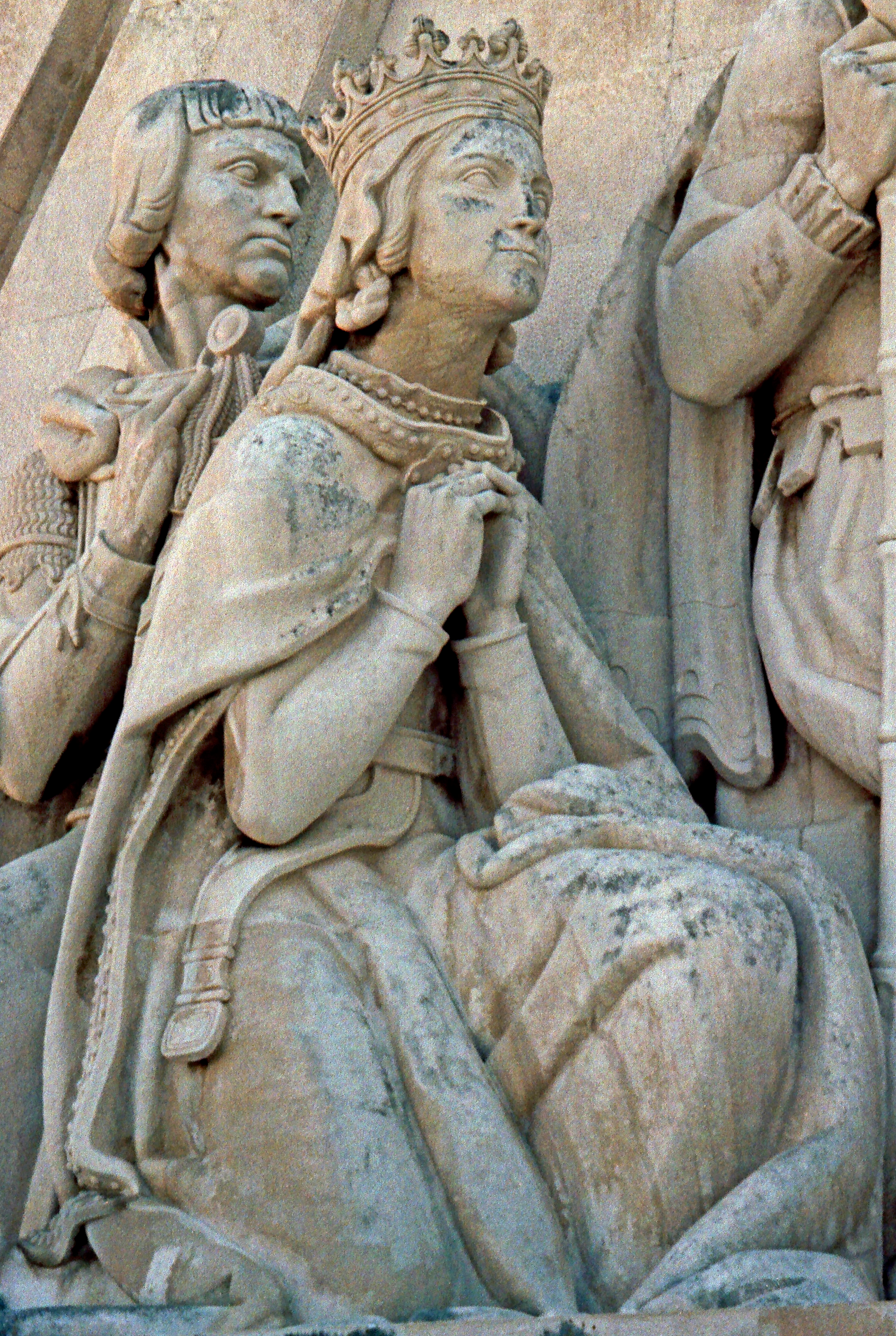
Queen Philippa represented on the Monument to the Discoveries (Portuguese: Padrão dos Descobrimentos) in Lisbon, Portugal

Philippa and King John's union was praised for establishing purity and virtue in a court that was regarded as particularly corrupt. She introduced reforms to the royal court, including to religious practices.

Philippa is remembered as the mother of "The Illustrious Generation" (Portuguese: Ínclita Geração). Her surviving children went on to make historically significant contributions in their own right. Edward became the eleventh King of Portugal, and was known as, "The Philosopher," or the "Eloquent". Henry the Navigator sponsored expeditions to Africa.

Philippa is the only woman represented on the Monument of the Discoveries (Portuguese: Padrão dos Descobrimentos) on the northern bank of the Tagus River estuary in Santa Maria de Belém, Lisbon, Portugal.

Philippa's influence was documented in literary works. The medieval French poet Eustache Deschamps dedicated one of his ballads to "Phelippe en Lancastre," as a partisan of the Order of the Flower. It has also been speculated that English writer Geoffrey Chaucer may have alluded to Philippa in his poem, "The Legend of Good Women," through the character Alceste.

== Ancestry ==
Ancestors of Philippa of Lancaster

8. Edward II of England
4. Edward III of England
9. Isabella of France
2. John of Gaunt, 1st Duke of Lancaster
10. William I, Count of Hainaut
5. Philippa of Hainault
11. Joan of Valois
1. Philippa of Lancaster
12. Henry, 3rd Earl of Lancaster
6. Henry of Grosmont, 1st Duke of Lancaster
13. Maud Chaworth
3. Blanche of Lancaster
14. Henry of Beaumont, 1st Baron Beaumont
7. Isabel of Beaumont
15. Alice Comyn

== Bibliography ==
- Armitage-Smith, Sydney (1905). John of Gaunt: King of Castile and Leon, Duke of Aquitaine and Lancaster, Earl of Derby, Lincoln, and Leicester, Seneschal of England. Charles Scribner's Sons.
- von Barghahn, Barbara (2013). Jan Van Eyck and Portugal's 'Illustrious Generation'. Vol. I: Text. Pindar Press.
- Beazley, Raymond C. (1923). Prince Henry the Navigator. New York: G.P Putnam's Sons.
- Birmingham, David (2003). A Concise History of Portugal (Second ed.). Cambridge: Cambridge University Press. ISBN 9780521536868.
- Bouza Serrano, Joana (2009). As Avis: As Grandes Rainhas que Partilharam o Trono de Portugal na Segunda Dinastia (in Portuguese). Lisbon: A Esfera dos Livros.
- Major, Richard H. (1967). The Life of Prince Henry the Navigator. London: Frank Cass & Co.
- Marques, Oliveira (1971). Daily Life in Portugal in the Late Middle Ages. Madison: University of Wisconsin.
- Jambeck, Karen K. (1996). "Patterns of Women's Literary Patronage: England, 1200 - ca. 1475". In McCash, June H. (ed.). The Cultural Patronage of Medieval Women. Athens: University of Georgia.
- Mosley, Charles, ed. (1999). Burke's Peerage and Baronetage. Vol. I (106th ed.). Crans, Switzerland: Burke's Peerage (Genealogical Books) Ltd.
- de Oliveira, A. Coreira (1955). Dom João I. e o Condes Tável: Livro de Leitura da 3a Classe. Lisboa: Ministro da Educação Nacional.
- Oliveira, Ana Rodrigues (2010). Rainhas Medievais de Portugal. A Esfera dos Livros.
- Prestage, Edgar (1966). The Portuguese pioneers. London: Adam & Charles Black.
- von Redlich, Marcellus Donald R. (1941). Pedigrees of Some of the Emperor Charlemagne's Descendants. Vol. I.
- Russell, Peter E. (2000). Prince Henry "the Navigator": a life. New Haven: Yale University Press.
- Sanceau, Elaine (1945). Henry the Navigator; the story of a great prince and his times. New York: Hytchinson & Co.
- Stephens, Henry Morse (1903). The story of Portugal. G.P. Putnam's Sons. p. 139. ISBN 9780722224731.

Philippa of Lancaster House of Lancaster Cadet branch of the House of Plantagenet Born: 31 March 1360 Died: 19 July 1415
Portuguese royalty
Vacant Title last held by Leonor Teles	Queen consort of Portugal; 11 February 1387 – 19 July 1415	Vacant Title next held by Eleanor of Aragon
