= Peter, Duke of Coimbra =

Infante Peter
- Duke of Coimbra
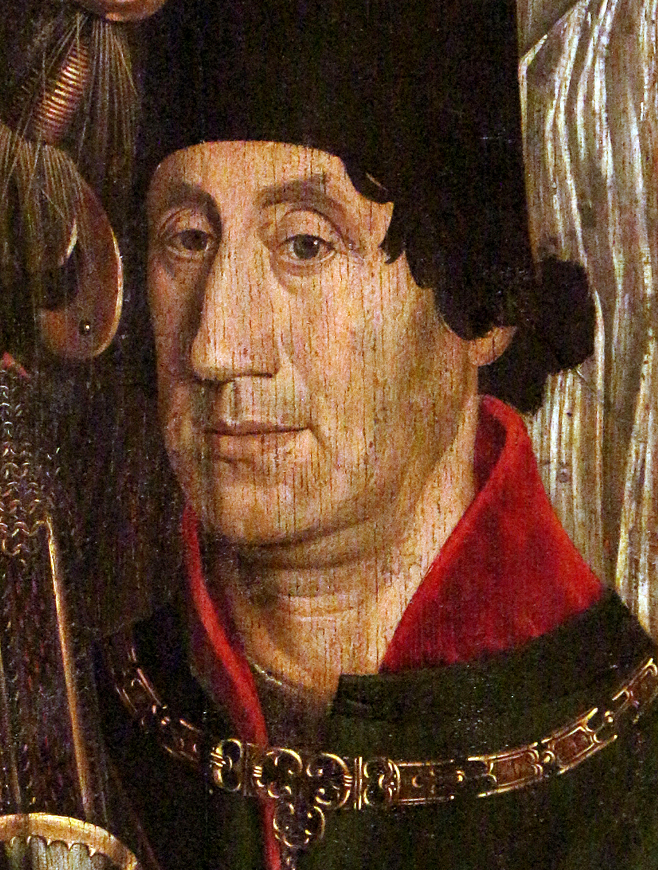
- Detail from the St Vincent Panels by Nuno Gonçalves, often believed to be a portrait of Peter

Regent of Portugal
- Tenure: 1439 – 1448
- Monarch: Afonso V
- Born: 9 December 1392; Lisbon, Portugal
- Died: 20 May 1449 (aged 56); Alverca, Portugal
- Burial: Batalha Monastery
- Spouse: Isabella of Urgell (m. 1428)
- Issue: Peter, Constable of Portugal; John, Prince of Antioch; Isabella, Queen of Portugal; James, Archbishop of Lisbon; Beatrice, Lady of Ravenstein; Philippa of Coimbra
- House: Aviz
- Father: John I of Portugal
- Mother: Philippa of Lancaster

Dom Peter, Duke of Coimbra, KG (Portuguese: Pedro Portuguese pronunciation: [ˈpeðɾu]; 9 December 1392 – 20 May 1449) was a Portuguese infante (prince) of the House of Aviz, son of King Dom John I of Portugal and his wife, Philippa of Lancaster, daughter of John of Gaunt. In Portugal, he is known as Infante Dom Pedro das Sete Partidas [do Mundo], "of the Seven Parts [of the World]" because of his travels. Possibly the best-travelled prince of his time, he was regent between 1439 and 1448. He was also 1st Lord of Montemor-o-Velho, Aveiro, Tentúgal, Cernache, Pereira, Condeixa and Lousã.

== Early life ==
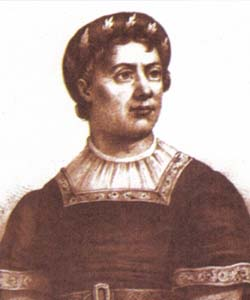
Infante Peter, Regent of the Kingdom of Portugal.

From the time he was born, Peter was one of John I's favourite sons. Along with his siblings, he received an exceptional education rarely seen in those times for the children of royalty. Close to his brothers Edward, the future king of Portugal, and John, Lord of Reguengos de Monsaraz, Peter grew up in a calm environment free of intrigues.

On 14 August 1415, he accompanied his father and brothers Edward and Henry for the Battle of Ceuta in Morocco. His mother had died the previous month, giving each of her sons on her deathbed an arming sword she had ordered forged for them. Peter refused to be knighted before showing valour in battle, and he was knighted along with his brothers the following day; he was also created Duke of Coimbra. His younger brother Henry was made Duke of Viseu. These were the first dukedoms created in Portugal.

On finishing a translation of Seneca's De Beneficiis in 1418, he initiated extensive travels throughout Europe, which would keep him away from Portugal for the next ten years. After meeting with John II of Castile in Valladolid, he continued to Hungary, where he met with the Holy Roman Emperor Sigismund, and entered his service. He fought with the Imperial armies against the Turks and in the Hussite Wars in Bohemia and was awarded the march of Treviso in Northern Italy in 1422. In 1424 he left the Holy Roman Empire, meeting first with Murad II, Sultan of the Ottoman Empire, on the island of Patmos, and then continuing to Constantinople, capital of the Byzantine Empire; the hopeless position of the city against the Ottoman onslaught did not fail to impress him. From Constantinople he travelled to the Holy Land via Alexandria and Cairo.

== European travels ==
In 1425, Peter travelled to France and England and visited the universities of Paris and Oxford before arriving in Flanders in 1426, where he spent the next two years at the Burgundian court. After the death of the second wife of Philip the Good of Burgundy in 1425, Peter recommended his sister Isabella to him as a wife. Philip sent a delegation to Portugal in 1428–29 that included Jan van Eyck, who painted two portraits of the Infanta. Philip and Isabella eventually married on 7 January 1430, and one of their sons became Duke Charles the Bold of Burgundy.

In 1427, Peter wrote a famous letter to his older brother, later King Edward, on "the proper administration of the kingdoms", from Bruges. Later that year, King Henry VI of England (his first cousin once removed) made him a Knight of the Garter (as were already his father and older brother Edward).

In 1428, Peter visited his marquisate of Treviso and the nearby Republic of Venice, where he was presented with a copy of the book of Marco Polo by the doge. He later gave that book, as well as maps of the Venetian trade routes in the Orient, to his younger brother Prince Henry the Navigator. One of the maps was created by the famous Venetian cartographer Albertinus de Virga in 1411 and possibly shows North America before it was officially discovered. This map was found in the Alcobaça Monastery which was the main library of the Portuguese Royal family. From Venice he traveled to Rome, where he was received by Pope Martin V, and from there he continued to Barcelona, where he negotiated the marriage of his brother Edward with Eleanor of Aragon as well as his own future marriage with Isabella of Urgell, before finally returning to Portugal.

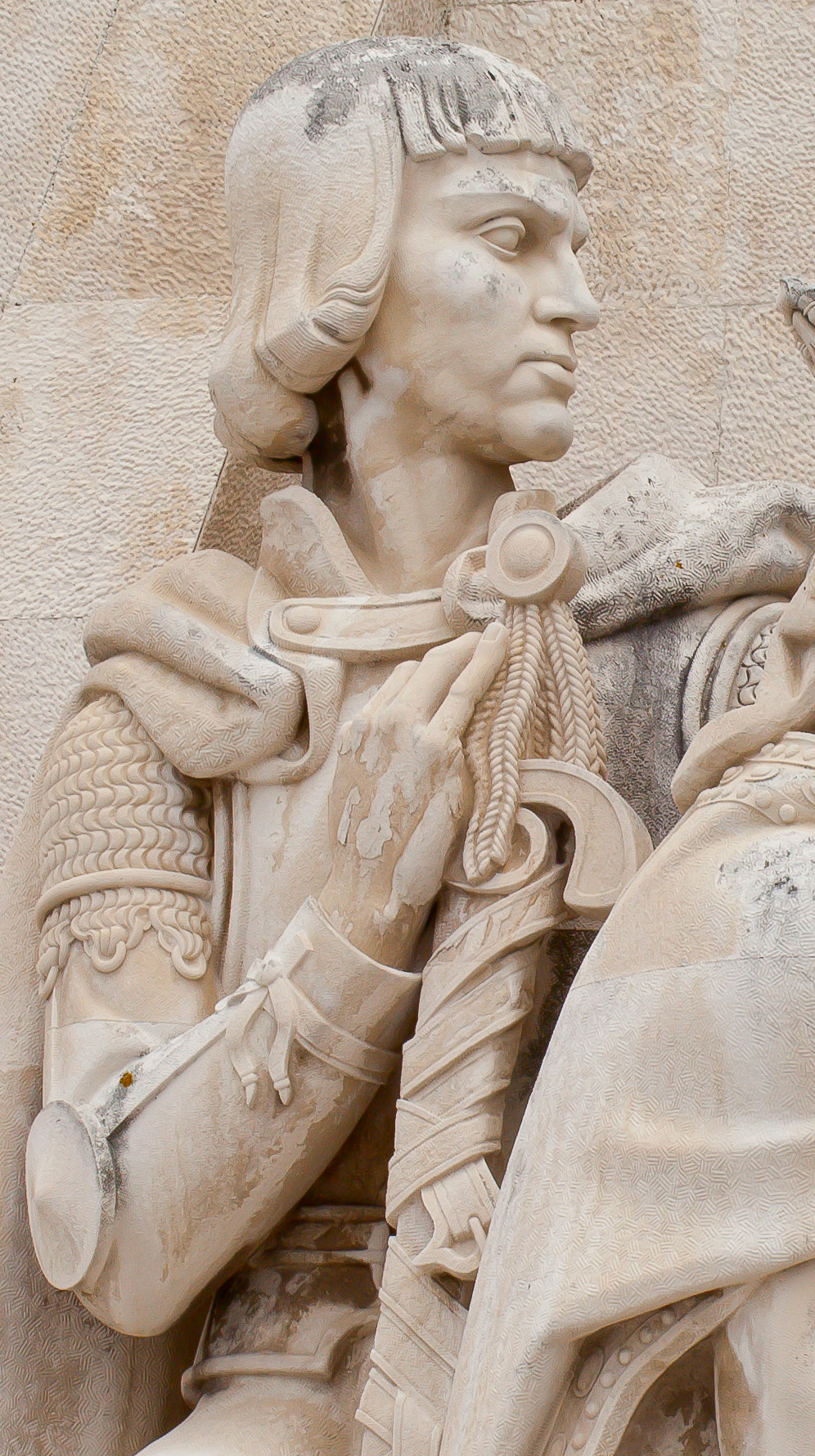
Effigy of Peter, Duke of Coimbra, in the Monument of the Discoveries, in Lisbon, Portugal.

In 1433, he completed his famous six-volume work, the Tratado da Virtuosa Benfeitoria.

== Regent ==
When Peter's brother King Edward I of Portugal died in 1438, Peter's nephew Afonso V ascended the throne as an infant. At first, the choice for regent was the Queen mother Eleanor of Aragon. This choice was not popular among many Portuguese, because Eleanor was Aragonese. Among the Portuguese aristocracy, however, especially among nobles around Peter's half-brother Afonso, Count of Barcelos, Eleanor of Aragon was preferred. There were also doubts about Peter's political ability. At a meeting of the Portuguese Cortes summoned by Peter's brother John, Lord of Reguengos de Monsaraz, Peter was appointed regent, a choice that pleased both the people and the fast-growing bourgeoisie.

In 1443, in a gesture of reconciliation, Peter created his half-brother Afonso Duke of Braganza, and relations between the two seemed to return to normality. But, in 1445, the new duke of Braganza took offence because Isabella of Coimbra, Peter's daughter was the choice for Afonso V's wife, and not one of his granddaughters. Indifferent to the intrigues, Peter continued his regency and the country prospered under his influence. It is during this period that the first subsidies for the exploration of the Atlantic Ocean were implemented under the auspices of Peter's brother Henry the Navigator.

== Alleged Rebellion ==
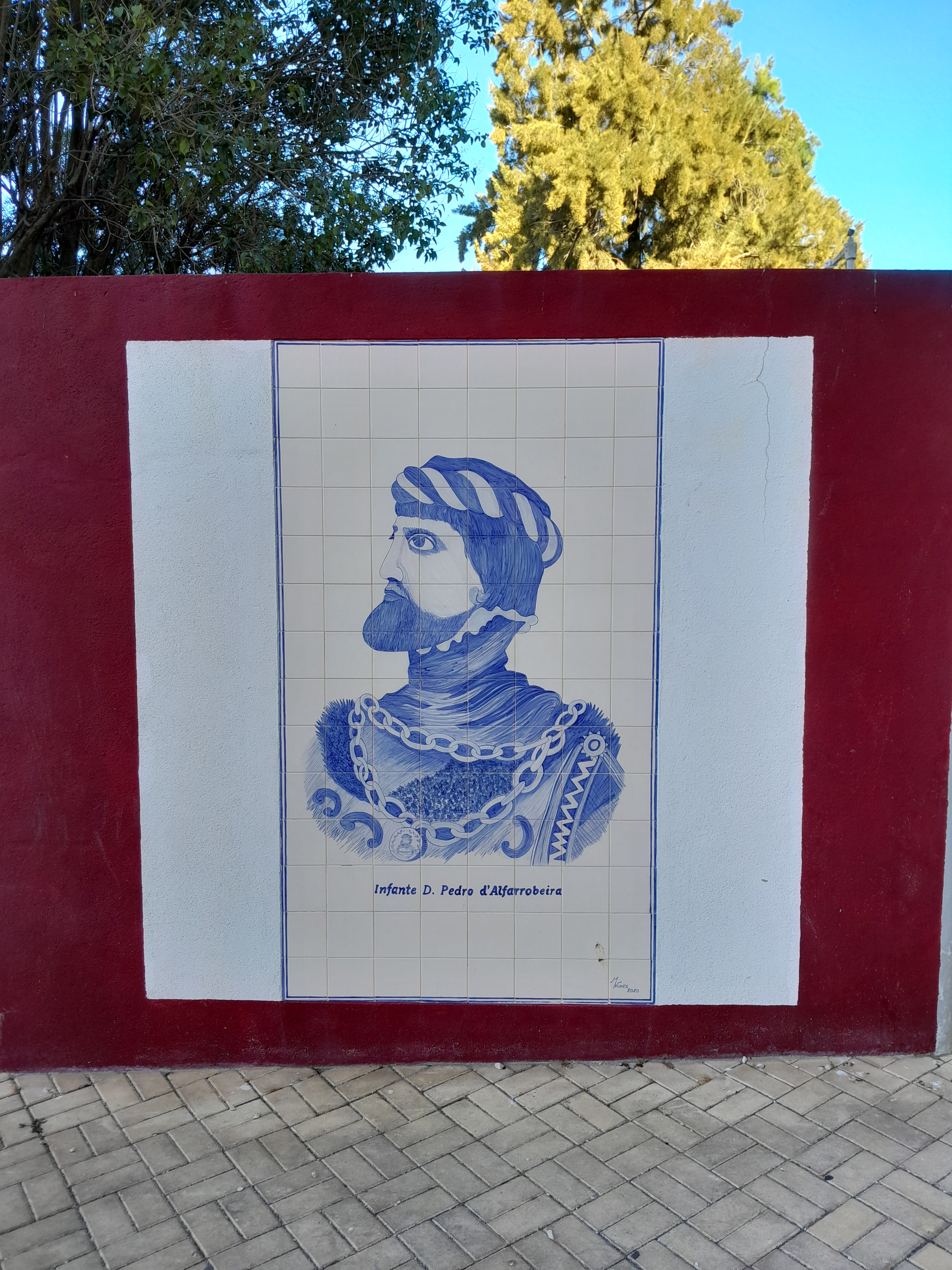
Monument in suburbs of Lisbon

On 9 June 1448, Peter returned control of the country to the king. Influenced by Afonso, the Duke of Braganza, Afonso V nullified all of Peter's edicts, including the ones that concentrated power in the figure of the king.

The following year, under accusations that years later would prove false, Afonso V declared Peter a rebel. The situation became unsustainable and a civil war began. It did not last long, because Peter died on 20 May 1449 during the Battle of Alfarrobeira, near Alverca. The exact conditions of his death are debatable: some say it was in combat, while others say he was assassinated by one of his own men.

With the death of Peter, Portugal fell under control of Afonso, Duke of Braganza, with a growing influence over the destiny of the country. However, Peter's regency would never be forgotten, and Peter was cited many times by his grandson King John II of Portugal as his main influence. The cruel persecution of the Braganzas by John II was perhaps the response to the conspiracies that caused the fall of one of the major princes of the Ínclita Geração.

== Marriage and issue ==
The Duke of Coimbra's arms.

In 1428 Peter married Isabella of Urgell, daughter of James II, Count of Urgell, and candidate to the Catalan confederation of counties and realms that included the throne of the Crown of Aragon, at the Compromise of Caspe. The couple had the following children:

- Infante Peter (1429–1466), Constable of Portugal, Count of Barcelona and disputed King of Aragon.
- Infante John (1431–1457), married Charlotte of Lusignan, heiress of Cyprus, in 1456. He was created titular Prince of Antioch, and was possibly poisoned by his mother-in-law.
- Infanta Isabella (1432–1455), Queen of Portugal by marriage to Afonso V of Portugal. Mother of John II of Portugal.
- Infante James (1433–1459), Cardinal and Archbishop of Lisbon, lived in Italy; his tomb is in the convent church of San Miniato al Monte in Florence.
- Infanta Beatrice (1435–1462), married Adolph of Cleves, Lord of Ravenstein.
- Infanta Philippa (1437–1493), a nun in the Convent of Odivelas.
- Catherine (c. 1448 – between 1462 and 1466)

== Bibliography ==
- The Dukes of Coimbra General Books LLC, 2010.
- Elbl, Ivana, "Friendship, Disasters, and Social Capital: The Silva Meneses, 1415-1481" – Portuguese Studies Review, Volume 30, Issue 1, 2022, pages 39–82. Available at https://trentu.academia.edu/ivanaElbl . Accessed 7 May 2023. Deals with the Duke of Coimbra, his marriage to Isabella of Urgell, his son, his allies and friends and servants, including Aires Gomes de Silva.
- Galvão, António (1563), Tratado... dos diuersos & desuayrados caminhos, por onde nos tempos passados a pimenta & especearia veyo da India às nossas partes, & assi de todos os descobrimentos antigos & modernos, que são feitos até a era de mil & quinhentos & cincoenta [Treatise on the Various and Sundry Ways that in Times Past Pepper and Spices Came from India to Our Parts & Also on All of the Discoveries Ancient & Modern Which Were Made up to the Year 1550] (PDF), Lisbon: Joam da Barreira. (in Portuguese)
- Galvano, Antonio (1862) [Portuguese version 1563, original translation 1601], The Discoveries of the World, from Their First Original unto the Year of Our Lord 1555, Translated & edited by Richard Hakluyt, edited by C.R.D. Bethune, London: T. Richards for the Hakluyt Society. (in English and Portuguese)
- Sir G.F.Hill, History of Cyprus (1940), (2nd ed. CUP, 2010), vol.1 of 4. ISBN 1-108-02064-X

Peter, Duke of Coimbra House of Aviz Cadet branch of the House of Burgundy Born: 9 December 1392 Died: 20 May 1449
Portuguese royalty
New title	Duke of Coimbra; 1415–1449	Vacant Title next held by Jorge of Lencastre
Political offices
Preceded by Eleanor of Aragon	Regent of Portugal; 1439–1448	Vacant Title next held by Joanna of Portugal
