= Afonso I, Duke of Braganza =

Portuguese nobleman, founder of the House of Braganza (1377–1461)

Afonso I
- Duke of Braganza
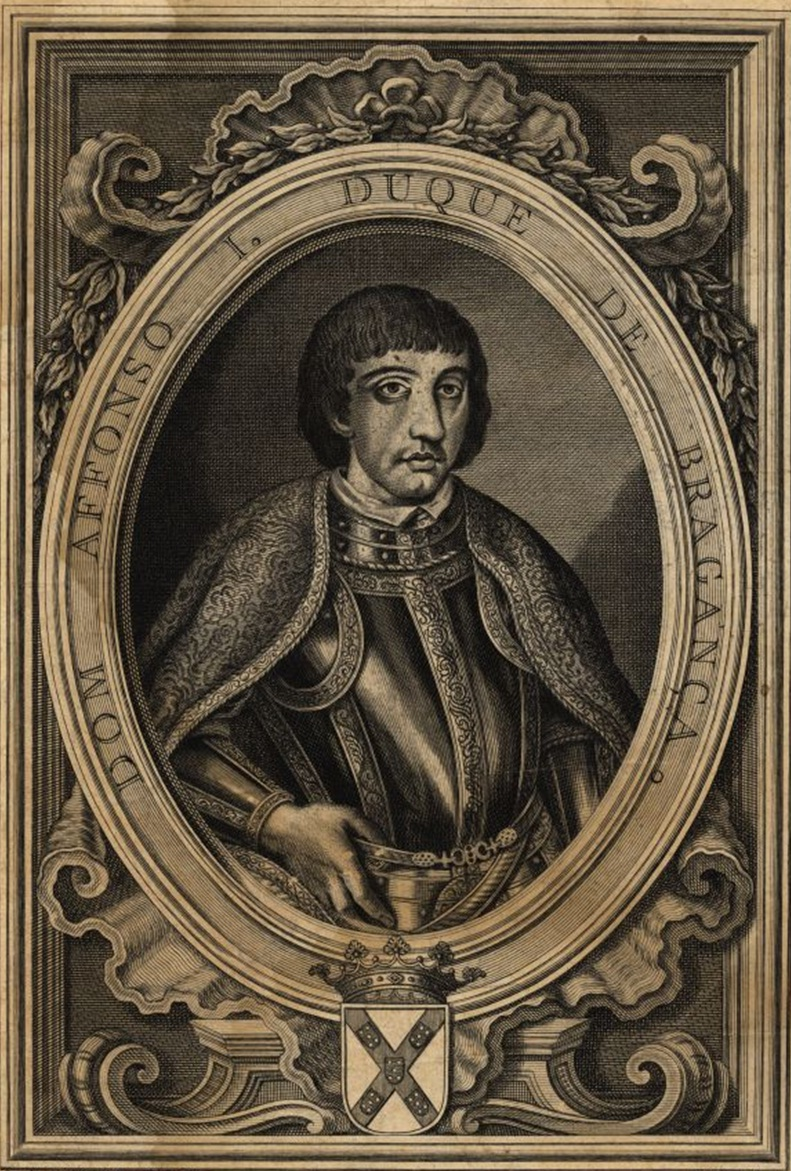
- posthumous engraving; Carlos António Leoni
- Tenure: 30 December 1442 – 15 December 1461
- Born: 10 August 1377; Veiros, Estremoz, Alentejo, Portugal
- Died: 15 December 1461 (aged 84); Chaves, Trás-os-Montes, Portugal
- Family: House of Braganza
- Spouses: Beatriz Pereira de Alvim (m. 1400, d. 1415); Constance de Noronha
- Issue Detail: Afonso, 1st Marquis of Valença; Isabella, Lady of Reguengos de Monsaraz; Fernando I, Duke of Braganza
- Father: John I of Portugal
- Mother: Inês Peres

Dom Afonso I of Braganza (Portuguese pronunciation: [ɐˈfõsu]; 10 August 1377 – 15 December 1461) was the first duke of Braganza and the eighth count of Barcelos. He founded the House of Braganza, the most powerful and wealthy dynasty in Portugal. His descendants became high-ranking nobles, imperial officials, and finally kings of Portugal and emperors of Brazil.

== Early life ==
Historians believe he was born in Veiros, Estremoz, Alentejo, as a natural son of Portuguese King John I and Inês Peres. He married the heiress Beatriz Pereira de Alvim, daughter of Nuno Álvares Pereira, a general and the wealthiest man in the kingdom.

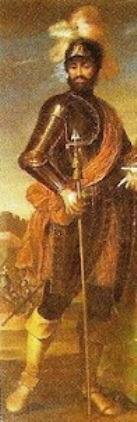
D. Afonso; 18th-century depiction at the Ducal Palace of Vila Viçosa.

A traveled and cultivated man, Afonso was present in 1415 when the Portuguese conquered Ceuta.

== Royal succession ==
When his half-brother, King Duarte I of Portugal, died in 1438, his son Afonso V (Afonso's nephew) was an infant and the choice of regent was his sister-in-law, the Queen Mother Eleonor of Aragon. This choice was not popular because Eleonor was Aragonese. Among the aristocracy, however — especially Afonso's inner circle —, Eleonor of Aragon was preferred. There were also doubts about Peter's political ability. At a meeting of the Portuguese Cortes summoned by Afonso's half-brother John, Lord of Reguengos de Monsaraz, the regency was awarded to the Infante Peter, Duke of Coimbra, another half-brother of Afonso and an uncle of the young king. This choice pleased both the people and the fast-growing bourgeoisie.

In 1443, in a gesture of reconciliation, Peter made Afonso the first Duke of Braganza. But, in 1445, Afonso took offence because Isabella of Coimbra, Peter's daughter, became the choice for Afonso V's wife, and not one of his granddaughters. Indifferent to the intrigues, Peter continued his regency and the country prospered under his rule. It was during this period that the first subsidies for the exploration of the Atlantic Ocean were appropriated under the supervision of Henry the Navigator (another of Afonso's half-brothers).

On 9 June 1448, King Afonso V came of age, and Peter turned over control of the country to the king. An ambitious man, Afonso persuaded his nephew, the young king, to turn against Peter. Influenced by Afonso, the king nullified all of Peter's edicts.

The following year, under accusations that years later would prove false, Afonso V declared his uncle Peter a rebel. The situation became unsustainable and a civil war began. On 20 May 1449, during the Battle of Alfarrobeira, near Alverca, Peter was killed.

After the Battle of Alfarrobeira, Afonso V gave new powers to his uncle Afonso and nine years later when he departed for Africa, the regency was delegated to him.

== Marriages and issue ==
Afonso married twice. His first marriage was to Beatriz Pereira de Alvim, on 8 November 1400, with whom he had three children:

Name	Birth	Death	Notes
Afonso	1401	9 October 1460	4th Count of Ourém, 1st Marquis of Valença
Isabella	October 1402	26 October 1466	Married John, Lord of Reguengos de Monsaraz
Fernando I	1403	1 April 1478	9th Count of Barcelos, 5th Count of Ourém, 3rd Count of Arraiolos, 2nd Duke of Braganza, 1st Marquis of Vila Viçosa, 1st Count of Neiva

Afonso married a second time, to his first cousin once removed, Constance of Noronha, daughter of Alfonso Enríquez, Count of Gijón and Noreña (a natural son of Henry II of Castile), and of Isabel of Portugal (a natural daughter of Fernando I of Portugal). They had no issue.

== Ancestry ==
Ancestors of Afonso I, Duke of Braganza

8. Afonso IV of Portugal
4. Peter I of Portugal
9. Beatrice of Castile
2. John I of Portugal
10. Lourenço Martins
5. Teresa Lourenço
11. Sancha Martins
1. Afonso I, Duke of Braganza
12. Estevão Peres
6. Pero Esteves, o Barbadão
13. Leonor Anes
3. Inês Pires
14. Joane Anes Marceiro
7. Maria Anes
15. Constança Garcês

== See also ==
- Duke of Braganza
- List of dukes of Braganza

== Notes ==
Afonso I, Duke of Braganza House of Braganza Cadet branch of the House of Aviz Born: 10 August 1377 Died: 15 December 1461
Portuguese nobility
Preceded by Nuno Álvares Pereira	Count of Barcelos; 1401–1461	Succeeded by Fernando I
New title	Duke of Braganza; 1442–1461	Succeeded by Fernando I
