= Teresa Lourenço =

Mistress of Peter I of Portugal (1330–?)

- Born: 1330; Lisbon, Kingdom of Portugal
- Died: Unknown
- Issue: John I of Portugal
- Father: Lourenço
- Mother: Sancha Martins

Teresa Lourenço (Lisbon, 1330 – ?), was the lover of King Peter I of Portugal and mother of King John I of Portugal.

== Life ==
According to Fernão Lopes, a 15th-century Portuguese chronicler, she was a noble called Dona Tareija Lourenço from the Kingdom of Galicia, but later it was established, first in the eighteenth century by António Caetano de Sousa who found a document in the Arquivo Nacional da Torre do Tombo, that she was a common woman from Lisbon.

Her parents were Lourenço and Sancha Martins, who were merchants.

She had a love affair with King Peter I of Portugal after the assassination of Inês de Castro. She became pregnant and gave birth to a son John. King Peter confided the boy to Teresa's father Lourenço, to give the boy a good education and raise him to be a knight. In 1364, John was created Grand Master of the Order of Aviz. He even became King of Portugal (r. 1385–1433), after the 1383–1385 Crisis.

After the birth of John, nothing further is known about Teresa. Through John, Teresa is the ancestor of an impressive list of royals, who include Charles the Bold, Isabella I of Castile, Maximilian I, Holy Roman Emperor, Henry the Navigator and Charles V, Holy Roman Emperor.
