= John I of Portugal =

King of Portugal from 1385 to 1433

John I
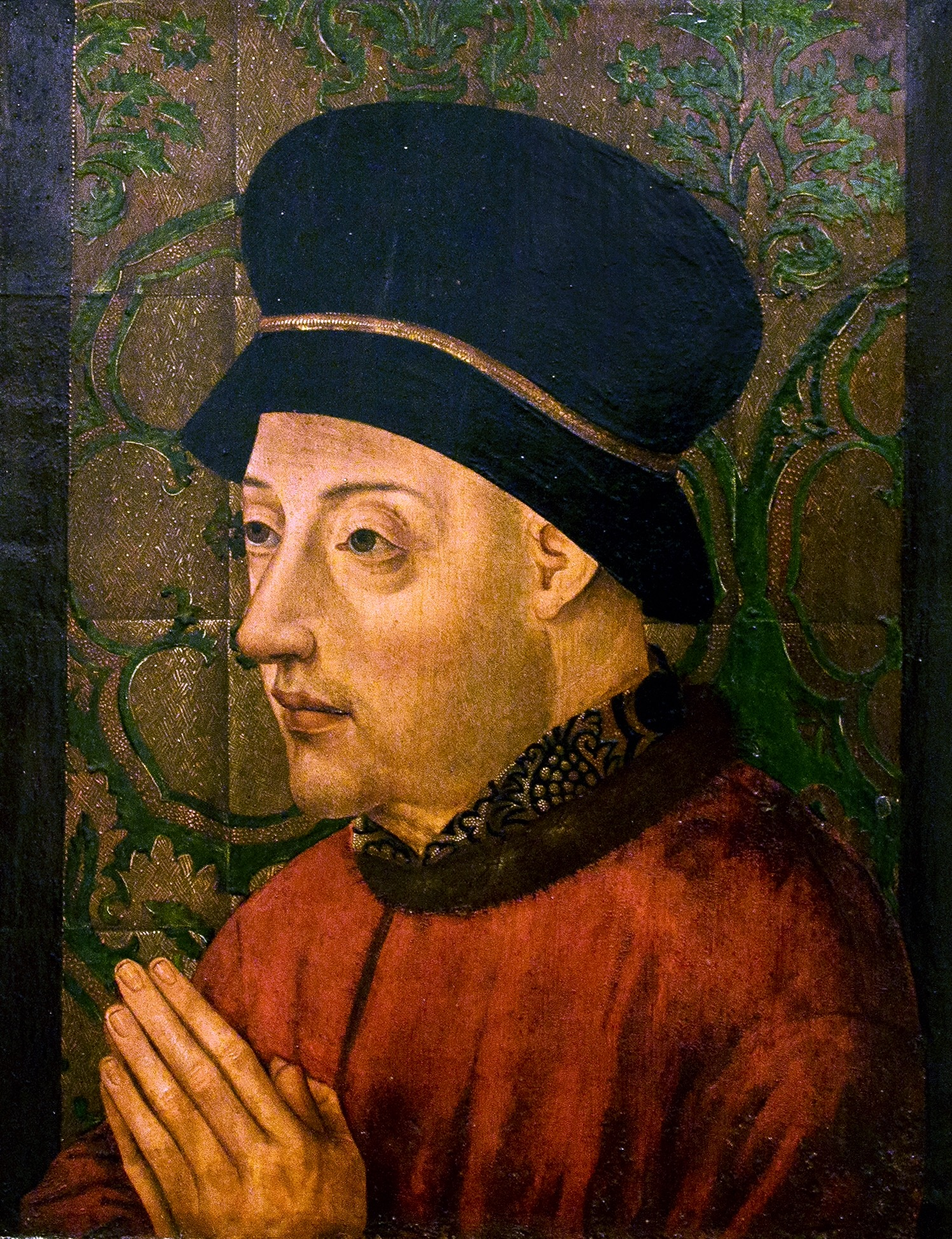
- Portrait, c. 1435

King of Portugal
- Reign: 6 April 1385 – 14 August 1433
- Acclamation: 6 April 1385
- Predecessor: Beatrice (disputed) or Ferdinand I
- Successor: Edward
- Born: 11 April 1357; Lisbon, Portugal
- Died: 14 August 1433 (aged 76); Lisbon, Portugal
- Burial: Batalha Monastery
- Spouse: Philippa of Lancaster (m. 1387; died 1415)
- Issue among others...: Branca of Portugal; Afonso, Heir Presumptive; Edward, King of Portugal; Peter, Duke of Coimbra; Henry, Duke of Viseu; Isabella, Duchess of Burgundy; John, Constable of Portugal; Ferdinand, Master of Aviz; Illegitimate: Afonso I, Duke of Braganza; Beatrice, Countess of Arundel
- House: Aviz
- Father: Peter I of Portugal
- Mother: Teresa Lourenço

John I (Portuguese: João [ʒuˈɐ̃w̃]; 11 April 1357 – 14 August 1433), also called John of Aviz, was King of Portugal from 1385 until his death in 1433. He is recognized chiefly for his role in Portugal's victory in a succession war with Castile, preserving his country's independence and establishing the Aviz (or Joanine) dynasty on the Portuguese throne. His long reign of 48 years, the most extensive of all Portuguese monarchs, saw the beginning of Portugal's overseas expansion. John's well-remembered reign in his country earned him the epithet of Fond Memory (de Boa Memória).

== Early life ==
John was born in Lisbon as the natural son of King Peter I of Portugal by a woman named Teresa, who, according to the royal chronicler Fernão Lopes in the Chronicle of the King D. Pedro I, was a noble Galician. In the 18th century, António Caetano de Sousa found a 16th-century document in the archives of the Torre do Tombo in which she was named as Teresa Lourenço.

John was raised and educated by Nuno Freire de Andrade, a Galician Grand Master of the Order of Christ. In January 1364, at Chamusca, Nuno presented John to Peter I for the first time and secured John's appointment as Grand Master of the Order of Aviz.

When John's half-brother Ferdinand I died in October 1383 without a male heir, strenuous efforts were made to secure the succession for Beatrice, Ferdinand's only daughter and heir presumptive. Beatrice had married King John I of Castile, but popular sentiment was against an arrangement in which Portugal would have been virtually annexed by Castile. The 1383–1385 Portuguese interregnum followed, a period of political anarchy, when no monarch ruled the country.

== Acclamation ==
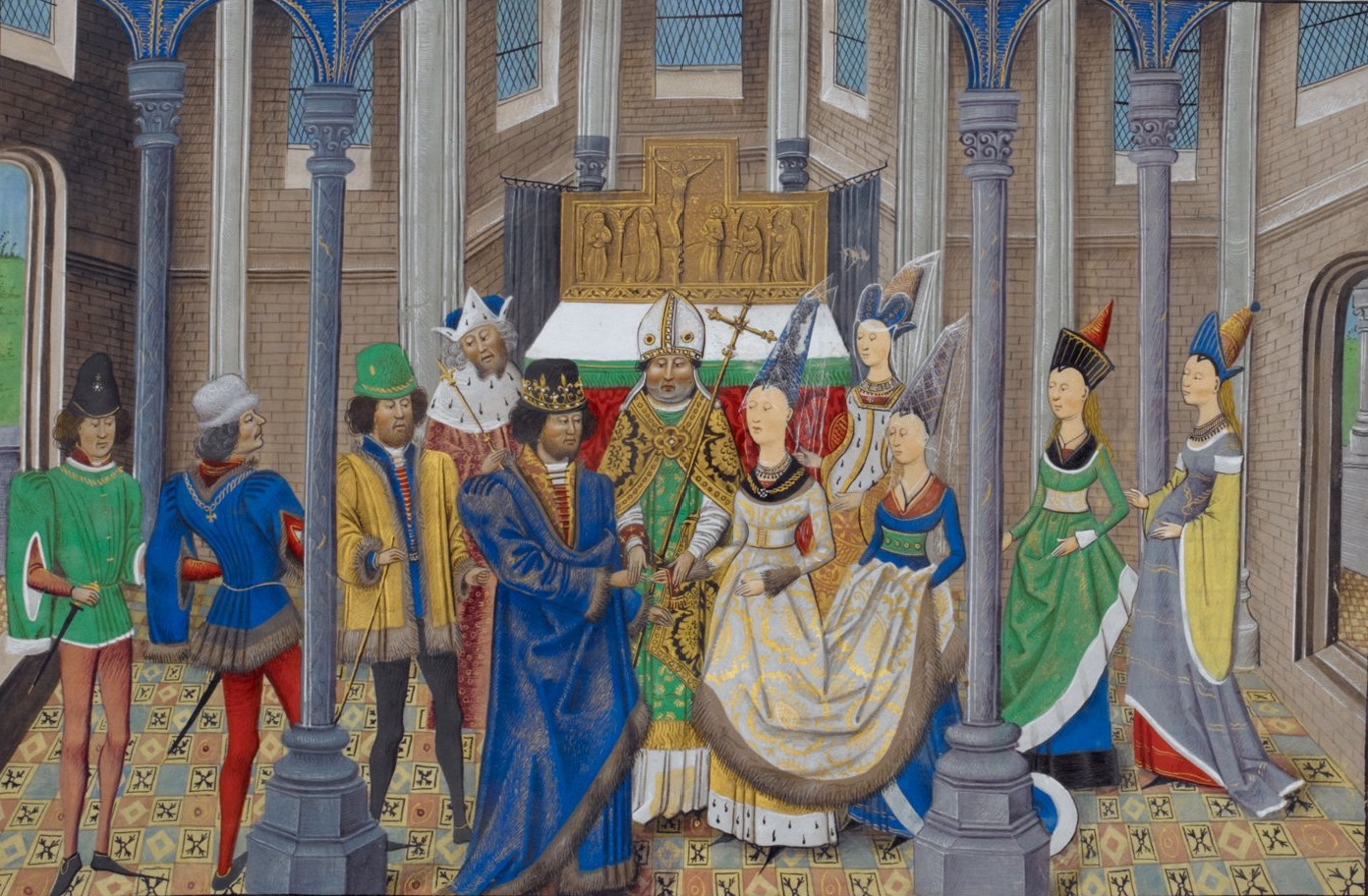
The wedding of João I of Portugal, 2 February 1387 with Philippa of Lancaster, by 15th-century painter and manuscript illuminator Master of Wavrin, from around Lille, now in France

On 6 April 1385, the Council of the Kingdom (the Portuguese Cortes) met in Coimbra and declared John, then Master of Aviz, to be king of Portugal. This was followed by the liberation of almost all of the Minho in the course of two months as part of a war against Castile in opposition to its claims to the Portuguese throne. Soon after, the king of Castile again invaded Portugal with the purpose of conquering Lisbon and removing John I from the throne. John I of Castile was accompanied by French allied cavalry while English troops and generals took the side of John of Aviz (see Hundred Years' War). John and Nuno Álvares Pereira, his constable and talented supporter, repelled the attack in the decisive Battle of Aljubarrota on 14 August 1385. John I of Castile then retreated. The Castilian forces abandoned Santarém, Torres Vedras and Torres Novas, and many other towns were delivered to John I by Portuguese nobles from the Castilian side. As a result, the stability of the Portuguese throne was permanently secured.

On 2 February 1387, John I married Philippa of Lancaster, daughter of John of Gaunt, who had proved to be a worthy ally. The marriage consolidated an Anglo-Portuguese Alliance that endures to the present day.

== Reign ==
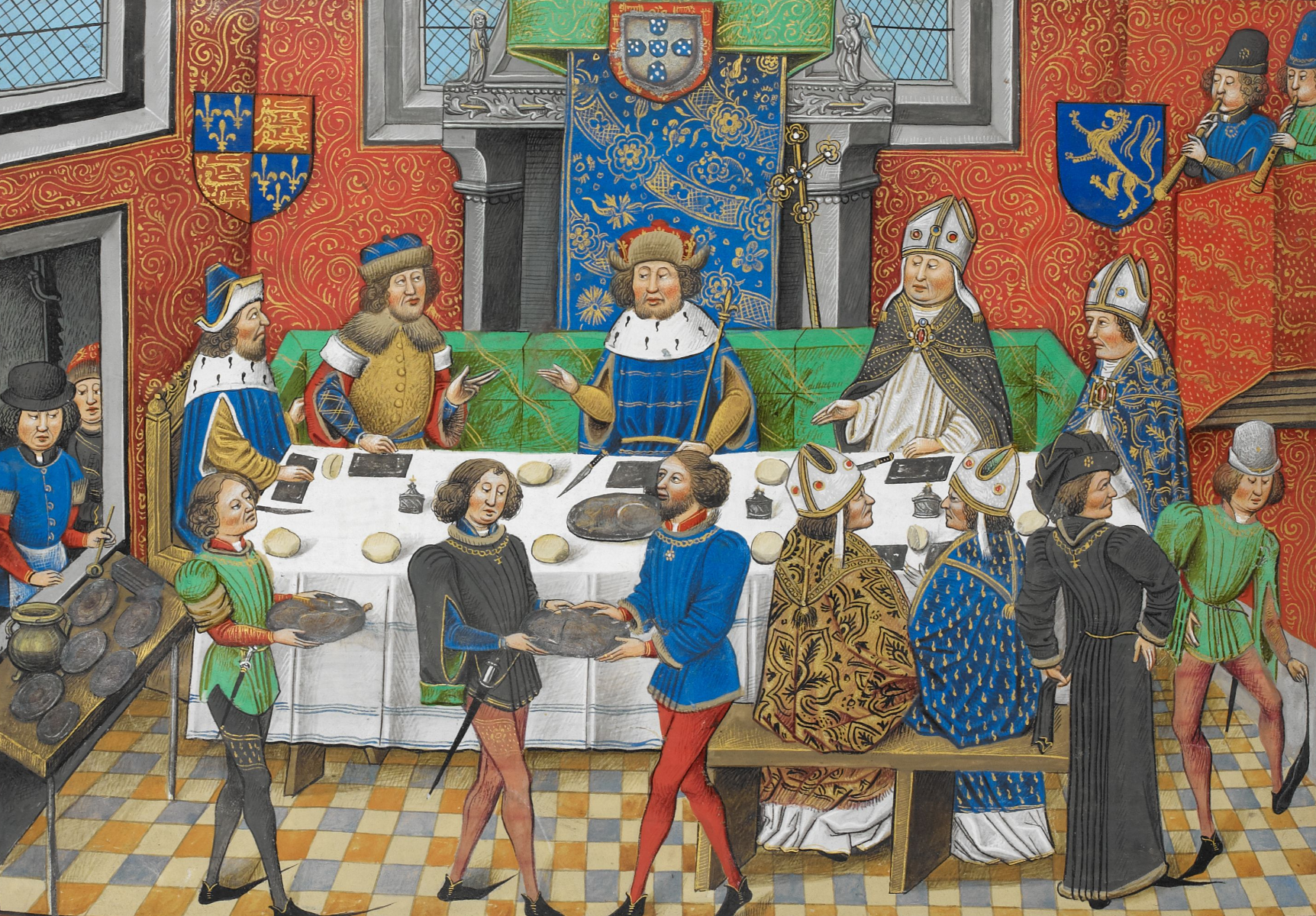
John I of Portugal (center of table) dines with John of Gaunt (left side of table) during negotiations for the latter's invasion of Castile to enforce his claim as King. The negotiations resulted in the Treaty of Windsor which confirmed the Anglo-Portuguese Alliance and resulted in the marriage of the Portuguese King to John of Gaunt's daughter, Philippa of Lancaster.

John I of Castile died in 1390 without issue from his wife Beatrice, which meant that a competing legitimate bloodline with a claim to the throne of Portugal died out. John I of Portugal was then able to rule in peace and concentrate on the economic development and territorial expansion of his realm. The most significant military actions were the siege and conquest of the city of Ceuta by Portugal in 1415, and the successful defence of Ceuta from a Moroccan counterattack in 1419. These measure were intended to help seize control of navigation off the African coast and trade routes from the interior of Africa.

The raids and attacks of the Reconquista in the Iberian Peninsula created captives on both sides who were either ransomed or sold as slaves. The Portuguese crown extended this practice to North Africa. After the attack on Ceuta, the king sought papal recognition of the military action as a Crusade. Such a ruling would have enabled those captured to be legitimately sold as slaves. In response to John's request, Pope Martin V issued the Papal bull Sane charissimus of 4 April 1418, which confirmed to the king all of the lands he might win from the Moors. Under the auspices of Prince Henry the Navigator, voyages were organized to explore the African coast. These led to the discovery of the uninhabited islands of Madeira in 1417 and the Azores in 1427; all were claimed by the Portuguese crown.

Contemporaneous writers describe John as a man of wit who was very keen on concentrating power on himself, but at the same time possessed a benevolent and kind demeanor. His youthful education as master of a religious order made him an unusually learned king for the Middle Ages. His love for knowledge and culture was passed on to his sons, who are often referred to collectively by Portuguese historians as the "illustrious generation" (Ínclita Geração): Edward, the future king, was a poet and a writer; Peter, the Duke of Coimbra, was one of the most learned princes of his time; and Prince Henry the Navigator, the duke of Viseu, invested heavily in science and the development of nautical pursuits. In 1430, John's only surviving daughter, Isabella, married Philip the Good, Duke of Burgundy, and enjoyed an extremely refined court culture in his lands; she was the mother of Charles the Bold.

The use of the Hispanic Era, or the Era of Caesar, as a dating method was abolished in Portugal by royal decree of King John I, dated August 22, 1422, and the Christian Era was adopted, with its use spreading throughout the country.

== Marriage and descendants ==
On 2 February 1387, John I married Philippa of Lancaster, daughter of John of Gaunt, 1st Duke of Lancaster, in Porto. From that marriage were born several famous princes and princesses of Portugal (infantes) that became known as the "illustrious generation".

Name	Birth	Death	Notes
By Philippa of Lancaster (31 March 1360 – 19 July 1415; married on 2 February 1387)
Infanta Blanche	13 July 1388	6 March 1389	Died young. Named after her grandmother, Blanche of Lancaster.
Infante Afonso	30 July 1390	22 December 1400	At 10 years old he got ill while travelling to Guimarães and was buried in the Cathedral of Braga.
King Edward	31 October 1391	13 September 1438	Who succeeded him as King of Portugal.
Infante Peter	9 December 1392	20 May 1449	Duke of Coimbra. Died in the Battle of Alfarrobeira.
Infante Henry	4 March 1394	13 November 1460	Known as Henry the Navigator. Duke of Viseu and Grand Master of the Order of Christ.
Infanta Isabella	21 February 1397	11 December 1471	Duchess consort of Burgundy by marriage to Philip III, Duke of Burgundy.
Infante John	13 January 1400	18 October 1442	Constable of the Kingdom and grandfather of Isabella I of Castile.
Infante Ferdinand	29 September 1402	5 June 1443	Grand Master of the Order of Aviz. Died in captivity in Fes, Morocco.
By Inês Pires (c. 1350–1400?)
Afonso	10 August 1377	15 December 1461	Natural son and 1st Duke of Braganza.
Beatrice	c. 1380	November 1439	Natural daughter. Countess of Arundel by marriage to Thomas Fitzalan, 12th Earl of Arundel. Countess of Huntingdon by marriage to John Holland, 2nd Earl of Huntingdon, later Duke of Exeter.

== Ancestry ==
Ancestors of John I of Portugal

8. Denis of Portugal
4. Afonso IV of Portugal
9. Elizabeth of Aragon
2. Peter I of Portugal
10. Sancho IV of Castile
5. Beatrice of Castile
11. María de Molina
1. John I of Portugal
6. Lourenço Martins
3. Teresa Lourenço
7. Sancha Martins

== Notes ==
John I of Portugal House of Aviz Cadet branch of the House of Burgundy Born: 11 April 1357 Died: 14 August 1433
Regnal titles
Vacant Title last held by Ferdinand I	King of Portugal; 1385–1433	Succeeded by Edward
Military offices
Preceded by Martim Martins de Avelar	Grand Master of the Order of Aviz; 1364–1387	Succeeded by Fernando Rodrigues de Siqueira
