= List of people on the postage stamps of Portugal =

This is a list of people who have appeared on the postage stamps of Portugal

== A ==
- Adam, first man, according to the Bible (1998)
- Afonso I, king (1926; 1940; 1947; 1955; 2009)
- Afonso II, king (1955)
- Afonso III, king (1955)
- Afonso IV, king (1955)
- Afonso V, king (1994; 1996)
- Alfonso de Portugal, Grandmaster (2013)
- Joaquim Agostinho, cyclist (2005)
- Agrippina the Elder, Roman matron (1993)
- Albert I, prince of Monaco (1996)
- Matias de Albuquerque, colonial administrator (1928)
- Tomás Alcaide, tenor (2001)
- Woody Allen, American filmmaker, actor and musician (2000)
- Brites de Almeida, heroine of Independence (1927)
- José de Almada Negreiros, painter (Self-Portrait 1993; 2005)
- António José de Almeida, politician (1979)
- Almeida Garrett, poet, playwright, novelist (1957; 1999)
- Nuno Álvares Pereira, general, saint (1926; 1928; 1931; 1933; 1949; 2009)
- Dino Alves , fashion designer (2004)
- Laura Alves, actress (1996)
- Manuel Alves , fashion designer (2004)
- Amélia de Orleães, queen (2005)
- José de Anchieta, missionary (1997)
- Angel of the Annunciation, archangel (1993)
- Carolina Beatriz Ângelo, feminist (2009)
- António de Lisboa, Franciscan saint (1895; 1931; 1933; 1981; 1995)
- António Moreira Antunes, cartoonist (2005)
- José de Azeredo Perdigão, foundation president (1996)

== B ==
- Robert Baden-Powell, British general and founder of scouting (2007)
- Nuno Baltazar , fashion designer (2004)
- João de Barros, historian (1996)
- Bartolomeu dos Mártires, theologian and archbishop (1990)
- Alexander Graham Bell, Scottish inventor (1976)
- Manuel Maria Barbosa du Bocage, poet (1966)
- Miguel Bombarda, psychiatrist and politician (2001)
- João Domingos Bomtempo, composer (1974)
- José Bonifácio, Brazilian statesman (1972)
- Columbano Bordalo Pinheiro, painter (2007)
- Rafael Bordalo Pinheiro, artist, cartoonist (1992; 2005)
- Teófilo Braga, writer and politician (1979)
- Fernando II, Duke of Braganza, nobleman (1965)
- João Carlos de Bragança, nobleman (1980)
- Louis Braille, musician and inventor of braille (2009)
- João Branco , fashion designer (2004)
- João de Brito, missionary and saint (1948)
- Félix Avelar Brotero, botanist (1944)
- Luís Buchinho, fashion designer (2004)

== C ==
- Adelaide Cabete, physician and feminist (2009)
- Pedro Álvares Cabral, explorer (1945; 1969; 1992; 2000)
- Juan Rodríguez Cabrillo, explorer (1969; 1994)
- Luís da Câmara Pestana, bacteriologist (1966; 1999)
- Luís de Camões, poet (1898; 1911; 1924; 1972; 1980)
- Diogo Cão, explorer (1945; 1986; 1991)
- Bento de Jesus Caraça, mathematician (2001)
- Carlos I, king (1892–93; 1895–96; 1996)
- António Óscar Carmona, president (1934; 1945; 1970)
- Stuart Carvalhais, cartoonist (2005)
- Rómulo de Carvalho, poet (2006)
- Camilo Castelo Branco, writer (1925; 1990)
- Álvaro de Castro, politician (1980)
- João de Castro, viceroy of India (1994)
- Ana de Castro Osório, feminist writer (2009)
- João Chagas, journalist and politician (1979)
- Augusto Cid, cartoonist (2005)
- João Cid dos Santos, physician (1999)
- José Eduardo Coelho journalist (1964)
- Christopher Columbus, explorer (1988 - Madeira, 1992)
- José Correia da Serra, naturalist (1966)
- João Vaz Corte-Real, navigator (ship shown on stamp, 1966)
- Jaime Cortesão, historian and politician (1980)
- Pêro da Covilhã, diplomat and explorer (1988)
- Afonso Costa, politician (1979)
- Costa Motta (tio), sculptor (1971)
- Francisco Rodrigues da Cruz, priest, blessed (1960)
- Álvaro Cunhal, politician (2005)
- Marie Curie, Polish physicist and chemist (1998)

== D ==
- Charles Darwin, English naturalist (2009)
- Humberto Delgado, air force general and politician (2006)
- João de Deus, poet (1996)
- Bartolomeu Dias, explorer (1945; 1992)
- Dinis I, king (1955; 1976; 1997)
- Walt Disney, American filmmaker, animator and entrepreneur (2001)
- Afonso Domingues, architect (1949)
- José Domingues dos Santos, politician (1980)
- Martinho de Dume, archbishop and saint (1953)

== E ==
- Gil Eanes, explorer (1945; 1984; 1991)
- Eça de Queiroz, novelist (1995; 2000)
- António Egas Moniz, neurologist (1966; 1974; 1983; 1999)
- Albert Einstein, Swiss physicist (2000; 2005)
- Eleanor, queen (1958; 1985)
- José Elias Garcia, journalist and politician (1979)
- Elizabeth of Portugal, queen and saint (1958)
- Robert Esnault-Pelterie, French spaceflight theorist (1975)
- Florbela Espanca, poet (1994)
- Ricardo Espírito Santo, banker and philanthropist (2003)
- Eusébio, footballer (2005)

== F ==
- Filipe Faísca, fashion designer (2004)
- João Fernandes Andeiro, Galician count (1983)
- Pedro Fernandes de Queiroz, navigator (1994)
- João Fernandes Vieira, colonial liberator and governor (1968)
- Fernando, prince and saint (1949)
- Fernando I, king (1955)
- Fernando II, king of Aragon (1994)
- Fernando II, duke of Braganza (1965)
- Fernando IV, king of Castile (1997)
- Joaquim Ferreira dos Santos, merchant and philanthropist (1993)
- José Maria Ferreira de Castro, writer (1998)
- António Joaquim Ferreira da Silva (1853-1923), chemist (1956)
- Fialho de Almeida, writer (2007)
- Filipa de Lencastre, queen (1949)
- Francis of Assisi, Italian monk and saint (1982; 2009)
- Francisco Xavier, missionary (1952; 2006)
- Francisco Franco de Sousa, sculptor (1971)
- Luís Fróis, missionary (1997)

== G ==
- Gabriel, archangel (1962; 1993)
- Carlos Viegas Gago Coutinho, aviator pioneer (1923; 1969; 1972)
- Vasco da Gama, explorer (1898; 1911; 1945; 1969; 1980; 1992; 1996; 1997; 1998)
- Ruy Roque Gameiro, sculptor (1971)
- Francisco Gentil, oncologist (1999)
- Robert H. Goddard, American rocket scientist (1975)
- Bento de Góis, missionary, explorer (1968)
- Damião de Góis, philosopher (1974; 2002)
- Guilherme Gomes Fernandes (1850-1902), firefighter (1953)
- Diogo Gomes, explorer (1991)
- Estêvão Gomes, cartographer and explorer (1993)
- Francisco Gomes Teixeira, mathematician (1952)
- José Manuel Gonçalves, fashion designer (2004)
- Nuno Gonçalves de Faria, patriot (1973)
- Joana de Gouveia, heroine of Independence (1928)
- Guerra Junqueiro, poet (1951)
- Guiomar de Sá Vilhena, landowner (1996 - Madeira)
- Calouste Gulbenkian, Armenian oil pioneer, philanthropist, art collector (1965; 2006)
- Bartolomeu de Gusmão, inventor (1983)

== H ==
- Paul Harris, American founder of Rotary Clubs (2005)
- Henrique, o Navegador, prince, patron of exploration (1894; 1935; 1949; 1960; 1994)
- Henrique de Borgonha, count of Portugal (1996)
- Alexandre Herculano, novelist and historian (1977)
- Celso Hermínio, cartoonist (2005)
- Augusto Hilário, singer (1996)
- Rowland Hill, English postal reformer (1940; 1990)
- Pedro Homem de Melo, poet (2004)

== I ==
- Innocent III, pope (2009)
- Isabel, queen of Portugal and saint (1958)
- Isabel de Portugal, Duchess of Burgundy (1991)
- Roberto Ivens, explorer and colonial administrator (1998)

== J ==
- James the Greater, apostle and patron saint of Spain (1984)
- Jesus, central figure of Christianity (1974; 1977; 1979; 1981; 1983; 1995; 2000)
- Joana, princess and blessed, called saint in Portugal (1953)
- João I, king (1926; 1983; 1949; 2004; 2007)
- João II, king (1981; 1992; 1994)
- João IV, king (1926; 1940; 1995; 2004)
- João VI, king (2008)
- João de Deus, saint (1950; 1995)
- John XXI, pope (1977)
- John Paul II, pope (1982; 2000)
- Ricardo Jorge, hygienist (1966; 1999; 2008)
- José I, king (1969; 1995)
- Joseph, saint, husband of Mary (1974; 1977; 1979; 1981; 1983)

== K ==
- Alfredo Keil, composer and painter (1990)
- Robert Koch, German physician (1982)

== L ==
- Leal da Câmara, painter and cartoonist (2005)
- José Leite de Vasconcelos, ethnographer (1966)
- Maximiano Lemos, medical historian (1966)
- José Leitão de Barros, film director (1996)
- Leonor de Avis, queen (1958; 1985)
- João de Lisboa, navigator (1993)
- Duarte Lobo, composer (1974)
- Carlos Lopes, long-distance runner and footballer (2005)
- Fátima Lopes, fashion designer (2004)
- Fernão Lopes, chronicler (1949; 1995)
- Henrique Lopes de Mendonça, poet and playwright (1990)
- Pero Lopes de Sousa, navigator (1994)
- Fernando Lopes-Graça, composer (2006)
- António Lopes Ribeiro, film director (1996)
- Ilse Losa, novelist (2013)
- Luís I, king (1862–64; 1866–67; 1867–70; 1870–76; 1879–90; 1880–81; 1882–83; 1884–87; 1884; 1892–1893; 1980; 1989; 2002)

== M ==
- Bernardino Machado, president (2001)
- Fernão de Magalhães, explorer (1945; 1993)
- Sebastião de Magalhães Lima, journalist and statesman (1978)
- Ferdinand Magellan, explorer (1945; 1993)
- José Malhoa, painter (2005)
- Manuel I, king (1995; 1996)
- Manuel II, king (1910)
- João Abel Manta, cartoonist (2005)
- Guglielmo Marconi, Italian inventor (2000)
- Maria I, queen (1997)
- Maria II, queen (1853; 1935; 1953; 2003)
- Mark the Evangelist, apostle (1993)
- Bernardo Marques, painter (painting shown 1998)
- Martinho de Dume, archbishop and saint (1953)
- Osvaldo Martins, fashion designer (2004)
- Jaime Martins Barata, painter (1999)
- Jacinta and Francisco Marto, siblings who saw visions of Mary (1992; 2000)
- Mary, saint, mother of Jesus (1946; 1950; 1956; 1967; 1974; 1977; 1979; 1981; 1983; 1993; 2000)
- Fernão Mendes Pinto, explorer (1980)
- Emílio Garrastazu Médici, Brazilian president (1973)
- Thomaz de Mello, graphic artist (2006)
- Gonçalo Mendes da Maia, knight, military commander (1927)
- Michael, archangel (1993)
- Carolina Michaëlis, philologist (2001; 2009)
- Aureliano de Mira Fernandes, mathematician (2008)
- Jean Monnet, French statesman (1988)
- Gil Montalverne de Sequeira, politician, promoter of autonomy for the Azores (1995 - Azores)
- Aristides Moreira da Mota, politician, promoter of autonomy for the Azores (1995 - Azores)
- Alexandra Moura, fashion designer (2004)
- Wolfgang Amadeus Mozart, Austrian composer (1993; 2006)

== N ==
- Natália Correia, poet (1996 - Azores)
- Vitorino Nemésio, poet (1999 - Azores, 2001)
- António Nicolau de Almeida, football (soccer) enthusiast (2005)
- Manuel da Nóbrega, missionary (1954)
- José Norton de Matos, politician (1980; 1999)
- João da Nova, Galician explorer (1992)
- Pedro Nunes, mathematician and geographer (1978; 2002)

== O ==
- Hermann Oberth, Romanian rocket scientist (1975)
- Manoel de Oliveira, film director (2008)
- Joaquim Pedro de Oliveira Martins, historian and politician (1994)
- Our Lady of Fátima (1950; 1967)
- Our Lady of the Conception (1946; 1997)

== P ==
- Duarte Pacheco Pereira, explorer and cartographer (1993)
- Gualdim Pais, crusader, knight (1928)
- Passos Manuel, politician (1986)
- Vincent de Paul, French saint (1963)
- Aurélio Paz dos Reis, cinema pioneer (1996)
- Pedro I, king (1955)
- Pedro IV, king, also emperor of Brazil as Pedro I (1972; 1984)
- Pedro V, king (1855–56; 1856–58; 1961; 2002)
- António Pedro, painter, writer, actor (2009)
- António Xavier Pereira Coutinho, botanist (1966)
- Soeiro Pereira Gomes, writer (2009)
- Bartolomeu Perestrelo, explorer (1990)
- Fernando Pessoa, poet (1975; 1985; 2000)
- Raul Maria Pereira , architect (2007)
- Philip the Good, Duke of Burgundy (1991)
- Philippa of Lancaster, queen (1949)
- João Pinto Ribeiro, conspirator (1927)
- Manuel Pinto da Fonseca, Grandmaster (2013)
- Pius XII, pope (1951)
- Marquis of Pombal, statesman (1972; 1982; 1999)
- Marcos Portugal, composer (1974)
- Henrique Pousão, painter (2009)

== Q ==
- Virgínia Quaresma, (1882-1973), journalist (2009)
- Antero de Quental, poet (1991)

== R ==
- João das Regras, jurist (1927; 1949)
- José Régio, writer (2001)
- Pedro Reinel, cartographer (1985)
- José Relvas, politician (2008)
- Aquilino Ribeiro, novelist (1985)
- Pilar Ribeiro, mathematician (2011)
- João Baptista Ribeiro, painter and engraver (1986)
- João Rodrigues Cabrilho, explorer (1969; 1994)
- José Rodrigues Miguéis, writer (2001)
- Gioachino Rossini, Italian composer (1993)

== S ==
- Francisco Sá Carneiro, political leader (1990)
- Sacadura Cabral, aviator (1923; 1972)
- Ana Salazar, fashion designer (2004)
- António de Oliveira Salazar, prime minister, dictator (1971)
- Samuel Azavey Torres de Carvalho (known as "Sam"), cartoonist (his character Guarda Ricardo shown, 2005)
- José Saramago, novelist (1998)
- Luís Sanchez , fashion designer (2004)
- Sancho I, king (1955)
- Sancho II, king (1955)
- Sebastião Sanhudo, cartoonist (2005)
- Francisco dos Santos (sculptor), sculptor (1971)
- Lúcia Santos, nun who saw visions of Mary (1992)
- Reinaldo dos Santos, physician and art historian (1999)
- Vasco Santana actor (1996)
- Sebastião I, king (1990)
- Carlos Seixas, composer (1974)
- António Sérgio, thinker and educator (1980)
- Alexandre de Serpa Pinto, explorer and colonial administrator (1980)
- José António Serrano (1851-1904), surgeon, anatomist (1966)
- Alfredo da Silva, industrialist (2008)
- António Silva, film actor (1996)
- Agostinho da Silva, philosopher (2006)
- Eusébio da Silva Ferreira, footballer (2005)
- Manuel da Silva Passos, politician (1986)
- Diogo de Silves, explorer (1990)
- José Simões de Almeida (sobrinho) (1880-1950), sculptor (1971)
- Tomé de Sousa, governor-general of Brazil (1972)
- João de Sousa Carvalho, composer (1974)
- Emília de Sousa Costa (1877-1959), feminist, women's education advocate and author (2009)
- Aristides de Sousa Mendes, diplomat (1995)
- Amadeo de Souza Cardoso, painter (1987)
- Heinrich von Stephan, German postmaster general (1999)

== T ==
- Manuel Teixeira Gomes, politician and writer (1980)
- António Teixeira Lopes, sculptor (1971)
- José António Tenente , fashion designer (2004)
- Teotónio, saint (1958)
- Teresa de Leão, countess of Portugal (1996)
- Luísa Todi, mezzo-soprano (1974)
- Miguel Torga, writer (2007)
- Nuno Tristão, explorer (1991)
- Konstantin Tsiolkovsky, Russian rocket scientist (1975)

== V ==
- Francisco Valença (1882-1962), illustrator and cartoonist (2005)
- Luís Mendes de Vasconcellos, colonial governor and Grandmaster (2013)
- Tristão Vaz Teixeira, explorer (1990)
- Maria Veleda (1871-1955), feminist (2009)
- Gonçalo Velho, explorer (1945, 1989 - Azores)
- Cesário Verde, poet (1957)
- Giuseppe Verdi, Italian composer (1993)
- José Vianna da Motta, composer (1969)
- Gil Vicente, playwright (1937)
- Angelina Vidal, feminist writer (2009)
- António Vieira, missionary, writer and orator (1997; 2008)
- Maria Helena Vieira da Silva, painter (1996; 2008)
- Filipa de Vilhena, patriot (1926)
- António Manoel de Vilhena, Grandmaster (2013)
- Luiz Villas-Boas, jazz musician (2009)
- Vímara Peres, count of Portugal (1995)
- Vincent of Saragossa, patron saint of Lisbon (1995)
- Virgin of the Annuciation (1993)

== W ==
- Richard Wagner, German composer (1993)

== Z ==
- João Gonçalves Zarco, explorer (1945; 1968; 1981; 1990)
- Zeno, saint (1962)
