= Guivarc'h =

- Pronunciation: pronounced [ɡɥivarx] [ɡivaʁ] French pronunciation: [ɡivaʁk], [ɡivaʁ] and erroneously [ɡivarʃ]

Origin
- Origin: Breton
- Meaning: worthy of a good horse, well-horsed (cf. wiw-farch).
- Region of origin: Brittany

Other names
- Variant forms: Guivarch, Guimarch, Guiomarch, Guyomarch, Guyomarc'h, Guyomard, Guyomart, Guiomard, Guionvarch, Guyonvarch, Guianvarch, Guyonvarc'h, Guiavarc'h

Guivarc'h or Guivarch is a surname. It derives from uuiu (cf. gwiw) which means worthy in Old Breton and marc'h (cf. marc'h) which means horse in Breton.

Individuals with the surname include:

- Céline Guivarc'h, French climate scientist
- Stéphane Guivarc'h, French footballer
- Théo Guivarch, French footballer

== See also ==
- Guiomar
- Guimard (disambiguation)
- Wymer
