= Guiomar =

Guiomar is both a name and a surname. It may have been originated from the fictional character Guiomar, which is found in the Arthurian legends. Notable people with the name include:

== Given name ==
- Giomar Guevara (born 1972), Venezuelan baseball player
- Guiomar Novaes (1895–1979), Brazilian pianist
- Guiomar Madalena de Sá e Vilhena (1705–1789), Portuguese businessperson from Madeira

== Nickname ==
- Pilar de Valderrama (1889–1979), Spanish poet and playwright, nicknamed Guiomar by poet Antonio Machado

== Surname ==
- Ana Guiomar (born 1988), Portuguese actress
- Johan Nilsson Guiomar (born 1985), Swedish footballer
- Julien Guiomar (1928–2010), French actor
- Maria Guiomar (1664 – 1728), Siamese cook
- Michel Guiomar (1921–2013), French writer and philosopher
