= Reynaldo dos Santos =

Portuguese physician and historian

Reynaldo dos Santos GCSE
- Born: 3 December 1880; Vila Franca de Xira, Lisbon, Portugal
- Died: 6 May 1970 (aged 89); Lisbon, Portugal
- Occupations: Physician, art historian

Reynaldo dos Santos GCSE (3 December 1880 – 6 May 1970) was a Portuguese physician, writer, and art historian. As a physician, he was a pioneer in the fields of vascular surgery and urology; as an art historian, he published numerous works on 15th-century Portuguese art, including on the Manueline style and on the paintings of Nuno Gonçalves.

== Biography ==
Reynaldo dos Santos was born in 1880 to Clemente José dos Santos (himself a physician) and Maria Amélia Pinheiro Santos, in the family home in Rua das Varinas, Vila Franca de Xira, a town in the outskirts of Lisbon. He concluded his primary and secondary studies in this town, before enrolling at the Medico-Surgical School in Lisbon, from which he graduated in 1903. Between 1902 and 1905, he was abroad in Paris and the main surgical centres of the United States, in Boston, Chicago, Rochester, Baltimore, Philadelphia, and New York.

He earned his doctorate in Medicine in 1906, with his thesis titled "Aspectos Cirúrgicos das Pancreatites Crónicas" ("Surgical Aspects of Chronic Pancreatitis"), after which he started teaching. He married Susana Cid on 18 August of that year. From 1910 to 1916, he taught Clinical Surgery, Surgical Propedeutics, and Operatory Medicine. In 1910, he oversaw a free course of Urology in Desterro Hospital, where he presented urorhythmography, using a device of his own making to "graphically register the value and rhythm of renal excretion as well as the function of the ureters".

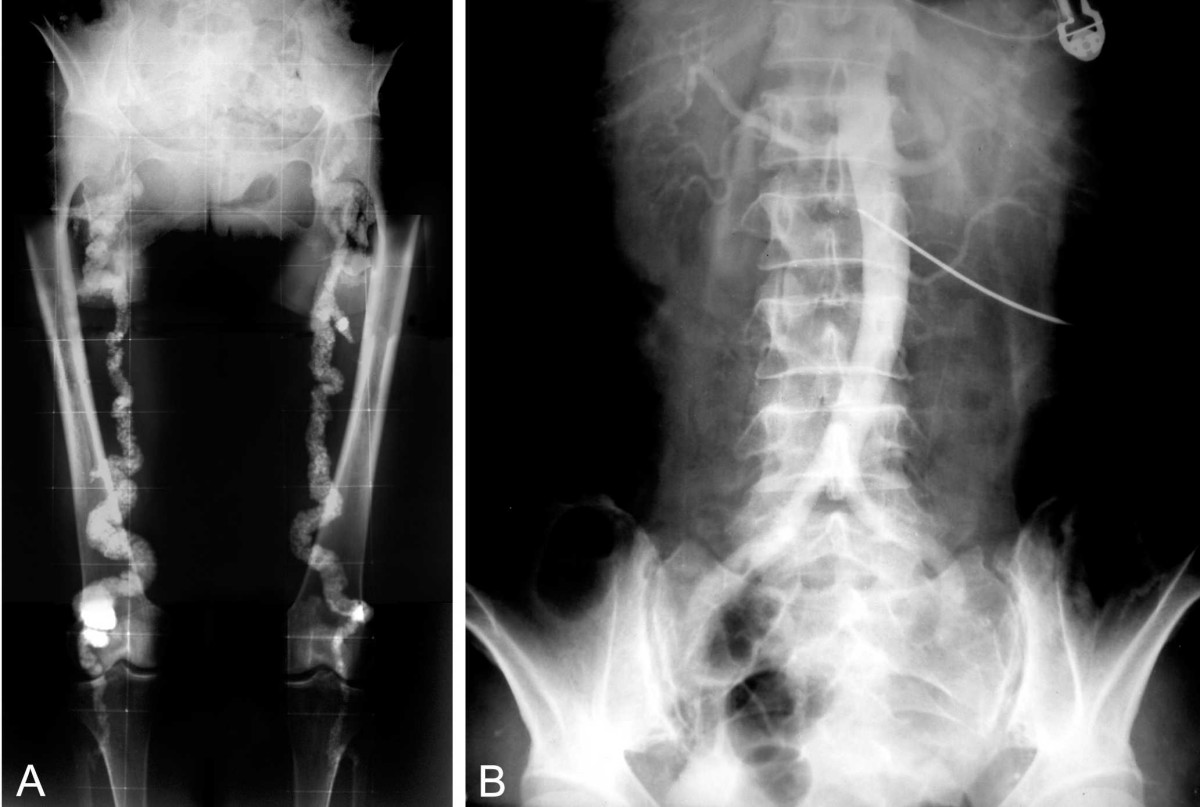
Reynaldo dos Santos developed the aortography (pictured) in 1929

During the First World War, he was sent by the Portuguese Government to aid the Allied army, becoming a member of the Inter-Allied Surgical Conference and acting as a surgeon in the British hospitals in the north of France and, later, as a surgical consultant for the Portuguese Expeditionary Corps.

Once back in Portugal, he was suspended from his teaching position after expressing his profound disagreement with the way medical teaching and hospital care was organised. He created a research and teaching centre in Arroios Hospital, and became this hospital's Head of General Surgery in 1925. For more than two decades, and building up on the work of António Egas Moniz (who first developed the technique for cerebral angiography in 1927), he developed several studies on angiography of abdominal organs: he performed the first aortography in Lisbon in 1929. In 1930, he became a full professor of Urology and, in 1941, of Surgical Pathology and Therapeutics; the following year, he became Dean of the Faculty of Medicine of the University of Lisbon. He was also a full professor of Surgical Clinic from 1948 to 1950, the year he retired from teaching. He was elected President of the Lisbon Society of Medical Sciences from 1930 to 1932.

Reynaldo dos Santos was the President of the Lisbon Academy of Sciences from 1961 to 1963.

=== Art history ===
Reynaldo dos Santos was equally as accomplished and recognised for his avocation in the Fine Arts; the interest in the history of art was born while he was still a student holidaying in Figueira da Foz: he became interested in the archeological campaigns promoted by António Santos Rocha, and Rocha recommended he read the works of Hippolyte Taine.

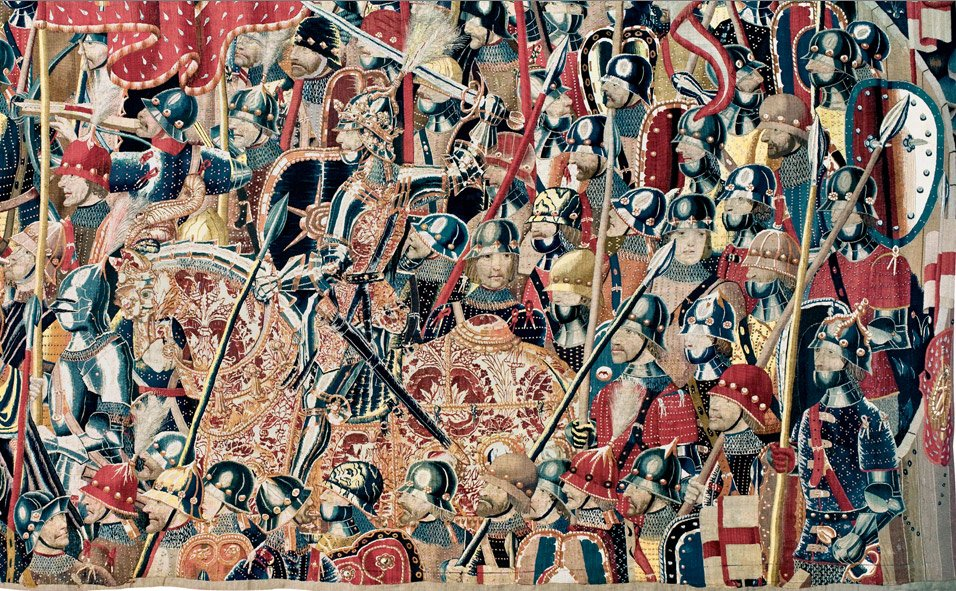
Detail from the Pastrana Tapestries

In 1915, Reynaldo dos Santos, along with José de Figueiredo, discovered a set of tapestries depicting the Portuguese conquest of the Moroccan cities of Asilah and Tangiers in 1471 in the small town of Pastrana, in Spain. This important found was the subject of a monograph, published 1925.

In 1922, he studied the work of Álvaro Pires de Évora, a medieval Portuguese artist active in Tuscany, Italy. He also wrote at length on the work of 15th-century Portuguese court painter Nuno Gonçalves, specifically his Saint Vincent Panels.

In the field of architecture, he authored several works about the country's cathedrals, churches, and hermitages. His main interests include the Manueline style — in 1922, he identified Francisco de Arruda as the architect of the iconic Belém Tower.

He was well-respected in his historic research, and was a member of several national and international academies; notably, he was one of the founders of the Portuguese Academy of History in the 1930s, and President of the National Academy of Fine Arts from 1964 to 1967. He was a director of the arts and letters magazine Colóquio, Revista de Artes e Letras between January 1959 and his death.

== Works ==
- Álvaro Pires de Évora, Pintor Quatrocentista em Itália (Lisboa, 1922)
- A Torre de Belém, 1514–1520 (Coimbra, 1922)
- As Tapeçarias de Arzila e Tânger (Lisboa, 1925)
- Sequeira e Goya (Madrid, 1929)
- A Arquitectura em Portugal (Lisboa, 1929)
- O Mosteiro de Belém (Jerónimos) (Porto, 1930)
- Les Manuscripts enluminés en Portugal (Paris, 1932)
- O Políptico da Madre de Deus de Quintino de Metsys (Lisboa, 1938)
- L'Art Portugais: architecture, sculpture, peinture (Paris, 1938; Lisboa/Porto, 1949)
- Os Primitivos Portugueses (1940; 3.ª ed. corrigida e aumentada 1958)
- O Espírito e a Essência da Arte em Portugal / A Pintura Portuguesa no Século XVII / Sequeira e Goya (Lisboa, 1943)
- A Evolução e o Sentido Cultural da Arte Portuguesa (Lisboa, 1946)
- A Escultura em Portugal (1948–1950)
- O Estilo Manuelino (Lisboa, 1952)
- História de Arte em Portugal, vol. III — O Barroco (Séculos XVII e XVIII) (Porto, 1953)
- O Romântico em Portugal (Lisboa, 1955)
- Nuno Gonçalves, pintor português do século quinze e o seu retábulo para o mosteiro de S. Vicente-de-Fora (Londres, 1955)
- O Azulejo em Portugal (Lisboa, 1957)
- Ourivesaria Portuguesa nas Colecções Particulares, with Irene Quilhó dos Santos (Lisboa, 1959–1960)
- História del arte portugués (Barcelona, 1960)
- Faiança Portuguesa, Séc. XVI e XVII (1960)
- Lo románico en Portugal (Madrid, 1961)
- As Artes Plásticas no Brasil: Antecedentes Portugueses e Exóticos (Rio de Janeiro, 1968)
- Oito Séculos de Arte Portuguesa: História e Espírito, com Irene Quilhó dos Santos (Lisboa, 196?–1970)

== Distinctions ==
=== National orders ===
- Grand Cross of the Order of Saint James of the Sword (7 March 1940)
  - Commander of the Order of Saint James of the Sword (28 June 1919)
- Distinguished Service Medal, Gold (1919)

=== Foreign orders ===
- Distinguished Service Order (United Kingdom, 1919)
- Commander of the Legion of Honour (France, 1955)
  - Officer of the Legion of Honour (France, 1946)
  - Knight of the Legion of Honour (France, 1922)
- Commander of the Civil Order of Alfonso XII (Spain, 1931)
- Grand Officer of the Order of the Southern Cross (Brazil, 1941)
- Knight Commander of the Order of the British Empire (United Kingdom, 1956)
- Grand Cross of the Order of Civil Merit (Spain, 1969)
