= Nuno Gonçalves =

Portuguese artist (1425–1491)

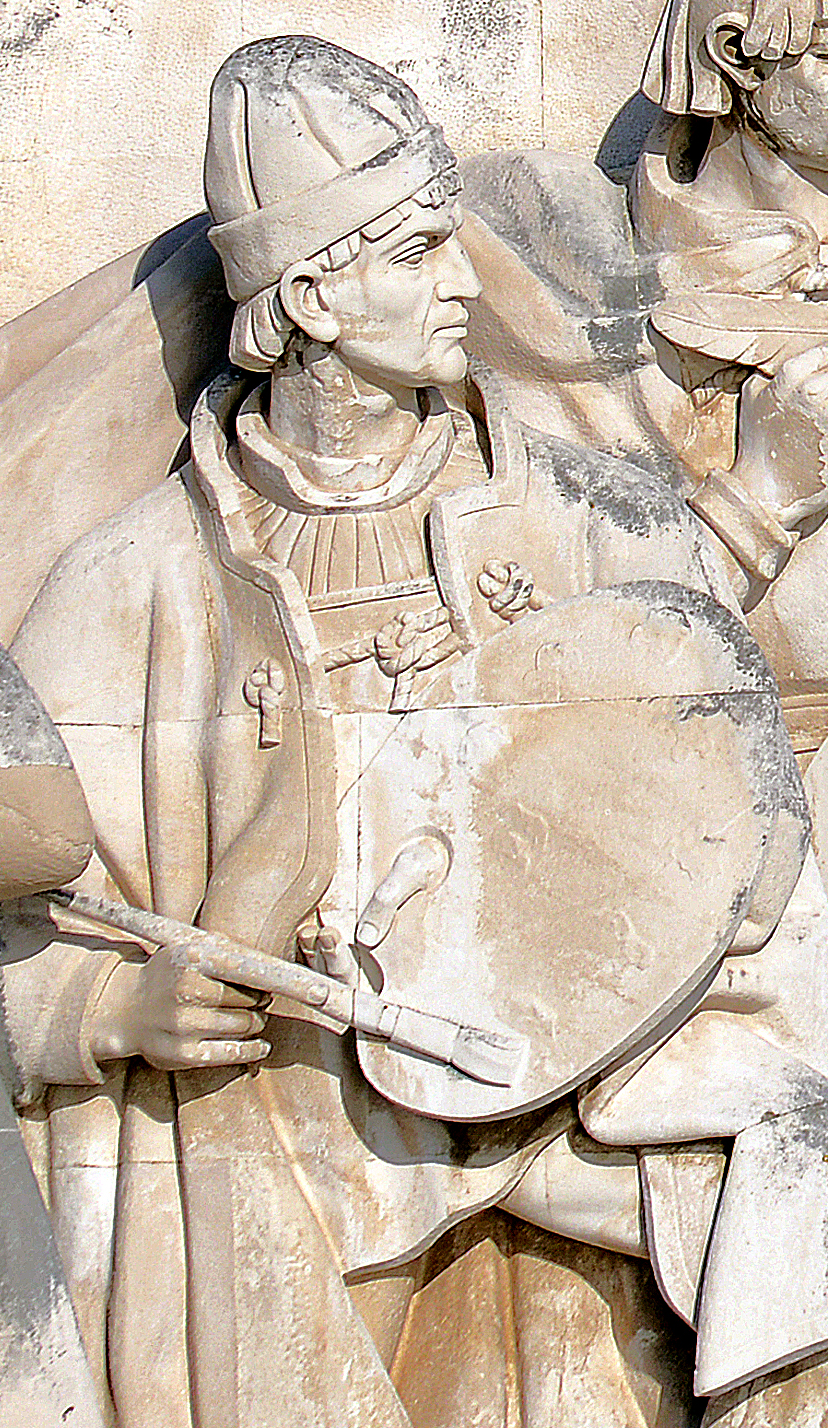
- Effigy of Nuno Gonçalves in the Monument of the Discoveries, in Lisbon, Portugal
- Known for: Renaissance art
- Notable work: Saint Vincent Panels
- Movement: Portuguese Renaissance
- Patrons: Afonso V of Portugal

Nuno Gonçalves (c. 1425 – c. 1491, fl. 1450–71) was court painter to Afonso V of Portugal from 1450 to 1471. Gonçalves is widely considered the most accomplished Portuguese painter of the 15th century. His surviving masterpiece is the polyptych known as the Saint Vincent Panels. He is also believed to have been the author of the Pastrana Tapestries.

== Life ==
The details of Gonçalves's life are almost completely unknown. His paintings, heavily reminiscent of the works of Jan van Eyck, Hugo van der Goes, and Dieric Bouts, suggest he was a student of an artist familiar with Flemish technique and style. One plausible theory is that he received training in the Low Countries, perhaps in the Brussels workshop of Rogier van der Weyden.

Gonçalves was appointed court painter by King Afonso V on 20 July 1450, occupying the position until at least 1471. In recognition of his contributions, he was knighted by Afonso in 1470. In 1471, Gonçalves was designated official painter for Lisbon.

== Legacy ==
Gonçalves is credited with initiating the Portuguese Renaissance in painting. He is depicted, among several other historic figures, on the Padrão dos Descobrimentos, a monument that celebrates the Portuguese Age of Discovery in Belém, Lisbon.

Francisco de Holanda, a 16th-century artist and art essayist, spoke highly of Gonçalves, calling him one of the foremost painters of his era. Art historian Robert Chester Smith described Gonçalves as likely the greatest Portuguese painter of all time, rivalled only by Domingos Sequeira. Chandler Rathfon Post also greatly admired the Portuguese artist, mentioning him often in his lectures at Harvard.

Saint Vincent Panels, Lisbon

== Works ==
=== Saint Vincent Panels ===
Gonçalves was largely forgotten before Jose de Figuerdia, the first director of the National Museum of Ancient Art in Lisbon, attributed the Saint Vincent Panels to him in the early 20th century. Figuerdia's attribution was founded on a reference to an altar of St. Vincent produced by Goncalves in Francisco de Holanda's 1548 manuscript, Pintura Antigua. More definitive evidence of Goncalves's authorship is a signature at the bottom, revealed after cleaning, that appears to be his initials.

One of the most renowned works of the 15th century, the Saint Vincent Panels were likely created between 1450 and 1470 to commemorate Afonso V's victories in Morocco. The polyptych compromises six oil paintings on wood, named left to right Panel of the Friars, Panel of the Fishermen, Panel of the Prince, Panel of the Archbishop, Panel of the Knights, and Panel of the Relic. (Note: The piece was probably originally two triptychs separated by a statue. Azevedo (1957) states "...the present arrangement in a single polyptych seems difficult, if not impossible, to justify. In fact, the presence of the two identical figures round which the composition revolves would seem to be in complete disagreement with the rules of sacred painting, and therefore it seems dangerous to try and fit in a third one in the middle. But this arrangement - although one cannot claim that it was the original without coming up against the above-mentioned objection - does give a sense of unity to the whole work and reveals a tempting symmetry in composition.") The piece is thought to depict Vincent of Saragossa, (Note: The claim that St. Vincent is featured is contested, as the piece lacks recognizable iconography. Some scholars argue that the central figure is in fact Ferdinand the Holy Prince.) present in the two center panels, surrounded by 58 characters representing the royal court and various classes of Portuguese early modern society. Since the discovery of the Panels in the late 19th century, the identities of the figures depicted have been the subject of speculation and debate. Among those commonly identified are Afonso V, Isabella of Coimbra, Henry the Navigator, and Prince John.

=== Style ===
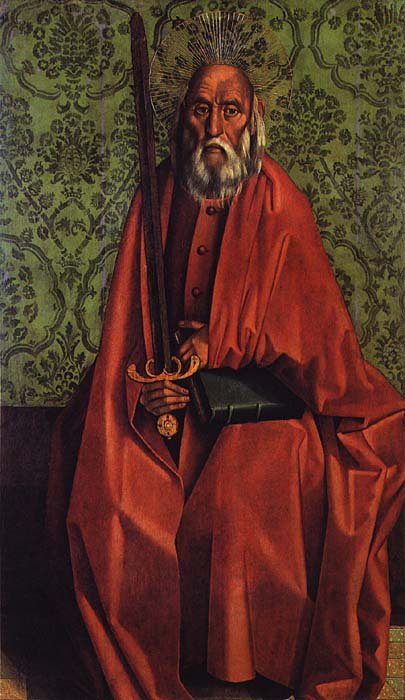
Saint Paul, by Nuno Gonçalves

Gonçalves's work is marked by the portrayal of distinct and expressive faces. He incorporates limited background details, instead concentrating attention upon persons. Although his luminous oil technique and employment of realism were undeniably influenced by contemporary Flemish and Italian schools of art, Gonçalves's emphasis on individuality was unique.

The Saint Vincent Panels are the only work that can be assigned to Gonçalves with confidence but a few other pieces have been tentatively attributed to him based on similarities of style. The following paintings are often attributed to him:

- Saint Vincent Panels, c. 1470–1480, National Museum of Ancient Art, Lisbon
- São Paulo, National Museum of Ancient Art, Lisbon
- São Francisco, National Museum of Ancient Art, Lisbon
- Saint Vincent Tied to a Column, National Museum of Ancient Art, Lisbon
- São Teotónio, National Museum of Ancient Art, Lisbon
- São Pedro, National Museum of Ancient Art, Lisbon
- Portrait of Princess Saint Joana, Aveiro

In addition to painting, Goncalves probably designed the scenes for the Pastrana Tapestries.

== See also ==
- Portuguese Renaissance

== Bibliography ==
English

- Abulafia, David (2001). "The Jew on the Altar: The Image of the Jew in the 'Veneration of St. Vincent' Attributed to Nuno Gonçalves". Mediterranean Studies. 10: 37–48. JSTOR 41166924.
- de Azevedo, Carlos (1957). "PORTUGUESE PAINTERS OF THE XVth AND XVIth CENTURIES". Journal of the Royal Society of Arts. 105 (5015): 928–37. JSTOR 41366178.
- von Barghahn, Barbara (2016). "Blending Myth and Reality: Maritime Portugal and Renaissance Portraits of the Royal Court" (PDF). Journal of Global Initiatives: Policy, Pedagogy, Perspective. 11 (1).
- Da Silva, José Custódio Vieira (2022). "1089: From Romanesque to Gothic: Aesthetic Forms". The Global History of Portugal: From Pre-History to the Modern World. Liverpool University Press. pp. 99–103. doi:10.2307/jj.3485516.31. ISBN 978-1-78976-103-0.
- Ford, James B.; Vickers, G. Stephen (1939). "The Relation of Nuno Gonçalves to the Pietà from Avignon, with a Consideration of the Iconography of the Pietà in France". The Art Bulletin. 21 (1): 5–43. doi:10.2307/3046611. JSTOR 3046611.
- Gowing, Lawrence, ed. (2005). "Gonçalves, Nuño". Biographical Encyclopedia of Artists. Vol. 2. New York: Facts on File. pp. 269–270. ISBN 0816058032.
- de Gusmão, Adriano (1956). "Nuno Gonçalves". The Burlington Magazine. Vol. 98, no. 638. pp. 166–69. JSTOR 871910.
- Kuiper, Kathleen, ed. (2010). The 100 Most Influential Painters & Sculptors of the Renaissance. Britannica Educational Publishing.
- Marjay, Frederic (1972). Lisbon and its Surroundings. Lisbon: Livraria Bertrand, Sarl.
- Markl, Dagoberto L. (2003). "Gonçalves, Nuno". Grove Art Online. Oxford University Press. doi:10.1093/gao/9781884446054.article.T033155. ISBN 978-1-884446-05-4.
- Rebelo, Luis (2003). "Gonçalves, Nuño". In Gerli, E. Michael (ed.). Medieval Iberia : an encyclopedia. New York: Routledge. pp. 770–771. ISBN 0-415-93918-6.
- Salavessa, E.; Aranha, J; Moreira, R.; Freire-Lista, D.M. (2024). Jung, Jason J. (ed.). "Proto-Early Renaissance Depictions, Iconographic Analysis and Computerised Facial Similarity Assessment Connections: The 16th Century Mural Paintings of St. Leocadia Church (Chaves, North of Portugal)". Heritage. 7: 2031–2054. doi:10.3390/heritage7040096.
- dos Santos, Reynaldo (1956). Ramsey, L.G.G. (ed.). "Portuguese Art 800-1800". The Connoisseur.
- Sarton, George (1935). "Preface to Volume XXII: Lusitanian Memories". Isis. 22 (2): 440–455. JSTOR 225128.
- Smith, Robert C. (1968). The Art of Portugal: 1500-1800. New York: Meredith Press.
- Smith, Robert C. (1940). "Early Portuguese Painting". Magazine of Art. Vol. 33.
- Whelpton, Peter (1973). "Literature, Art, and Architecture". Portugal (Second ed.). Collins.
- "Gonçalves, Nuño". Benezit Dictionary of Artists. Oxford University Press. 2011. doi:10.1093/benz/9780199773787.article.B00076539. ISBN 978-0-19-977378-7.

Portuguese

- de Figueiredo, José (1910). O pintor Nuno Gonçalves. Lisbon.
- Pereira, Paulo, ed. (1995). História da Arte Portuguesa. Vol. I. Lisbon: Círculo de Leitores.

German

- Mayer, August L. (1913). "NUNO GONÇALVES". Monatshefte für Kunstwissenschaft. 6 (3): 95–98. JSTOR 24494111.
