= Márta Grabócz =

Hungarian music critic and university professor (born 1952)

Márta Grabócz (born 10 October 1952 in Budapest) is a Franco-Hungarian musicologist, professor at the University of Strasbourg and senior member of the Institut Universitaire de France...

== Education and career ==
Grabocz is the daughter of the Hungarian composer Grabócz Miklós (1927-1974). She graduated in musicology from the Franz Liszt Academy of Music in Budapest in 1979.

=== Academic career in Hungary ===
Márta Grabócz studied musicology at the Franz Liszt Academy of Music in Budapest and was a researcher at the XXth century Music and Esthetics Department at the Hungarian Academy of Sciences in Budapest (1977-1990).

From 1986 to 1989, she was the driving force (together with János Maróthy) behind the creation of the first studio for computer music in Hungary. The studio was dedicated to creation, research and pedagogy. After 1990, its equipment was moved over to the Franz Liszt Academy of Music in Budapest.

Márta Grabócz is currently a member of the External Advisory Board of the Human Sciences Research Institute (BTK) at the Hungarian Academy of Sciences and a member of the Semiotics Working Group at that same Academy (since 2019).

=== Academic career in France ===
In 1985, she obtained her PhD at Paris I University. Her doctoral thesis (domain: “Esthetics and Arts”) under the direction of Michel Guiomar, dealt with the influence of narrative programs on musical forms: "Influence du programme sur l’évolution des formes instrumentales. Morphologie des œuvres pour piano de F. Liszt".

In 1991, she was appointed at Marc Bloch University, and in 1995 became professor at that same university. In parallel, she taught a course on the semiotics of music at University of Paris 8 Vincennes-Saint-Denis (1992-1995). In 1997, she created "Jeune équipe - Méthodes nouvelles en musicologie" (JE 2114) at Strasbourg University, a group she supervised until 2001. She also directed the Approches contemporaines de la création et de la réflexion artistiques (ACCRA, EA 3402) research group from 2002 until 2010.

In 1993, she completed her post-doctoral studies at Panthéon-Sorbonne University and was awarded her habilitation degree. (She was a Research Associate at IDEAT, a joint research center CNRS-université Panthéon-Sorbonne from 2000 to 2009).

She has been in member of the Labex GREAM (now: ITI CREAA), University of Strasbourg and responsible of research programs on semiotics and narratology: ‘Signification, sémiotique et narratologie musicales’ at Strasbourg University since 2011. (Presently: that of axis on ‘Memory and invariables’).

She is a contributing author to the Encyclopædia Universalis, writing the entry on Franz Liszt.

She has been a member of the French Academic Institute (IUF) between 2009-2014 and between 2015–2020 (holding an accentuated research position).

She is also an editor of the Music Studies Collection at Éditions des Archives Contemporaines (Paris, London).

== Awards ==
- 2010: Bence Szabolcs Award for musicologists, awarded by the Ministry of Culture in Hungary
- 2011: Chevalier dans l’Ordre des Palmes académiques (Ministère de l’Enseignement Supérieur et de la Recherche, France)
- 2017: Chevalier de la Légion d'honneur

== Research ==
Márta Grabócz is the author or co-editor of several books related to signification and meaning in music, music semiotics, musical narratology and contemporary music Her research focuses on new methods in musicology with special attention given to the analysis of expression and signification in musical forms with respect to benefits from human sciences (literary semiotics, narratology, extra-musical models, etc.) and to the production of various 19th, 20th and 21st c. composers including Franz Liszt, Béla Bartók, György Kurtág, Péter Eötvös, François-Bernard Mâche, Kaija Saariaho, Philippe Manoury, Pascal Dusapin, Jean-Claude Risset a.o. To date (2021), she has published 168 articles (including chapters in collective volumes, proceedings of international conferences or articles in various national and international journals – in French, Hungarian, English, German and Spanish). She was a guest speaker at 55 international conferences and symposia (delivering 14 keynote lectures) and many other conferences or scientific seminars at a national level. She organized (or co-organized) 16 international conferences (including 5 sessions as part of conventions) and 24 other events: study days or lectures, workshops, etc.

== Books (selection) ==
=== Books as author ===
- Morphologie des œuvres pour piano de F. Liszt. Influence du programme sur l’évolution des formes instrumentales, MTA Zenetudományi Intézet [Institut de Musicologie de l’Académie des Sciences de Hongrie], Budapest, Hongrie, 1986. 2nd edition: Kimé, 1996, 214 pages (Enlarged edition, with a foreword by Charles Rosen, introduction and index). ISBN 978-2841740345
- Zene és narrativitàs [Musique et narrativité], Editions Jelenkor, 2004, 250 pages. ISBN 978-9636762346
- Musique, narrativité, signification, L’Harmattan, 2009, 380 pages (with a foreword by Charles Rosen) . ISBN 978-2296093874
- Entre naturalisme sonore et synthèse en temps réel. Images et expression dans la musique contemporaine, EAC, 2013, 285 pages.ISBN 978-2-8130-0122-1 BnF 43734604q

=== Books as director of publication ===
- Les Modèles dans l’art. Musique, peinture, cinéma, Presses Universitaires de Strasbourg, 1997. ISBN 978-2868206732
- Méthodes nouvelles, musiques nouvelles. Musicologie et création, Presses Universitaires de Strasbourg, 1999. ISBN 978-2868200907
- Sens et signification en musique, Hermann, 2007, 300 pages. ISBN 978-2705666828
- Gestes, fragments, timbres. La musique de György Kurtág, with Jean-Paul Olive, L’Harmattan, 2009. ISBN 978-2296074736
- Les Opéras de Peter Eötvös entre Orient et Occident, EAC, 2012. ISBN 978-2813000903
- Des temporalités multiples aux bruissements du silence. Daniel Charles in memoriam, with Geneviève Mathon, Hermann, 2013. ISBN 978-2705684389
- Tanulmànykötet Ujfalussy József emlékére, [Festschrift à la mémoire de József Ujfalussy], with Melinda Berlász, L’Harmattan Budapest, 2014. ISBN 978-9632367842
- Les grands topoï du XIX^{e} siècle et la musique de F. Liszt, Hermann, 2018. ISBN 978-2705693541
- François-Bernard Mâche : Le compositeur et le savant face à l’univers sonore, codirection avec G. Mathon, 2018, Hermann. ISBN 978-2705695811
- Modèles naturels et scénarios imaginaires dans les œuvres de P. Eötvös, F.-B. Mâche et J.-C. Risset, Hermann, 2020, 250 pages. ISBN 979-1037003225
- György Kurtág. Les Œuvres et leurs interprétations. Contributions collected and edited by Márta Grabócz, Álvaro Oviedo, Jean-Paul Olive, Paris, Hermann 2021, 182 pages. ISBN 979-1037006264
- Narratologie musicale. Topiques, théories, et stratégies analytiques, Hermann-GREAM, 2021, 568 pages. ISBN 979-1037006370

=== Books as director of collection ===
Márta Grabócz is the founder and director of a collection dedicated to the writings of contemporary composers and musicologists.

- François-Bernard Mâche : Cent opus et leurs échos, L’Harmattan, Paris, 2012, 322 pages.
- Jean-Claude Risset : Composer le son. Repères d’une exploration du monde sonore numérique, Écrits, Volume 1, Paris, Hermann, 2014, 442 pages.
- Jean-Claude Risset, Écrits, Volume 2, Le numérique, un nouvel artisanat pour la création musicale / The Craft of Musical Creation in the Digital Era. Tools and Musical Works, Hermann–GREAM, 2018, 534 pages.
- François-Bernard Mâche : Le Sonore et l’universel. Écrits au tournant du 19e siècle, EAC, Paris, 2018.
- Constantin Floros : L'Homme, l'amour et la musique, Paris, Editions des Archives Contemporaines, 2018, 220 pages.
- Jean-Claude Risset : Écrits, Volume 3, Timbre, perception, virtualité. Le compositeur face à la recherche / Timbre, Perception, Virtuality. A Composer’s Approach to Research, Hermann–GREAM, 2020, 570 pages.

=== Edition of music and musicology journals ===
- New Musicology. Critical perspectives, Filigrane, No. 11, Sampzon, Delatour France, 2010 (co-edited with Makis Solomos) [42256241 : linked bibliographic record in the BnF catalogue]
- Analyse Musicale, 65, numéro spécial 200e anniversaire de F. Liszt, September 2011 (co-edited with Laurence Le Diagon).

=== Chapters in books (recent selection in English) ===
- “The ‘Preludio’ of the Four Orchestral Pieces, op. 12 by Béla Bartók. An intertextual analytical approach”, in: Music Semiotics: A Network of Significations – in Honour and Memory of Raymond Monelle, ed.: Esti Sheinberg, Surrey, London, Ashgate, 2012, pp. 115–128.
- “Archetypes of Initiation and Static Composition in Contemporary Opera: Works of F. B. Mâche, P. Dusapin, and G. Dazzi”, in: Musical Narrative after 1900, ed.: Michael Klein & Nicholas Reyland, Bloomington, Indiana University Press, 2012, 101-124.
- “Value in Contemporary Art and the Category of the ‘Sublime’ in New Music (works of F.-B. Mâche, J.-C. Risset and P. Eötvös), in: Music. Function and Value. Proceedings of the 11th International Congress on Musical Signification, Krakow 2010, ed.: Teresa Malecka, Malgorzata Pawlowska, Musica Iagiellonica, Krakow.
- “Some Aspects of Musical Narratology: The Topic of Walking and its Evolution in the Music of György Kurtág”, Proceedings of the conference “MUSIC THEORY AND ANALYSIS”, Belgrade, 2011 University of Arts, Faculty of Music, ed. Milos Zatkalik, Cambridge Scholar Publishing, Newcastle upon Tyne, 2013, 207-236.
- “An Introduction to Theories and Practice of Musical Signification and Narratology”, in: Musical Analysis: Historia, Theoria, Praxis, Vol. 4, ed. Anna Granat-Janki, Wroclaw, 2016, 325-340.
- “Musical Semiotics Today: Theories of the Signified and Examples of Narrative Strategies”, in: Interpreting Musical Works from a Semantic Perspective, dir. Anny Nowak, Akademia Muzyczna I. Felisa Nowowiejskiego w Bydgoszczy (ed. Anna Nowak, Bydgoszcz, 2018, 9-30.
- “From Music Signification to Musical Narrativity: Concepts and Analyses”, in: The Routledge Handbook of Music Signification, dir. Esti Sheinberg and William Dougherty, London & New York, Routledge, 2020, 197-206.
