= André Lischke =

French musicologist and translator

André Lischke (born 1952 in Paris) is a French musicologist and translator, specialising in Russian classical music.

== Biography ==
André Lischke was born into a family of Russian immigrant musicians. He began his musical education at the piano. After courses in musical composition, he turned to musicology with Michel Guiomar at the Schola Cantorum, then with Norbert Dufourcq and Yves Gérard at the Conservatoire de Paris, where he obtained his first prize. He specialized in Russian music and passed his doctoral thesis at the Sorbonne with Tchaikovski au miroir de ses écrits for subject (1996).

As a journalist and music critic, he collaborates with magazines such as Diapason, L'Avant-scène opéra and Lyrica. He is also a producer of radio programs.

Between 1989 and 1997, he was artistic director of the record label Le Chant du Monde, a company soon bought over by Harmonia Mundi.

Since 2001, André Lischke has been teaching at the University of Evry where he runs a research laboratory: RASM, or research performing arts and music, which is unique in its kind.

== Writings ==
=== Monographs ===
- La musique en Russie depuis 1850 (in French). Paris/Nantes: Fayard/Mirare. 2012. p. 219. ISBN 978-2213666419. OCLC 779752730.
- Histoire de la musique russe;des origines à la Révolution. Les Chemins de la musique (in French). Paris: Fayard. 2006. p. 792. ISBN 2-213-62387-2. OCLC 79476731.
- Alexander Borodine. Horizons (in French). Paris: Bleu Nuit Éditeur. 2004. p. 176. ISBN 2-913575-70-6. OCLC 469694268.
- Tchaikovsky au miroir de ses écrits; textes choisis, traduits et présentés par André Lischke. Écrits de musiciens (in French). Paris: Fayard. 1996. p. 434. ISBN 2213595755. OCLC 36233585.
- Piotr Ilyitch Tchaikovsky. Bibliothèque des grands musiciens (in French). Paris: Fayard. 1993. p. 1132. ISBN 2-213-03191-6. OCLC 415843850.

=== Direction ===
- Moussorgski, La Khovantchina. Opéra (in French). Paris: L'Avant-scène. 1983. p. 226. OCLC 49183749.
- Tchaïkovski, La dame de pique. Opéra (in French). Paris: L'Avant-scène. 1989. p. 177. OCLC 495959150.
- Moussorgski, Boris Godounov. Opéra (in French). Paris: L'Avant-scène. 1999. p. 175. ISBN 2843851629. OCLC 716906780.
- Prokofiev, Guerre et paix. Opéra (in French). Paris: L'Avant-scène. 2000. p. 142. ISBN 2843851645. OCLC 716378365.
- Rimski-Korsakov, Le coq d'or. Opéra (in French). Paris: L'Avant-scène/Éditions Premières Loges. 2002. p. 125. ISBN 2843851823. OCLC 51947464.

=== Translations ===
- Nikolaï Rimski-Korsakov (2008). Chronique de ma vie musicale (in French). Paris: Fayard. p. 454. ISBN 978-2213635460. OCLC 470985925.
- Solomon Volkov (1980). Témoignage, les mémoires de Dimitri Chostakovitch (in French). Paris: Albin Michel. p. 326. OCLC 32424023.
