= Saint Vincent Tied to a Column =

Painting by Nuno Gonçalves

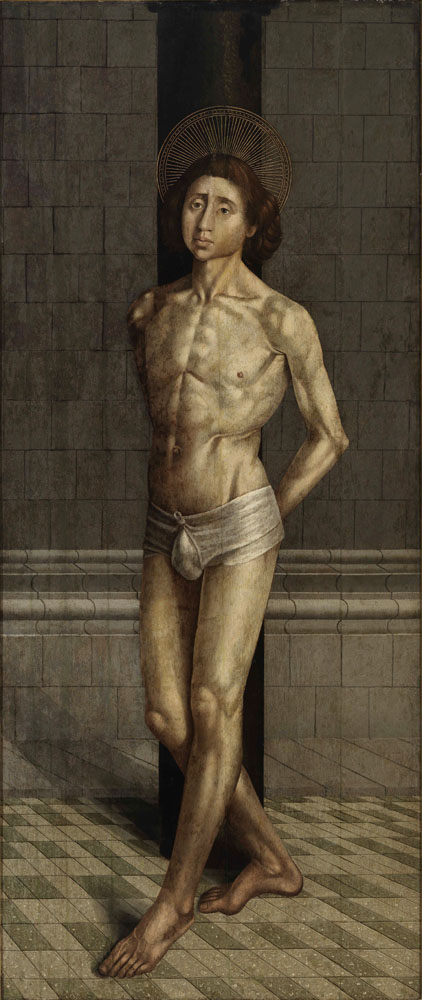
- Artist: Nuno Gonçalves
- Year: c. 1470–1480
- Type: Oil on oakwood
- Dimensions: 209 cm × 89 cm (82 in × 35 in)
- Location: National Museum of Ancient Art, Lisbon

Saint Vincent Tied to a Column (Portuguese: São Vicente Atado à Coluna) is a painting attributed to Portuguese Renaissance artist Nuno Gonçalves, created c. 1470–1480. It is held at the National Museum of Ancient Art, in Lisbon.
