= José Simões de Almeida =

Portuguese sculptor (1880–1950)

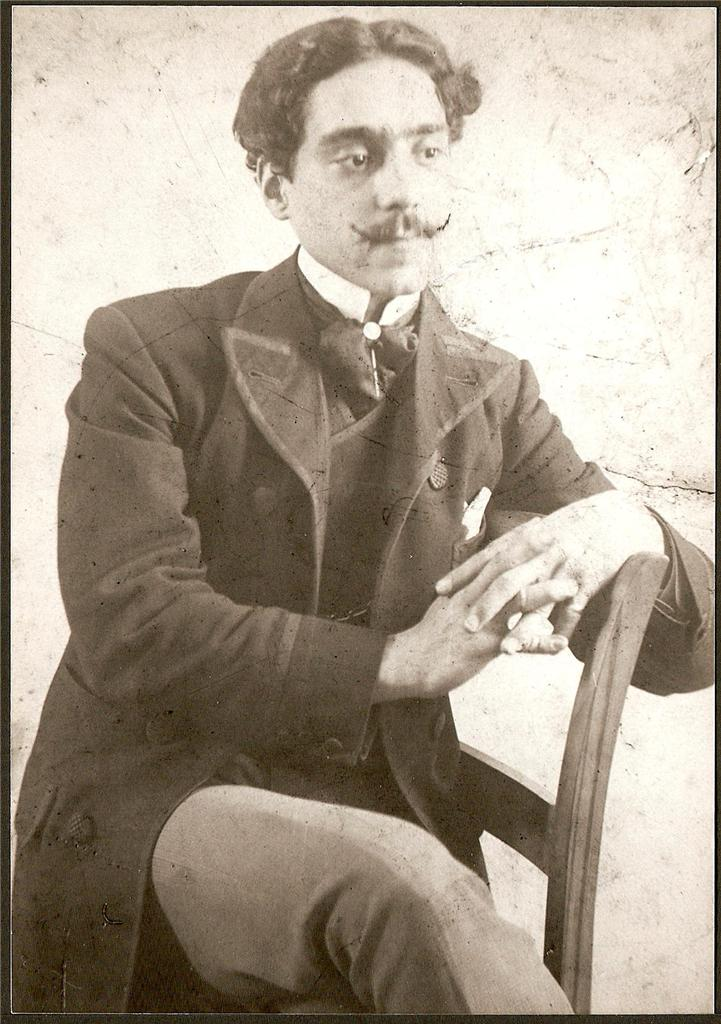
- Born: 17 June 1880; Figueiró dos Vinhos, Republic of Portugal
- Died: 2 March 1950 (aged 69); Lisbon, Portuguese Republic
- Occupation: Sculptor
- Years active: 1904–1950
- Spouse: Margarida Borges Gomes Alcântara Simões de Almeida
- Children: 1

José Simões de Almeida (sobrinho) (17 June 1880 – 2 March 1950) was a Portuguese naturalist sculptor. As the nephew of José Simões de Almeida, who was also a sculptor, he is identified by having sobrinho (Portuguese for nephew) placed after his name.

== Biography ==
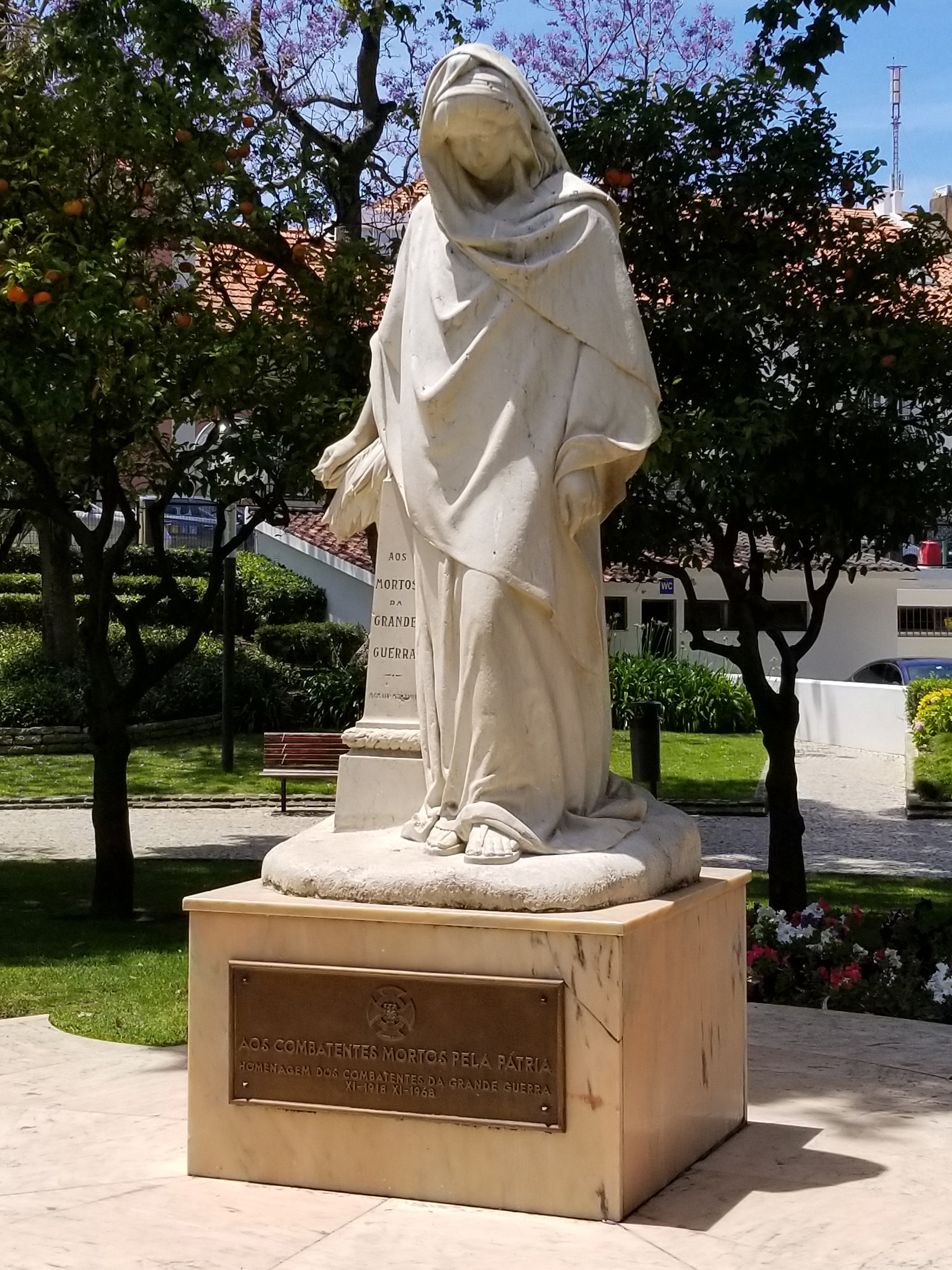
A statue in Cascais in memory of the dead in World War I

José Simões de Almeida (sobrinho) was born in Figueiró dos Vinhos in the Leiria District of Portugal on June 17, 1880. In 1893, at the age of 13, he enrolled at the School of Fine Arts in Lisbon, now the Faculty of Fine Arts at the University of Lisbon. From 1897 he took the Sculpture course at the same school and was a student of his uncle, José Simões de Almeida. After finishing the course, he obtained a scholarship to study in Paris, where he stayed between 1904 and 1907, receiving lessons from Raoul Verlet and Jean-Paul Laurens. He married Margarida Borges Gomes Alcântara Simões de Almeida who was also an artist. In 1915 he would become professor of sculpture at the School of Fine Arts.

Simões de Almeida sculpted busts and monuments and other works of an official and commemorative character. One of his first works was a statue of Bento de Góis, for the explorer's home town of Vila Franca do Campo on São Miguel Island in the Azores, which was inaugurated in 1906. Simões de Almeida also offered a statue of Prince Henry the Navigator to São Miguel in 1932, to commemorate the 5th centenary of the discovery of the Azores.

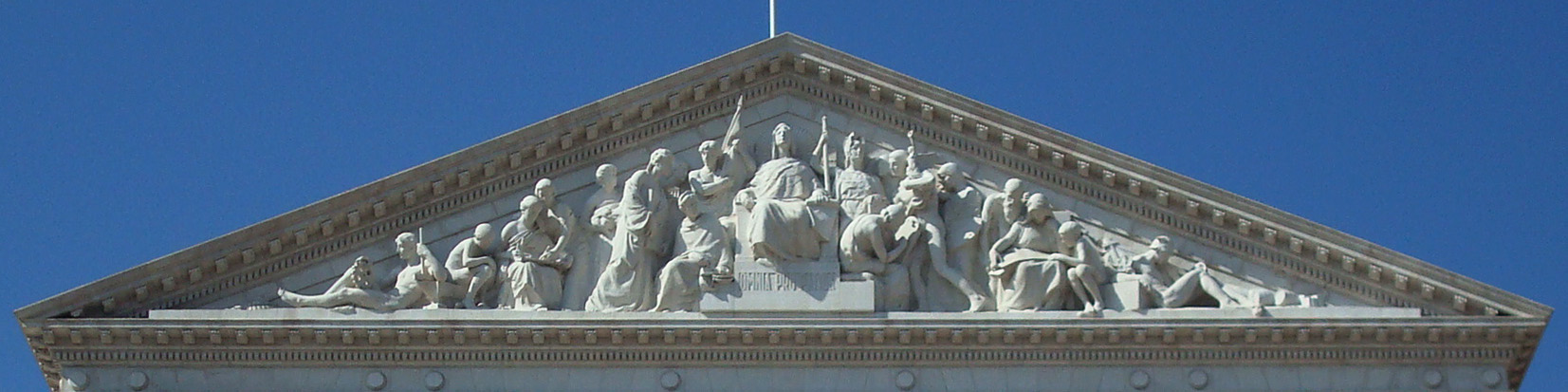
Tympanum sculpted by Simões de Almeida at the façade of the Portuguese parliament

For the São Bento Palace, the Portuguese parliament, he executed the official bust of the Portuguese Republic in 1908. The original is now in the Museum of the President of the Republic but numerous reproductions have also been made. Other works at São Bento Palace include allegories of the Constitution and Justice and the tympanum at the façade of the building.

He executed a bas-relief for the staircase of Lisbon City Hall, and the bas-reliefs of the monument to the Marquis of Pombal in Lisbon. He also sculpted busts, including one of the Portuguese statesman, Fontes Pereira de Melo. Several of his works are in the Chiado Museum in Lisbon. His work is also to be found outside Portugal, including in Brazil, Cuba and Mozambique.

Following the overthrow of the Portuguese Monarchy in 1910, the First Portuguese Republic invited local artists to competitively submit designs for a new series of coins. From the many submissions received, one of Simões de Almeida was chosen to go on the 1 Escudo silver coin as well as on a 10 Escudo coin.

Simões de Almeida died in Lisbon on 2 March 1950. Among the many awards he received, both during his life and posthumously, was being featured on a Portuguese postage stamp in 1971.
