= Portrait of Princess Saint Joanna =

Painting attributed to Nuno Gonçalves

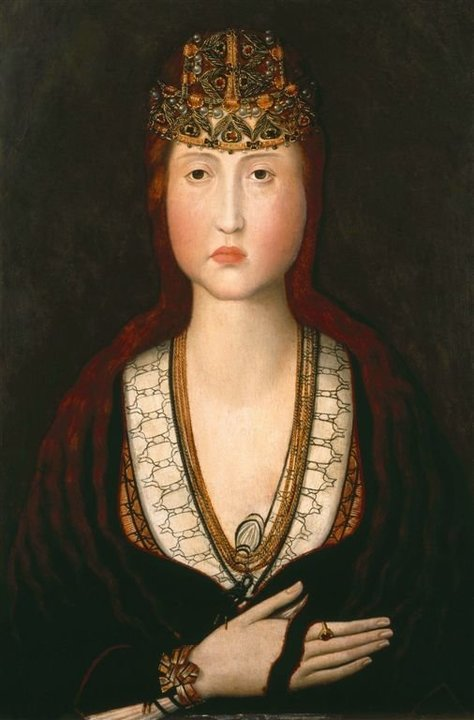
- Artist: Nuno Gonçalves
- Year: c. 1472–1475
- Type: Oil on oakwood
- Dimensions: 60 cm × 40 cm (24 in × 16 in)
- Location: Stª Joana Princesa Museum, Aveiro

The Portrait of Princess Saint Joanna (Portuguese: Retrato da Princesa Santa Joana) is an oil on oakwood painting attributed to Portuguese Renaissance artist Nuno Gonçalves, from c. 1472–1475. It is held in the Museu de Aveiro. It is believed to have been painted during the time when Joanna, Princess of Portugal was regent for her father, Afonso V of Portugal.

== History and description ==
Princess Joanna was the first child of King Afonso V, but lost the right to succession to the throne when her younger brother, the future John II of Portugal was born, in 1455. After rejecting several marriage proposals, she entered the Convent of Jesus of Aveiro of the Dominican order for women in Aveiro, in 1475, where she lived until her death, following in all things the rule of life of the nuns, but without ever taking nun's vows because she was a royal princess and potential heir to the throne.

The work depicts the bust of Princess Saint Joanna, facing forward, dressed in court attire. Her long, light-colored hair is held in place by a gold coif, studded with precious stones and pearls. She wears a boat-neck dress with a lace neckline, her right hand resting on her lap, partially covered by a lock of hair, and a ring on her index finger.

The portrait was supposedly brought by Dona Philippa, the daughter of Infante Pedro, Duke of Coimbra, to the Convent of Jesus in Aveiro, where it remains. When religious orders were dissolved and their property was nationalized, in 1834 the work became state property.

According to the art historian Pedro Dias, this portrait is the most beautiful of the early Portuguese painting. A touching work, where the Princess is shown as a young woman in court attire, it certainly came from a court painter, and the aesthetic and technical level of the work, as well as the feeling it reveals, points to the authorship of Nuno Gonçalves.
