= Saint Paul (Gonçalves) =

Painting by Nuno Gonçalves

- São Paulo (Portuguese)
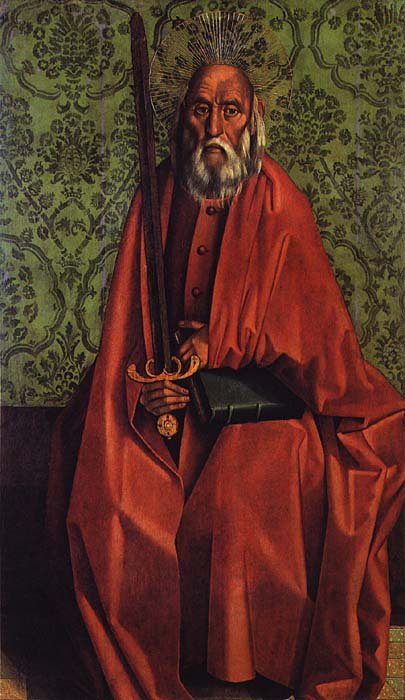
- Artist: Nuno Gonçalves
- Year: c. 1470–1480
- Type: Oil on oak
- Dimensions: 135 cm × 83 cm (53 in × 33 in)
- Location: National Museum of Ancient Art; Lisbon

Saint Paul (Portuguese: São Paulo) is an oil on oak painting attributed to the Portuguese Renaissance artist Nuno Gonçalves, executed c. 1470–1480. It represents the Apostle Paul, seated and dressed in red, the colour of martyrdom, holding up a sword, with a book on his lap. It is held in the National Museum of Ancient Art, in Lisbon.
