= Saint Francis (Gonçalves) =

Painting by Nuno Gonçalves

- São Francisco (Portuguese)
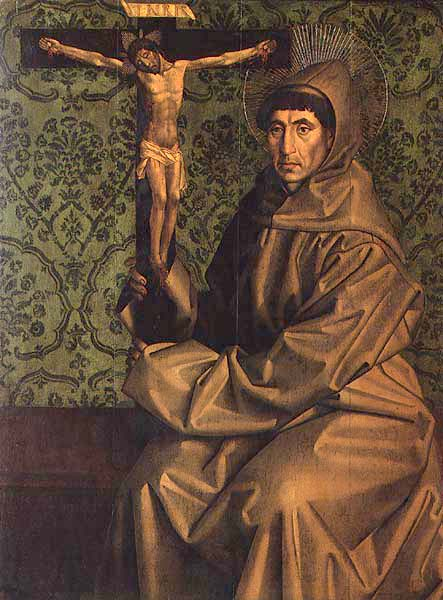
- Artist: Nuno Gonçalves
- Year: c. 1470–1480
- Type: Oil on oak
- Dimensions: 117 cm × 90 cm (46 in × 35 in)
- Location: National Museum of Ancient Art, Lisbon

Saint Francis (Portuguese: São Francisco) is an oil on oak painting attributed to the Portuguese Renaissance artist Nuno Gonçalves, executed c. 1470–1480. It is held in the National Museum of Ancient Art, in Lisbon.

It is a depiction of Saint Francis. He appears in his monk habit, with an hood covering his head, seated, while holding with both hands a crucifix.
