= Joanna, Princess of Portugal =

Portuguese princess (1452–1490)

Joanna of Portugal
- Hereditary Princess of Portugal
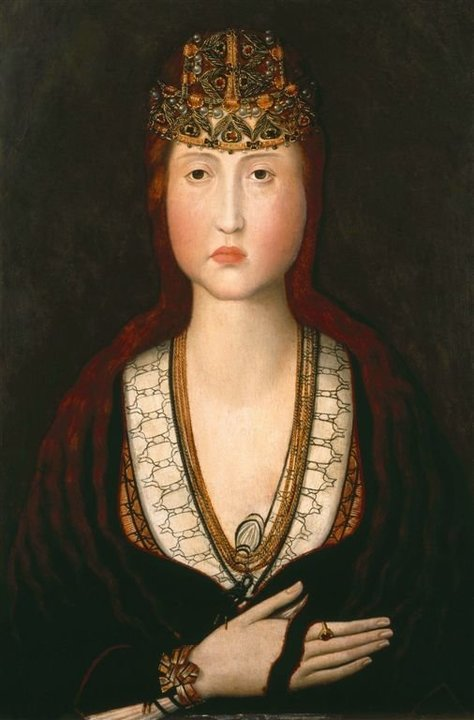
- Portrait of Princess Saint Joana; 1471
- Born: 6 February 1452; Lisbon, Portugal
- Died: 12 May 1490 (aged 38); Aveiro, Portugal
- Burial: Convent of Jesus in Aveiro
- House: Aviz
- Father: Afonso V of Portugal
- Mother: Isabel of Coimbra
- Religion: Catholicism

Blessed Joana de Portugal OP
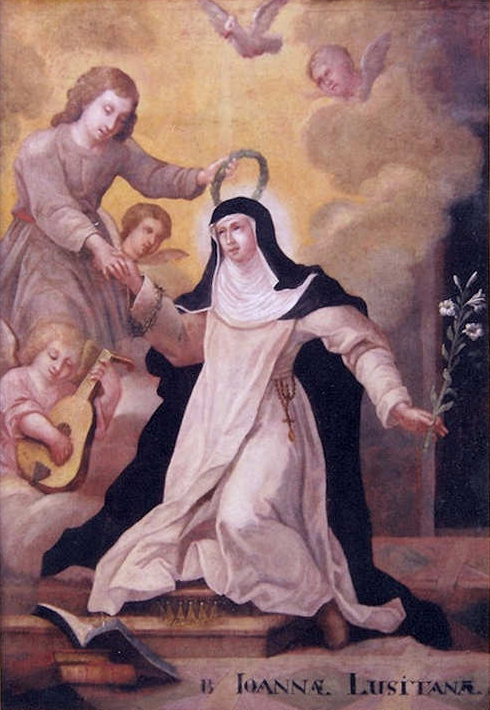
- Venerated in: Roman Catholic Church
- Beatified: 16 February 1692, Saint Peter's Basilica, Papal States by Pope Innocent XII
- Feast: 12 May

Joanna of Portugal OP (6 February 1452 – 12 May 1490; Portuguese: Joana, Portuguese pronunciation: [ˈsɐ̃tɐ ʒuˈɐnɐ pɾĩˈsezɐ]) was a Portuguese regent princess of the House of Aviz, daughter of King Afonso V of Portugal and his first wife, Queen Isabel of Coimbra. She served as regent during the absence of her father in 1471. In 1475 she became a cloistered nun of the Dominican Order. She is venerated in the Catholic Church with the title 'Blessed', is commemorated by a feast on May 12, and is commonly known in Portugal as Holy Princess Joan (Portuguese: Santa Joana Princesa).

== Early life ==
Joanna was the second child of Afonso, but after the early death of her older brother John in 1451, she was recognized as heir presumptive and given the title of Princess of Portugal. Other children of the king were infantes. Upon the birth of her younger brother, the future John II of Portugal, in 1455, she ceased to be heir presumptive, but among the people she continued to be known as Princess Joanna.

From a young age, Joanna expressed a desire to become a nun; however, as she was second-in-line to the throne, her father did not allow it.

During his military expedition to Tangier in 1471, Joanna served as Regent of the Portuguese Kingdom.

== Marriage proposals ==
After vehemently refusing several proposals of marriage, Joanna joined the Dominican Convent of Jesus in Aveiro in 1475. Her brother had by then fathered an heir, so the family line was no longer in danger of extinction, and thus she entered the convent that same year her nephew Afonso was born in 1475. Still, she was compelled several times to leave the convent and return to court. She turned down an offer of marriage from Charles VIII of France, 18 years her junior. Her father abdicated in 1477, died in 1481, and was succeeded by her brother.

In 1485, she received another offer, from the recently-widowed Richard III of England, who was only eight months younger. This was to be part of a double marital alliance, with his niece Elizabeth of York marrying her cousin, the future Manuel I. However, his death in battle, of which Joanna allegedly had a prophetic dream, halted those plans.

== Later life ==
She continued to be a great supporter of her brother, John II of Portugal, throughout his reign and her life.

Joanna died on 12 May 1490 in Aveiro and was buried in the Convent of Jesus in Aveiro. She bequeathed all her wealth to the convent. She was beatified in 1693 by Pope Innocent XII. In honour of her beatification, an official account of her life was issued in Italian. Although she has not been canonized, in Portugal she is known as the Princess Saint Joanna.

== Revival ==
In the early 18th century, the Portuguese nobility, clergy and court had a revival in interest in the princess. During this time, the Portuguese artist Manuel Ferreira e Sousa was the most famous artist in the revival. He was contracted by various religious institutions, noblemen, and even the royal family to paint scenes from her life.

== Gallery ==
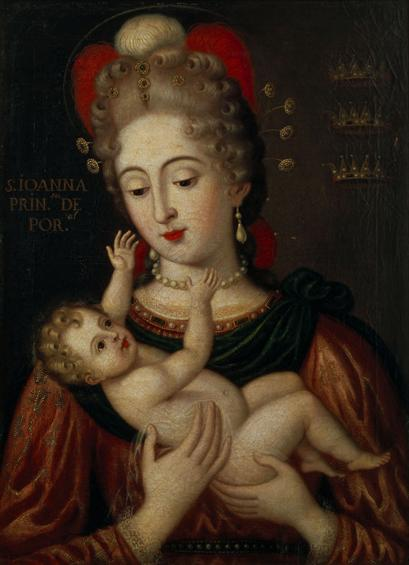
Princess Saint Joanna with the Infant Jesus; by Joao Baptista Pachim, 18th century.

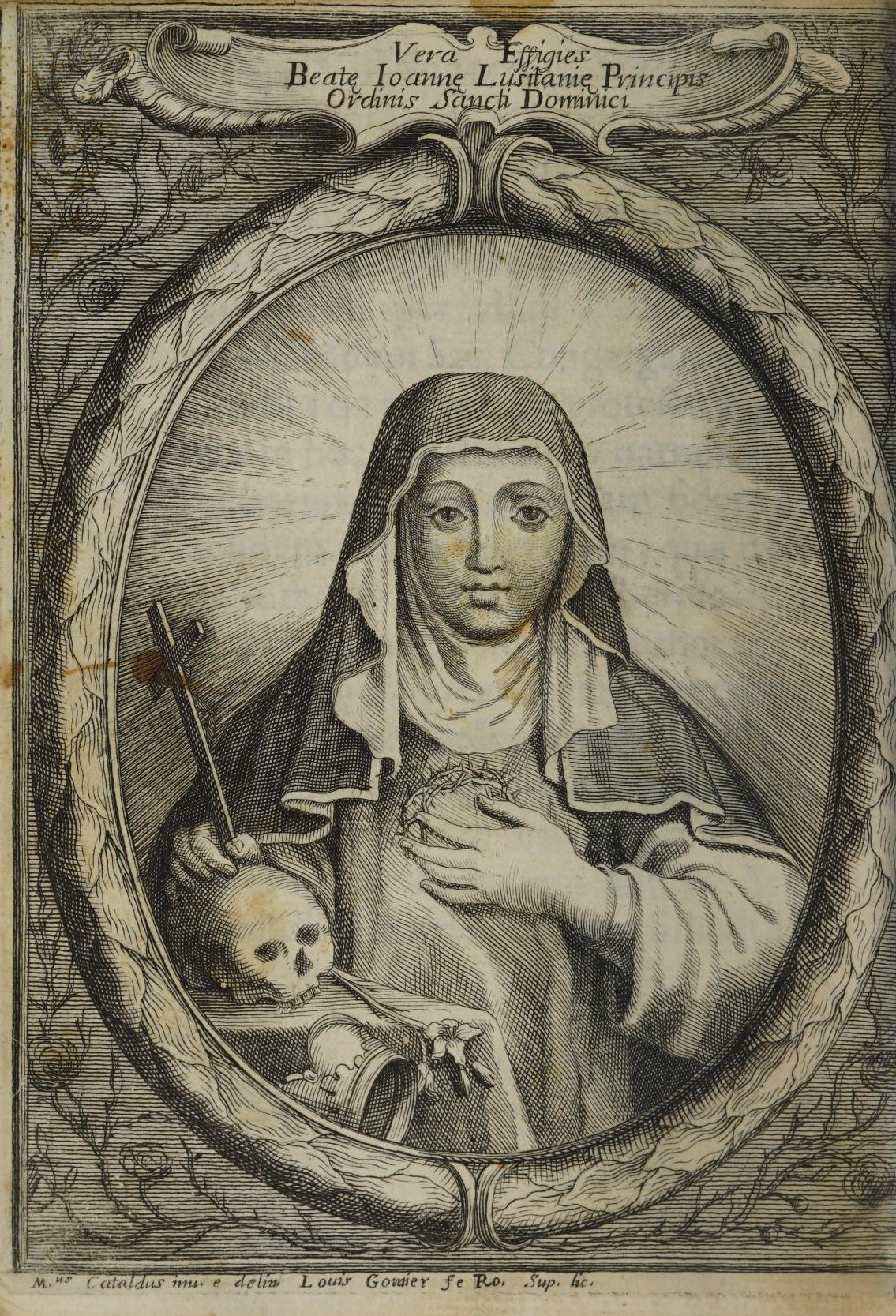
Engraving depicting the ‘saintly princess’ holding a skull, a crucifix, and a crown of thorns. Credit: Women of the Book Collection, Sheridan Libraries, Johns Hopkins University. Printed in Breve Narratione Della Vita della Beata Giovanna Principessa di Portogallo Dell’Ordine di San Domenico. Appellata communemente la Santa Principessa. Raccolta da un religioso Dell'istess' Ordine di Lei Devoto, Rome, 1693.
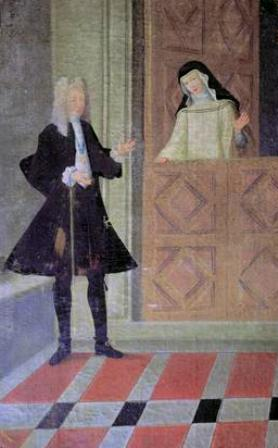
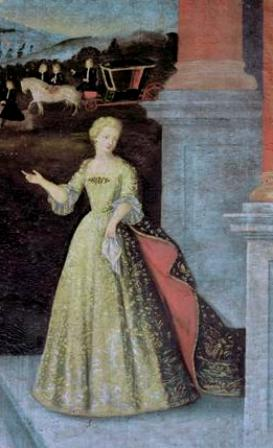
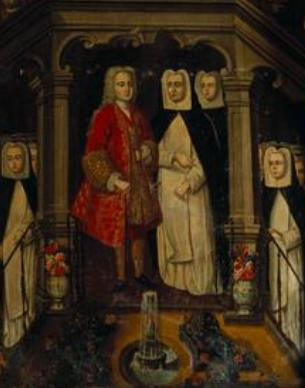
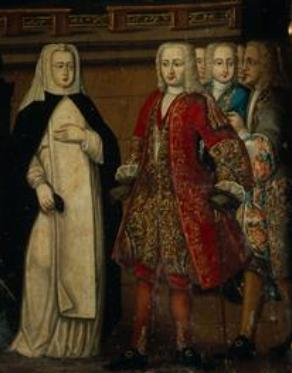
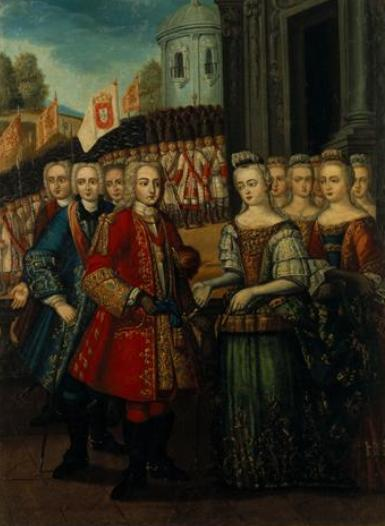
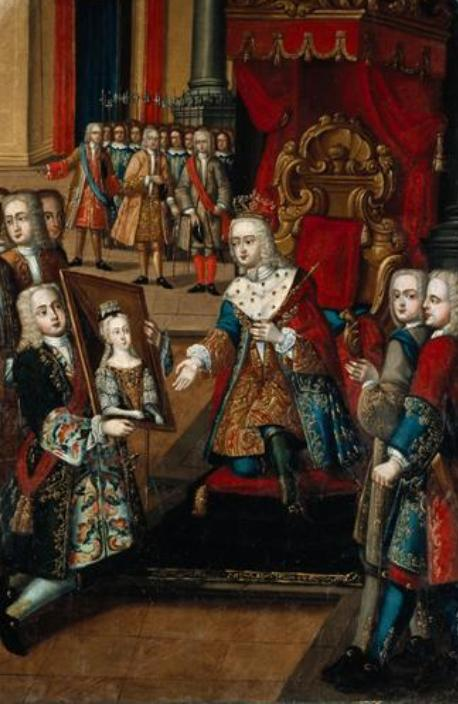
Manuel Ferreira e Sousa's paintings of Princess Saint Joanna of Portugal were highly contracted from the 1720s to the 1740s.

== Ancestry ==
Ancestors of Joanna, Princess of Portugal

8. John I of Portugal
4. Edward, King of Portugal
9. Philippa of Lancaster
2. Afonso V of Portugal
10. Ferdinand I of Aragon
5. Eleanor of Aragon
11. Eleanor of Alburquerque
1. Joanna of Portugal
12. John I of Portugal (= 8)
6. Peter, Duke of Coimbra
13. Philippa of Lancaster (= 9)
3. Isabel of Coimbra
14. James II, Count of Urgell
7. Isabella of Urgell
15. Isabella of Aragon

== Sources ==
- "Crónica da Fundação do Mosteiro de Jesus de Aveiro e Memorial da Infanta Santa Joana" [Chronicle of the Foundation of the Monastery of Jesus of Aveiro and Memorial of the Infanta Santa Joana]. Museu de Aveiro/Santa Joana (in Portuguese). Aveiro: Arquivo Municipal de Aveiro. 1467–1874.
- Luís, Isabel (1513–1525). "Memorial da Infanta Santa Joana" [Memorial of the Infanta Santa Joana]. Corpus de Textos Antigos em português até 1525 (in Portuguese). Lisboa: Centro de Linguística da Universidade de Lisboa.
- Garcia, Mayra Rúbia (2003). A princesa infanta Joana (1452-1490) [Princess Infanta Joana (1452-1490)] (PDF) (Master's thesis) (in Portuguese). Goiânia: Universidade Federal de Goiás.
- Paula, Nuno Gonçalo Rebelo da (2018). O culto a Santa Joana Princesa em Aveiro - memórias e percursos [The cult of Saint Joana Princess in Aveiro - memories and paths] (Master's thesis) (in Portuguese). Porto: Universidade do Porto.
- Souza, Gabrieu de Queiros (2017). A construção narrativa da santidade da Princesa Joana de Portugal (1452-1490) [The narrative construction of the sanctity of Princess Joana of Portugal (1452-1490)] (Master's thesis) (in Portuguese). Curitiba: Universidade Federal do Paraná.
- "The Twelfth Day of May". The Martyrology of the Sacred Order of Friars Preachers. 1955. Archived from the original on 2006-02-11.
- Williams, Barrie. "The Portuguese Princess's Dream". Richard III Society, American Branch. Archived from the original on 2010-07-10.

Joanna, Princess of Portugal House of Aviz Cadet branch of the House of Burgundy Born: 6 February 1452 Died: 12 May 1490
Preceded by Ferdinand	Princess of Portugal; 1452–1455	Succeeded by John (future John II)
