= Pastrana Tapestries =

15th-century Portuguese tapestries

The Landing at Asilah (Closeup)
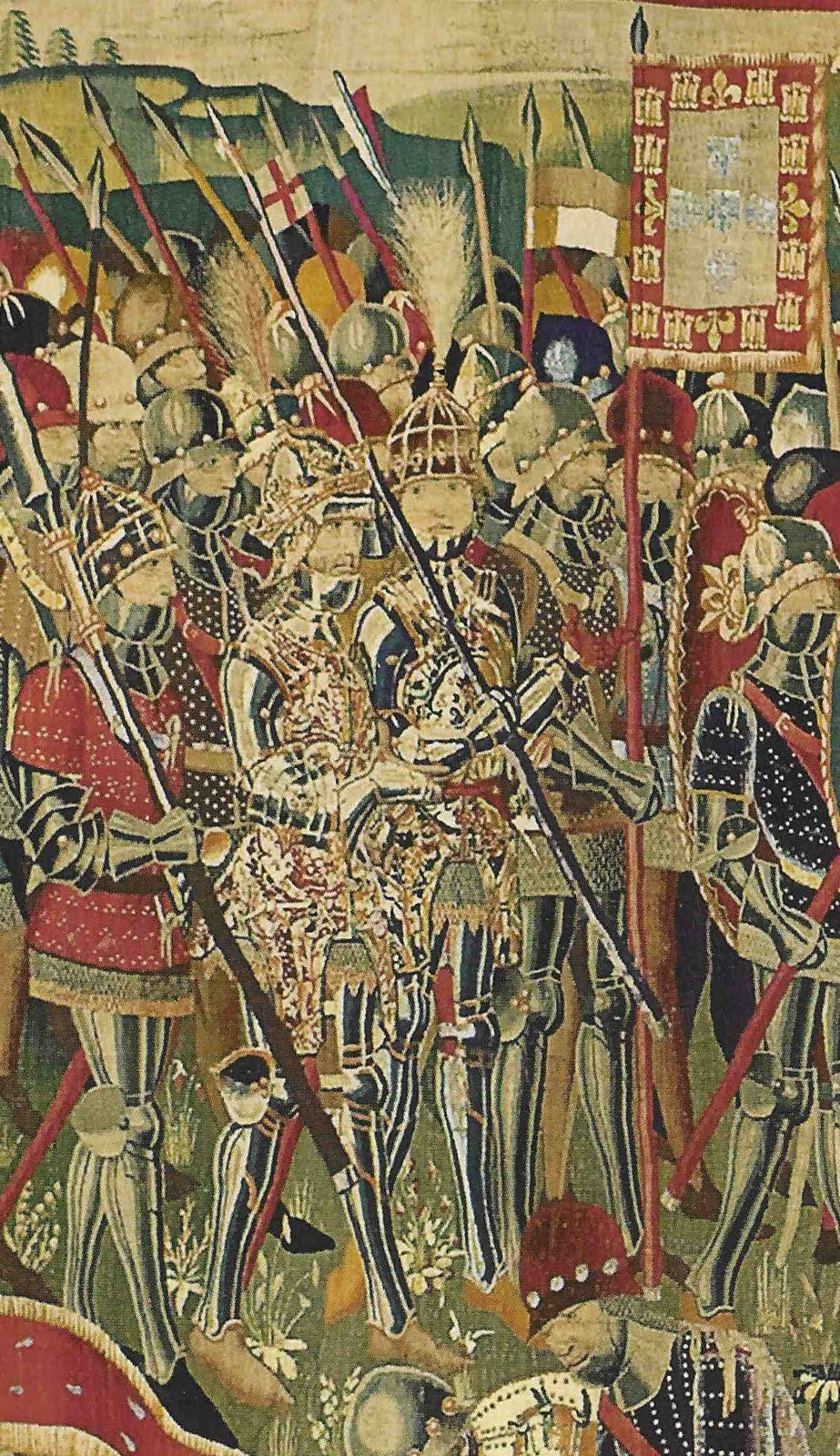
- Closeup of the second tapestry, The Landing at Asilah, showing King Afonso V and Prince João II
- Artist: Nuno Gonçalves, Pasquier Grenier workshop
- Year: 1471
- Subject: King Afonso V's conquest of Asilah and Tangier
- Dimensions: 36 feet by 12 feet
- Location: Colegiada de Pastrana Museum, Spain

The Pastrana Tapestries (Portuguese: Tapeçarias de Pastrana) are four large tapestries commissioned by king Afonso V of Portugal to celebrate the successful conquest of the Moroccan cities of Asilah and Tangier by the Portuguese in 1471. Each measures about 11 by 4 meters (36 by 13 ft), and are made of wool and silk.

The four tapestries are titled: The Landing at Asilah, The Siege of Asilah, The Assault on Asilah, and The Fall of Tangier. Their historical context ties in with the Portuguese conquests and expansion of North Africa, begun by King John I and continued by his grandson, Afonso V.

The tapestries have undergone extensive restoration after natural damage by moths. They have been kept at the Colegiada de Pastrana Museum in Spain since the 17th century.

== History ==
The tapestries' manufacture has been attributed to the workshop of Pasquier Grenier in Tournai, modern-day Belgium. The tapestries are remarkable for being one of the few surviving 15th-century works of weaving depicting contemporary rather than biblical or mythological episodes. They set the precedent for trends for the next three centuries, as sets of tapestries became the grandest form of military art, a prominent example being the set commissioned some sixty years later by Emperor Charles V showing his Tunis campaign, and the English Armada Tapestries fifty years after that.

Though the work has been linked back to Pasquier Grenier, part of the work can also be credited to Nuno Gonçalves, who was appointed as King Afonso V's official court painter in 1450. After King Afonso V's conquest of Asilah and Tangier, Nuno was tasked with creating cartoons in color to celebrate the King's triumphs, and those cartoons were used as reference for the creation of the tapestries.

Documentation reveals that the tapestries were held in the palace of dukes of El Infantando in Guadalajara, Spain in 1628; they were seen by Sousa, written in his Epitome de las Historias Portuguesas. Later in 1664, the son of the prince of Eboli, Rui Gomes da Silva, donated the tapestries to the Colegiada de Pastrana Museum. The tapestries have been kept in Pastrana, Spain, since 1664.

== Historical context ==
The Pastrana Tapestries were already held in high regard for their accurate representations of weapons and armor for its time, and they also serve as a reference for important historical events, acting as accounts for what transpired during the time that Afonso V reigned as King.

Afonso V's conquest was part of the Portuguese expansion into North Africa, a continuation of the efforts begun by Afonso V's grandfather, João I. João I previously conquered Ceuta, a coastal North African city in 1415. Alfonso V's expansion built upon the conquered lands Portuguese already claimed, and he sought to exploit more lands that could be economically profitable.

Moreover, Afonso V wanted to extend the power of Portugal's military further in North Africa, as well as the influence of the Catholic Church. Strategically, both Asilah and Tangier are located near the Strait of Gibraltar, the link between the Atlantic Ocean and the Mediterranean Sea.

In 1471, lfonso V then began his conquest of the North African cities, first landing at Asilah and launching an attack. The king and his son João II, followed by the Portuguese army, surprised the town, leading to an intense battle and the Muslim citizens of Asilah trying to defend their town from the attackers. Ultimately, the Portuguese won and overtook Asilah, with numbers estimating to about 2,000 residents killed with over 5,000 captured. After they conquered Asilah, they set their sights on Tangier, and the citizens of Tangier were under the impression that the governor of Asilah would assist in the defense of their town; however, the governor was occupied with a war already with the Fez governor, resulting in him signing Tangier over to the Portuguese in a treaty. Upon hearing the news, the citizens of Tangier packed their belongings and left their town while the Portuguese army marched to occupy Tangier.

== Description ==
The tapestries depict four episodes regarding the conquest of Asilah and Tangier:

- The Landing at Asilah
- The Siege of Asilah
- The Assault on Asilah
- The Fall of Tangier

They feature an impressive array of detailed depictions of Gothic plate armours and weapons such as swords, crossbows, polearms, cannons, and even hand cannons, which would have been innovative in the period.

=== The Landing at Asilah ===
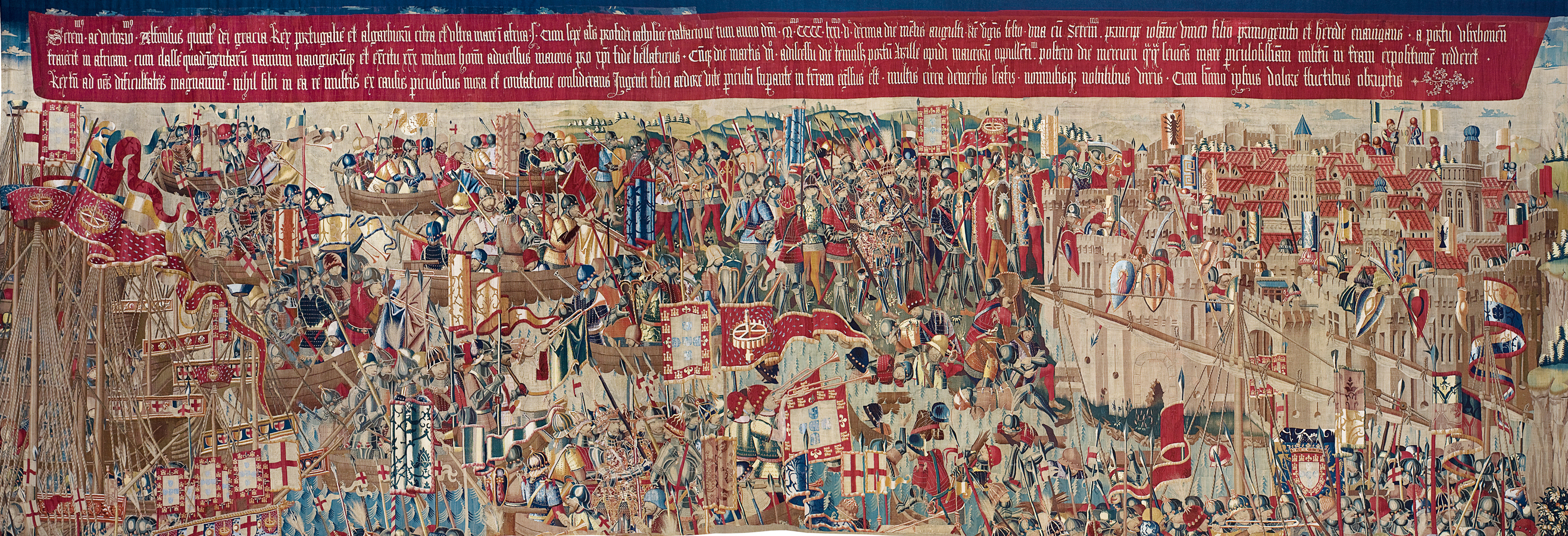

This first tapestry details the events of King Afonso V's army's arrival at the coast of Asilah. Like all the tapestries, it measures from 12 x 36 ft. At the top, there is a large inscription describing the landing and creating a narrative focused on the kings journey to the shore. The soldiers are seen approaching the shore on their boats, and King Afonso V is with Prince João II on the upper right side, advancing toward the city with other soldiers. The residents of the town are seen on the defensive, having been taken by surprise by the Portuguese Army's arrival.

=== The Siege of Asilah ===
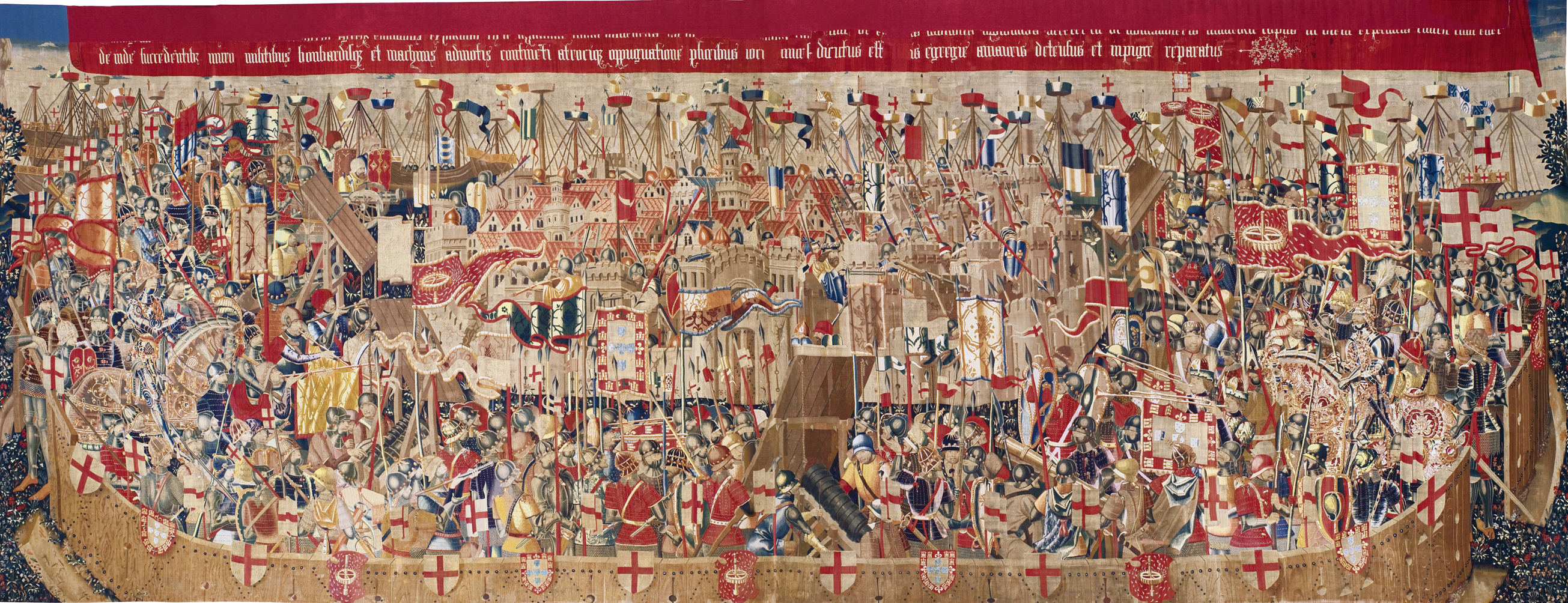

Following the Landing at Asilah, the second tapestry out of the four highlights the siege of the town. It took over the total span of three days for the soldiers of the Portuguese army to seize Asilah. Many of the soldiers are seen on the large fleet placed in the center foreground of the tapestry, and the remaining ships can be seen surrounding the outskirts of the town. There is a separation on the left and right sides of the tapestry, one half of the army split and led by Prince João II on the left side, while the right side is led by King Afonso V. The visual representation of the siege was altered, changing the actual geographical traits of the city and not matching the real appearance of Asilah. This is due to the fact that the creators were not familiar with the actual layout of Asilah, leading them to base it off of Northern Europe architecture of high roofs and pointed spires.

=== The Assault on Asilah ===
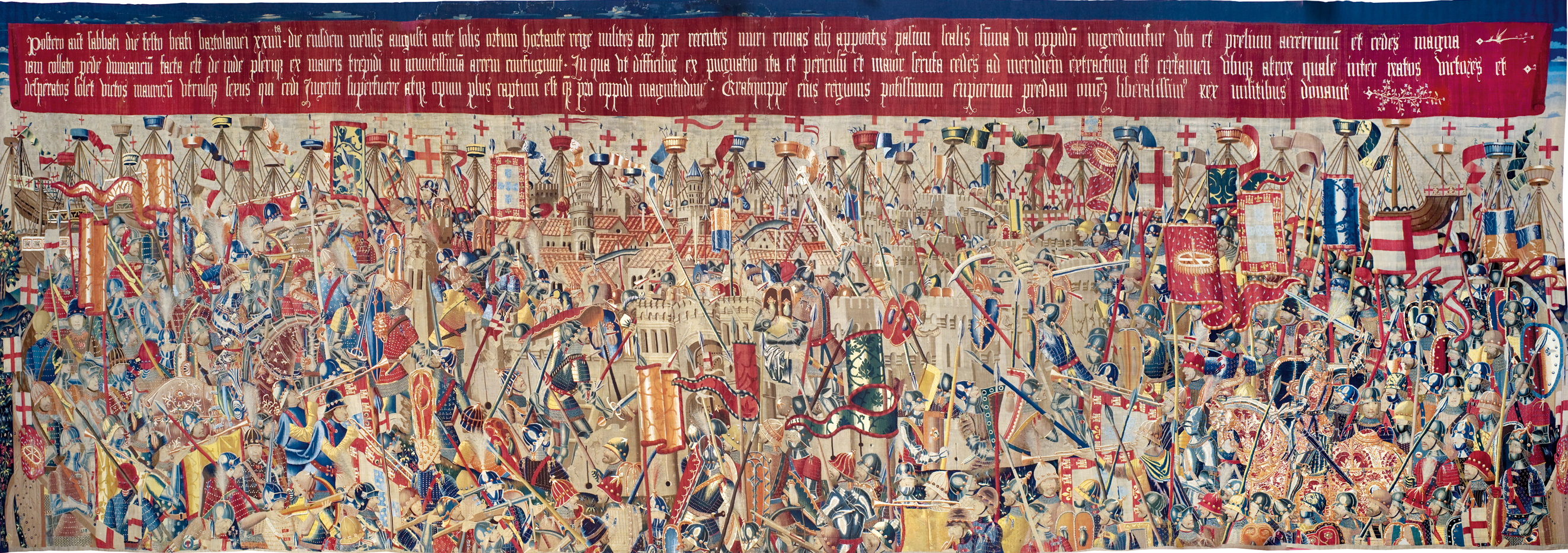

Another inscription is written on the top of the tapestry, this one describing the army's breakthrough into the wall of the city, launching a full attack. Soldiers scattered throughout the tapestry can be seen with weapons, swords or spears raised, and some can be seen playing instruments amongst the crowd. Some soldiers are drawn climbing over the walls, the raised swords and spears from within the boundaries of the wall heavily depict the massacre occurring within this scene. Over 2,000 residents were killed with over 5,000 captured.

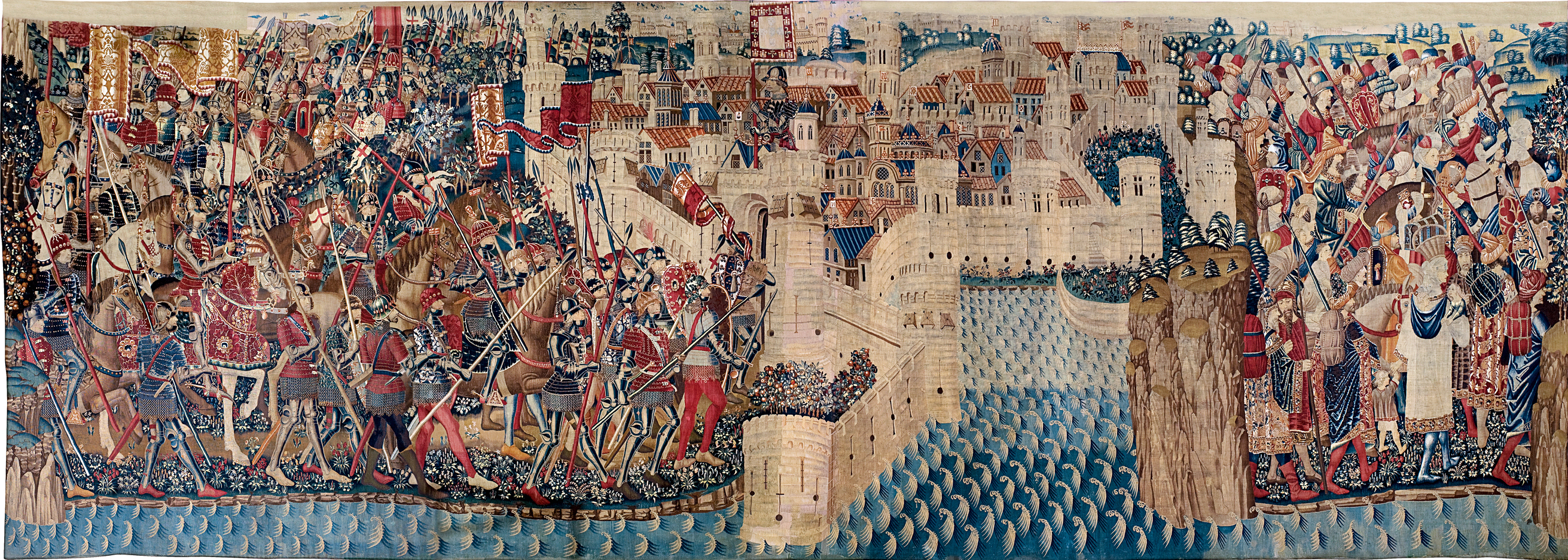

=== The Fall of Tangier ===
The final tapestry details the soldiers moving on to take over Tangier after conquering Asilah, which resulted in Tangier being occupied by the Portuguese army. The right side of the tapestry shows the inhabitants of Tangier leaving the city as they knew the fate of Asilah and how their city was already signed over to the Portuguese. They collected their belongings and left, and the city in the middle shows a Portuguese soldier holding up a banner representing Portugal above the city's walls. In contrast to the previous tapestries, the soldiers appear less aggressive and walking at a steady pace, due to the city already having been signed over. The people are depicted with their children holding their hands as they exit their homes, their expressions solemn, and with their bags of belongings on their backs as they leave to the right of the tapestry.

== Restoration and preservation ==
In a restoration completed in the 1950s, the tapestries were given newer freshly woven silk, making it prey to moths who ate holes through them. This restoration took place at the Real Fabrica De Santa Barbara in Madrid, Spain. After the moths attacked the fresh fabrics, they ventured to the older original pieces of the tapestries.

This culprit was later discovered to be none other than the common clothes moth, a type of fungus moth. After this discovery, all of the tapestries had to be cleaned and exterminated of these pests, leading to an extensive process to rid them completely.

After discovering the moth pests responsible for damaging all four of the tapestries, the insects had to be exterminated. Rentokil, a pest control company based in England, handled the extermination process. The project was funded by the Fundación Carlos de Amberes and the Belgian Inbev-Baillet Latour Fund.

Their method consisted of depriving the insects of oxygen; this process required them to put the tapestries into a receptacle sealed with aluminum laminates. After being sealed shut, the oxygen was absorbed and replaced with nitrogen, resulting in the oxygen levels lower than 0.4%. With such a low amount of oxygen, the moths, including the larva and eggs, died off. The standard amount of time that is usually recommended for this procedure is thirty days, however the tapestries were kept in that state for around sixty days.

Once all the moths were removed, there was still much more to be done to finish restoring the tapestries. Though the pests were gone, the damage they left behind was still visible; gaping holes were visible in varying areas of the fabric, and there were also stains and dirt that had accumulated over time. Dyes were also bleeding in certain areas from a previous restoration, and all of these impurities needed to be addressed for a thorough restoration this time around.

Next, dust was removed from the tapestries by the use of a dust suction system as the tapestries were laid completely flat on tables in the quarantine room of the Royal Manufacturers De Wit, a facility dedicated to cleaning dirty textiles. The dust was removed with the vacuuming unit and collected in an external unit outside the room so it could be removed. With the dust gone, the tapestries were then cleaned with water and a small amount of detergent, employed in a technique called aerosol suction, another specialty of the Royal Manufacturers De Wit. The process involved laying the tapestries out on a suction table, and an aerosol (mixture of air and water) was sprayed above the tapestries, with the suction table allowing the fabric to gradually moisten with the aerosol mixture. A mild detergent was added to aid with the cleaning process, and the fabric got rinsed with just the aerosol mixture of air and water afterwards. The tapestries were dried with the help of sponge tissues and absorbent papers placed over the tapestries, completed with a plastic sheet on the very top. The moisture was taken away through the suction, and any remaining moisture was vacuumed.

Following the cleaning process, the tapestries could now be restored. Fabrics were placed on the backside of the tapestry where the restoration would take place, making it more stable in areas where the fabric was fragile and had holes. Angled stitches and large vertical stitches were used to create a strong hold between the new and existing fabric, and the holes were then repaired with stitches following the path of the original stitches.

== Gallery ==
Landing at Asilah	Siege of Asilah
Storming of Asilah	Takeover of Tangiers
