= Carlos de Azevedo =

Portuguese professor and curator

Carlos Mascarenhas Martins de Azevedo (18 May 1918 – 14 October 1995) was a Professor in the history of art and architecture and a curator at the National Museum of Contemporary Art Portugal. Considered an important figure in the promotion of Portuguese culture, as well as for his research work, he was honoured with a colloquium “Homenagem a Carlos de Azevedo” (Homage to Carlos de Azevedo) on the centenary of his birth that took place at the São Roque Museum of the Santa Casa Da Misericórdia de Lisboa in May 2018.

== Early life and education ==
Carlos de Azevedo was born in Lisbon but spent his early years in Lourenço Marques (now Maputo), Mozambique as his parents moved there when he was just two years old. In Mozambique he attended an English school, becoming bilingual. After the family returned to Portugal in 1929, he attended the Lyceum Camões and, following the death of his mother when he was 14, he studied at the Colégio Infante de Sagres in Lisbon. At the behest of his father he firstly studied law but he did not take to it so he enrolled in a Germanic Philology degree course. He completed the degree in 1945 with a thesis on Wagner’s dramatic theory that reflected his lifelong love of music.

== Career ==
In 1946 Carlos de Azevedo moved to England with his wife to become Portuguese Reader at the University of Oxford. He gained an MA from Wadham College and became a Fellow in 1947. Upon his return to Portugal, he firstly worked at the National Museum of Ancient Art for four years, and, in 1951, he was invited to take part in a study of the Portuguese architecture in Goa, Damão and Diu, India.

Cementing his interest in art and architecture he studied Numismatics and Art History at the University of Lisbon and was appointed conservator and curator at the National Museum of Contemporary Art in Lisbon in 1955, a role he undertook until 1960. In 1957 he applied to the Calouste Gulbenkian Foundation for a scholarship grant to research the architecture of Portuguese manor houses. The resultant book Solares Portugueses was published in 1969 with a second edition in 1988.

Carlos de Azevedo lectured both at home and abroad, specifically in London and America where he undertook a series of lectures on Portuguese art at various universities and museums in a number of cities. He also undertook research on architecture in Italy at Villa I Tatti.

Between 1960 and 1973 he was executive secretary of the Fulbright programme established between the Portuguese and American governments. His final position from 1983, until his retirement from public work in 1986, was as advisor to Natália Correia Guedes who was the first President of the Portuguese Institute of Cultural Heritage.

== Legacy ==
As well as the research he undertook that resulted in multiple published works both in Portuguese and English, the Calouste Gulbenkian Foundation holds a collection of correspondence, which they consider important to the study of the history of art in Portugal in the modern period, between Carlos de Azevedo and fellow art historians, for example, Robert C. Smith, Professor at the School of Fine Arts, University of Pennsylvania, whose speciality was Brazilian and Portuguese Baroque and C. R. Boxer, Camoens Professor of Portuguese studies at King's College London, whom he met while in Oxford. Charles Boxer and Carlos de Azevedo later worked on the book Fort Jesus and the Portuguese in Mombasa, 1593-1729.

Photographs attributed to Carlos de Azevedo are held in the Conway Library at The Courtauld Institute of Art, London, whose archive, of primarily architectural images, is in the process of being digitised under the wider Courtauld Connects project.

== Selected publications ==
- Churches of Portugal, Photographs by Chester E. V. Brummel, New York : Scala Books, 1985, ISBN 0935748660
- Baroque Organ-Cases of Portugal, Organ Literature Foundation, 1972, ISBN 0913746231
- Fort Jesus and the Portuguese in Mombasa, 1593-1729, C.R. Boxer and Carlos de Azevedo, London : Hollis and Carter, 1960
