= Guimard =

Guimard may refer to:

== People ==
- Carlos Guimard (1913– 1998), Argentine chess grandmaster
- Cyrille Guimard (born 1947), French cyclist and commentator
- Gilles-Barnabé Guimard (1734–1805), French architect of the late 18th century
- Hector Guimard (1867–1942), French architect, popularizer of Art Nouveau
- Marie-Madeleine Guimard (1743–1816), French ballerina
- Paul Guimard (1921–2004), French writer

== Places ==
- Hôtel Guimard, home of Marie-Madeleine Guimard
- Hôtel Guimard (Art Nouveau), home of Hector Guimard
