= Guilherme Gomes Fernandes =

Portuguese firefighter

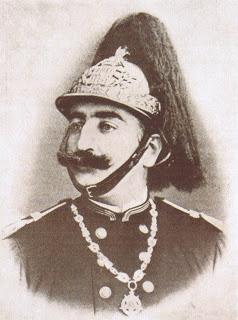

Guilherme Gomes Fernandes (1850–1902) was a founder of the Humanitarian Association of Volunteer Firefighters (1874–75) and the Public Salvation Corps in Portugal. He became Commander of the fire department in 1877. He combated the fire of the Baquet Theater in 1888 as the Commander of the Volunteer Fire Department of the Port. He created and directed the newspaper "O Bombeiro Voluntario." There are a number of streets named for him in Portugal. There is a monument by sculptor Bento Candido Silva that was inaugurated in 1915 in the Plaza de Guilherme Gomes Fernandes in Vitoria City of Port in Portugal. A stamp with his portrait was issued in 1953 in Portugal.
