= Saint Vincent Panels =

Panels by Nuno Gonçalves

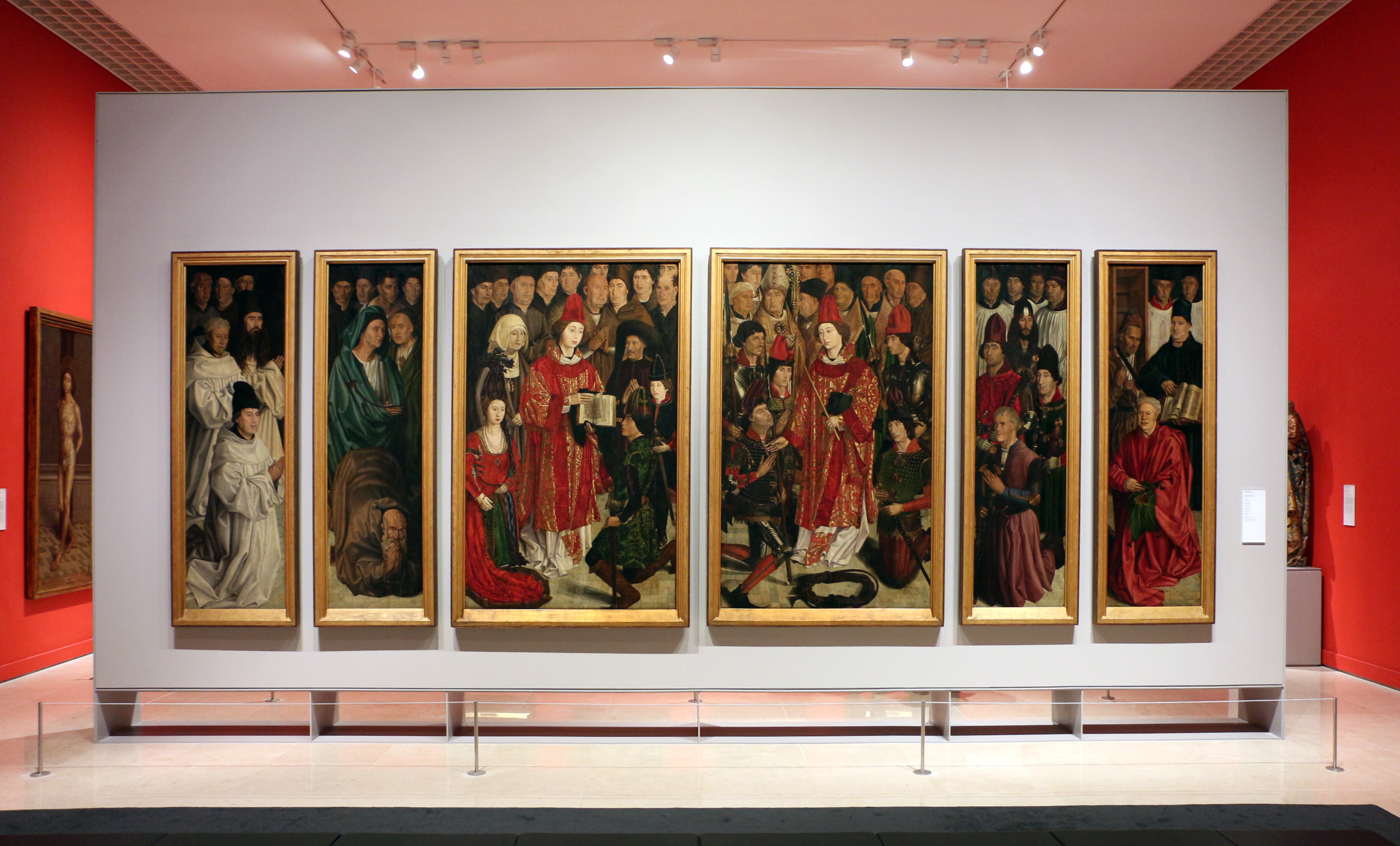
The St, Vincent Panels on display at the National Museum of Ancient Art.

The Saint Vincent Panels are a polyptych perhaps painted between 1450 and 1480, consisting of six panels, depicting fifty-eight people from various groups of Portuguese society at the time, including the royal court. It is a unique "group portrait" in the history of European art. Described as a "solemn and monumental assembly", they are believed to have been painted by the royal painter of King Afonso V, Nuno Gonçalves, who was active from 1450 to 1471, though the full understanding of the intention and the significance behind the work remains a matter of debate. Traditionally, the polyptych is dated to the 1450s due to the inclusion of Prince Henry the Navigator among the persons represented in the panels.

The original polyptych contained "over twelve" panels while it was displayed as a retable in the Lisbon Cathedral, part of an altarpiece dedicated to Saint Vincent, according to a source from 1767. They were displayed in the cathedral at least until 1690 and were set aside in the cathedral until 1742. They were then transferred to the Mitra Palace, where they escaped the devastating earthquake of Lisbon in 1755.

The panels are now housed in the Museu Nacional de Arte Antiga, in Lisbon.

== Rediscovery ==
The panels were rediscovered in store at the monastery of Saint Vicente de Fora in Lisbon, in 1882. They depict scenes associated with the veneration of Saint Vincent of Saragossa. This polyptych consists of six separate panels of oak painted with oil or tempera.

The only reference that art historians can use to support the attribution of the creation of the panels to the painter Gonçalves was written in the 16th century by Francisco de Holanda. The reference mentions a great work of art made by him that is inferred to be these panels. There has also been speculation that the father of Hugo van der Goes collaborated in the painting of the panels, but no firm evidence to support this hypothesis exists. In any case, the Saint Vincent Panels are regarded as the greatest achievement of pre-modern Portuguese art.

Saint Vincent Panels. From left to right: Panel of the Friars, Panel of the Fishermen, Panel of the Prince, Panel of the Archbishop, Panel of the Knights, and Panel of the Relic

== Interpretations ==
Since their discovery in the late 19th century, there has been a continuing dispute over the identity of the painter and the subjects portrayed on the panels. Some basic questions, still unanswered, are these:

- What scene, or scenes, are depicted in the panels?
- Who are the sixty persons portrayed?
- What symbolism is expressed in the panels?
- Who commissioned these panels to be painted?

The majority of experts who have studied this polyptych agree that the panels display several social groups of 15th-century Portugal. They also agree that the children of King John I are represented on these panels, but there is disagreement about their placement and identity.

=== The Panel of the Friars ===
The first panel counting from the left depicts Cistercian monks in white robes typical of the Order. The head of the Order in Portugal was the Abbot of Alcobaça, who was also the royal confessor and royal almoner. The abbot was then Dom Estevão de Aguiar.

=== The Panel of the Fishermen ===
The second panel on the left represents Portugal's interests at sea. A man holding a rosary made of fish vertebrae is prostrated in the foreground, filling the lower third of the composition. His inflamed eyelids indicate blepharitis, a common affliction of sailors. Behind this man stand three fishermen draped in a net with cork floaters, a symbol of their trade. The three are identified as Lançarote de Freitas, Gil Eanes, and Estêvão Afonso, prominent members of Prince Henry's company of Lagos that promoted maritime exploration. The three men beside them are likely Rodrigo Alvares, João Bernaldes, and João Diaz, founders of the same company.

=== Panel of the Prince: alternative hypothesis ===
The third panel - Panel of the Prince

One of the more controversial issues concerning the panels is the depiction of Prince Henry the Navigator. At first glance, the appearance of the man in black in the third panel is quite compatible with traditional conceptions of Prince Henry's likeness: a man with a light moustache and distinctive black round chaperon such as can be found in numerous representations today. However, there are strong reasons to doubt that this is he.

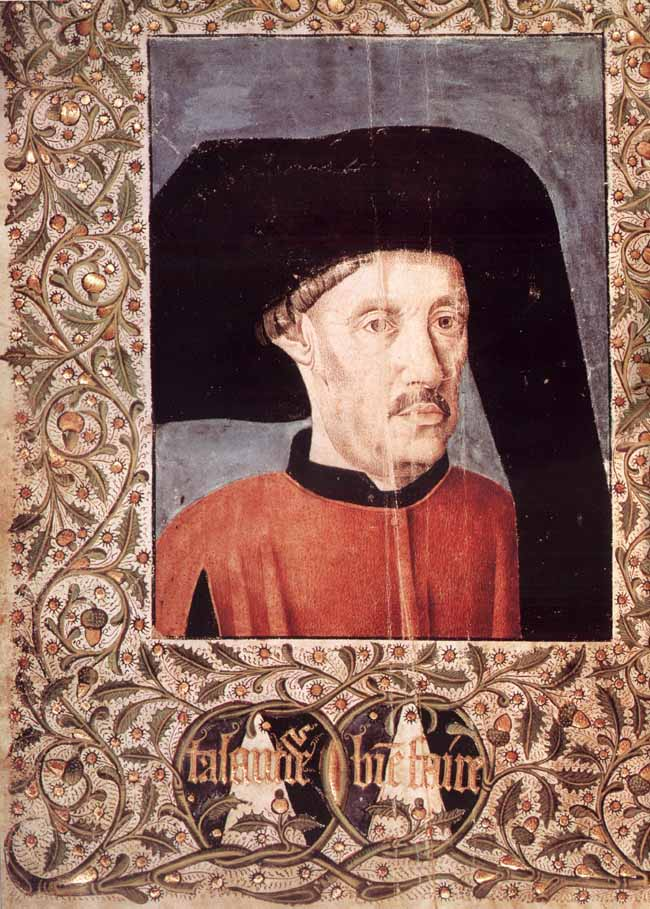
Frontispiece in Zurara's Crónicas dos Feitos de Guiné (Paris codex)

The most basic problem in identifying the man-in-the-chaperon in the Saint Vincent Panels derives from the lack of confirmed portraits of Prince Henry that date from his lifetime. The only other 15th-century image of the man-in-the-chaperon is found in the frontispiece of a copy (currently held by the Bibliothèque nationale de France) of Gomes Eanes de Zurara's Crónicas dos Feitos de Guiné, written in 1453. Zurara's book is an account of the early Portuguese discoveries in Africa along with a hagiography of Prince Henry, to whom the author assigned singular credit for the discoveries. As a result, it has been assumed that the frontispiece depicts Henry, especially since the motto underneath it seems to have been Henry's own.

One alternative hypothesis postulates that the man-in-the-chaperon in Zurara's book might actually be King Edward of Portugal (r. 1431-38), Prince Henry's brother. It has been pointed out that critical phases of the discoveries were launched during his reign, and it would not be unusual for a portrait of a king to adorn a chronicle of events that occurred during his reign.

This alternative hypothesis can be used to help clarify the identity of the figures surrounding St. Vincent in the Panel of the Prince. Specifically, it offers an explanation for the symmetrical arrangement of men and women as pairings of kings and queens. In this interpretation, the standing pair would be King Edward (in a black chaperon), standing at the right and balanced on the left by his wife, Queen Eleanor of Aragon. Below them would be their son, King Afonso V of Portugal, kneeling on the right and facing his consort, Queen Isabella of Coimbra, who is kneeling on the left. The boy in the panel would then be Edward's heir, the future King John II of Portugal.

This alternative hypothesis seems more logical than the original hypothesis that insists on identifying the man-in-the-chaperon as Prince Henry. Since Henry was a bachelor, it is not obvious what woman would be suitable to pair with him as the standing figure on the left. His closest female relatives were his mother Philippa and sister, Isabella, Duchess of Burgundy, both of whom would be more properly paired with their husbands. Moreover, Isabella did not live in Portugal after 1430, thus her lack of involvement with Portuguese society at the time the panel was painted would probably disqualify her from inclusion. If the uncle of a king were to be incorporated in the panel, it would more properly be Peter, Duke of Coimbra, who was once the regent of Afonso V and the father of his bride.

Another interpretation of the figures includes Henry in the panel, but proposes Edward as the kneeling king and Afonso V as the boy. Regardless, all traditional means of explaining Henry's presence in the panel strike one as forced, formulated simply to accommodate a preconceived notion that Henry must be the man-in-the-chaperon. Since Edward was the brother of Henry, it is perfectly possible that he bore a close enough resemblance to Henry that the traditional identification in the Zurara book is perfectly correct, and that Edward's appearance in the panel is only coincidentally similar to what is depicted for Henry in the Zurara book.

The alternative hypothesis with King Edward as the man-in-the-chaperon is more logical; pairs of kings and queens are all that are featured in the panel, with no intrusion from other family members, except for the minor son of one of the royal pairs. Other relatives are featured in a panel of their own (see below). In consideration of this, the Panel of the Prince perhaps ought to be called the Panel of Kings instead, with the king intended to be featured most prominently apparently Afonso V, who was the reigning king of Portugal throughout the floruit of Nuno Gonçalves, thus the most likely candidate as patron for the preparation of the panels.

=== Panel of the Knights: alternative hypothesis ===
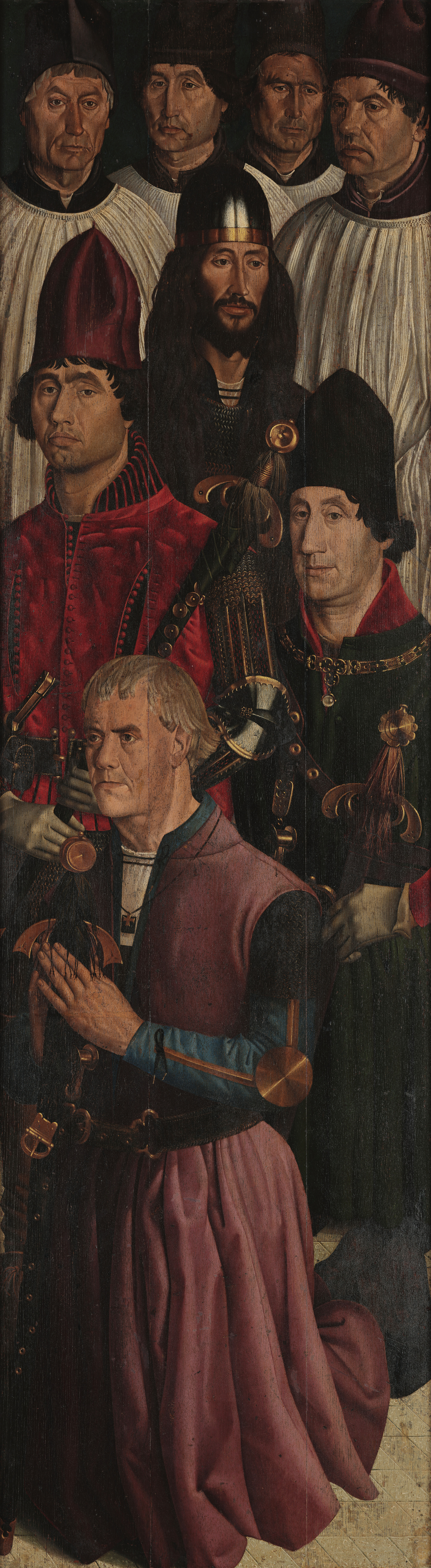
The fifth panel - Panel of the Knights

Hypotheses that assert Henry the Navigator is not the man-in-the-chaperon identify him in another panel: the fifth panel known as the "Panel of the Knights". This alternative interpretation posits that the four knights featured in the panel are the four younger brothers of King Edward of Portugal, as follows:

- On the right is Peter, Duke of Coimbra, who was prince regent during the minority of Afonso V; he is wearing a belt of the Order of the Garter.
- On the left is John of Reguengos, Constable of Portugal, in the red color and blade-holding pose typical of the Order of Saint James of the Sword, of which he was the master.
- On top, helmeted and bearded in black, is Ferdinand the Holy Prince, who died after spending many years as a hostage in a Moroccan prison. His beard, long hair and emaciated face may reflect his long captivity. It is possible that the reflection on his helmet is intended to represent the end of a Moorish prison window or (in conjunction with his beard), a Cross fleury, the badge of the Order of Aviz, of which he was the master.
- Below, kneeling in purple, is Prince Henry the Navigator, master of the Order of Christ, with what seems like that order's cross pendant on his neck and a loose belt of the Order of the Garter. The face of this grey-haired Henry is very different from traditional portrayals.

There has also been much discussion around the possible political significances of this panel. It seems, in particular, that by the poses, this panel aims to humiliate Henry the Navigator, possibly for allying himself with Afonso of Braganza against his full brother Peter, Duke of Coimbra, in the Battle of Alfarrobeira in 1449. These features of the portrait have been noted:

- Henry is on his knees, seemingly begging for forgiveness, while Peter and John seem to "stand guard" over him.
- The pendant Order of Christ cross around Henry's neck is broken.
- Henry's garter belt is untied and disheveled, whereas Peter's is worn properly.
- The pommel of Henry's sword is twisted, dull and draped in black thread, whereas Peter and John's swords are shiny, laced with gold and silver threads.
- Henry's head is penitently uncovered, whereas Peter and John wear the caps of nobles.
- Peter and John are wearing white gloves, perhaps to denote guilt-free "clean hands", whereas Henry is ungloved.
- Henry seems to gaze straight across to another panel, as if he were asking forgiveness from the royal dynasty he had "wronged", whereas Peter and John look at the spectators.

It is worth remarking that the colors chosen for the princes seem to match the liturgical colors of the Roman rite—black (Ferdinand) for mourning of the dead, green (Peter) for ordinary, red (John) for passion and sacrifice and purple (Henry) for penance and mortification.

If this interpretation is valid, then the polyptych of St. Vincent may very well have been conceived by Nuno Gonçalves as a piece of anti-Braganza political propaganda, one possible reason it might have remained hidden for years. It would also set up a terminus post quem for the creation of the panels; they would have to have been painted after 1449 (the date of the Battle of Alfarrobeira). That would tend to support the traditional belief that they date from the 1450s (when passions left over from that conflict would still have been fresh), however if the boy depicted in the Panel of the Prince can be identified as the future King John II (b. 1455), his height and appearance would certainly indicate a child older than five years' old, thus a date in the 1460s would be more likely.

=== Panel of the Relic ===
The foreground of the rightmost panel shows a priest in a large red cloak holding a fragment of a skull in a silken sheath. The priest is Dom Nuno Álvares de Aguiar, who left the Cistercians in 1463 to become the Prior of the Augustinian monastery of Saint Vincent in Lisbon, and later became Bishop of Tangier. The skull is often associated with Saint Vincent but historian Anne Francis argues that the relic is likely the "piece of head" belonging to Saint Anthony, Afonso's patron saint. The coffin and pilgrim in the left of the panel are references to the crusading warrior Henricus. The two priests on the right are the chaplain and attendant of Saint Vincent's chapel.

The identity of the Jewish leader wearing an emblem and holding a book on the right edge of the panel is disputed. One suggestion is Isaac Abrabanel, a scholar on biblical texts and tax-gatherer for Afonso. However, Isaac was 20 c. 1457 and the figure in the panel appears "portly and mature". Other proposed candidates include Jewish astrologers and physicians associated with the royal court, namely Juda Negro, a member of the ibn Yaha family, and Mestre Josepe, who may also appear under the name José Vizinho. The content of the book, opened from back to front in a Hebraic format, is also a matter of controversy. Despite resembling Jewish scripture, the text is not Hebrew but rather Latin. One decipherer claims that the text is an account of the burial of Pedro the Regent, but this reading has been met with skepticism.
