= Guiomar Madalena de Sá e Vilhena =

Portuguese businessperson

Guiomar Madalena de Sá e Vilhena (1705-1789), was a Portuguese businessperson.

She inherited a major shipping company in Madeira from her father and childless brother in 1766 and became an important member of the history of the island, dominating in financial affairs for decades.
