= Michel Guiomar =

French writer and philosopher

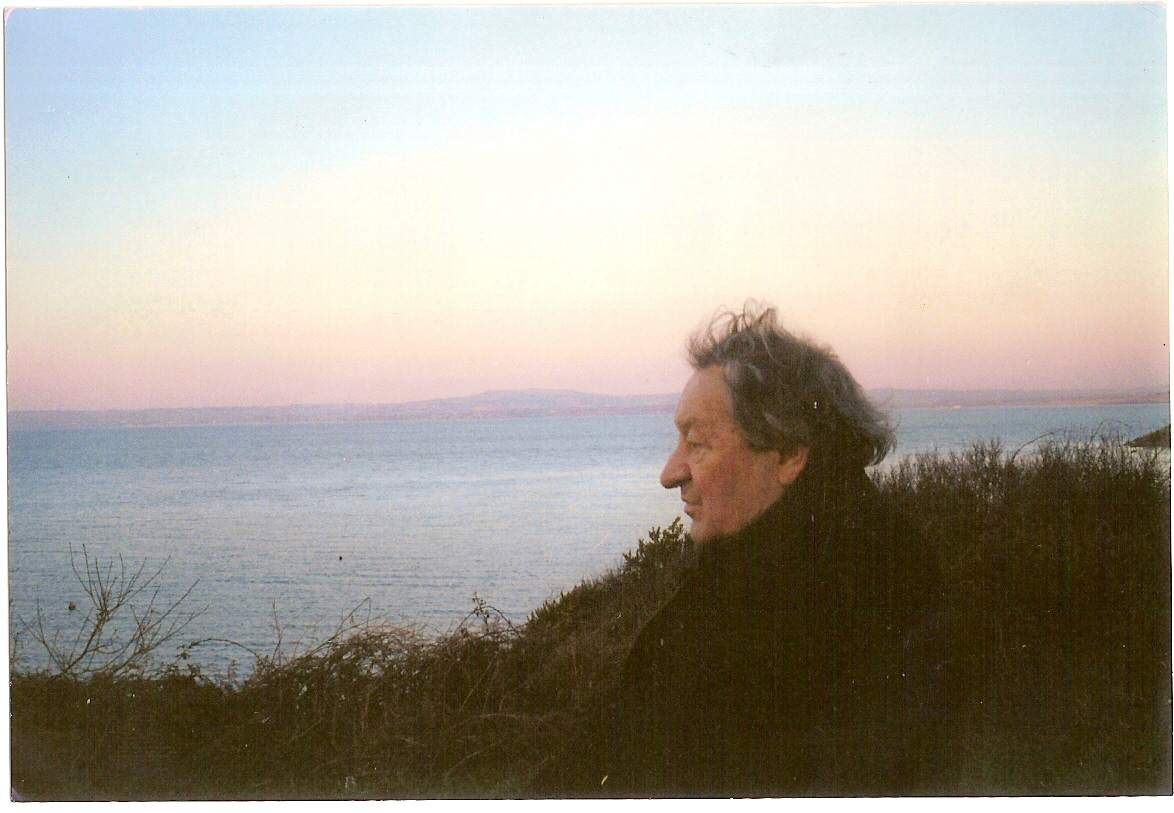
Photo of Michel Guiomar

Michel Guiomar (3 November 1921 – 6 January 2013) was a French writer and philosopher who was a professor emeritus of Aesthetics at the University of Paris IV.

Guiomar was Director of Research in Philosophy and Aesthetics at CNRS before taking the chair in aesthetics at the university.

== Works ==
- Inconscient et imaginaire dans Le Grand Meaulnes, 1964.
- Principes d'une esthétique de la mort, les modes de présences, les présences immédiates, le seuil de l'au-delà, 1967.
- Le masque et le fantasme; l'imagination de la matière sonore dans la pensée musicale de Berlioz, 1970.
- Imaginaire et utopie: études berlioziennes et wagnériennes, 1976.
- Trois paysages du Rivage des Syrtes, 1982
- Miroirs de Ténèbres: images et reflets du double démoniaque, 1984

Vol. I : Julien Gracq: Argol et les rivages de la nuit
V ol. II : Georges Bernanos: Sous le soleil de Satan, ou, les ténèbres de Dieu
Vol. III : Henri Bosco: L'Antiquaire: Nocturnal à l'usage des veilleurs et des ombres
