= Freydal tournament book =

16th-century tournament paintings illuminated manuscript

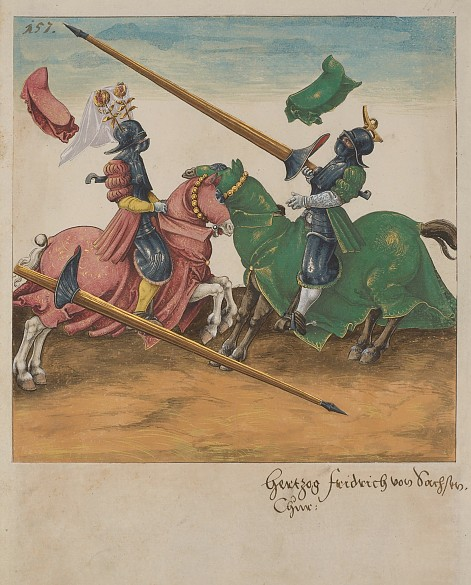
Folio 157 from the Freydal tournament book. Freydal (left) jousts with the Elector of Saxony

The Freydal tournament book is an early 16th century illuminated manuscript held by the Kunsthistorisches Museum in Vienna containing 255 miniature paintings depicting scenes from a series of imaginary late medieval jousting tournaments. It was created by the court painters of the Holy Roman Emperor, Maximilian I with the intention that the miniatures would be used to illustrate one of the Emperor's "memorial" projects, a prose narrative to be called Freydal. The latter work was never completed in the form Maximilian intended, but the tournament book is one of three surviving elements of the project. The other two are a draft text of the narrative and over 200 drawings created as planning sketches for the miniatures in the tournament book.

The miniatures depict Maximilian, in the guise of the story's eponymous hero, Freydal, taking part in 64 tournaments. For each tournament there are two paintings of jousting on horses and one painting of a foot combat, each against actual, mostly named, aristocrats, office-holders and courtiers of Maximilian's time. Eleven types of horseback joust popular at the time are shown in meticulous detail, as well as a wide variety of weapons used in foot combat. A fourth painting for each tournament depicts a "mummery", a courtly masquerade ball held after the day's jousting had been completed. The names of the artists are unknown but, from the quality of many of the paintings some of the finest miniaturists of the time must have been engaged in the work. Originally 256 paintings were created, but one has been lost since at least the 17th century.

Stored in a number of Habsburg palaces since its creation, the tournament book has been held by the Kunsthistorisches Museum since the 1880s. It is notable as the most extensive visual record of late medieval tournaments and court masquerades that exists.

== Background ==
Maximilian I, Holy Roman Emperor from 1508 to his death in 1519, began planning Freydal in 1502. He intended it to be an allegorical romantic account, in text and with illustrations, of the events leading to his marriage to Mary of Burgundy in 1477. It was one of a number of artistic and literary projects intended to immortalize his life and deeds and those of his Habsburg ancestors, and which he referred to as Gedechtnus (or "memorial"). His aim was not only artistic, but to create political propaganda to enhance his public image.

Over the next ten years planning sketches for the entire work were created and Maximilian dictated a partially completed text of the story to his secretary. According to the draft text, the story is an account of a series of 64 tournaments in which Freydal – a young knight and Maximilian's literary alter ego – demonstrates his valour in combat in order to earn honour and fame and to win the hand of a princess. The theme of the story reflects Maximilian's own enthusiasm for jousting. Unusually for a powerful ruler, Maximilian was himself a regular participant in tournaments and continued to take part in jousts until at least 1511, when he was in his 50s. His affinity for jousting contributed to his soubriquet the "last knight".

As part of the project, and to illustrate the narrative, 256 high-quality miniature paintings based on the planning sketches, were created in the form of a tournament book. Tournament books were a feature of late medieval and renaissance courtly culture and provide a graphic record of jousting and its associated rituals. The Freydal illuminated manuscript is considered one of the most important and precious of this genre. It provides an unparalleled pictorial source of jousting from the late medieval period and is the largest surviving tournament book. It is also the only one to depict spectacular falls. In addition to illustrating the jousts themselves, it represents a remarkable catalogue of the weaponry used during tournaments and is the most extensive record of mummery that exists. The Freydal tournament book has been recognised in UNESCO's Memory of the World Programme.

The draft text of the story, which was never completed, has survived but it was never combined with the paintings, as Maximilian had intended, into a single document.

== History ==
The miniature paintings were created between 1512 and 1515 by two dozen anonymous court artists under the direction of the imperial master-taylor. Little is known about the painters, although, from the quality of their work, some of them must have been among the leading miniaturists of their time. Only one painting (folio 116) is signed and then only with the initials "NP". From the painting style, some were part of the Danube school, others show traits of painters from Augsburg or the Low Countries. The miniatures themselves were painted on paper in gouache with gold and silver highlights over pen, pencil and leadpoint with each sheet being 38.2 cm (15.0 in) x 26.8 cm (10.6 in). In total, the sheets cover 13.5 m^{2} (145 sq ft).

After their creation, it is presumed that the manuscript containing the miniatures was stored at Maximilian's palace in Innsbruck. This was the repository for the Emperor's library. It is known that, in the 1570s, his great-grandson Ferdinand II, Archduke of Austria moved it from there, with the rest of the library, to Ambras Castle. The first record of its existence dates to 1596, when it was listed in an estate inventory prepared following Ferdinand's death. At the end of the 17th century, the manuscript was bound in leather and secured with brass clasps.

The manuscript was then on loan to the Imperial Library in Vienna from 1780 to at least 1796. For most of the 19th century, the manuscript was stored, with the rest of the Ambras collection, at the Lower Belvedere Palace in Vienna. However, in the 1880s the Ambras collection, together with the manuscript, was moved to its current home in Vienna's Kunsthistorisches Museum. The manuscript was then given the inventory number KK5073. All but one of the 256 paintings are preserved in the manuscript, with one painting having been lost since at least 1600. In 1992, the manuscript was removed from its binding and the pages separated.

== Content ==
Although the draft text was never combined with the paintings to create a completed work, the tournament book nevertheless mirrors it: 64 tournaments are depicted, with each tournament illustrated by two paintings of horseback jousting, a foot combat painting and a painting of mummery festivities at the end of the day. The miniatures in the tournament book manuscript illustrate the types of jousting popular at the time, both on foot (Note: Jousting does not have to be on horse. Any one-on-one combat can constitute a joust.) and on horse. Freydal features in each illustrated combat and his opponent is usually an historical figure. There is evidence that Maximilian actually jousted with some of these individuals. Each picture, in the lower margin, identifies the name of the opponent and the other courtiers depicted. The three most prominent opponents in the tournament book are Philipp von Rechberg and Wolfgang von Polheim, both of whom are depicted in jousts eleven times, and Anton von Yfan, Baron of Ivano, (whose actual name was Antonio de Caldonazzo) who is depicted eight times.

=== Jousting on horses ===
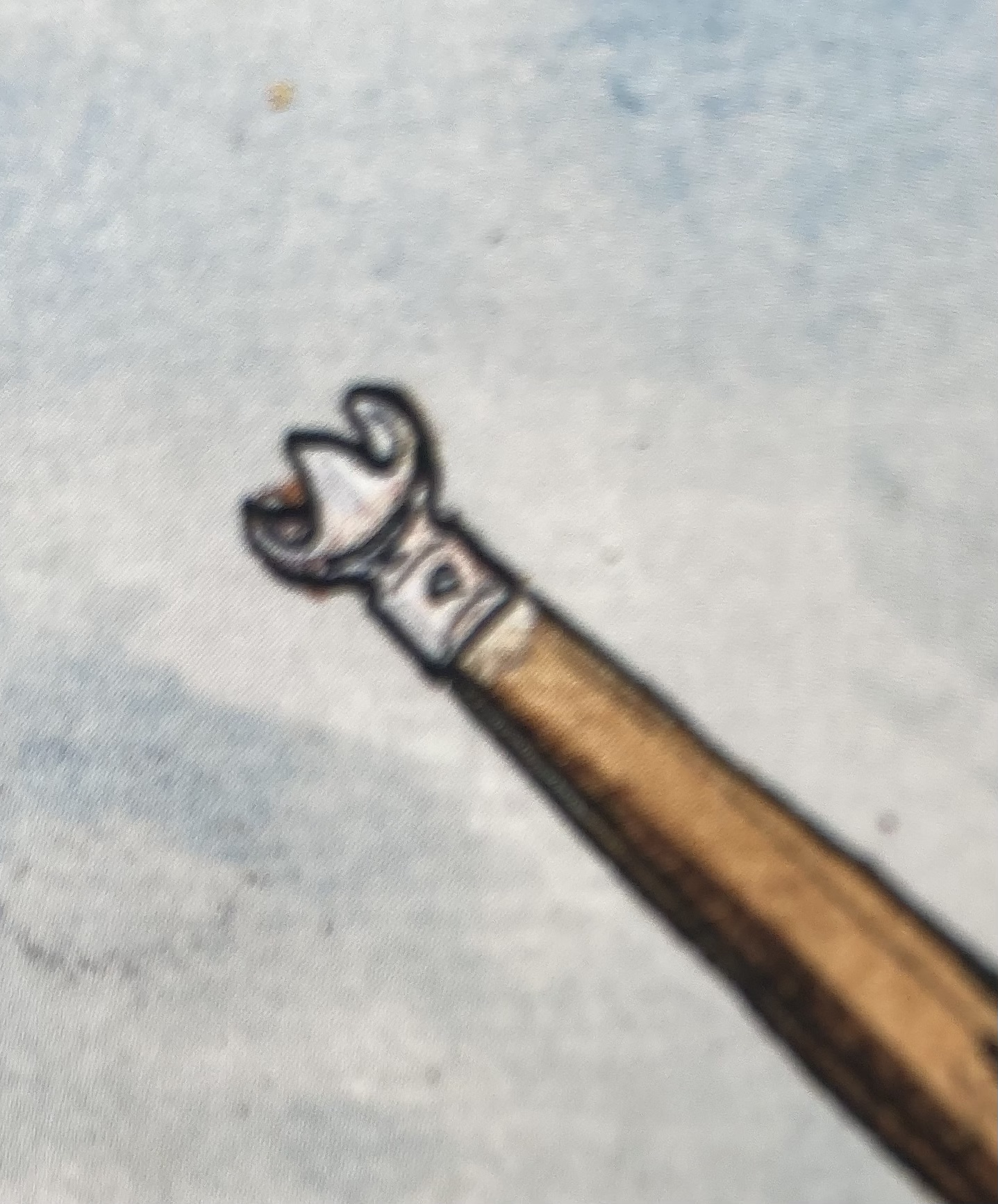
The blunted three-pronged lance tip used in a Stechen joust, in this case an Italian joust of peace. From fol. 46 of the Freydal tournament book

Two types of jousting on horses – Rennen and Stechen – are depicted for each tournament. Rennen, or “jousts of war”, are where the lance has a sharpened tip. Stechen, or “jousts of peace”, are where the lance is blunted with a "coronel" tip (in German, Krönig or Krönlein), meaning that, instead of a sharpened tip, the tip is shaped in the form of a cup made of a three pronged crown.

Within these two broad groupings, eleven sub-types are shown:

==== Stechen ====
- Welsches Gestech (Italian joust of peace). A board (or "tilt") separates the jousters so that they can ride more closely to each other and strike their opponent frontally with greater force. This results in a spectacular splintering of the lances. Although the rider's legs were protected from his opponent by the barrier, leg armour was worn to protect the knees from colliding with it as they rode so close to the tilt.
- Deutsches Gestech (German joust of peace). This differed from the Welsches Gestech in that there was no barrier ("tilt") and leg armour was not worn. The rider's legs had no need for leg armour as his legs were protected by a Stechkissen, a large stuffed u-shaped cushion hanging from the horse's neck.
- Gestech im Hohen Zeug (Joust of peace with high saddles). This was, by Maximilian's time, an out-dated form of joust, which he tried to revive. The riders, who were not separated by a barrier, were enclosed in high saddles which meant that it was virtually impossible for them to be unseated. The objective was to split the lance of the opponent. No leg armour was worn as the rider's legs were protected by the saddle structure.
- Gestech im Beinharnisch (Joust of peace in leg armour). There was no barrier between the riders. But in contrast to the Deutsches Gestech (and the Gestech im Hohen Zeug) leg armour was worn as this provided the only protection for the rider's legs. Like the Gestech im Hohen Zeug, this was by Maximilian's time an out-dated type of joust.

==== Rennen ====
- Scharfrennen (Joust of war with "flying" shields). The shield is shown loosely fixed to the rider's breastplate, the aim being to dislodge it.
- Anzogenrennen (Joust of war with fixed shields) The aim is to unseat the opponent and his shield is fixed to his armour.
- Geschiftscheiben-Rennen (Joust of war with "exploding" shields). The aim is to strike a large roundel shield on the chest of the other rider. If the strike is correctly made, a complicated spring mechanism ejects into the air triangular metal segments attached to the surface of the shield.
- Bundrennen (Joust of war with "flying" shields without bevors). One of the most spectacular jousts depicted. The shield is held in place on the rider's breastplate with a complicated spring mechanism and when it is struck in the right place by the opponent the whole shield is ejected high into the air.
- Geschifttartschen-Rennen (Joust of war with "flying" and "exploding" shields). This combines the Bundrennen with the Geschiftscheiben-Rennen. The spectacle of the Bundrennen is increased by attaching multiple triangular platelets to the shield which, when the shield is ejected, come loose and explode into the air like a firework display. Maximilian claimed to have invented this type of joust.
- Feldrennen (Joust of war in reinforced field armour). This type of joust replicates skirmishes in war and the riders wear lighter battlefield armour, reinforced at the chin, chest and left shoulder. It was a two course joust, where the riders jousted with lances in the first course. Unlike other types of joust, for this course, they did not ride at each other in a pre-agreed straight line but, instead, roamed over an open field and charged at will. In the second course, the lances and reinforced parts of the armour are disguarded and the combat continues with swords.
- Krönlrennen (Mixed joust of war and joust of peace). One rider wears the armour of a joust of peace but wields the lance of a joust of war and the other rider has the opposite combination.

=== Foot jousting ===
In each of the tournaments, the participants are shown engaging in a foot combat. A variety of weapons are used, including iron clubs (Eisenkolben), flails (Drischel), swords (Turnierschwert) and daggers. With one exception (folio 51), all the foot combat miniatures were painted by the same anonymous artist.

=== Mummeries ===
After each of the sixty-four tournaments is a scene depicting a moresca (a pantomime dance) or other post-tournament festivities with male courtiers, including the knights who had competed in the tournament, dressing up to dance in a variety of exotic costumes. Known as ‘mummeries’, these were a regular feature of the evening entertainment after tournaments. Although the illustrations usually depict dances — either row or circle dancing — sometimes other types of mummeries are shown, such as burlesques of little known court ceremonies, prize-givings and mock battles, for example a pike battle between peasants and Landsknechte.

== List of miniatures ==
The following is a list of the 255 miniature paintings contained in the Freydal tournament book. The first column identifies each miniature's folio number, the unique consecutive number added in manuscript to the top left and bottom right corners of each painting in the 17th century. Freydal is present in each image shown. In the jousting paintings, he is one of the two jousters depicted. In the mummery paintings, he is the masked figure holding a torch and often standing slightly apart from the revellers. The "Image description" column identifies Freydal's opponent in each joust and notable named participants, other than Freydal, at each mummery, in both cases as stated in the manuscript. The last column indicates the page number in Taschen's reproduction of the miniatures published in 2019, and edited by Stefan Krause, which is the source for the information on each miniature in the list (except where another source is referenced by a citation).

=== Folios 1-64 (Tournaments 1-16) ===
fol.	Image	Tournament and activity	Image description	Ref.
1		Tournament 1 Rennen	Scharfrennen (Joust of war with "flying" shields) against Christoph Schenk von Limburg. See fol. 145	pp. 54–55
2		Tournament 1 Stechen	Welsches Gestech (Italian joust of peace) against Count Engelbert II of Nassau (1451-1504), Lord of Breda, and a Burgundian diplomat. Freydal's helmet has a sun crest and his horse bears a unicorn horn on its shaffron	p. 56
3		Tournament 1 Foot joust	Combat with glaives with an opponent noted as "Leonhart Rueshaimer"	p. 57
4		Tournament 1 Mummery	Masquerade where the dancers include Wilhelm von Roggendorf (1481-1541), a high-ranking diplomat and Habsburg military commander, and three other named courtiers	pp. 58–59
5		Tournament 2 Rennen	Geschifttartschen-Rennen (Joust of war with flying and exploding shields) with Anton von Yfan. Von Yfan here wears a helmet with donkey ears.	pp. 60–61
6		Tournament 2 Rennen	Krönlrennen (Mixed joust of war and joust of peace) with Count Felix von Werdenberg-Sargans (d.1530), a military commander and courtier. Maximilian's aunt, Catherine of Austria, was his grandmother.	p. 62
7		Tournament 2 Foot joust	Combat with halberds with Leonhard Vetter (in the red surcoat), a member of the aristocratic Vötter von der Lillie family, who had estates in Moravia and Styria.	p. 63
8		Tournament 2 Mummery	The revellers wear Italian costumes. Those present include Erhard von Polheim und Liebnitz, Wilhelm Scurrff Jörg von Harras and Maximillian's seneschal and lifelong friend Melchior von Massmünster.	pp. 64–65
9		Tournament 3 Rennen	Anzogenrennen (Joust of war with fixed shields) with Sigmund von Welsperg (d.1503), Maximilian's chamberlain, who is unhorsed.	pp. 66–67
10		Tournament 3 Stechen	Deutsches Gestech (German joust of peace) with Count Eitel-Frederick II von Hohenzollern (1452-1512), who was one of Maximilian's closest friends. He was also one of the band of nobles who helped Maximilian escape from Bruges during the Flemish Revolt of 1487-1492. Here, he has a ram's horns crest.	p. 68
11		Tournament 3 Foot joust	Combat with swords and bucklers with Mathias Vetter. A buckler was a small fencing shield	p. 69
12		Tournament 3 Mummery	The dancers are dressed in Spanish costumes. They include Siegmund von Dietrichstein (1480-1533), a close associate of Maximilian.	p. 70
13		Tournament 4 Rennen	Feldrenen with lances (Joust of war in reinforced armour) against an unnamed knight (on the left), who bears the emblems of the Order of the Golden Fleece.	pp. 72–73
14		Tournament 4 Stechen	Welsches Gestech (Italian joust of peace, with tilt) against "Der Teufl". This is a member of the Teufel family, and his helmet is in the shape of a monster with a sharp beak.	p. 74
15		Tournament 4 Foot joust	Combat with halberds with Count Engelbert II of Nassau	p. 75
16		Tournament 4 Mummery	The dancers include the Austrian aristocrats Wilhelm von Wolfenreut (d.1520) and Heinrich Elacher. The latter was brought up with Maximilian when he was in his pre-teens.	pp. 76–77
17		Tournament 5 Rennen	Anzogenrennen (Joust of war with fixed shields) against Count Wolfgang I von Fürstenberg (1465-1509), who is unhorsed. Fürstenberg held a number of important positions in Maximilian's court.	pp. 78–79
18		Tournament 5 Stechen	Welsches Gestech (Italian joust of peace, with tilt) against Lord Jan III van Bergen op Zoom (1452-1531), who held a number of important posts in Namur during both Maximilian's reign and that of Charles V	p. 80
19		Tournament 5 Foot joust	Combat with swords, throwing stars and shields with Count Albert von Hohenzollern, brother of Eitel-Frederick II (see folio 10 above). Albert died taking part in Maximilian's attack on Utrecht in 1483	p. 81
20		Tournament 5 Mummery	The dancers wear the colours chosen for Freydal by 3 princesses at the beginning of the draft text narrative. The dancers include Jörg von Liechtenstein-Carneid, commander of the army of the Swabian League and Volkart von Auersperg. Two members of the House of Auersperg bore this name at the time. One of them was brought up with Maximilian in the 1460s.	p. 82-83, 159
21		Tournament 6 Rennen	Bundrennen (Joust of war with "flying" shields without bevors) against Count Hoyer VI von Mansfeld (1482-1540), an imperial councillor, who has a helmet crest of stag antlers and flowers.	pp. 84–85
22		Tournament 6 Stechen	Deutsches Gestech (German joust of peace) against Hans Teschitz, a Croatian courtier who was Maximilian's equerry.	p. 86
23		Tournament 6 Foot joust	Combat with awl pikes (see fol. 147) against Wolfgang von Polheim.	p. 87
24		Tournament 6 Mummery	The revellers taking part in a circle dance, include members of the Losenstein, Schiffer and Tschermembl families. Mathias von Liechtenstein, who was brought up with Maximilian, also features in the scene.	pp. 88–90
25		Tournament 7 Rennen	Bundrennen (Joust of war with "flying" shields without bevors) against Philipp von Rechberg (see fol. 200) who is the knight lying on the right with donkey ears as a helmet crest. This is one of the few paintings of a joust in the tournament book with a background scene featuring other characters beside the two jousting knights.	pp. 90–91
26		Tournament 7 Stechen	Welsches Gestech (Italian joust of peace) against Michel van Bergen (in red) whose helmet crest is a fig sign, an obscene gesture which equates, in modern terms, to giving the finger. Michel van Bergen was killed during a siege of Huy near Liège in 1482. His brother featured in fol.18.	p. 92
27		Tournament 7 Foot joust	Combat with glaives against the Burgundian aristocrat, Philip of Cleves, Lord of Ravenstein (1456-1528). Although for most of his life he supported the Habsburgs, he rebelled against Maximilian in the late 1480s.	p. 93
28		Tournament 7 Mummery	The dancers at this masquerade are dressed as hunters and include members of the Lowenstein, Oeder, Zelking, and Painer noble families.	pp. 94–95
29		Tournament 8 Rennen	Geschifttartschen-Rennen (Joust of war with "flying" and "exploding" shields) against Sigmund von Welsperg (see fol. 9)	pp. 96–97
30		Tournament 8 Stechen	Welsches Gestech (Italian joust of peace) against Friedrich von Horn. Freydal wears a helmet crest of antlers.	p. 98
31		Tournament 8 Foot joust	Combat with long swords against Wilhelm Knöringen, of a Swabian noble family.	p. 99
32		Tournament 8 Mummery	The dancers include a member of the Trautmansdorff noble family.	pp. 100–101
33		Tournament 9 Rennen	Scharfrennen (Joust of war with "flying" shields) with Philipp von Rechberg (see fol.200)	pp. 102–103
34		Tournament 9 Stechen	Deutsches Gestech (German joust of war) against Wolfgang von Polheim	p. 104
35		Tournament 9 Foot joust	Combat with flails against Georg von Montfort (see fol.81).	p. 105
36		Tournament 9 Mummery	This painting depicts a moresca, a dance where the male dancers attempt to impress the watching ladies with wild jumps and twists.	pp. 106–107
37		Tournament 10 Rennen	Anzogenrennen (Joust of war with fixed shields) with Christopher I, Margrave of Baden (1453 - 1527), who is the rider on the ground obscured by his horse.	pp. 108–109
38		Tournament 10 Stechen	Welsches Gestech (Italian joust of peace) against Franciscus de Montibus, ambassador of the king of Naples, who has been unhorsed. Franciscus de Montibus is recorded as jousting with Maximilian several times in March 1498.	p. 110
39		Tournament 10 Foot joust	Combat with maces (war hammers) and targes (small shields) against Claude de Vaudry (died 1515), Burgundian nobleman who had served Charles the Bold. There is a record of Maximilian jousting against Claude de Vaudry in 1495	p. 111
40		Tournament 10 Mummery	A masquerade in which the named participants includes a Jacob van Castel. Someone of that name was a courtier in the time of Maximilian's father, Frederick III. He was part of the entourage that greeted Maximilian's mother, Eleanor of Portugal, when she first arrived from her homeland.	pp. 112–113
41		Tournament 11 Rennen	Geschiftscheiben-Rennen (Joust of war with "exploding" shields) against an unnamed opponent. This is the only image in the tournament book of this type of Rennen	pp. 114–115
42		Tournament 11 Stechen	Deutsches Gestech (German joust of war) against Philipp von Rechberg (see fol.200).	p. 116
43		Tournament 11 Foot joust	Combat with halberds against Anton von Yfan	p. 117
44		Tournament 11 Mummery	This masquerade included Anton vom Ross (Antonio Cavalli) who was a mineowner and the financial administrator of the Tyrol. The limited relaxation of strict court etiquette during masquerades allowed for an element of greater interaction amongst courtiers of different social standing.	pp. 118–119
45		Tournament 12 Rennen	Geschifttartschen-Rennen (Joust of war with "flying" and "exploding" shields) against Anton von Yfan. Maximilian is recorded jousting with von Yfan at Innsbruck in 1498.	pp. 120–121
46		Tournament 12 Stechen	Welsches Gestech (Italian joust of peace) against Hanns von Reichenberg (died 1522).	p. 122
47		Tournament 12 Foot joust	Combat with pikes against a member of the Turisan family from Tyrol-Trentino	p. 123
48		Tournament 12 Mummery	The colours of the participants in this painting are the colours of the Order of the Golden Fleece. The dancers are all members of aristocratic families from Austria, Alsace and Slovenia.	pp. 124–125
49		Tournament 13 Stechen	Deutsches Gestech (German joust of peace) with Veit von Wolkenstein (see fol.133). Freydal (on the left) wears the headress of a lady of the Burgundian court, in reference to Maximilian's wife Mary of Burgundy.	pp. 126–127
50		Tournament 13 Rennen	Anzogenrennen (Joust of war with fixed shields) against Sigmund von Welsperg (see fol.9)	p. 128
51		Tournament 13 Foot joust	Combat with awl pikes against Baron Georg of Castelbarco and Castelcorno, who was a commander in Maximilian's war in Hungary in the 1490s.	p. 129
52		Tournament 13 Mummery	This is an unusual mummery depiction in that instead of a dance, the masquerade is a prize-giving ceremony out of doors. The judges are in the guise of a king and queen. Participants include Friedrich von Stubenberg, another childhood friend of Maximilian's	pp. 130–131
53		Tournament 14 Stechen	Welsches Gestech (Italian joust of peace) against Hanns Reinwald, who is in the foreground in green.	pp. 132–133
54		Tournament 14 Rennen	Anzogenrennen (Joust of war with fixed shields) against Christoph von Lamberg. A nobleman from a long-standing Slovenian family, von Lamberg loyally served both Maximilian and his father.	p. 134
55		Tournament 14 Foot joust	Combat with pikes against Count Melchior von Mühlingen and Barby (1493-1519). He served as Rector of the University of Wittenberg.	p. 135
56		Tournament 14 Mummery	The participants in this masquerade include members of the aristocratic families of Altenhauser from Styria, Goldaker from Carinthia and Scherffenberg from Carniola.	pp. 136–137
57		Tournament 15 Stechen	Deutsches Gestech (German joust of peace) against Count Friedrich von Öttingen believed to be the same person of that name who became bishop of Passau in 1485	pp. 138–139
58		Tournament 15 Rennen	Anzogenrennen (Joust of war with fixed shields) against Wolfgang von Fürstenberg (see fol.17)	p. 140
59		Tournament 15 Foot joust	Combat with long swords against a member of the Swabian Erolzheim family, several of whom served the Habsburgs in the late 15th century.	p. 141
60		Tournament 15 Mummery	The dancers include Wolfgang von Dietrichstein, cousin of the Dietrichstein in fol.12.	pp. 142–143
61		Tournament 16 Stechen	Deutsches Gestech (German joust of peace) against Balthasar von Roggendorf in yellow and gold on the left. He was another of the noblemen brought up with Maximilian and was the uncle of Wilhelm von Roggendorf in fol.4.	pp. 144–145
62		Tournament 16 Rennen	Bundrennen (Joust of war with "flying" shields and without bevors) against Wolfgang von Polheim. Von Polheim is in the right.	p. 146
63		Tournament 16 Foot joust	Combat with maces and targes against Maximilian's childhood friend Melchior von Massmünster (see fol.8)	p. 147
64		Tournament 16 Mummery	In this dance the male revellers wear women's clothes. Cross-dressing in this way in late medieval masquerades has been recorded multiple times. The dancers are all members of the high nobility: the Windisch-Graetz, Liechtenstein and Dietrichstein families.	pp. 145–146

=== Folios 65-128 (Tournaments 17-32) ===
fol.	Image	Tournament and activity	Image description	Ref.
65		Tournament 17 Stechen	Deutsches Gestech (German joust of peace) against Christoph II von Mindorf, who was an imperial councillor and Feldzeugmeister in Lower Austria.	pp. 150–151
66		Tournament 17 Rennen	Geschifttartschen-Rennen Joust of war with "flying" and "exploding" shields against Wolfgang von Polheim, who had journeyed with Maximilian to Ghent in 1477 to first meet Mary of Burgundy.	p. 152
67		Tournament 17 Foot joust	Combat with poles against Johann IV von Königsberg, Lord of Thomasberg, who held a position in the Habsburg Hofgericht (the court of justice in Wiener Neustadt).	p. 153
68		Tournament 17 Mummery	Here the dancers are dressed as Italian merchants.	pp. 154–155
69		Tournament 18 Stechen	Deutsches Gestech (German joust of peace) against Hans Teschitz (see fol.22)	pp. 156–157
70		Tournament 18 Rennen	Scharfrennen (Joust of war with "flying" shields) against Sigmund von Welsperg, on the left.	p. 158
71		Tournament 18 Foot joust	Combat with halberds against Volkart von Auersperg (see fol.20)	p. 159
72		Tournament 18 Mummery	The dancers wear Burgundian dress and include Cyriak von Polheim son of Wolfgang von Polheim	pp. 160–161
73		Tournament 19 Rennen	Bundrennen (Joust of war with "flying" shields without bevors) against Philipp von Rechberg (see fol.200). Bevors are iron plates that normally protect the jousters chin. This image shows the iron framework on the chest and neck that replaces the bevor and enables the shield to slide over the face to be thrown in the air.	pp. 162–163
74		Tournament 19 Stechen	Deutsches Gestech against Philipp von Rechberg (see fol.200) on the left. Freydal wears an archducal hat	p. 164
75		Tournament 19 Foot joust	Combat with maces and targes against Sigmund Stödl. Freydal, in gold, has the doubled-headed eagle of the Holy Roman Empire on his shield.	p. 165
76		Tournament 19 Mummery	The dancers come from a number of named Austrian noble families including the Hollenburgers and Rosegkers.	pp. 166–167
77		Tournament 20 Rennen	Scharfrennen (Joust of war with "flying" shields) against Wolfgang Seissenecker, Lord of Persenbeug, on the left.	pp. 168–169
78		Tournament 20 Stechen	Deutsches Gestech (German joust of peace) against Caspar von Parkhaim, who has been unhorsed. Von Parkhaim figures in the records as part of Maximilian's entourage when he was in Bruges in 1477.	p. 170
79		Tournament 20 Foot joust	Combat with daggers with Andreas von Kolnitz, a Carinthian noble, who was imprisoned in 1484 by Maximilian's father, Frederick III, in a dispute about a number of von Kolnitz's castles.	p. 171
80		Tournament 20 Mummery	The dancers include Anton Schenk, a courtier of the Habsburg Archduke Sigismund of Tyrol, and members of the Trapp and Payrsberg noble families, all with connections to the Tyrol. They wear Italian costumes.	pp. 172–173
81		Tournament 21 Rennen	Feldrennen (Joust of war in reinforced field armour) against Count Georg III von Montfort-Bregenz-Pfannberg (c.1475/80-1544)	pp. 174–175
82		Tournament 21 Stechen	Welsches Gestech (Italian joust of peace) against Jacob de Heere (d.1488), mayor of Bruges in 1485.	p. 176
83		Tournament 21 Foot joust	Combat with Flails with Wilhelm Auer (see fol.234)	p. 177
84		Tournament 21 Mummery	The dancers are wearing the distinctive white jackets and hoods, and yellow aprons, of miners. Maximilian's domains included the mines of Schwaz which were one of the richest sources of silver and copper at the time.	pp. 178–179
85		Tournament 22 Rennen	Feldrennen (Joust of war in reinforced field armour) against Philip of Cleves, Lord of Ravenstein, on the left. Freydal wears what appears to be a bridal veil in reference to Maximilian's two marriages: to Mary of Burgundy in 1477 and to Bianca Maria Sforza in 1494.	pp. 180–181
86		Tournament 22 Rennen	Krönlrennen (Mixed joust of war and joust of peace) with Wolfgang von Polheim.	p. 182
87		Tournament 22 Foot joust	Combat with daggers against someone named "Lornay". This is likely to be a member of the Flemish noble de Lannoy family.	p. 183
88		Tournament 22 Mummery	The dancers wear Italian costumes and include members of the aristocracy from Vorarlberg, the Low Countries, and Austria.	pp. 184–185
89		Tournament 23 Rennen	Anzogrennen (Joust of war with fixed shields) with Wolfgang von Polheim. Records indicate that Maximilian and von Polheim jousted at least 15 times.	pp. 186–187
90		Tournament 23 Stechen	Deutsches Gestech (German joust of peace) against Thomas von Frundsberg (died 1497), on the left. Von Frundsberg had been in the service of both Sigismund, Archduke of Austria and Maximilian.	p. 188
91		Tournament 23 Foot joust	Combat with Flails with Jörg Harder of an aristocratic family from Styria. Harder, like many of the jousters, was brought up with Maximilian and they were childhood friends.	p. 189
92		Tournament 23 Mummery	The dancers wear Hungarian costumes and bird-like masques and from aristocratic families from Austria, Slovenia and the Rhineland	pp. 190–191
93		Tournament 24 Rennen	Bundrennen (Joust of war with "flying" shields and without bevors) against Philipp von Rechberg (see fol.200), on the right. Freydal's crest is a large letter "M", for Maximilian, and von Rechberg similarly wears a helmet with the letter "R" on each side.	pp. 192–193
94		Tournament 24 Stechen	Deutsches Gestech (German joust of peace) against Count Ulrich von Werdenberg-Sargans zu Trochttelfingen. He was the uncle of Felix and Johann von Werdenberg (in folios 6 and 98 respectively).	p. 194
95		Tournament 24 Foot joust	Combat with swords with Erasmus Lueger (1420-1484), a noble from Carniola who became an enemy of the Habsburgs after murdering an Austrian courtier and siding with Mathias Corvinus, king of Hungary, during his invasion of Habsburg lands in the 1470s and 1480s.	p. 195
96		Tournament 24 Mummery	The dancers wear Burgundian costume and include nobles from the Hermanstainer, Gloyach and Mindorf families.	pp. 196–197
97		Tournament 25 Rennen	Anzogenrennen (Joust of war with fixed shields) against Niclas von Firmian (died 1509), a governor of Maximilian's lands in the western part of south Tyrol.	pp. 198–199
98		Tournament 25 Stechen	Gestech im Hohen Zeug (Joust of peace in high saddles) against Count Johann von Werdenberg-Sargans zu Trochttelfingen, brother of Felix (see fol.6). Freydal is on the left.	p. 200
99		Tournament 25 Foot joust	Combat with pikes and bucklers against Baron Kaspar von Lamberg	p. 201
100		Tournament 25 Mummery	The dancers include a number of nobles from families with estates in Tyrol and Styria. One of the ladies (far right) wears a Burgundian headress in reference to Maximilian's first wife Mary of Burgundy.	pp. 202–203
101		Tournament 26 Rennen	Scharfrennen (Joust of war with "flying" shields) against Anton von Yfan on the right.	pp. 204–205
102		Tournament 26 Stechen	Deutsches Gestech (German joust of peace) against Leonhard Vetter (see fol.7)	p. 206
103		Tournament 26 Foot joust	Combat with halberds with Hanns Oberhaimer.	p. 207
104		Tournament 26 Mummery	The dancers in this masquerade are from noble families across Germany and northern Italy, including Neuhauser, Thurn, Freyberger and Rauber.	pp. 208–209
105		Tournament 27 Rennen	Anzogenrennen (Joust of war with fixed shields) against Anton von Yfan who is on the left. The anonymous miniaturist who painted this scene is considered one of the best to work on Freydal. His other works include fols. 29, 113, and 252.	pp. 210–211
106		Tournament 27 Stechen	Gestech im Beinharnisch (Joust of peace in leg armour) against Sigmund von Hardeck (see fol.150)	p. 212
107		Tournament 27 Foot joust	Combat with long swords against Wernher Raunacher who held the office of Pfleger of Senosetsch.	p. 213
108		Tournament 27 Mummery	A masquerade with nobles from the Hermannstein family of Hesse and the family of the Barons of Prösing from Celje.	pp. 214–215
109		Tournament 28 Rennen	Feldrennen (Joust of war in reinforced field armour) against the prominent Burgundian commander Charles I de Croÿ, Prince of Chimay (1455-1527).	pp. 216–217
110		Tournament 28 Stechen	Deutsches Gestech (German joust of peace) against "Der von Mörs" which is believed to be a reference to Count Vincenz von Moers (c.1410-1499) a military commander from the lower Rhine.	p. 218
111		Tournament 28 Foot joust	Combat with falchions against Hans Teschitz (see fol.22).	p. 219
112		Tournament 28 Mummery	The revellers wear Italian costomes and dance a circle dance.	p. 220
113		Tournament 29 Rennen	Geschifttartschen-Rennen (Joust of war with 'flying' and 'exploding' shields) against Count Wolfgang von Fürstenberg (see fol.17)	pp. 222–223
114		Tournament 29 Stechen	Welsches Gestech (Italian Joust of Peace) against Count Johann III von Isenburg zu Büdingen (1476-1533)	p. 224
115		Tournament 29 Foot joust	Combat with swords and bucklers with Jacob Silbercamerer, who was a Seneschal appointed by Maximilian.	p. 225
116		Tournament 29 Mummery	In this scene Landsknechts stage a re-enactment of a skirmish.	pp. 226–227
117		Tournament 30 Rennen	Feldrennen (Joust of war in reinforced field armour) against an unnamed knight. This is the first course of the Feldrennen using lances. The second course is shown in fol. 149	pp. 228–229
118		Tournament 30 Stechen	Welsches Gestech (Italian joust of peace) against Scharl von Wiauin who is in the foreground with a green wreath as a crest. Freydal's crest includes golden ibex horns. A compositional error results in Wiauin appearing to fall from his horse as though he were riding backwards.	p. 230
119		Tournament 30 Foot joust	Combat with long swords against Adrian Mamolt. Two fencing moves first devised by 14th century fencing master Johannes Liechtenauer are illustrated: the Hut Ochs (left) and Hut Pflug	p. 231
120		Tournament 30 Mummery	Maximilian's coat of arms are shown on the balcony and the Emblem of Austria is shown on the drum of the musician.	p. 232
121		Tournament 31 Rennen	Geschifttartschen-Rennen (Joust of war with'flying' and 'exploding' shields) against Sigmund von Welsperg (see fol.9). The three wheels on the breastplates of the jousters, which form part of the mechanism that flings the shields in the air, are visible.	pp. 234–235
122		Tournament 31 Stechen	Welsches Gestech (Italian joust of peace) against Duke Henry V of Mecklenburg-Schwerin (in red) whose lance has shattered into three pieces, indicating that Freydal has hit his shield dead centre without glancing off.	p. 236
123		Tournament 31 Foot joust	Combat with poles against an opponent noted as "Guelam Helffant"	p. 237
124		Tournament 31 Mummery	The dancers wear puffed slieves which were particularly fashionable when the mniatures were painted (in the 1510s).	p. 238-239
125		Tournament 32 Rennen	Scharfrennen (Joust of war with "flying" shields) against Count Johann von Montfort-Tettnang (d.1529) who, at a tournament at Innsbruck in 1498, is recorded as jousting with Maximilian. This painting is unusual in showing an additional figure: a running landsknecht	pp. 240–241
126		Tournament 32 Gestech	Deutsches Gestech (German joust of peace) against Wolfgang von Polheim who wears a crest with two red hearts.	p. 242
127		Tournament 32 Foot joust	Combat with daggers against Lancelot de Bréville who is a nobleman from Normandy.	p. 243
128		Tournament 32 Mummery	Here the dancers wear Italian costumes. In the background is an elaborate cloth-of-gold hanging, in front of which the male courtiers are asking the ladies to dance.	pp. 244–245

=== Folios 129-191 (Tournaments 33-48) ===
fol.	Image	Tournament and activity	Image description	Ref.
129		Tournament 33 Rennen	Scharfrennen (Joust of war with "flying" shields) against Anton von Yfan who is unhorsed.	pp. 146–147
130		Tournament 33 Stechen	Welsches Gestech (Italian joust of peace) against Frederick II of Bavaria (later Elector Palatine) depicted in the background with entwined buffalo horns as a crest.	p. 248
131		Tournament 33 Foot joust	Combat with swords and pavises (oblong shields) against Anthoni Tusin. Freydal (right) has Hercules depicted on his pavise.	p. 249
132		Tournament 33 Mummery	This painting of a masquerade, unusually, takes place out doors. Almost all other mummery paintings in the tournabook book are indoors.	pp. 250–251
133		Tournament 34 Rennen	Geschifttartschen-Rennen (Joust of war with "flying" and "exploding" shields) against Veit von Wolkenstein (d. 1498/99) who was a Feldhauptmann in the Imperial army. During the Flemish revolts of the 1480s he and Maxmilian were imprisoned at Bruges.	pp. 252–253
134		Tournament 34 Stechen	Welsches Gestech (Italian joust of peace) against Lancelot de Bréville (see fol. 127)	p. 254
135		Tournament 34 Foot joust	Combat with long swords against Frederick III, Elector of Saxony, one of the most important rulers of the Empire.	p. 255
136		Tournament 34 Mummery	The drum of the musician at the rear of the dancers bears emblems of the Order of the Golden Fleece.	pp. 256–257
137		Tournament 35 Rennen	Scharfrennen (Joust of war with "flying" shields) against Wolfgang von Polheim, who was one of Maximilian's closest friends. He was one of those imprisoned with Maximilian at Bruges in 1488 during the Flemish revolt	pp. 258–259
138		Tournament 35 Stechen	Deutsches Gestech (German joust of peace) against Erkinger von Schwarzenberg.	p. 260
139		Tournament 35 Foot joust	Combat with pikes and small shields against Ulrich von Weispriach (1437-1503), an Austrian nobleman who served Maximilian as an official in Tyrol and governor of Carinthia	p. 261
140		Tournament 35 Mummery	One of the dramatic staged dances typical of Renaissance masquerades that would later evolve into ballet performances.	pp. 262–263
141		Tournament 36 Rennen	Anzogenrennen (joust of war with fixed shields) against Count Niklas I von Salm-Neuberg, who would lead the defence during the Ottoman siege of Vienna of 1529.	pp. 264–265
142		Tournament 36 Stechen	Deutsches Gestech (German joust of peace) against Christopher I, Margrave of Baden, Maximilian's life-long close friend. He attended Maximilian's wedding to Mary of Burgundy and jousted in the wedding tournaments.	p. 266
143		Tournament 36 Foot joust	Combat with halberds against Wolfgang von Fürstenberg.	p. 267
144		Tournament 36 Mummery	This painting of a masquerade is a work in progress. The staircase in the foreground is incongruous in terms of size and perspective and Stefan Krause speculates whether it was added by Maximilian himself.	pp. 268–269
145		Tournament 37 Rennen	Scharfrennen (joust of war with "flying" shields against Christoph Schenk von Limburg (d. 1515) who held a number of positions in Maximilian's court and, in common with many of the courtiers depicted, helped Maximilian escape from imprisonment in Bruges during the Flemish Revolt of 1487-1492. Maximililian was his life-long friend as a result.	pp. 270–271
146		Tournament 37 Stechen	Welsches Gestech (Italian joust of peace) against Hans Teschitz (see fol. 22) on the far side of the barrier with an anchor as a helmet crest.	p. 272
147		Tournament 37 Foot joust	Combat with awl pikes against Hans Traupitz	p. 273
148		Tournament 37 Mummery	Like fol. 144 the staircase and arch on the left was a later insertion by a different artist. Stefan Krause questions whether it could be Maximilian himself.	pp. 274–75
149		Tournament 38 Rennen	Feldrennen (joust of war in reinforced field armour) against Philip von Knöringen. This is the second course of the Feldrennen when lances and the reinforced armour components are discarded and combat continues with swords.	pp. 276–277
150		Tournament 38 Stechen	Deutsches Gestech (German joust of peace) against Sigmund von Prüschenk, count of Hardegg (d.1500) who served both Maximilian and his father and held numerous positions under both of them, including hereditary Erbtruchsess of Styria	p. 278
151		Tournament 38 Foot joust	Combat with pikes against Andrä von Liechtenstein-Carneid (see fol. 244)	p. 279
152		Tournament 38 Mummery	Normally, it is only the male courtiers that wear a themed costume. Unusually, in this painting the ladies wear the same blue and yellow theme as the men.	pp. 280–281
153		Tournament 39 Rennen	Scharfrennen (joust of war with "flying" shields) against Count Albert von Hohenzollern (see fol. 19)	p. 283
154		Tournament 39 Stechen	Deutsches Gestech (German joust of peace) against Sigmund von Prüschenk, count of Hardegg, who participated in the tournaments held at Trier in 1473 to mark the meeting between Maximilian's father and Charles the Bold. He was one of Maximilian's closest advisers.	p. 284
155		Tournament 39 Foot joust	Combat with daggers against Georg von Sensheim (see fol. 253)	p. 285
156		Tournament 39 Mummery	As is the case with almost all the images showing dancing only two musicians provide the music, normally a drummer and a flautist.	pp. 286–287
157		Tournament 40 Rennen	Scharfrennen (Joust of war with "flying" shields) against Frederick III, Elector of Saxony (see fol. 135) who is on the right. Freydal's helmet crest is two golden pomegrantes which is an allusion to the reconquest of Granada in 1492.	pp. 288–289
158		Tournament 40 Stechen	Deutsches Gestech against Jacob Halder, a nobleman from Bavaria.	p. 290
159		Tournament 40 Foot joust	Combat with daggers with Georg von Weispriach who was the son of Ulrich the elder, Baron of Kobelsdorf and Braunau. Freydal (left) is trying to tip over his opponent by pulling up his leg.	p. 291
160		Tournament 40 Mummery	Masquerades were often held to honour a high ranking guest. Here the dance is performed to entertain a crowned lady sitting on a platformed chair in the centre of the room.	pp. 292–293
161		Tournament 41 Rennen	Anzogenrennen (Joust of war with fixed shields) against Wolfgang von Polheim, one of Maximilian's closest companions.	pp. 294–295
162		Tournament 41 Stechen	Welsches Gestech (Italian joust of peace) against Jean V de Bruges, Lord of Gruythuyse (1455-1512) in green, a Burgundian nobleman. At the Battle of Guinegate fought by Maximilian against the French, Jean was taken prisoner and changed sides, serving at the French court for the rest of his life.	p. 296
163		Tournament 41 Foot joust	Combat with swords and targes against Georg von Frundsberg, one of Maximilian's landsknecht commanders.	p. 297
164		Tournament 41 Mummery	The grotesque-style dancers or mummers dance a moresca. The emblems of the Order of the Golden Fleece appear on the musicians drum.	pp. 298–299
165		Tournament 42 Rennen	Feldrennen (Joust of war in reinforced field armour) against an unnamed opponent.	pp. 300–301
166		Tournament 42 Stechen	Deutsches Gestech (German joust of war) against Veit von Wolkenstein (see fol. 133) on the right, who has the same crest (clouds and flames) as he has in fol. 49	p. 302
167		Tournament 42 Foot joust	Combat with Falchions, a single-edged sword, with Adam von Weineck, a nobleman from the Tyrol, who was a captain in Maximilian's army, and fought in the wars against Venice. He was also steward of Trento castle.	p. 303
168		Tournament 42 Mummery	This miniature, reminiscent of early Netherlandish painting, is unusual in Freydal as it is an intimate depiction of a mummery being held in a crowded space. A separate dining room with a table set with silverware is seen through an arch in the background.	pp. 304–305
169		Tournament 43 Rennen	Anzogenrennen (Joust of war with fixed shields) against an unnamed opponent. Analysis of the painting shows that originally the lance on the left was intact but was changed, possibly at Maximilian's request, to a splintered lance.	pp. 306–307
170		Tournament 43 Stechen	Welsches Gestech (Italian joust of peace) against Leonhard von Hag who held the ceremonial office of Maximilian's cup-bearer and steward of the Austrian towns of Hainburg and Schwechat.	p. 308
171		Tournament 43 Foot joust	Combat with halberds with Cristoff Flednitzer	p. 309
172		Tournament 43 Mummery	This is one of the most ornate miniatures in the tournament book. The courtiers, who wear masks, are dressed as Ottoman Turks	pp. 310–311
173		Tournament 44 Rennen	Scharfrennnen (Joust of war with flying shields) against an unnamed opponent. This is one of the few paintings which has multiple figures. In this case a runaway horse disrupts the scene.	pp. 312–313
174		Tournament 44 Foot joust	Combat with long swords against the Burgundian diplomat Guy II de Baenst who died before 1502.	p. 314
175		Tournament 44 Mummery	This painting of a masquerade is based on a drawing held in Rome.	pp. 314–315
176		Tournament 45 Rennen	Geschifttartschen-Rennen (Joust of war with "flying" and "exploding" shields) against Caspar Winzerer, an Imperial army commander who had a reputation for looting.	pp. 316–317
177		Tournament 45 Stechen	Welsches Gestech (Italian joust of peace) against an opponent noted as "Der von Ramulj". The anoymous artist's technique suggests he was from the Danube valley in south east Germany and was familiar with the work of Albrecht Altdorfer	p. 318
178		Tournament 45 Foot joust	Combat with pikes against Adam von Losenstein (c. 1470-1510), the son of a governor of Styria.	p. 319
179		Tournament 45 Mummery	A masquerade with unnamed participants with each of the men wearing a single feather in their headdress.	pp. 320–321
180		Tournament 46 Rennen	Anzogenrennen (Joust of war with fixed shields) against William IV, Duke of Jülich-Berg.	pp. 322–323
181		Tournament 46 Stechen	Deutsches Gestech (German joust of peace) against Count Vincenz von Moers, who wears a birdcage on his helmet. Freydal is on the left.	p. 324
182		Tournament 46 Foot joust	Combat with halberds against Count Felix von Werdenberg-Sargans, noted for murdering Andreas von Sonnenberg who had insulted him at the wedding of Ulrich, Duke of Württemberg in 1511.	p. 325
183		Tournament 46 Mummery	Infrared reflectography shows that a much more elaborate composition with more decorative features was planned for this masquerade.	pp. 326–327
184		Tournament 47 Rennen	Feldrennen (Joust of war in reinforced field armour) against an unnamed opponent. The harnesses depicted are state-of-the-art at the time.	pp. 328–329
185		Tournament 47 Stechen	Welsches Gestech (Italian joust of peace) against Count Andreas von Sonnenberg, murdered by Felix von Werdenberg who is depicted in folio 182. Maximilian acquitted Werdenberg.	p. 330
186		Tournament 47 Foot joust	Combat with daggers against Adam von Frundsberg	p. 331
187		Tournament 47 Mummery	The dancers in this masquerade are dressed in Freydal's colours of white, crimson and black and wear wooden pattens attached to their shoes to protect the leather soles.	pp. 332–333
188		Tournament 48 Rennen	Scharfrennen (Joust of war with "flying" shields) against Heinrich von Fürstenberg. See fol. 240	pp. 334–335
189		Tournament 48 Stechen	Welsches Gestech (Italian joust of peace) against an opponent noted as "Forrestir zu Prugk". Freydal (left) wears a Burgundian hennin, an allusion to his marriage to Mary of Burgundy	p. 336
190		Tournament 48 Foot joust	Combat with long swords against an opponent noted as "Peter Freyenstainer"	p. 337
191		Tournament 48 Mummery	The depiction of this masquerade is very similar to the one in folio 227. They were probably baseed on the same template.	pp. 338–339

=== Folios 192-255 (Tournaments 49-64) ===
fol.	Image	Tournament and activity	Image description	Ref.
192		Tournament 49 Rennen	Geschifttartschen-Rennen (Joust of war with "flying" and "exploding" shields) against Philipp von Rechberg (see fol.200)	pp. 340–341
193		Tournament 49 Stechen	Deutsches Gestech (German joust of peace) against Anton von Yfan (on the left). Freydal's clothing is covered in repetitions of the crowned letter M. The crest for his helmet is a representation of the Wheel of Fortune.	p. 342
194		Tournament 49 Foot joust	Combat with pikes against an opponent noted as "Hanns Rosegker"	p. 343
195		Tournament 49 Mummery	In this masquerade, the ladies are accompanied by male courtiers in the guise of giants.	pp. 344–345
196		Tournament 50 Rennen	Geschifttartschen-Rennen (Joust of War with "flying" and "exploding" shields) against Adam von Törring (on the left), a Bavarian noble who was recorded as a participant of many tournaments in southern Germany in the ate 15th century.	pp. 346–347
197		Tournament 50 Stechen	Deutsches Gestech (German joust of peace) against Count Philipp von Nassau	p. 348
198		Tournament 50 Foot joust	Combat with swords and bucklers against Friedrich Bruenner, Lord of Stübingen, one of Maximilian's life-long friends who he grew up with.	p. 349
199		Tournament 50 Mummery	Masquerade with unnamed participants	pp. 350–351
200		Tournament 51 Rennen	Geschifttartschen-Rennen (Joust of war with "flying" and "exploding" shields against Philipp von Rechberg (on left with a golden stag as a crest). Von Rechberg, a Swabian noble, appears 11 times in the Freydal tournament book	pp. 352–353
201		Tournament 51 Stechen	Welsches Gestech (Italian joust of peace) against Count Ulrich von Werdenberg who is on the left and has a crest symbolizing love's sorrow	p. 354
202		Tournament 51 Foot joust	Combat with war hammers and targes (small shields). Freydal's opponent is noted as "Ramyng", possibly Andre Ramung one of Maximilian's childhood companions.	p. 355
203		Tournament 51 Mummery	As in folio 92, the dancers wear Hungarian costume and papier-mâché cocks' heads. A similar theme was adopted at a masquerade in Innsbruck in 1492 in honour of the Elector of Saxony's visit.	pp. 356–357
204		Tournament 52 Rennen	Bundrennen (Joust of war with "flying" shields and without bevors) against Frederick III, Elector of Saxony. Uniquely, a note on the miniature records the historical event on which it was based: the Perlenrennen (Pearls' Joust) at Augsburg in 1510 when Maximilian wore extravagant clothing bedecked with pearls and other jewels.	pp. 358–359
205		Tournament 52 Stechen	Welsches Gestech (Italian joust of peace) against Jacques of Savoy, Count of Romont, a Burgundian courtier.	p. 360
206		Tournament 52 Foot joust	Combat with long swords against Leonhard Hohenfelder, Lord of Sankt Peter in der Au. He was one of Maximilian's childhood friends.	p. 361
207		Tournament 52 Mummery	This miniature features cross-dressing: the male courtiers wear ladies' attire. During a masquerade in 1498, Weickhart von Polheim was recorded as wearing women's clothes.	p. 362
208		Tournament 53 Rennen	Anzogenrennen (Joust of war with fixed shields) against Frederick III, Elector of Saxony.	p. 365
209		Tournament 53 Stechen	Deutsches Gestech (German joust of peace) against Philipp von Rechberg (fol. 200)	p. 366
210		Tournament 53 Foot joust	Combat with pikes against Georg von Tschernembl, whose family held lands in Carniola and Styria. He held a number of military and other posts in Maximilian's domains.	p. 367
211		Tournament 53 Mummery	The courtiers at this masquerade wear Freydal's colours: white, crimson and black.	pp. 368–369
212		Tournament 54 Rennen	Geschifttartschen-Rennen (Joust of war with "flying" and "exploding" shields) against Wolfgang von Polheim. The quality of this miniature indicates that the painter was a skilled master linked to the workshop of Albrecht Altdorfer at Regensburg	pp. 370–371
213		Tournament 54 Stechen	Welsches Gestech (Italian joust of peace) against either Francis Castelalto (d. 1503) or one of his three sons.	p. 372
214		Tournament 54 Foot joust	Combat with long swords against an opponent noted as "Ulrich Eernauer"	p. 373
215		Tournament 54 Mummery	A masquerade with unnamed participants. The uniformity in of the courtiers costumes can be seen. This was intended to provide a setting where all were of equal rank	pp. 374–375
216		Tournament 55 Rennen	Geschifttartschen-Rennen (Joust of war with "flying" and "exploding" shields) against Count Ludwig of Löwenstein, son of the Elector Palatine. Ludwig was unable to succeed his father because of his parents' morganatic marriage	pp. 376–377
217		Tournament 55 Stechen	Deutsches Gestech (German joust of peace) against Sigmund von Welsperg - see fol. 9	p. 378
218		Tournament 55 Foot joust	Combat with pikes against Jörg von Stubenberg presumed to be the son of Leuthold von Stubenberg, governor of Styria 1453-1461.	p. 379
219		Tournament 55 Mummery	Masquerade with unnamed participants. The male dancers masking can be seen. This gave them anonymity during lower-class dances such as the moresca, which would otherwise undermine their aristocratic dignity	pp. 380–381
220		Tournament 56 Rennen	Anzogenrennen (Joust of war with fixed shields) against Philipp von Rechberg (on the left). Freydal wears antlers as a helmet crest. As with fol. 212, the quality of this painting indicates that the artist was a south German master connected to Albrecht Altdorfer.	pp. 382–383
221		Tournament 56 Stechen	Welsches Gestech (Italian joust of peace) against Wolfgang von Polheim	p. 384
222		Tournament 56 Foot joust	Combat with daggers against Christoph von Rottal a Styrian aristocrat.	p. 385
223		Tournament 56 Mummery	Masquerade with the courtiers dressed as giants - see fol. 195	pp. 386–387
224		Tournament 57 Rennen	Geschifttartschen-Rennen (Joust of war with "flying" and "exploding" shields) against an unnamed opponent. Surcoats, lances and caparisons are colour co-ordinated	pp. 388–389
225		Tournament 57 Stechen	Deutsches Gestech (German joust of peace) against Eitel Friedrich II, Count of Hohenzollern	p. 390
226		Tournament 57 Foot joust	Combat with long swords against an opponent noted as "Caspar Grenitzperger"	p. 391
227		Tournament 57 Mummery	Masquerade with unnamed participants that appears to use the same template as fol. 191	pp. 392–393
228		Tournament 58 Rennen	Anzogenrennen (Joust of war with fixed shields) against Philip, Elector Palatine	pp. 394–395
229		Tournament 58 Stechen	Gestech im Beinharnisch (Joust of peace in leg armour) against Count von Moers (see fol. 110)	p. 396
230		Tournament 58 Foot joust	Combat with maces and pavises (oblong shields) against Leonhart Gödl	p. 397
231		Tournament 58 Mummery	This is one of the profession-themed masquerades. In this case, the dancers and musicians wear huntsmen's costumes	pp. 398–399
232		Tournament 59 Rennen	Feldrennen (Joust of war in reinforced armour) against Anton von Yfan	pp. 400–401
233		Tournament 59 Stechen	Welsches Gestech (Italian joust of peace) against Maximilian's son, Philip the Handsome. As Freydal is Maximilian's alter ego, the scene is anachronistic: the story of Freydal is the lead-up to his marriage to Philip's mother, Mary of Burgundy	p. 402
234		Tournament 59 Foot joust	Combat with halberds against Wilhelm Auer von Herrenkirchen (on left) who was equerry to Archduke Sigismund of Tyrol from 1490 to 1492	p. 403
235		Tournament 59 Mummery	In this masquerade, the male dancers wear slashed doublets which dates the scene to around 1500 when that style was at the apex of fashion. The musicians play shawms, a form of woodwind instrument.	pp. 404–405
236		Tournament 60 Rennen	Feldrennen (Joust of war in reinforced field armour) against Count Georg von Montfort	pp. 406–407
237		Tournament 60 Stechen	Welsches Gestech (Italian joust of peace) against Count Eitel-Frederick II von Hohenzollern	p. 408
238		Tournament 60 Foot joust	Combat with flails against an opponent noted as "Gyrom"	p. 409
239		Tournament 60 Mummery	A masquerade with unnamed participants	p. 410
240		Tournament 61 Rennen	Anzogenrennen (Joust of war with fixed shields) against Heinrich VII, Count of Fürstenberg and Landgrave in Der Baar (1464-1499). Heinrich served as a councillor to Maximilian.	p. 412-413
241		Tournament 61 Stechen	Welsches Gestech (Italian joust of peace) against an opponent noted as "Der von Schafftenberg"	p. 414
242		Tournament 61 Foot joust	Combat with halberds with an opponent noted as "Caspar Pergkhamer"	p. 415
243		Tournament 61 Mummery	A masquerade with unnamed participants	pp. 416–417
244		Tournament 62 Rennen	Geschifttartschen-Rennen (Joust of war with "flying" and "exploding" shields) against Andrä von Liechtenstein-Carneid (on the right) who, in 1500, was appointed by Maximilian as captain of Gorizia and Pfleger of Kaltern	pp. 418–419
245		Tournament 62 Stechen	Gestech im Beinharnisch (Joust of peace in leg armour) against Georg von Weispriach (on left)	p. 420
246		Tournament 62 Foot joust	Combat with poles against an opponent noted as "Hans Sciffer"	p. 421
247		Tournament 62 Mummery	A masquerade with unnamed participants	pp. 422–423
248		Tournament 63 Rennen	Geschifttartschen-Rennen (Joust of war with "flying" and "exploding" shields) against Count Georg von Montfort, founder of the Styrian branch of the Montforts and known for developing a medicine for horses	pp. 424–425
249		Tournament 63 Stechen	Gestech im Beinharnisch (Joust of peace in leg armour) against Philipp von Rechberg (fol. 200). Here, Freydal's horse (on left) wears a "blind" shaffron which entirely covers the eyes to prevent the horse taking fright	p. 426
250		Tournament 63 Foot joust	Combat with pikes against Balthasar Rogendorf (see fol. 61)	p. 427
251		Tournament 63 Mummery	In this masquerade the male dancers wear scimitars as an allusion to the wars with the Ottomans	pp. 428–429
252		Tournament 64 Rennen	Anzogenrennen (Joust of war with fixed shields) against Frederick of Brandenburg-Ansbach, son of Albrecht III Achilles, Elector of Brandenburg	pp. 430–431
253		Tournament 64 Stechen	Welsches Gestech (Italian joust of peace) against Georg von Sensheim, who was a military commander of Albert IV, Duke of Bavaria and was killed in fighting during the War of the Succession of Landshut	p. 432
254		Tournament 64 Foot joust	Combat with halberds against Charles de Croÿ, Prince of Chimay who is on the ground	p. 433
255		Tournament 64 Mummery	A masquerade with unnamed participants	pp. 434–435

== Bibliography ==
- Anderson, Natalie (2020). "Power and Pageantry: The Tournament at the Court of Maximilian I". In Murray, Alan V.; Watts, Karen (eds.). The Medieval Tournament as Spectacle: Tourneys, Jousts and Pas d'Armes 1100-1600. The Boydell Press. ISBN 978-1-78327-542-7.
- Barber, Richard W. (1974). The Knight and Chivalry. Boydell Press. ISBN 978-0-85115-041-3.
- Clephan, Robert Coltman (1995) [1919]. The Mediaeval Tournament. Courier Corporation. ISBN 978-0-486-28620-4.
- Freeman, Laura (4 May 2019). "The joy of jousting". The Spectator.
- Hart, Clive (2022). The Rise and Fall of the Mounted Knight. Pen and Sword. ISBN 9781399082051.
- Jackson, William (2001). "Tournaments". In Jeep, John M. (ed.). Medieval Germany: An Encyclopedia. Taylor & Francis. ISBN 978-1-351-66540-7.
- Kleinschmidt, Harald (2008). Ruling the Waves: Emperor Maximilian I, the Search for Islands and the Transformation of the European World Picture C. 1500. Brill. ISBN 978-90-6194-020-3.
- Krause, Stefan (2014–2015). "Freydal, the Tournament Book of Emperor Maximilian I: The Washington Manuscript". National Gallery of Art, Washington D.C.
- Krause, Stefan (2014). "Die ritterspiel als ritter Freydalb hat gethon aus ritterlichem gmute – Das Turnierbuch Freydal Kaiser Maximilians I.". In Haag, Sabine; et al. (eds.). Kaiser Maximilian I: der letzte Ritter und das höfische Turnier. Schnell & Steiner. ISBN 978-3-7954-2842-6.
- Krause, Stefan, ed. (2019). Freydal. Medieval Games: the Book of Tournaments of Emperor Maximilian I. Taschen. ISBN 978-3-8365-7681-9.
- Kurth, Willi (1963). The Complete Woodcuts of Albrecht Dürer. Courier Corporation. ISBN 978-0-486-21097-1.
- Locke, Ralph P. (2015). Music and the Exotic from the Renaissance to Mozart. Cambridge University Press. ISBN 978-1-107-01237-0.
- McLaren, Iona (25 May 2019). "Freydal: the 16th-century comic that captures the thrill of jousting". The Telegraph.
- Müller, Jan-Dirk (2003). "The Court of Emperor Maximilian I". In Gosman, Martin; et al. (eds.). Princes and Princely Culture: 1450-1650 Vol. 1. BRILL. ISBN 978-90-04-13572-7.
- Nickel, Helmut; Breiding, Dirk H. (2010). "A Book of Tournaments and Parades from Nuremberg" (PDF). Metropolitan Museum Journal. 45: 125–186. doi:10.1086/met.45.41558057. S2CID 192050359.
- Silver, Larry (2002). "Shining Armor: Emperor Maximilian, Chivalry and War". In Cuneo, Pia F. (ed.). Artful Armies, Beautiful Battles: Art and Warfare in the Early Modern Europe. Brill. ISBN 978-90-04-11588-0.
- Silver, Larry (2013). "Caesar Ludens: Emperor Maximilian I and the Waning Middle Ages". In Sax, Benjamin C.; Gold, Penny Schine (eds.). Cultural Visions: Essays in the History of Culture. BRILL. ISBN 978-90-420-0490-0.
- Taschen Catalogue. "The Legendary Tales of Emperor Maximilian I". Taschen.
- Terjanian, Pierre, ed. (2019). The Last Knight: The Art, Armor, and Ambition of Maximilian I. Metropolitan Museum of Art. ISBN 978-1-58839-674-7.
- von Leitner, Quirin, ed. (1880–1882). Freydal. Des Kaisers Maximilian I. Turniere und Mummereien. Holzhausen.
- Watanabe-O'Kelly, Helen (2000). The Cambridge History of German Literature. Cambridge University Press. ISBN 978-0-521-78573-0.
