= Antonio de Caldonazzo =

Italian nobleman died c. 1510

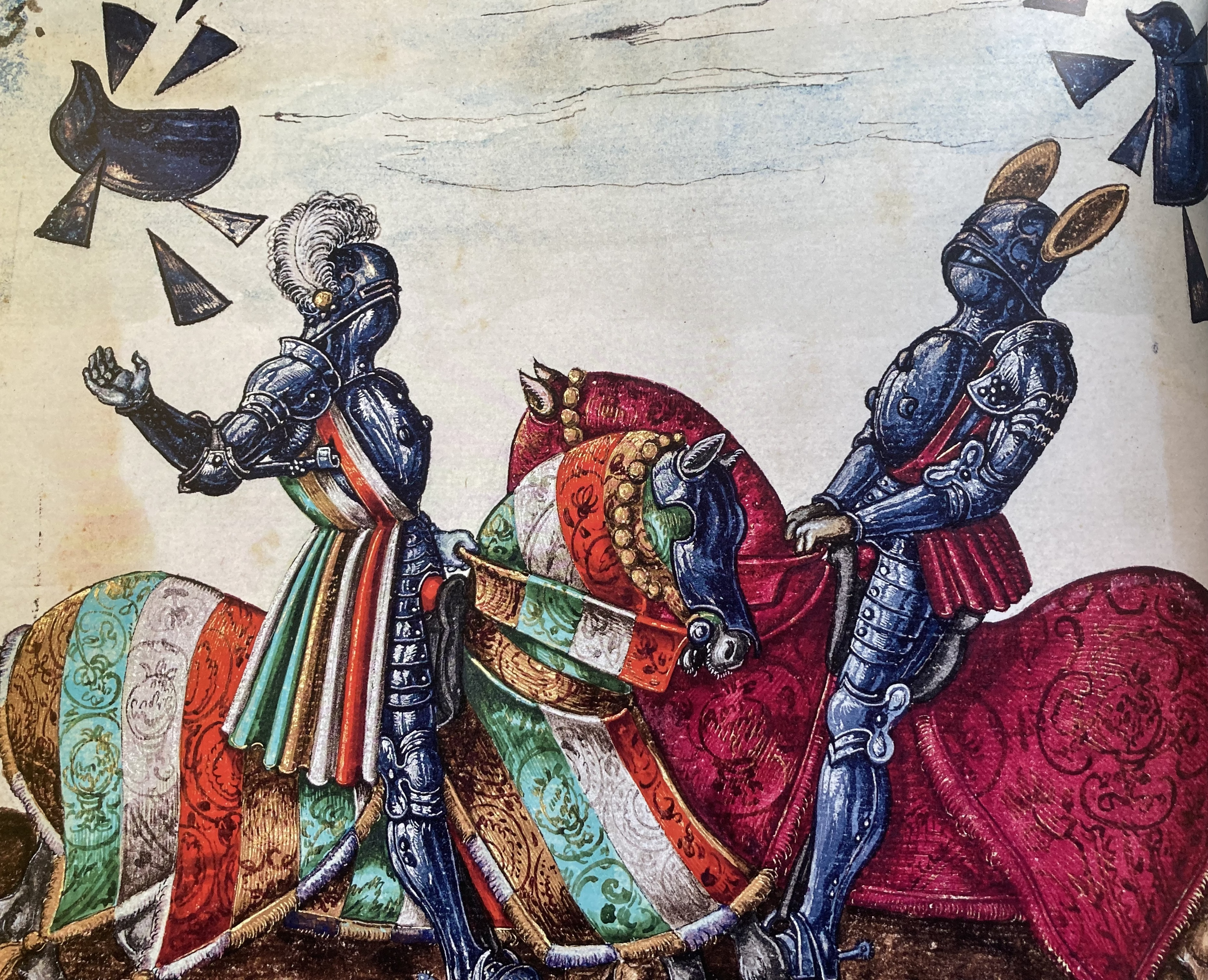
Caldonazzo (right) jousting with an asses' ears crest, from the Freydal tournament book, fol. 5

Antonio de Caldonazzo (died c. 1510), Baron of Ivano, also known as Anton von Yfan, was a nobleman from the northern Italian region of South Tyrol. He was a favourite of the Holy Roman Emperor, Maximilian I and a noted participant in jousts at tournaments. He appears prominently, in a jousting context, in two works of art commissioned by Maximilian: the monumental woodcut, the Triumphal Procession, and in some of the miniature paintings of the Freydal tournament book.

== Name ==
Antonio de Caldonazzo (also spelt Caldonazo) is referred to in German sources as Anton von Yfan. Yfan (Note: Also spelt Yffan, Ifan, Lefon, Lefan or Lyfan) is derived from his title, Baron or Lord of Ivano in Trentino.

== Biography ==
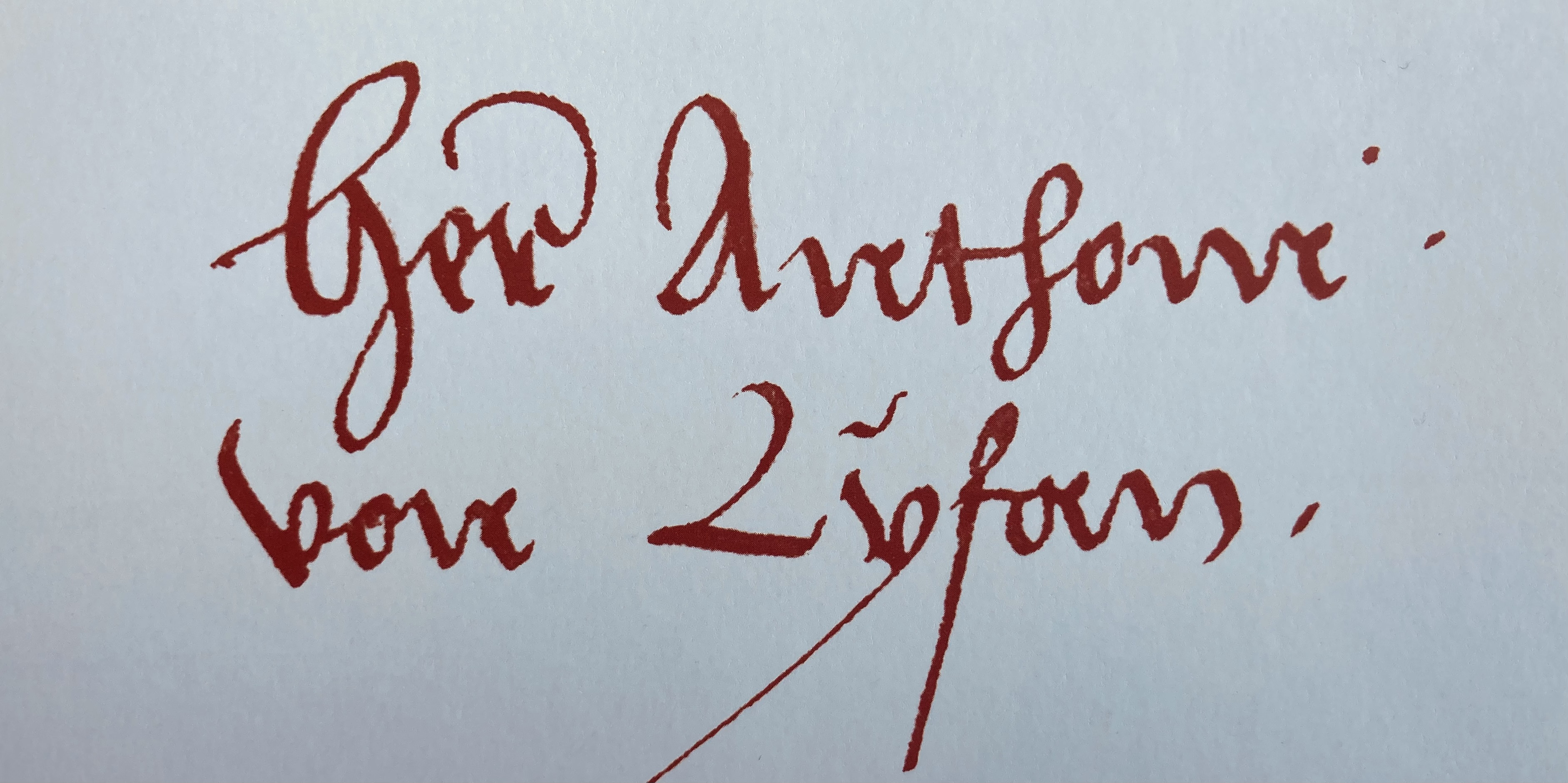
Herr Antoni von Lyfan: the German version of Caldonazzo's name as it was written in the Freydal tournament book

Caldonazzo was the son of Giacomo (or Jacobus) de Caldonazzo, Baron of Ivano, and Laura della Volpe de Vicenza. The Caldonazzo family were long-established as part of the nobility of the South Tyrol. In 1468, following the death of Giacomo, his widow transferred the castle at Ivano to Archduke Sigismund of Habsburg, ruler of the Tyrol, in exchange for the payment of a pension. Sigismund's cousin, Maximilian of Habsburg, son of the Holy Roman Emperor, Frederick III, became ruler of Tyrol in 1490 and, in 1492, Antonio de Caldonazzo and his brother Hans renounced to him their remaining rights to the Barony of Ivano.

Maximilian succeeded his father on the latter's death in 1493 and became Holy Roman Emperor as Maximilian I. Caldonazzo appears to have become a favourite of Maximilian, playing a prominent part amongst a group of courtiers and others closely associated with the Emperor’s enthusiasm for and participation in jousting and tournaments generally. He developed a key role in Maximilian’s court as a jousting competitor and, indeed, Maximilian seems to have particularly enjoyed jousting with him. There are surviving records of Maximilian and Caldonazzo jousting with each other in at least three tournaments: at Linz in December 1489 and January 1490 and at Innsbruck in March 1498. Caldonazzo’s jousting prowess was exhibited at the celebrated tournament held at the wedding of Wolfgang von Polheim and Johanna van Borsselen in Mechelen in 1494 where he was considered to have been the overall tournament champion.

Caldonazzo received a number of favours and appointments from Maximilian. By 1490, he had been appointed as an Imperial Councillor and as Truchsess (a type of seneschal responsible for imperial dining). In 1498, he was given the office, jointly with his brother Hans, of Pfleger (or administrator) of Landeck. In 1501, Maximilian granted him the estate of Kaiserebersdorf, a village on the Danube near Vienna.

Caldonazzo was married to Apollonia von Winden and died c. 1510. The coats of arms of Caldonazzo and his wife, with their names, are inscribed in an arch over the western entrance of the Church of the Assumption at Landeck to mark donations they had made.

== Maximilian's Gedechtnus ==
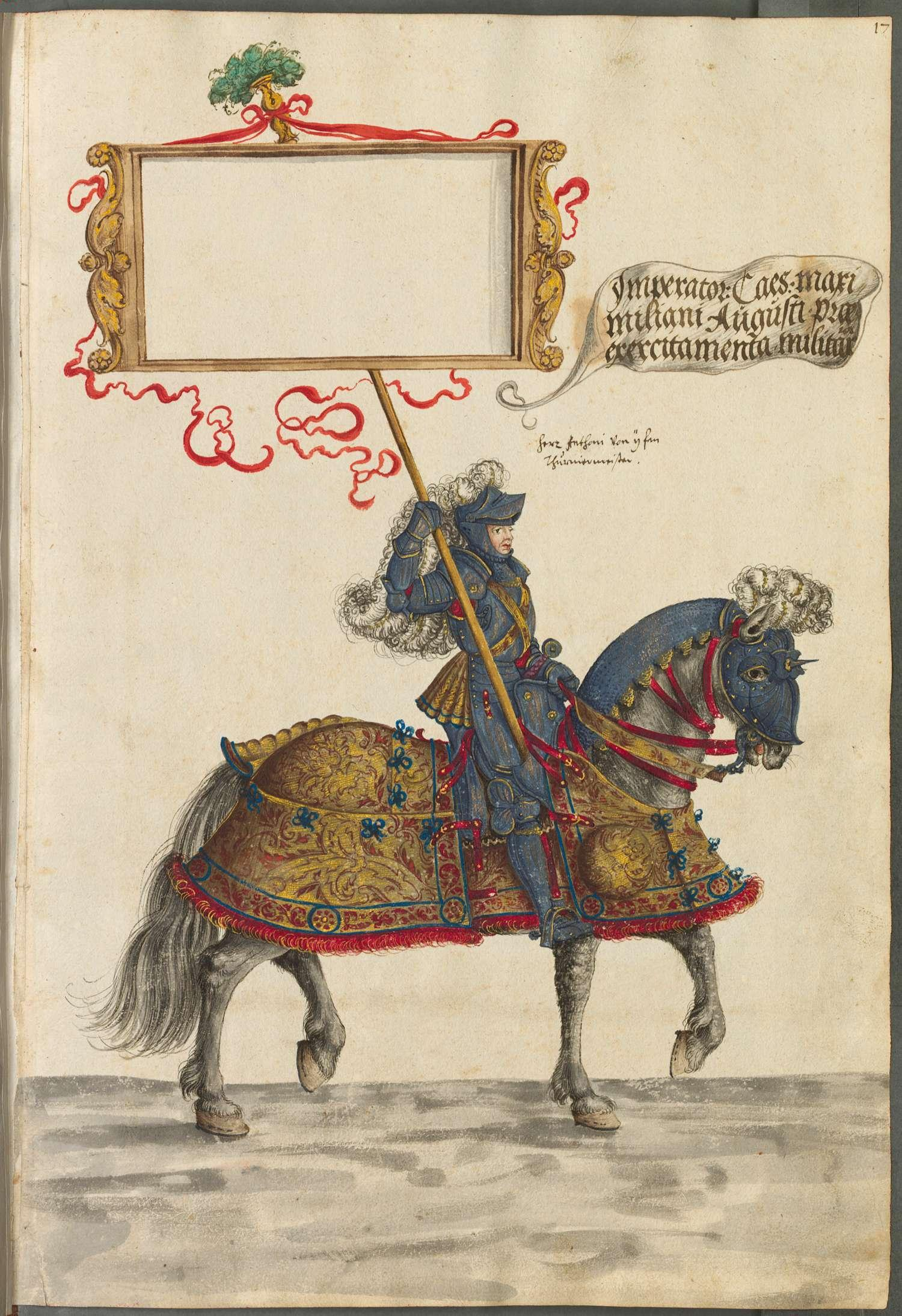
Caldonazzo in a version of his Triumphal Procession image, Hans Burgkmair's Turnierbuch (Note: In this copy of Burgkmair's Turnierbuch, dated to 1540 and held at the Bavarian State Library, "Herr Anthoni von Ÿfan, Turniermeister" is written in very small manuscript beneath and to the right of the banner. The banner, in this version, omits the text praising Maximilian. This may have been to allow for the name of the book's owner to be inscribed.)

During his reign, Maximilian commissioned a number of humanist scholars and artists to assist him in completing a series of projects, in different art forms, intended to immortalize his life and deeds and those of his Habsburg ancestors. He referred to these projects as Gedechtnus ("memorial").

Jousting featured in some of these projects and, because of that, Caldonazzo figured prominently in two of them: the Triumphal Procession and Freydal. In the Triumphal Procession, a monumental series of woodcut prints depicting an imagined "royal entry", Caldonazzo is given a role of particular importance as Turniermeister (‘Master of the Tournament’). He is depicted holding a banner which reads (in translation):

Much of his [Maximilian’s] time was nobly spent
In the true knightly tournament,
A source of valour and elation;
Therefore upon his instigation,
With knightly spirit and bold heart
I [Caldonazzo] have improved this fighting art.

The Freydal tournament book, one of the principal components of the Freydal project, is a series of miniature paintings depicting scenes from 64 fictional tournaments. In the paintings, Maximilian, in the guise of the eponymous hero Freydal, jousts with contemporary figures, many of whom Maximilian did, in fact, joust with in real life. Of the 191 depictions of jousts, (Note: There are, in fact, 255 paintings (originally 256) in total. However, for each of the 64 tournaments there is one painting depicting a post-tournament masquerade rather than a joust.) Caldonazzo features in eight of them as Freydal's opponent. Only two other opponents – Wolfgang von Polheim and Philipp von Rechberg – feature more times than Caldonazzo.

== Bibliography ==
- Anderson, Natalie (2017). The Tournament and its Role in the Court Culture of Emperor Maximilian I (1459-1519) (Thesis). University of Leeds White Rose eTheses.
- Anderson, Natalie (2020). "Power and Pageantry: The Tournament at the Court of Maximilian I". In Murray, Alan V.; Watts, Karen (eds.). The Medieval Tournament as Spectacle: Tourneys, Jousts and Pas d'Armes 1100-1600. The Boydell Press. ISBN 978-1-78327-542-7.
- Boeheim, Wendelin (1898). "Die Kriegs in den Städten und festen Plätzen in Niederösterreich und im westlichen Ungarn unter Kaiser Maximilian I". Berichte und Mittheilungen des Alterthums-Vereines zu Wien. 28. Verein für Geschichte der Stadt Wien: 15–26.
- Büchner, Robert (2005). St. Christoph am Arlberg. Böhlau. ISBN 3-205-77282-2.
- Kleinschmidt, Harald (2008). Ruling the Waves: Emperor Maximilian I, the Search for Islands and the Transformation of the European World Picture C. 1500. Brill. ISBN 978-90-6194-020-3.
- Köfler, Werner; Schmitz-Esser, Romedio (2013). "Die Inschriften des Bundeslandes Tirol Politischer Bezirk Landeck: Landeck, Pfk. Mariä Himmelfahrt". Die Deutschen Inschriften - Wiener Reihe (in German). Austrian Academy of Sciences.
- Krause, Stefan (2014–2015). "Freydal, the Tournament Book of Emperor Maximilian I: The Washington Manuscript". National Gallery of Art, Washington D.C.
- Krause, Stefan, ed. (2019). Freydal. Medieval Games: the Book of Tournaments of Emperor Maximilian I. Taschen. ISBN 978-3-8365-7681-9.
- Leitner, Quirin von, ed. (1880–1882). Freydal. Des Kaisers Maximilian I. Turniere und Mummereien. Holzhausen.
- Nickel, Helmut; Breiding, Dirk H. (2010). "A Book of Tournaments and Parades from Nuremberg" (PDF). Metropolitan Museum Journal. 45: 125–186. doi:10.1086/met.45.41558057. S2CID 192050359.
- Silver, Larry (2002). "Shining Armor: Emperor Maximilian, Chivalry and War". In Cuneo, Pia F. (ed.). Artful Armies, Beautiful Battles: Art and Warfare in the Early Modern Europe. Brill. ISBN 978-90-04-11588-0.
- Terjanian, Pierre, ed. (2019). The Last Knight: The Art, Armor, and Ambition of Maximilian I. Metropolitan Museum of Art. ISBN 978-1-58839-674-7.
- Watanabe-O'Kelly, Helen (2000). The Cambridge History of German Literature. Cambridge University Press. ISBN 978-0-521-78573-0.
