= Hans Valkenauer =

German sculptor born 1448-died after 1518

Hans Valkenauer (born 1448; died after 1518) was a German sculptor, working from Salzburg from about 1480 and specialising in funerary monuments in the late Gothic style.

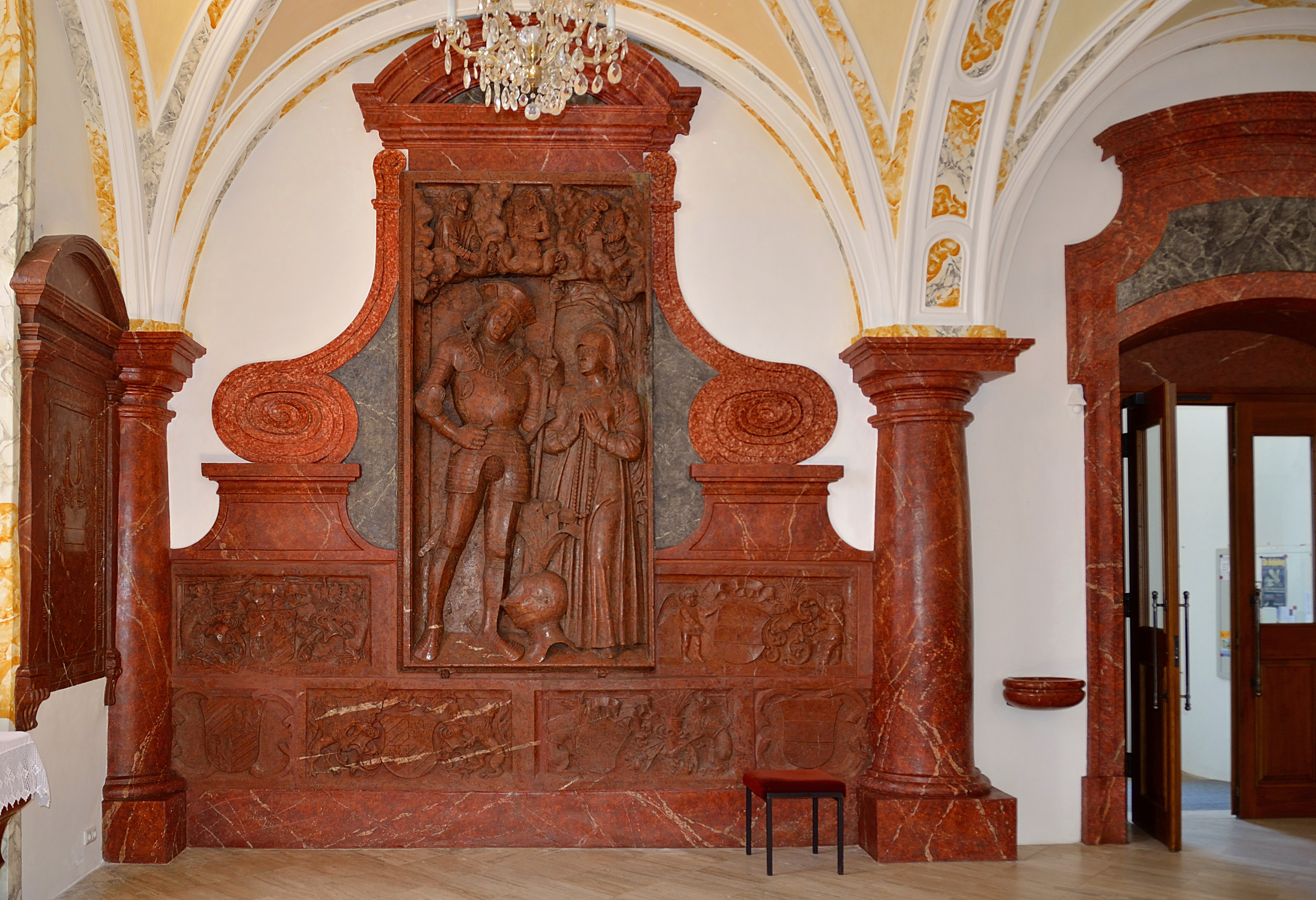
Valkenauer's tomb monument for Wolfgang von Polheim in St Anna's, Oberthalheim

== Early life ==
Valkenauer was born in 1448, probably in the Salzburg area, or possibly Regensburg where his putative father, Martin Valkenauer, was recorded as being resident in 1465. The first mention of Hans Valkenauer in historical sources was on 18 October 1479 when he was granted citizenship of the city of Salzburg.

== Main body of work ==
Valkenauer became known for creating a large number of tomb monuments, often in the form of sculpted slabs of red marble, and mainly in Salzburg. He followed in the funerary art traditions of the Austrian cities of Vienna, Wiener Neustadt and Salzburg. His work also shows the influence of the anonymous German engraver given the notname of Master E. S. and the Dutch sculptor Nikolaus Gerhaert.

His first known work, from around 1480, was the tomb of Lukas Lamprechtshauser at the Dominican Church of Saint Blasius in Regensburg. Other important works followed including tomb monuments in churches in Braunau, Villach and in Carinthia (Maria Saal and Millstatt) and the Kunz Horn epitaph in St. Lorenz, Nuremberg and the Wolfgang von Polheim tomb monument in St Anna's, Oberthalheim.

However, it is his works in Salzburg with which Valkenauer is most associated, and he came to prominence as the city's leading late Gothic sculptor. His work included monuments in the Margaret Chapel of the Petersfriedhof cemetery and in the Hohensalzburg Castle. In the latter case, this included a series of red marble reliefs in the St George's Chapel and seven spotted red marble busts integrated into the architecture of the building. In 1487, city officials paid him six florins, a significant amount of money, to create an anti-semitic Judensau sculpture. It was carved as a marble frieze on the tower of the Town Hall facing a synagogue.

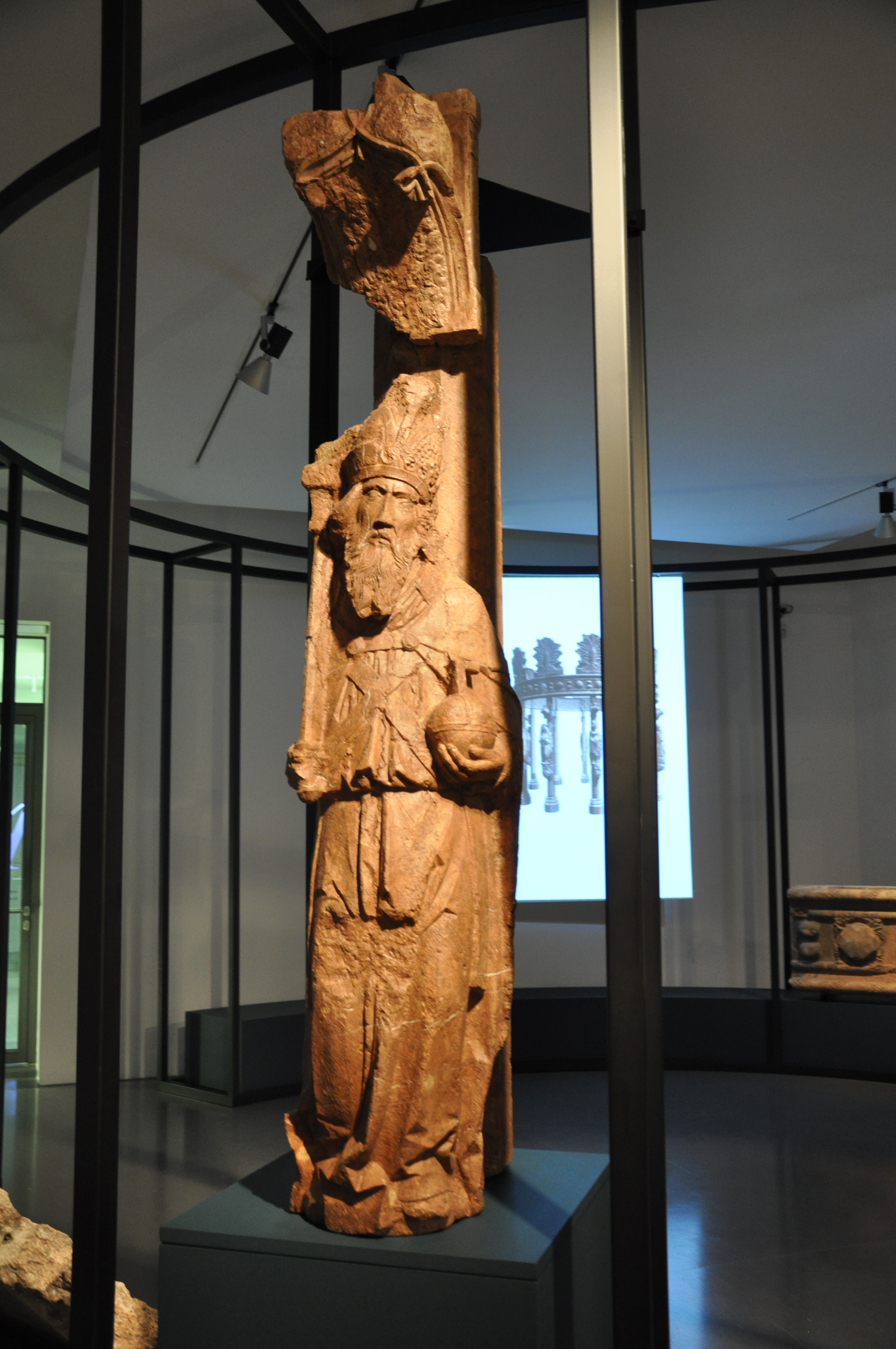
A surviving figure from Valkenauer's work for Maximilian I

== Later life: Maximilian I's commission ==
In 1514 the Habsburg Emperor, Maximilian I commissioned Valkenauer to create a monument in Speyer cathedral to 12 of the kings, emperors and consorts interred in the cathedral. The design was in the form of a 6-metre diameter crown supported by 12 columns each bearing a sculpture of one of the interred historical figures.

It was never completed as work on it stopped when Maximilian died in 1519. The elements and sculptures that were created, much of it by Valkenauer's shop rather than by Valkenauer himself, have survived and are held in the Salzburg Museum (formerly known as the Carolino-Augusteum Museum). The sculpted figures have a doleful and contemplative appearance and the style is very much in the Gothic tradition rather than that of Renaissance sculpture. Valkenauer died some time after 1518.

== Bibliography ==
- Hourihane, Colum, ed. (2012). "Valkenauer, Hans". The Grove Encyclopedia of Medieval Art and Architecture. Vol. 6. Oxford University Press. ISBN 978-0-19-539536-5.
- Kammel, Frank Matthias (2007). "Valkenauer, Hans". In Grieb, Manfred (ed.). Nürnberger Künstlerlexikon. Vol. 3. De Gruyter. ISBN 978-3-11-091296-8.
- Nadel, Stan (2009). Salzburg and the Jews: A Historical Walking Guide. Wipf & Stock. ISBN 978-1-60608-593-6.
- Wiedl, Birgit (2010). "Laughing at the Beast: The Judensau Anti-Jewish Propaganda and Humor from the Middle Ages to the Early Modern Period". In Classen, Albrecht (ed.). Laughter in the Middle Ages and Early Modern Times: Epistemology of a Fundamental Human Behavior, Its Meaning, and Consequences. De Gruyter. ISBN 978-3-11-024548-6.
