= Proxy marriage =

Wedding where one or both spouses are not physically present

A proxy wedding or proxy marriage is a wedding in which one or both of the individuals being united are not physically present, usually being represented instead by other persons (proxies). If both partners are absent, this is known as a double proxy wedding.

Marriage by proxy is usually resorted to in one of two situations: either a couple wish to marry but one or both partners cannot attend (for reasons such as military service, imprisonment, or travel restrictions); or a couple lives in a jurisdiction in which they cannot legally marry.

In most jurisdictions, the law requires that both parties to a marriage be physically present: proxy weddings are not recognized as legally binding. Under the English common law, however, if a proxy marriage is valid under the law of the place where the marriage was celebrated (the lex loci celebrationis) then it will be recognised as valid in England and Wales.

== History ==
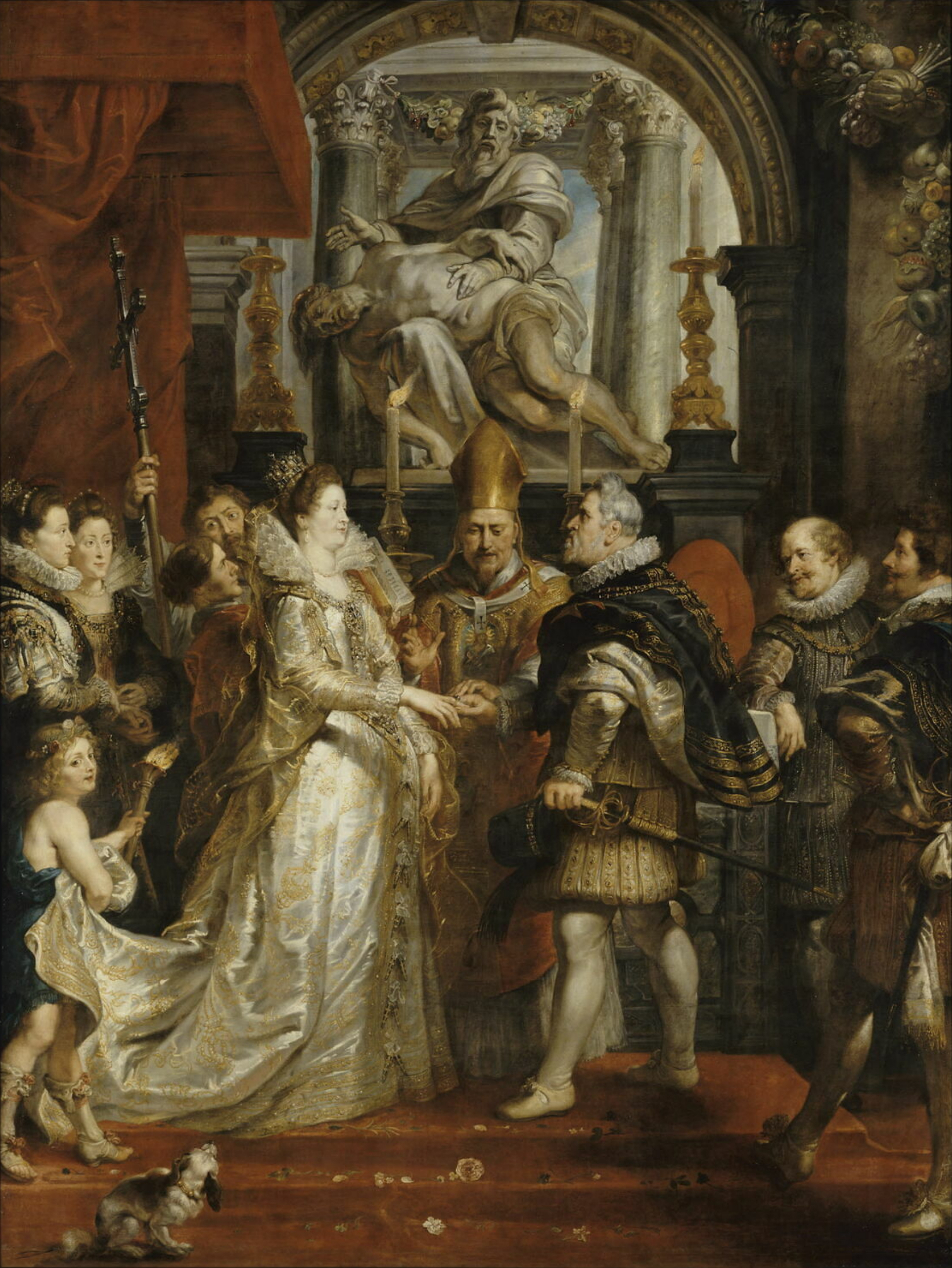
The Wedding by Proxy of Marie de' Medici to King Henry IV by Peter Paul Rubens (1622–25)

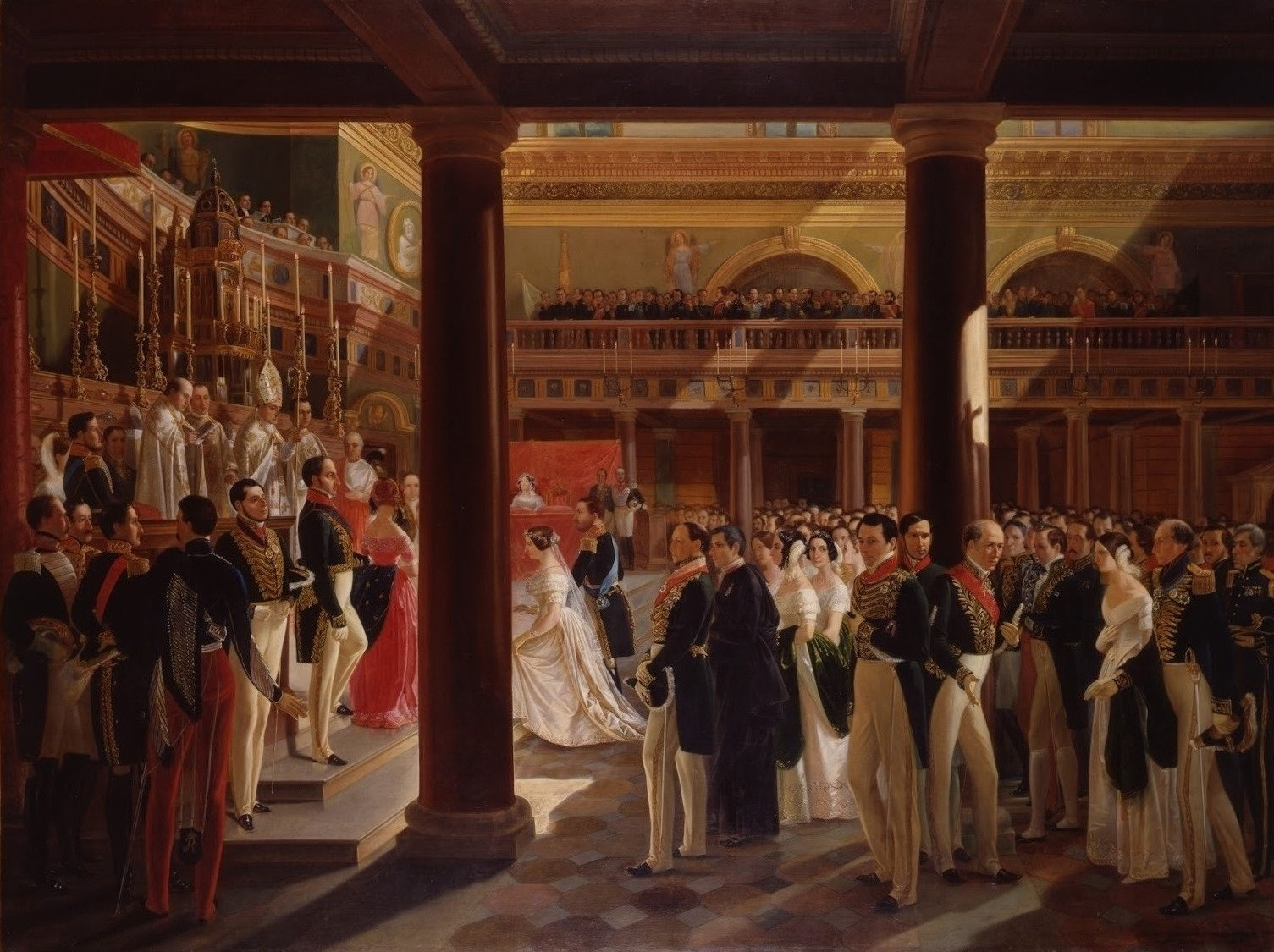
The wedding by proxy of Teresa Cristina of the Two Sicilies to Emperor Pedro II of Brazil, painted by Alejandro Ciccarelli, 1846

=== Early Modern ===
Starting in the Middle Ages, European monarchs and nobility sometimes married by proxy; by the end of the 19th century the practice had largely died out. One of the first known proxy marriages in Western history was between Clovis I King of the Franks and Clotilde, in 496.

Some other examples are:

- Frederick II, Holy Roman Emperor to Isabella II of Jerusalem, in August 1225
- John I, King of Portugal to Philippa of Lancaster, in 14 February 1387.
- Henry IV of England to Joanna of Navarre, on 2 April 2, 1402
- Lorenzo de'Medici to Clarice Orsini, in 1469
- Catherine of Aragon to Prince Arthur Tudor, on 19 May 1499
- Margaret Tudor to James IV of Scotland, on 25 January 1502
- Mary Tudor to Louis XII of France, in 1514
- Charles II, Duke of Savoy to Infanta Beatrice of Portugal, in 1521
- James VI of Scotland and I of England to Anne of Denmark, on 20 August 1589
- Anne of Austria to Louis XIII of France, on 18 October 1615
- Louis XIV of France to Maria Theresa of Spain, on 2 June 1660
- Charles I of England to Henrietta Maria of France, on 1 May 1625
- Charles V, Duke of Lorraine to Marie Jeanne Baptiste of Savoy-Nemours, in 1662. Lorraine soon refused to recognise the union and it was annulled.
- James II of England to Mary of Modena on 20 September 1673
- Marie Antoinette to Louis XVI of France, on 19 April 1770
- Napoleon I of France to Austrian Archduchess Marie Louise, in 1810
- Pedro I of Brazil to Maria Leopoldina of Austria, on 13 May 1817

In 1282, Alfonso III of Aragon married Eleanor of England (daughter of Edward I of England) by proxy; she was represented at the wedding by the English Ambassador Sir John de Vesci. The couple were legally married, but never met, as Alfonso's parents Peter III of Aragon and Constance II of Sicily were under papal interdict because of their claims to the throne of Sicily. Edward refused to send his daughter from England as long as the interdict remained in place. Alfonso died in 1291 before the issue was resolved.

In 1490, Maximilian of Habsburg (the future Holy Roman Emperor, Maximilian I) married Anne of Brittany by proxy; he was represented at the wedding by Wolfgang von Polheim. As part of the symbolism of the proxy wedding, on the wedding night Polheim went to bed with Anne but wore a full suit of armour, covering all but his right leg and hand. A sword was placed between them in the bed.

A famous 17th-century painting by Peter Paul Rubens depicts the proxy marriage of Marie de' Medici in 1600.

There are also examples of proxy marriages amongst South Asian royalty, such as Mirza Muhammad Sultan to Padishah Bibi, on 13 April 1656. In 1530, Maharana Ratan Singh II of Mewar Kingdom married a daughter of Raja Prithviraj Singh I of Amber. Singh's sword had been married as a proxy representing him, but the wedding was kept a secret. Hada prince Surajmal of Bundi was unaware and obtained her as his wife, causing unintended offence.

=== 19th century ===
The Code Napoléon in Napoleonic France and Belgium did not prohibit marriage by proxy in express terms. Article 75 of the Code required the officer of the civil status to read to the parties documents required by law concerning the mutual rights and duties of husband and wife. French and Belgian writers maintained that in the absence of an express provision in the Code declaring a marriage by proxy void that a marriage so celebrated before an officer of the civil status must be deemed valid.

In 19th century Italy, marriage by proxy was prohibited except with respect to the King and members of the Italian royal family.

=== 20th century ===
In the early 20th century, many Japanese, Okinawan, and Korean bachelors who had emigrated to the United States of America found wives from their home country through family networks, with the help of a go-between (called a nakōdo (仲人) in Japanese and a jungmae jaeng-i in Korean), and the exchange of photographs. The women became known as "picture brides". A proxy marriage would be performed with a stand in for the groom, which was considered official in the home countries. As soon as the women arrived in America, the couples were often compelled to marry again with mass wedding ceremonies held at the dock or in hotels. Between 1907 and 1923, 14,276 Japanese picture brides and 951 Korean picture brides arrived in Hawaii. The Japanese government stopped issuing passports to picture brides in the 1920s.

During the First and Second World Wars, there were many proxy marriages between soldiers serving at the front and women back at home; they often participated in the wedding ceremony via telephone. During World War I, proxy marriage was permitted by law in Belgium (from 30 May 1916), Czechoslovakia, France (from 4 April 1915), Germany, Italy (from 24 June 1915) and Norway. During the World War 2, proxy marriages were common in the United States, United Kingdom, Soviet Union and Nazi Germany where obtaining leave to return home and marry was difficult or impossible. During this period, Kansas City, Kansas, in particular was known for its permissive proxy-marriage laws; one lawyer in the city helped to arrange 39 proxy weddings.

In the United Kingdom, proxy marriage was argued for in the House of Commons by Jennie Adamson in 1943.

In Italy, between 1945 and 1976, 12,000 women were married by proxy to Italian Australian men; they would then travel to Australia to meet their new husbands. This was encouraged by the Australian church and government to address an imbalance between the sexes.

== Today ==
A unique "space wedding" took place on 10 August 2003, when Ekaterina Dmitriev, an American citizen living in the U.S. state of Texas, where the ceremony was performed, was married by proxy to Yuri Malenchenko, a cosmonaut who was orbiting the Earth in the International Space Station at the time.

As of 2015, various Internet sites were offering to arrange proxy and double-proxy marriages for a fee, although the service can generally be set up by any lawyer in a jurisdiction that permits proxy marriage. Video conferencing allows couples to experience the ceremony together.

== Legality ==
=== France ===
Article 146 of the French Civil Code does not allow for proxy marriages for the purposes of the French law of marriage.

=== Gambia ===
Proxy marriage is legal in The Gambia under sharia law.

=== Germany ===
Germany does not allow proxy marriages within its jurisdiction. It recognizes proxy marriages contracted elsewhere where this is possible, subject to the usual rules of private international law, unless the foreign law should be incompatible with German ordre public.

=== India ===
Proxy marriages via video link are legal in India, including when the parties are in separate countries, provided witnesses are present.

=== Pakistan ===
Proxy marriages, including via the telephone, are legal in Pakistan. However, witnesses must be present and the marriage correctly registered.

=== United Kingdom ===
In 2014, it was reported that "proxy marriage misuse" was common in the UK, in which an EU citizen and non-EU citizen, both living in the UK, participated in a proxy marriage in an outside country. These were sham marriages which allowed one spouse to gain EU citizenship. This was particularly the case with nikah marriages in Islam, which are conducted under Sharia (Islamic) law.

Citizens Advice Scotland warns that "it may be extremely difficult to prove that a marriage by proxy is a valid marriage, both legally and for claiming benefits."

=== United States ===
In the United States, proxy marriages are provided for in law or by customary practice in Texas, Colorado, Kansas, and Montana. Of these, Montana is the only state that allows double-proxy marriage. Proxy marriages cannot be solemnized in any other U.S. states.

In 1924, a federal court recognized the proxy marriage of a resident of Portugal, where proxy marriages were recognized at the time, and a resident of Pennsylvania, where common-law marriages could be contracted at the time. The Portuguese woman was allowed to immigrate to the United States on account of the marriage, whereas she would have been inadmissible otherwise due to being illiterate. Internet marriages have increased among some U.S. immigrant communities in recent years.

During the early 1900s, United States proxy marriages increased significantly when many Japanese picture brides arrived at Angel Island, California. Since the early 20th century, it has been most commonly used in the United States for marriages where one partner is a member of the military on active duty. In California, proxy marriage is only available to deployed military personnel. In Montana, a double-proxy marriage is available if at least one partner is either on active military duty or is a Montana resident. In the United States, if a proxy marriage has been performed in a state that legally allows it, many states will recognize it fully or will recognize it as a common law marriage. An exception to this is the state of Iowa, where it is completely unrecognized.

== Religion ==
=== Catholicism ===
Catholic canon law permits marriage by proxy, but requires officiants to receive authorization from the local ordinary before proceeding.

=== Judaism ===
Jewish law permits marriage by proxy. The process includes the groom sending the worth of a small denominational coin (Hebrew: שוה פרוטה, romanized: shəvêh prutah, lit. 'pennyworth') to the bride as discussed in tractate Kiddushin 2a:1. The Rabbis agree that it is preferable to betroth in person based on the dictum "it is more fitting that the mitzvah be performed by the man himself than by means of his agent".

הָאִישׁ מְקַדֵּשׁ בּוֹ וּבִשְׁלוּחוֹ הָאִשָּׁה מִתְקַדֶּשֶׁת בָּהּ וּבִשְׁלוּחָהּ הָאִישׁ מְקַדֵּשׁ אֶת בִּתּוֹ כְּשֶׁהִיא נַעֲרָה בּוֹ וּבִשְׁלוּחוֹ Translation: A man can betroth a woman by himself or by means of his agent. Similarly, a woman can become betrothed by herself or by means of her agent. A man can betroth his daughter to a man when she is a young woman, either by himself or by means of his agent.

=== Islam ===
Nikah marriages in Islam may be permitted by proxy, simply by both parties (or representatives on their behalf) exchanging declarations.

=== Hinduism ===
While not explicitly stated, a proxy marriage is generally not allowed in Hindu cultures due to the Saptapadi rite, where the bride and groom walk seven steps together in unison, with each step representing a vow. Under the circumstances of a proxy marriage, this step would not be possible.
