= Wolfgang von Polheim =

Austrian nobleman (1458–1512)

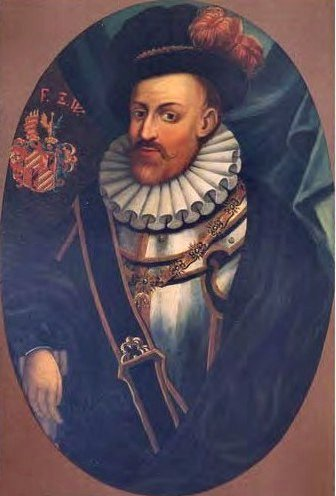
Wolfgang von Polheim

Wolfgang von Polheim (1458–1512), Lord of Polheim zu Wartenburg, Puchheim and Waldenfels, was an Austrian nobleman who was a close and life-long friend and counsellor of the Holy Roman Emperor, Maximilian I. He was given senior positions in the Habsburg administration in Austria and was closely involved in Maximilian's diplomatic initiatives abroad. In 1490, he represented Maximilian at his proxy wedding to Anne of Brittany at Rennes.

Polheim was a noted participant in jousts at tournaments, an enthusiasm he shared with Maximilian. He appears prominently, in a jousting context, in two works of art commissioned by Maximilian: the monumental woodcut, the Triumphal Procession, and in some of the miniature paintings of the Freydal tournament book.

== Biography ==
In the late Middle Ages, the von Polheims were one of the oldest and most prestigious aristocratic families of Upper Austria. Wolfgang von Polheim was born in 1458, the third son of Weikhard von Polheim, lord of Polheim and Wartenburg, and his wife Barbara von Traun. As children, he and Archduke Maximilian of Habsburg, the future Holy Roman Emperor Maximilian I, became companions and friends. Maximilian was the son and heir of the Emperor Frederick III. Frederick appointed Polheim to be councillor and chamberlain to Maximilian and he remained in Maximilian's service, and continued to be his close and trusted friend, for the rest of his life.

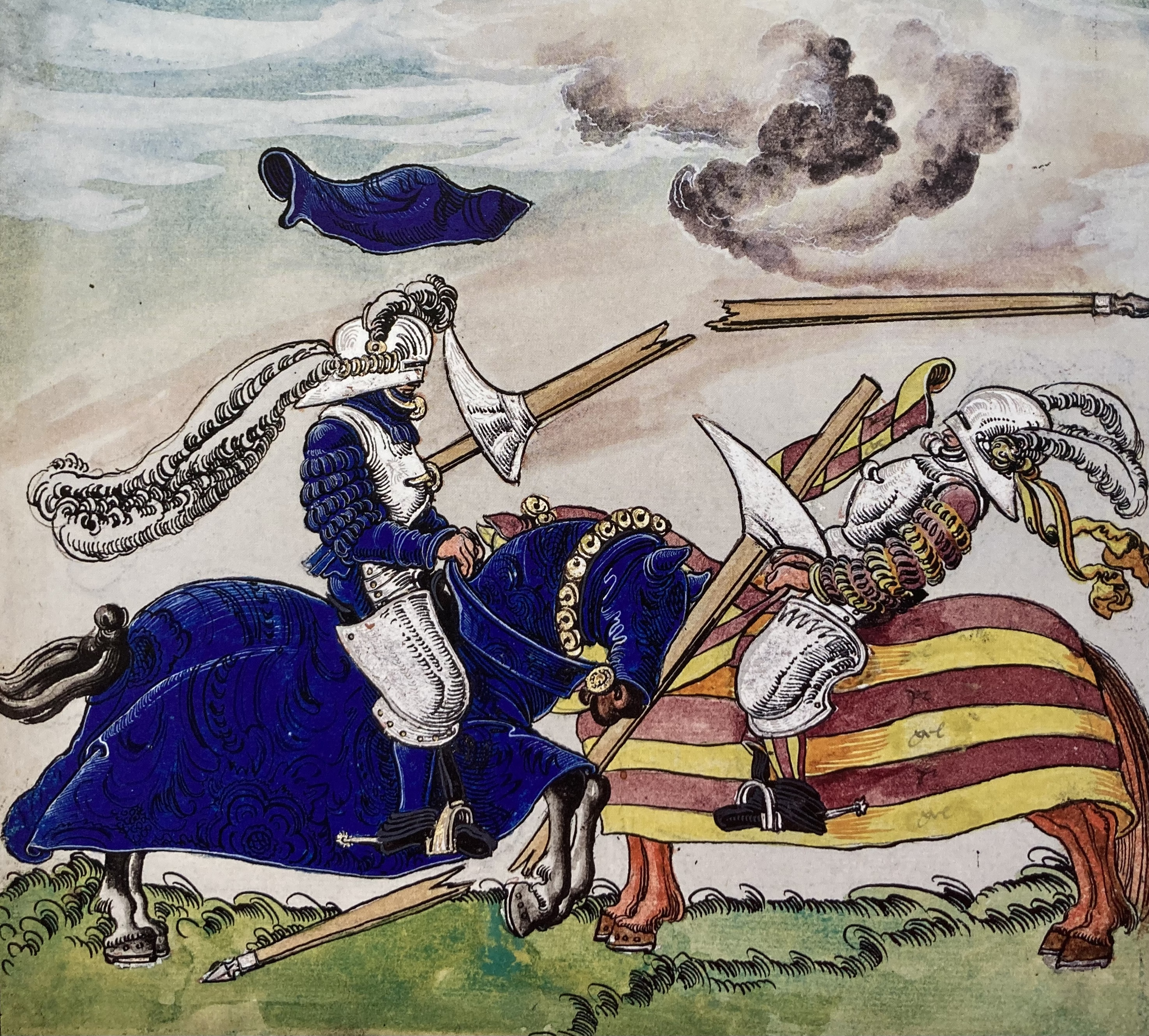
Polheim (on right) jousting with Freydal, from the Freydal tournament book, fol. 62

In 1477, Polheim accompanied Maximilian to the Low Countries for the latter's marriage at Ghent to Mary of Burgundy, heiress of Charles the Bold. For the next twelve years, Maximilian remained in the Low Countries trying to maintain his control over his wife's Burgundian inheritance in the face of French expansion and internal dissent. Polheim stayed with him. He campaigned with Maximilian to repulse Louis XI of France's attempts to seize the Burgundian territories but was taken prisoner by the French at the Battle of Guinegate in 1479. Maximilian complained about Polheim's treatment while he was a prisoner. In 1488, during one of the Flemish revolts against Maximilian, he and Polheim and several of Maximilian's other companions, were imprisoned at Bruges for 14 weeks.

After Mary's death, Maximilian arranged to marry Anne of Brittany and, in 1490, Polheim represented him at the proxy wedding ceremony in Rennes as Maximilian was not present in person. As part of the symbolism of the proxy wedding, on the wedding night Polheim went to bed with Anne but wore a full suit of armour apart from on his right leg and hand. A sword was placed between them in the bed. According to the 19th-century German historian Hans von Zwiedineck-Südenhorst, "the not entirely normal role he played in this made him well-known in all the countries of Christendom". (Note: Original in antiquated German (written in 1888): "Die nicht ganz gewöhnliche Rolle, die er dabei gespielt, hat ihn jedenfalls zu einem in allen Ländern der Christenheit vielgenannten Manne gemacht." [sic]) In 1494, Polheim himself got married, to Johanna van Borsselen, daughter of Wolfert VI van Borsselen and heiress to the lordship of Fallais.

Maximilian returned to the Habsburg central European territories in 1489/1490, and succeeded to his father's Austrian and other domains on his death in 1493. Polheim continued to serve Maximilian and was closely involved in Maximilian's diplomatic activities. During a diplomatic mission to the French court, he met the later canonised friar Francis of Paola who had founded the Order of Minims, known in Germany as the Paulaner Order. Inspired by this meeting, in 1496 Polheim founded one of the first Paulaner monasteries in Germany, near his ancestral home in Vöcklabruck, together with its monastery church of St Anna's, Oberthalheim.

In 1500 Polheim was rewarded for his service to Maximilian by being made a knight of the Order of the Golden Fleece. In 1501, he was also appointed Oberster Hauptmann (military commander) and Regent of Lower Austria. Maximilian made him an administrator of a number of imperial estates including at Frankenburg in Upper Austria where his harsh rule provoked a peasant revolt in 1511. Polheim died the following year in 1512. His tomb monument, by leading Salzburg Gothic sculptor Hans Valkenauer, is in the church he founded at Oberthalheim. His son, Cyriak (1495-1533), succeeded him as lord of Polheim zu Wartenburg and held important positions in the administrations of Maximilian's successor, the emperor Charles V and of Charles's brother, Ferdinand.

== Jousting and Maximilian's Gedechtnus ==
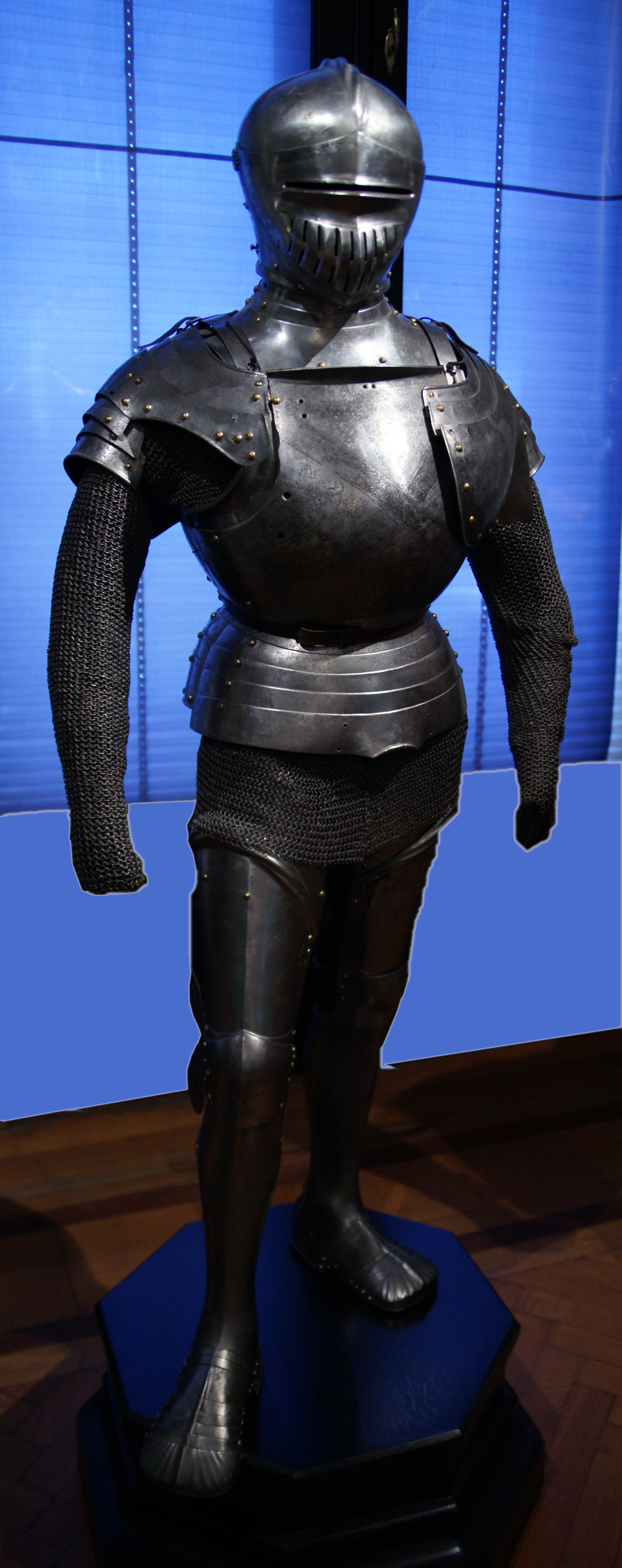
Polheim's suit of armour at the Kunsthistorisches Museum, Vienna

Polheim was an enthusiast of jousting, and the tournament he arranged at Mechelen in 1494 on the occasion of his wedding became a celebrated example of the genre. A suit of armour belonging to Polheim, and made in Innsbruck around 1510, is on display at the Kunsthistorisches Museum in Vienna.

Maximilian shared Polheim's enthusiasm. He evidently admired Polheim's jousting skills, and ensured that he played an important part in Maximilian's tournaments. Maximilian was himself a frequent participant in tournaments and Polheim is known to have jousted with Maximilian on several occasions. One contemporary source identifies 15 instances when Maximilian and Polheim jousted against each other. Many of these jousts were embellished with exuberant features. At a tournament in Ghent, they were described as jousting "in 'exploding' armour [and] painted horse armour". (Note: There were several different types of joust with varying objectives, which did not necessarily include unseating the opponent. They sometimes involved targeting specific points on the opponent's armour in order to trigger spring mechanisms with various spectacular consequences. For example, in the case of the Geschiftscheiben-Rennen (the "joust of war" with "exploding shields") the aim was to strike a large roundel shield on the chest of the other rider. If the strike was correctly made, a complicated spring mechanism caused triangular metal segments attached to the surface of the shield to "explode" into the air.) At another tournament, staged in the ducal menagerie in Brussels, Polheim jousted with a basket of eggs resting on his helmet and Maximilian wore a chained frog as a crest.

During his reign, Maximilian commissioned a number of humanist scholars and artists to assist him in completing a series of projects, in different art forms, intended to immortalize his life and deeds and those of his Habsburg ancestors. He referred to these projects as Gedechtnus ("memorial"). Jousting featured in some of these projects and, because of that, Polheim figured prominently in two of them: the Triumphal Procession and Freydal.

In the Triumphal Procession, a monumental series of woodcut prints depicting an imagined "royal entry", Polheim is given a role of particular importance. As a tournament Rennen und Gestech Meister (Note: Rennen and Gestech were two broad categories of jousting. Rennen, or “jousts of war”, are where the lance has a sharpened tip. Gestech, or “jousts of peace”, are where the lance is blunted) he holds a banner which reads (in translation):

Always promoting new advances
In jousting with hooked or pointed lances
Thanks to His Highness [Maximilian], I [von Polheim] unfurled
Skills never seen in all the world

The Freydal tournament book, one of the principal components of the Freydal project, is a series of miniature paintings depicting scenes from 64 fictional tournaments. In the paintings, Maximilian, in the guise of the eponymous hero Freydal, jousts with contemporary figures, many of whom Maximilian did, in fact, joust with in real life. Of the 191 depictions of jousts, (Note: There are, in fact, 255 paintings (originally 256) in total. However, for each of the 64 tournaments there is one painting depicting a post-tournament masquerade rather than a joust.) Polheim features in 11 of them as Freydal's opponent. Only one other opponent features as many times as Polheim.

== Bibliography ==
- Anderson, Natalie (2020). "Power and Pageantry: The Tournament at the Court of Maximilian I". In Murray, Alan V.; Watts, Karen (eds.). The Medieval Tournament as Spectacle: Tourneys, Jousts and Pas d'Armes 1100–1600. The Boydell Press. ISBN 978-1-78327-542-7.
- Brandow, Adam B.; Pfaffenbichler, Matthias (2019). "Political Struggle and Dynastic Triumph: Maximilian I and the Rise of the House of Habsburg". In Terjanian, Pierre (ed.). The Last Knight: The Art, Armor, and Ambition of Maximilian I. Metropolitan Museum of Art. ISBN 978-1-58839-674-7.
- Bridge, John S. C. (1921). A History of France From the Death of Louis XI. Vol. 1. Clarendon Press.
- Henderikx, Peter (2009). "De vorming in 1555 van het markizaat van Veere en de aard en herkomst van de aan het markizaat verbonden goederen en heerlijkheden". In Blom, Peter (ed.). Borsele Bourgondië Oranje: heren en markiezen van Veere en Vlissingen 1400–1700. Verloren. ISBN 978-90-8704-005-5.
- Hourihane, Colum, ed. (2012). "Valkenauer, Hans". The Grove Encyclopedia of Medieval Art and Architecture. Vol. 6. Oxford University Press. ISBN 978-0-19-539536-5.
- Jackson, William (2001). "Tournaments". In Jeep, John M. (ed.). Medieval Germany: An Encyclopedia. Taylor & Francis. ISBN 978-1-351-66540-7.
- Johnson, Trevor (2009). Magistrates, Madonnas and Miracles: The Counter Reformation in the Upper Palatinate. Ashgate. ISBN 978-0-7546-6480-2.
- Keen, Maurice (2012). "The Angevin Legacy, Dynastic Rivalry and the Aftermath of the Hundred Years War, 1453–1491". In Skoda, Hannah; Lantschner, Patrick; Shaw, R. L. J. (eds.). Contact and Exchange in Later Medieval Europe: Essays in Honour of Malcolm Vale. Boydell Press. ISBN 978-1-84383-738-1.
- Kleinschmidt, Harald (2008). Ruling the Waves: Emperor Maximilian I, the Search for Islands and the Transformation of the European World Picture C. 1500. Brill. ISBN 978-90-6194-020-3.
- Krause, Stefan (2014–2015). "Freydal, the Tournament Book of Emperor Maximilian I: The Washington Manuscript". National Gallery of Art, Washington D.C.
- Krause, Stefan, ed. (2019). Freydal. Medieval Games: the Book of Tournaments of Emperor Maximilian I. Taschen. ISBN 978-3-8365-7681-9.
- Metzig, Gregor M. (2016). Kommunikation und Konfrontation: Diplomatie und Gesandtschaftswesen Kaiser Maximilians I. (1486–1519). De Gruyter. ISBN 978-3-11-045673-8.
- Rebel, Hermann (2017) [1st published 1983]. Peasant Classes: The Bureaucratization of Property and Family Relations Under Early Habsburg Absolutism, 1511–1636. Princeton University Press. ISBN 978-1-4008-8649-4.
- Silver, Larry (2002). "Shining Armor: Emperor Maximilian, Chivalry and War". In Cuneo, Pia F. (ed.). Artful Armies, Beautiful Battles: Art and Warfare in the Early Modern Europe. Brill. ISBN 978-90-04-11588-0.
- Terjanian, Pierre, ed. (2019). The Last Knight: The Art, Armor, and Ambition of Maximilian I. Metropolitan Museum of Art. ISBN 978-1-58839-674-7.
- Watanabe-O'Kelly, Helen (2000). The Cambridge History of German Literature. Cambridge University Press. ISBN 978-0-521-78573-0.
- Zwiedineck-Südenhorst, Hans von (1888a). "Polheim, Wolfgang Freiherr von". In Liliencron, Rochus von (ed.). Allgemeine Deutsche Biographie. Vol. 26. Duncker & Humblot via Deutsche Biographie.
- Zwiedineck-Südenhorst, Hans von (1888b). "Polheim, Cyriak Freiherr von". In Liliencron, Rochus von (ed.). Allgemeine Deutsche Biographie. Vol. 26. Duncker & Humblot via Deutsche Biographie.
