= Ahlspiess =

Renaissance pole weapon

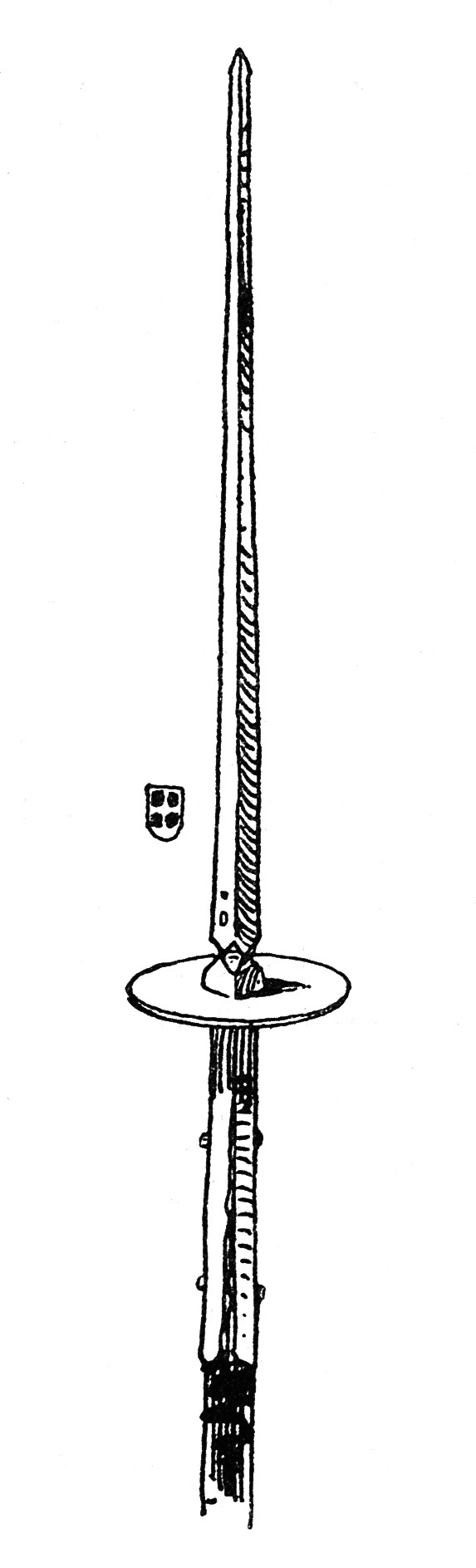
Drawing of an ahlspiess by Wendelin Boeheim

The ahlspiess (or awl pike) was a thrusting spear developed and used primarily in Germany and Austria from the 15th to 16th centuries. The ahlspiess consisted of a long thin spike of square cross section measuring up to about a metre (39 inches) in length, mounted on a round wooden shaft and sometimes secured with a pair of langets extending from the socket. The length of the shaft ranged from 1.6 to 1.8 m. (5 - 6 feet), and located at the base of the spike was a rondel guard (a circular metal plate) to protect the hands. Large numbers of these weapons have survived and are kept in the arsenal and museums of Vienna as well as the Metropolitan Museum of Art.

Some ahlspiesse have thicker spikes which are round and much shorter than the usual form. These are seen in 14th-century illustrations, suggesting that they may have been the precursors of the longer type which came later. These shorter forms are also known by the Italian term candeliere, which refers to a round candlestick of the period that had in the center a small pricket or spike that held the candle in place. An excavated and partially restored candeliere is present in the collection of the castle of Grandson in Switzerland. There were also forms of the ahlspiess which lacked a rondel guard and these were known as "breach pikes".

The ahlspiess is depicted in numerous pieces of renaissance art, including a scene from the Très Belles Heures, a French religious Book of Hours of around 1400. Another is portrayed in a woodcut from the Nuremberg Chronicle of 1493, depicting the Red Sea drowning Pharaoh's army, which is shown carrying a variety of staff weapons including halberds, flails and military forks as well as an ahlspiess. A third is from the emperor Maximilian's book Der Weisskunig of the early 16th century in an illustration entitled "The Battle Against the Blue Company" and is shown being carried by a Swiss soldier.

The ahlspiess was used in other countries as well, including England, and was a popular weapon along with the pollaxe in tournament foot combat among armoured knights.

== See also ==
- Goedendag
