= Pfleger =

Manager of a castle or abbey in the Holy Roman Empire

A pfleger (from German; lit. 'carer') was a mediaeval office holder in the Holy Roman Empire, a type of burgrave or vogt, who was responsible for the management and defence of a castle or abbey. In Bavaria there was also the title of pflegskommissär, given to someone who represented a pfleger as required (in the sense of a "commissarial" or "acting" pfleger).

In the Late Middle Ages the pfleger developed into an official with administrative and juridical tasks. In the Holy Roman Empire until its dissolution in 1806, a church parish (Kirchspiel) or a captaincy (Hauptmannschaft) was usually the lowest level of administration. In the Rhineland, however, larger parishes were sometimes subdivided into Honnschaften. Several parishes were combined into a Pflegamt, or in the Rhineland a Pflege. In charge of these offices was usually a pfleger or his representative who, as the administrative officer and proctor, looked after public law and order and recorded agreements and treaties.

For this purpose, pfleger were often recruited from the ranks of the lower nobility (vassals) in the countryside (Landadel). Sometimes there were pfleger who were promoted from the peasantry to hold office.

Formerly the sovereign exercised the functions of the legislature; on his behalf the pfleger carried out the other two functions in a given area which was e.g. the size of a present-day county or Kreis. The pfleger thus carried out the functions of today's district administrator and magistrate in personal union (in Austria-Hungary until 1918).

Pfleger was also the title given to the head of an Amt in the administrative hierarchy of the Teutonic Order. The Teutonic Order was divided into commandries, which in turn consisted of Amts. The pfleger was basically a Teutonic knight and chief administrative officer of the Amt. At a central location in the Amt there was always a Teutonic castle or Ordensburg where the pfleger had his seat.

The function of the Roman governor, Quirinius, in the province of Syria was translated by Martin Luther as Landpfleger ("[I]t happened that at the time of the Emperor Augustus, .... when Cyrenius was Landpfleger of Syria .... "). Clearly Luther assumed that at that time people would be familiar with the functions of a pfleger.
