= Leonor Teles =

Queen of Portugal from 1372 to 1383

Queen consort of Portugal
- Tenure: 5 May 1372 – 22 October 1383

Regent of Portugal
- Regency: 22 October 1383 – January 1384
- Born: c. 1350; Disputed: Trás-os-Montes, Portugal, or Castile
- Died: c. 1405 (aged 54-55); Valladolid, Castile
- Spouse: João Lourenço da Cunha Ferdinand I of Portugal (m. 1372; died 1383)
- Issue: Álvaro da Cunha; Beatrice of Portugal
- House: Meneses
- Father: Martim Afonso Telo de Meneses
- Mother: Aldonça Eanes de Vasconcelos

Leonor Teles (or Teles de Meneses; c. 1350 – c. 1405) was queen consort of Portugal by marriage to King Ferdinand I, and regent of Portugal. She was one of the protagonists, along with her brothers and her daughter Beatrice, of the events that led to the succession crisis of 1383–1385, which culminated in the defeat of her son-in-law King John I of Castile and his armies in the Battle of Aljubarrota. Called "the Treacherous" (a Aleivosa in Portuguese) by her subjects, who execrated her on account of her adultery and treason to her native country, she was dubbed by historian Alexandre Herculano as "the Portuguese Lucrezia Borgia".

== Life ==
=== Birth and childhood ===
The date or place of Leonor's and her siblings' birth is not recorded in any document. According to some sources, she was born in Trás-os-Montes because King Ferdinand I on 3 January 1375 donated Vila Real to his wife "for being a native of the province of Tralosmontes". If so, she would be the first queen of Portugal born in that country. However, her parents lived in Castile since 1340 and it was between that year and 1356 when the children of the marriage were born, as well as the illegitimate daughter; there are no sources that mention the births or the early years of the siblings. (Note: For this reason, Portuguese historian Ferro Tavares suspects that the place of her birth was actually in Castilian territory, and that it was changed on purpose. According to this hypothesis, the birthplace was moved to a Portuguese location in order to stress the political detachment King Ferdinand I made from the Franco-Castilian diplomatic bloc in the Hundred Years' War with such a marriage. This situation is complicated by the fact that Leonor's family held lands and tenancies in Portuguese territory, which makes the thesis of Trás-os-Montes still viable.)

=== Family ===
A member of the lineage of the Teles de Meneses, an important family originally from Tierra de Campos, Leonor's father Martim Afonso Telo de Meneses, a Portuguese nobleman, mayordomo mayor and alleged lover of Maria of Portugal, the wife of King Alfonso XI of Castile, was assassinated in 1356 by orders of King Peter. Leonor's mother was Aldonça Eanes de Vasconcelos, daughter and heiress of João Mendes de Vasconcelos and Aldara Afonso Alcoforado.

Leonor had three full-siblings: two brothers—João Afonso Telo (6th Count of Barcelos, mayor of Lisbon in 1372 and admiral of the Portuguese kingdom around 1375, who died in the Battle of Aljubarrota) and Gonçalo Teles de Meneses (Count of Neiva and Lord of Faria)—and a sister—Maria Teles de Meneses, who was married first to Álvaro Dias de Sousa and then to John of Portugal, an illegitimate half-brother of Leonor's husband King Ferdinand I. Maria was murdered in 1379 by her second husband, who accused her of adultery; historians suspect that Leonor, fearing for the succession of her daughter Beatrice and her own position as regent, was involved in the crime. Maria was a lady-in-waiting of her future sister-in-law Beatrice of Portugal, and introduced Leonor to King Ferdinand I, who fell passionately in love with her, when she visited her sister in court.

Leonor also had an illegitimate paternal half-sister, Juana Teles de Meneses. Leonor arranged her marriage to Juan Alfonso Pimentel, first Count of Benavente, who supported the cause of the Castilian king during the succession crisis and went into exile in Castile.

Leonor was also the niece of João Afonso Telo, fourth Count of Barcelos and first Count of Ourém, whose daughter, Leonor, was the wife of Pedro de Castro "The One-eyed", son of Álvaro Pires de Castro, Count of Arraiolos, Lord of Cadaval and Ferreira, Constable of Portugal, and brother of Inês de Castro, mistress (and alleged secret wife) of King Peter I of Portugal. The Teles de Meneses and the Castros were among the most powerful and influential families in the kingdoms of Leon, Castile and Portugal.

=== Queen of Portugal ===
==== Marriage to Ferdinand I ====
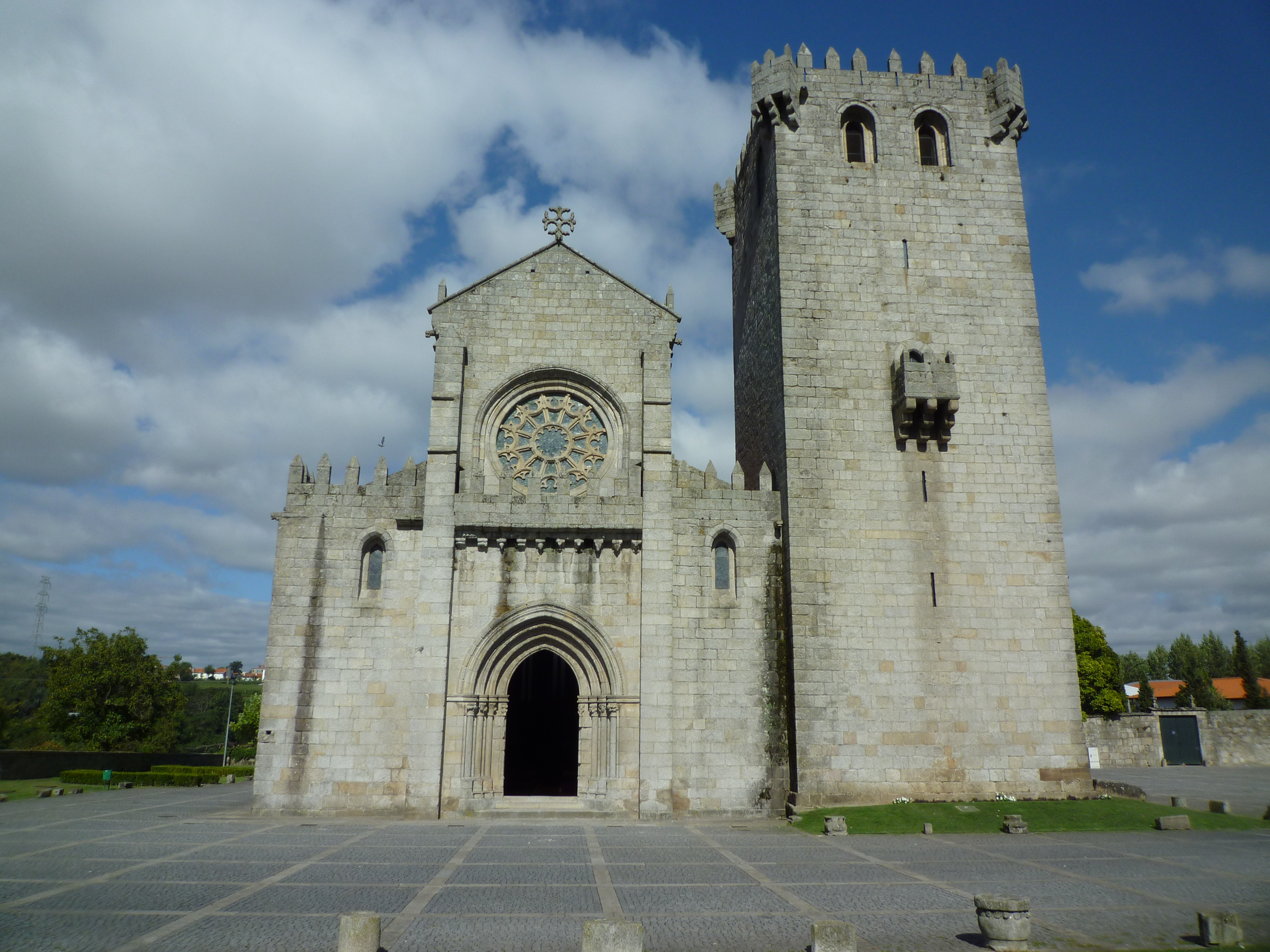
Church and tower of the monastery in Leça do Balio where King Ferdinand and Leonor were married in 1372

In 1365, Leonor had wed João Lourenço da Cunha, 2nd Lord of Pombeiro, to whom she was still married when she met King Ferdinand I of Portugal. Two children were born of her union with João Lourenço: a daughter who died in infancy, and a son, Álvaro da Cunha, heir to the lordship of his father. According to the later chronicler Fernão Lopes, Leonor abandoned her son when she married King Ferdinand I, making him pose as the son of Lope Dias de Sousa and a "woman member of his household named Elvira", calling him Álvaro de Sousa, so that she could "pretend to be a virgin for the king, saying that her husband had never slept with her". (Note: Lope Dias de Sousa was the brother of Álvaro Dias de Sousa, the first husband of Leonor's sister, Maria Teles. In his last will, João Lourenço da Cunha, Leonor's first husband, left his properties and title to his son Álvaro da Cunha, the son whom "he had never dared to mention during the lifetime of King Ferdinand". King Ferdinand had confiscated his properties in 1379. He left his country and only returned to Portugal after the death of King Ferdinand. Upon his return, he received several donations from the Master of Aviz, who he betrayed. João Lourenço da Cunha died around 1385 or shortly afterwards.) King Ferdinand I subsequently attempted to obtain the annulment of Leonor's first marriage on the grounds of consanguinity, in order to preserve the legitimacy of their daughter, Beatrice of Portugal. The jurist João das Regras claimed, in one of the arguments he made before the Cortes of Coimbra in 1385 after King Ferdinand I died, that Leonor was not free to marry another man because the needed papal dispensation had not been secured (a fact that the king concealed) and her mother's first marriage was therefore valid, meaning Beatrice was illegitimate. The Cortes determined that, since all pretenders to the throne, that is, the sons of Inês de Castro and the master of Aviz, were illegitimate, the dynastic line had been severed and the people, through their representatives, could choose a new king.

Before marrying Leonor, several marriage negotiations were made for the infante, who became King Ferdinand I. In 1358 a marriage between him and Beatrice, the first-born daughter of King Peter I of Castile, was considered but never took place. In 1364 the marriage of Ferdinand to Infanta Joanna of Aragon, daughter of King Peter IV was negotiated, and years later, by the end of 1369, a marriage to another daughter of the Aragonese king, Infanta Eleanor was also pursued, but neither of these marriages came to pass. In 1371 King Ferdinand I suffered a defeat when he invaded Galicia; one of the stipulations of the Treaty of Alcoutim was his marriage to Infanta Eleanor, daughter of King Henry II of Castile. Any of these marriages would have pleased the Portuguese people, although the last one, according to the stipulations in the Treaty of Alcoutim, could imply "a threat to the sovereignty of the Portuguese Kingdom". The king secretly married Leonor in the second half of 1371, breaking his engagement with the Castilian infanta. On 5 May 1372, the official wedding was celebrated away from the court in the small town of Leça do Balio. From the beginning, John and Denis of Portugal, the sons of Inês de Castro and half-brothers of the king, showed their rejection of this marriage, as well as the "rise of Leonor and her relatives".

King Ferdinand had given Leonor in the arras charter of January 1372 several cities, all associated with the lordships of the queens of Portugal, among them Abrantes, Alenquer, Torres Vedras, Vila Viçosa, Almada, Sintra, Atouguia, Óbidos, Sacavém, Frielas and Unhos, which also included their houses, ports, fishmongers, royal rights, and other goods, and in April of the same year he also gave her Aveiro. The king was generous to Leonor because she had not brought any dowry to the marriage, since legally, the wife lost her dowry in favor of the deserted husband, and "her family had not yet recovered financially from the loss of the first dowry". In 1374, Leonor exchanged Vila Viçosa for Vila Real de Trás-os-Montes and in 1376 she bought Pinhel.

In February 1373, during the brief siege that the Castilian troops imposed on the city in the second Fernandine War, Leonor gave birth in Coimbra to her first child with the king, a daughter called Beatrice. Three years later, in 1376, Beatrice was affirmed as heiress to the throne in the Cortes of Leiria. In his testament dated 1378, King Ferdinand I disinherited his half-siblings, the children of Inês de Castro (John, Denis and Beatrice, frequently called the Infantes Castro), whom he accused of an attempt to poison him with the help of Diogo Lopes Pacheco.

After several failed betrothals, the marriage of the Portuguese king's daughter to John I of Castile was negotiated by Juan Fernández Andeiro. Pursuant to the clauses of the marriage contract, both kingdoms would remain separate, Leonor would be regent and the throne would be inherited by the son born to Beatrice and John I, who would be educated in Portugal from the age of three months and would assume the throne when he turned fourteen years old.

==== Government and discontent ====
Leonor began to participate actively in the kingdom's government immediately after her marriage:

"Although there was popular discontent because the queen was the absolute owner of the government and with her the Castilians [...] Portugal entered into a process of prosperity [...] thanks to the promotion of agriculture, trade and the creation of the fleet which, along with the superb walls of Lisbon, were the glories of that reign. (rough translation from Portuguese)

The people's rejection of the queen was due partly to the governmental posts offered by Leonor to the emperegilados, or "Petrists", the name given to the supporters of King Peter I of Castile against his half-brother, King Henry II; one of these was the Galician Juan Fernández Andeiro. In 1369, during the First Fernandine War, Andeiro was one of the "Petrists" who received Ferdinand I in La Coruña when, after the death of Peter I, the Portuguese king, as the great-grandson of King Sancho IV of Castile, proclaimed himself heir of the Castilian throne and invaded Galicia. In 1380, Andeiro was at the English court as emissary of Ferdinand I on a diplomatic mission. He disembarked on his return to Portugal in Porto, and then went to Estremoz to meet the Portuguese king, but shortly after his arrival he had to hide in a tower for several days, because, according to the provisions of the Treaty of Alcoutim signed in 1371 after the First Fernandine War, all the supporters of Peter I of Castile were to be expelled from Portugal. It was during his stay in Estremoz, according to the later chronicler Fernão Lopes, that a love affair began between Juan Fernández Andeiro and Leonor, although the sources used by the chronicler for this assertion are unknown. From 1381 to 1383, Andeiro was one of the closest advisors of Ferdinand I and Leonor.

While the king and his counselors were in Elvas to discuss a new war with Castile, on 19 July 1382, Leonor gave birth to a son who lived only four days, dying under mysterious circumstances; some observers say it was due to the sultry weather in the Alentejo region during that summer, while others, including Fernão Lopes, said that Ferdinand I, suspecting the infidelity of his wife, had thought the child was the son of Andeiro and in a fit of anger suffocated the newborn prince in his cradle. Fernão Lopes also states that the court dressed in mourning only for protocol, since most of the courtiers thought the prince was not the king's son.

==== Crisis of the regency ====
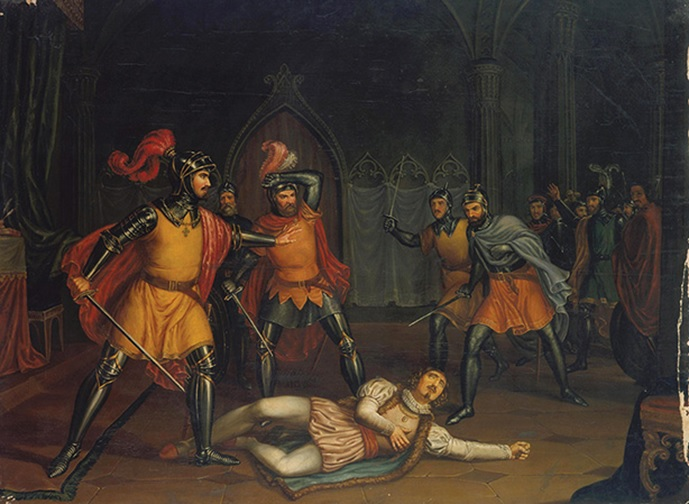
A morte do Conde Andeiro (The death of Count Andeiro) (c. 1860) José de Sousa Azevedo. Museu Nacional Soares dos Reis (Porto).

On 27 September 1383 Leonor gave birth to a daughter who lived only a few days; as in the previous case, it was also rumored that, due to King Ferdinand's long illness, he was not the infant's father. One month later, on 22 October, the Portuguese monarch died, either of tuberculosis or of gradual poisoning. Leonor did not attend the funeral, according to the chronicler Fernão Lopes, "saying that she felt ill, and could not be there", because of her recent childbirth, or according to other commentators, "fearing the murmur of the people."

Advised by the emperegilados, Leonor assumed the regency in the name of her daughter, recently married to the Castilian king, following the terms of the marriage contract of Beatrice and King John I, under which it was stipulated that at the death of the king of Portugal, the dowager queen would be the regent and governor of the kingdom.

There were two parties, one that supported the pretensions of King John I of Castile and the other, represented by the bourgeoisie of Lisbon, whose objective was to expel the foreigners from the government so that the kingdom would be governed only by the Portuguese. This party proposed the marriage of the dowager queen with the master of Aviz, the future King John I of Portugal, but Leonor rejected this proposal. In Lisbon, supporters of the master of Aviz who refused to recognize Beatrice as queen for fear of Portugal's loss of independence, organized a conspiracy to assassinate Juan Fernández Andeiro. The first two attempts (one of them was organized by Leonor's brother, João Afonso Telo) failed. The third and last attempt took place on 6 December 1383. The master of Aviz gave him a thrust and once on the ground, Rui Pereira killed him. This happened in the royal palace next to Leonor's chamber. The master apologized for what had happened and asked her to prevent the Castilian king from entering the kingdom of Portugal. Leonor demanded that Andeiro be buried with dignity and said to him, "And haven't you got any pity for that man lying there dead in such dishonor? Just for the sake of being a nobleman like you, take pity on him and have him buried; don't let him lie there so". He ignored her plea and Leonor was personally responsible for the burial of her friend that night in the Church of Saint Martin.

In January 1384 Leonor asked her son-in-law, King John I, to help her avenge the death of Andeiro. Chronicler Pero López de Ayala related the event as follows:

When King John I was in La Guardia at the beginning of 1384, he received a message from Leonor telling him how the master of Avis had killed the Count of Ourém (Fernandez de Andeiro) and the Bishop of Lisbon in her presence. She had gone to Santarém, understanding that those in Lisbon did not want her or Beatrice there, but she had powerful brothers and relatives in Portugal, as well as possession of the town of Santarém. She asked him to come and so he did [...] She gave him the fortresses of the town and renounced her rule in favor of the king, which according to the terms of his marriage contract, she had to hold until the king of Castile had a son with Beatrice.

John I asked Leonor to renounce the regency. Although some of the dowager queen's advisers tried to dissuade her and warned her of the danger and illegality of the act, since she could not renounce a government that "had been attributed and sworn in the Cortes" and that only the Cortes could authorize, Leonor remained firm in her purpose and ordered the drafting of the instrument of resignation. After the transfer of powers in January 1384, John I of Castile began to use the title of "King of Portugal", combined the royal coat of arms of both Castile and Portugal, and began to confirm royal charters without mentioning his wife, Queen Beatrice, as "John, by the grace of God, king of Castile, Leon, Portugal, Toledo and Galicia (D. João, pela graça de deus, Rei de Castela, Leão, Portugal, Toledo e Galiza).

Shortly afterwards, Leonor distanced herself from her son-in-law, because, among other reasons, the king did not appoint one of her favorites as the Chief Rabbi of the Jews of Castile. The dowager queen began to ask those who supported her to defend the master of Aviz and not the king of Castile, and also wrote to the cities that the Castilian king intended to occupy to refuse their obedience to him. When the king marched to Coimbra, accompanied by his wife and mother-in-law, the city was already under the protection of Gonçalo Teles, Leonor's brother, as well as her uncle Gonçalo Mendes de Vasconcelos. Leonor participated in a conspiracy to kill her son-in-law and, according to the chronicler Fernão Lopes, was discovered in the presence of her daughter Beatrice, who confronted her mother saying: "Oh Lady mother, in a year you wanted to see me a widow, orphan and disinherited?"

==== Exile in Castile ====
Once Leonor's conspiracies were discovered in March 1384 and she was "blamed as an intriguer", John I "took the advice of those who said that the queen should be arrested and sent to Castile and ordered that she must be taken to the monastery in Tordesillas" where "widowed queens and daughters of kings had resided previously".

How Queen Leonor was taken to Castile: The king asked for the advice of his councilors, saying that it seemed right to him to imprison the queen his mother-in-law and send her to a monastery in Castile, and not to allow her to remain in Portugal any longer, because of what had happened [...] the advice given by his council was that she should be arrested and taken to Castile, consequently she was delivered to Diego López de Estúñiga. When the king left Coimbra and went to Santarém, he took the queen with him, and from there she was taken to Castile and placed in the Royal Convent of Santa Clara in Tordesillas. (Non-literal translation from Portuguese)

Upon hearing the plans of her son-in-law, John I, Leonor defied him, saying, "you can do it to a sister if you have one; make her a nun in that nunnery if you will; but of me you will never make a nun, nor will your eyes ever see that". Leonor was escorted to Castile and never returned to Portugal. She remained in the Royal Convent of Santa Clara until the death of King John I of Castile. By 1391, she had settled in one of the lordships of her daughter Beatrice, Valladolid, where many Portuguese nobles had been exiled after the Battle of Aljubarrota in 1385. She bought some houses in the neighborhood of San Juan where, as stipulated in her will, a convent was to be founded. Fernán López de la Serna, the executor of her will, founded the monastery, which was called Nuestra Señora de la Merced de la Calzada, on her behalf. According to Juan Antolínez de Burgos, during this time Leonor had an affair with a certain Zoilo Íñiguez, with whom she had a son who died in infancy, and a daughter named Maria who later married a nephew of Fernán López de la Serna, who was also the child's tutor. Also, according to tradition, Leonor was present in Valladolid at the same time as her first husband, but there is no evidence to confirm that there was any relationship between them. (Note: According to the legends and traditions of Valladolid collected by Juan Agapito y Revilla, a 19th – 20th century architect and local chronicler, João Lourenço da Cunha fled from the Portuguese court and found refuge in Valladolid where he lived the rest of his life and where he walked around the city wearing a hat with a string to which were attached silver horns manifesting his condition as a cuckold. This is in contradiction with Portuguese sources according to which, after the death of King Ferdinand, he returned to Portugal where he received several donations from the master of Aviz who, at João Lourenço's behest, on 17 April 1385, issued a letter confirming that Álvaro, up to then considered a bastard son of Lope Dias de Sousa, was actually his son whose real name was Álvaro da Cunha. João Lourenço da Cunha died in Portugal in 1385 or shortly afterwards, according to Portuguese sources. Historian Olivera Serrano does not give credence to these stories, considering them purely local legends and traditions without any supporting evidence, including Leonor's alleged affair with Zoilo Íñiguez.)

Leonor's daughter Beatrice was residing in the city of Toro, not far from Valladolid. It is not known if mother and daughter had any contact there, as Beatrice had been grievously hurt by her mother's conspiracy to murder her husband, and in turn, Leonor purported to be offended because her daughter "did not support her when her husband, in bad faith, dispossessed her of the regency", although when this happened, Beatrice was only eleven years old.

=== Death and burial ===
There are no documentary sources to confirm the exact year of her death—probably 1405—or of the place where she was buried. Portuguese historian Joze Barbosa, in his work Catalogo das Rainhas de Portugal, said that she died on 27 April 1386 in Tordesillas and that she was buried in a convent in Valladolid, without specifying which one. However, there is evidence that Leonor was still alive in 1390 when her son-in-law, King John I of Castile, in the Cortes that were held that year in Guadalajara, included her in the expenses of his household. In the same year, after the death of the Castilian monarch, Leonor left Tordesillas and settled in Valladolid. In his last will executed in July 1385, King John I entrusted his son, the future Henry III of Castile, with the responsibility of always honoring his wife Beatrice and his mother-in-law Leonor Teles. When Henry III executed his will on 4 December 1406, he mentioned Beatrice but not Leonor and, consequently, it can be assumed that she had already died.

Her desire to be buried in the Convent of Saint Francis in Santarém next to her husband, King Ferdinand, was not fulfilled. Juan Antolínez de Burgos, a 16th – 17th century author who wrote a book on the history of Valladolid, states, without citing any sources, that Leonor was buried in the convent of Nuestra Señora de la Merced in Valladolid where Leonor lived after abandoning Tordesillas. (Note: The same author, Antolínez de Burgos, also claimed that João Afonso, an illegitimate son of King Denis of Portugal, was also buried in the same convent as stipulated in his will dated 1422 when he was 98 years old asking to be buried "at the feet of my lady, Queen Leonor". This assertion is impossible since João Afonso was born around 1295, first appears in court in 1303 when his father the king gave him some properties, was legitimized in 1317 two years after his marriage, and was killed by his half-brother King Afonso IV of Portugal on 4 July 1326. The other possibility, that this João Afonso was the son of Denis, Lord of Cifuentes, son of King Peter I of Portugal and Inês de Castro is also unlikely since there are no records that Denis had a son by that name.)

During refurbishment work in 1626, a niche was found with two coffins that supposedly contained the remains of Leonor and her son. A plaque was later placed, dated 1384, which identifies the place as the burial of both. The date is wrong because Leonor's date of death is unknown, although it had to be between 1390—when King John I of Castile included her in the expenses of his household—and 1406—when his son King Henry III executed his last will mentioning his stepmother Beatrice, but not her mother Leonor.

== Bibliography ==
- Agapito y Revilla, Juan (1915). "Tradiciones de Valladolid. Una reina de Portugal". Sociedad Castellana de Excursiones (Año XIII, num. 154). Digital copy. Valladolid. Junta de Castilla y León. Consejería de Cultura y Turismo. Valladolid: Imprentas de Juan R. Hernando: 220–223. OCLC 921858261.
- Braamcamp Freire, Anselmo (1921). Livro primeiro dos Brasões de Sintra (in Portuguese). Coimbra: Imprensa da Universidade. OCLC 794223590.
- Castro Toledo, Jonas (1981). Colección Diplomática de Tordesillas (in Spanish). Valladolid: Instituto cultural Simancas. ISBN 84-500-4849-4.
- Fernandes, Fátima Regina (2000). "Os exilados castelhanos no reinado de Fernando I de Portugal". En la España Medieval (in Portuguese). 23. Madrid: Universidad Complutense: Servicio de Publicaciones y Departamento de Historia Medieval: En la España medieval, n° 23: 101–115. ISSN 0214-3038.
- Ferro Tavares, Maria José (2013). Fernando e Leonor: Um Reinado (Mal)dito. Lisboa: Chiado Editora. ISBN 978-989-51-0420-8.
- Garcia de Pina, Isabel M. (2008). Leonor Teles, uma mulher de poder? (PDF) (in Portuguese). Universidade de Lisboa, Faculdade de Letras, Departamento de História. Tesis doctoral.
- Hutchinson, Amélia P. (2004). "Leonor Teles: Representations of a Portuguese Queen". Historical Reflections / Réflexions Historiques. 30. Historical Guineveres and Literary Eleanors: "Narratizing" Medieval Women's Lives (1). New York: Berghahn Books: 73–87. ISSN 1939-2419. JSTOR 41299297.
- Lopes, Fernão (1895–1896). Chronica de el-rei D. Fernando (in Portuguese). Vol. III. Lisbon: Escriptorio. Serie: Bibliotheca de classicos portugueses. OCLC 2634915.
- Lopes, Fernão (1896). Chronica de el-rei D. Fernando (in Portuguese). Vol. III. Lisbon: Escriptorio. Serie: Bibliotheca de classicos portugueses.
- Lopes, Fernão (1897) [First published in 1644]. Mello d’Azevedo (ed.). Chronica de El-Rei D. João I: First Part – Vol. I, II and III (in Portuguese). Lisbon: Escriptorio:Bibliotheca de Classicos Portuguezes. OCLC 831167525.
- Lopes, Fernão (1897–1898) [First published in 1644]. Mello d’Azevedo (ed.). Chronica de El-Rei D. João I: Second Part – Vol. IV (1897) and V, VI and VII (1898) (in Portuguese). Lisbon: Escriptorio:Bibliotheca de Classicos Portuguezes. OCLC 831167525.
- López de Ayala, Pedro (1780). Imprenta de don Antonio Sancha (ed.). Crónicas de los Reyes de Castilla (in Spanish). Vol. II, que contiene las de Don Enrique II, D. Juan I y D. Enrique III (con las enmiendas de Eugenio de Llaguno Amirola). Madrid.
- Morse Stephens, Henry (1903). "The Reign of Ferdinand". Portugal. Putnam.
- Oliveira e Costa, João Paulo (2013). Episódios da Monarquia Portuguesa (in Portuguese). Lisbon: Cículos de Leitores e Temas e Debates. ISBN 978-989-644-248-4.
- Olivera Serrano, César (2005). Beatriz de Portugal. La pugna dinástica Avís-Trastámara (PDF) (in Spanish). CSIC. ISBN 9788400083434.
- Pina Baleiras, Isabel de (2013). Uma rainha inesperada: Leonor Teles (in Portuguese). Lisbon: Temas e Debates. ISBN 978-989-644-230-9.
- Rodrigues Oliveira, Ana (2010). Rainhas medievais de Portugal. Dezassete mulheres, duas dinastias, quatro séculos de História (in Portuguese). Lisbon: A esfera dos livros. ISBN 978-989-626-261-7.
- Sotto Mayor Pizarro, José Augusto (1997). Linhagens Medievais Portuguesas: Genealogias e Estratégias (1279-1325) (in Portuguese). Porto: Doctorate thesis, author’s edition. hdl:10216/18023.
- Sotto Mayor Pizarro, José Augusto P. (1987). Os Patronos do Mosteiro de Grijo: Evolução e Estrutura da Familia Nobre Séculos XI a XIV (in Portuguese). Vol. I. Porto.

Leonor Teles House of Meneses Born: c. 1350 Died: c. 1405
Portuguese royalty
Vacant Title last held by Beatrice of Castile	Queen consort of Portugal; 5 May 1372 – 22 October 1383	Vacant Title next held by Philippa of Lancaster
Political offices
Vacant Title last held by Afonso, Count of Boulogne	Regent of Portugal; 22 October 1383 – January 1384	Succeeded by John, Master of Avis
