= Beatrice of Portugal =

Queen of Portugal (disputed) & Castile (1373–c.1420)

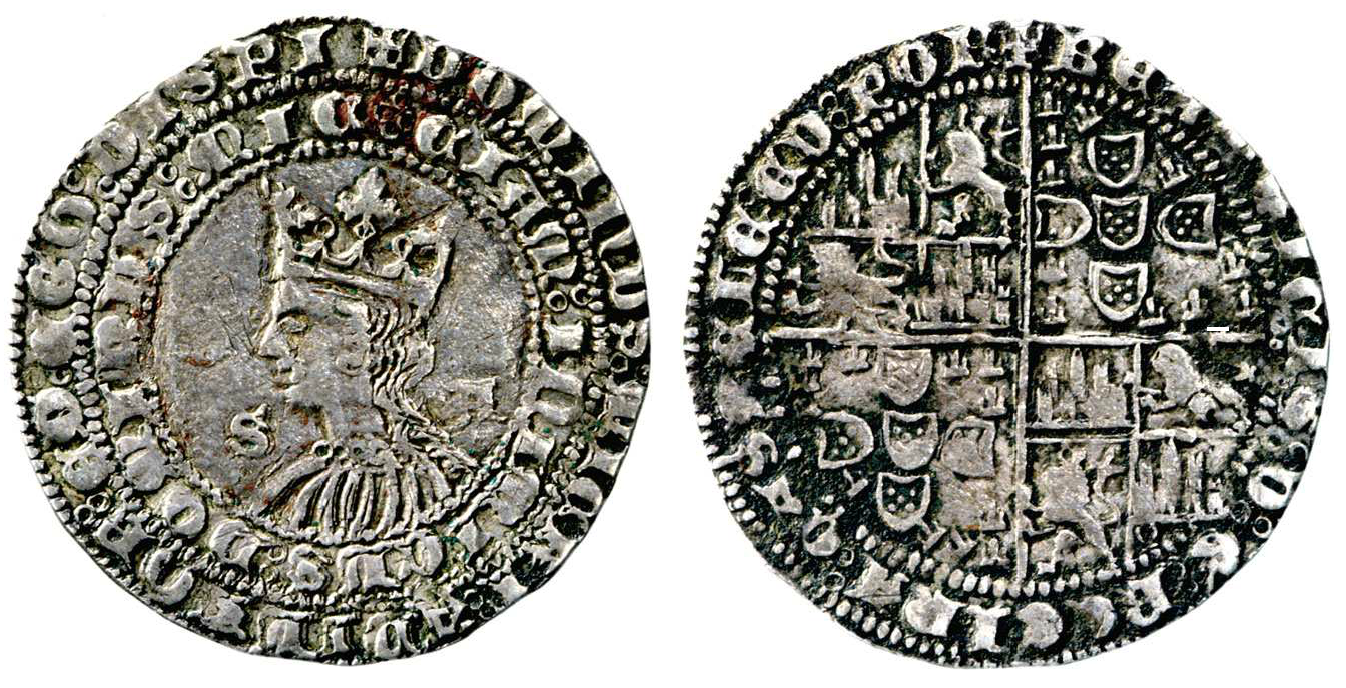
- A "real" coin bearing the effigy of Beatrice of Portugal

Queen consort of Castile and León
- Tenure: 17 May 1383 – 9 October 1390

Queen of Portugal
- Reign: 1383–1385
- Predecessor: Ferdinand I
- Successor: John I
- Regent: Leonor Teles (1383–1384)
- Born: 7–13 February 1373; Coimbra, Portugal
- Died: c. 1420 (aged 46–47); Castile
- Burial: Monastery of Sancti Spiritus, Toro, Castile
- Spouse: John I of Castile (m. 1383; died 1390)
- House: Burgundy
- Father: Ferdinand I of Portugal
- Mother: Leonor Teles

Beatrice (Portuguese: Beatriz, pronounced [bi.ɐˈtɾiʃ]; 7–13 February 1373 – c. 1420) was the only surviving legitimate child of King Ferdinand I of Portugal and Leonor Teles. She became Queen consort of Castile by marriage to King John I of Castile. Following her father's death without a legitimate male heir, she claimed the Portuguese throne but lost her claim to her uncle, who became King John I of Portugal, founder of the House of Aviz.

During her early years, Beatrice was a pawn in the changing politics of foreign alliances of her father, who negotiated successive marriages for her. She would eventually marry King John I of Castile, by whom Beatrice became Queen Consort of Castile. At the death of her father, she was proclaimed Queen regnant of Portugal and her mother assumed the regency in her name. Opposition to the regency, fear of the Castilian domination and loss of Portuguese independence led to a popular rebellion and civil war between the late King Ferdinand I's illegitimate brother, John of Aviz, who wrested control of the regency from the dowager queen, and the supporters of Beatrice and her husband, John I of Castile, who claimed the throne of Portugal by right of his wife. In 1385, John of Aviz was proclaimed King of Portugal, and the King of Castile was definitively defeated in the Battle of Aljubarrota, effectively ending any prospects for Beatrice and her husband to assert their rights to the Portuguese crown.

From that time, Queen Beatrice took a special interest in the welfare of the Portuguese exiles in Castile who had been faithful to her dynastic claim to the Portuguese throne. After the death of her husband, she was relegated to a secondary level in the Castilian court. However, the dynastic strife continued to represent a challenge to the normalization of relations between Castile and Portugal. From the second decade of the 15th century onwards, her documentary trail became scarce until she completely disappeared about 1420.

== Life ==
=== Early years and betrothals ===
Beatrice was born in Coimbra, during the brief siege of the city by Castilian troops during the second Fernandine War (1372–73). The siege was lifted and King Henry II of Castile continued to Santarém and then Lisbon. During the siege of Lisbon, Cardinal legate Guido of Bologna obtained an agreement between the Kings of Castile and Portugal, the Peace of Santarém. According to that treaty, King Ferdinand I of Portugal would abandon the Petrist cause, his claim to dynastic legitimacy that originated after the assassination of King Peter I of Castile in 1369. Two marriages were celebrated between the two royal families to reinforce the peace: between Sancho Alfonso, 1st Count of Alburquerque, brother of Henry, and Beatrice, half-sister of Ferdinand, and between Alfonso Enríquez, Henry's natural son, and Ferdinand's illegitimate daughter Isabel. In addition, a betrothal was arranged between Beatrice, Ferdinand I of Portugal's newborn daughter, and Fadrique, created Duke of Benavente, another natural son of King Henry II of Castile.

The Cortes de Leiria of 1376 pledged to support Beatrice as heiress of the throne, accepting her betrothal with the Duke of Benavente. The betrothal was solemnized in Leiria on 24 November 1376, and on 3 January 1377 was accepted by King Henry II.

Fernando I's will of 1378 ratified all agreements concerning Beatrice, adding that in the absence of Beatrice or any descendants, the Portuguese king's half-brothers, the children of Inês de Castro (John, Diniz and Beatrice) were disinherited, and the throne of Portugal would pass to any hypothetical sisters of Beatrice, and after them, to Duke Fadrique of Benavente. To ensure the succession of the throne in her daughter, Queen Leonor Teles devised a plot against John of Portugal, in which the Queen's own sister María Teles, John's wife, was accused of adultery and killed by her husband in June 1379. Although John later obtained the royal pardon, he opted to flee to Castile, fearful of the Teles family.

In May 1379 King Henry II of Castile died and his son John I succeeded him. Once these events were known in the Portuguese court, negotiations began for the betrothal of Beatrice with the first-born son of the new King, the future Henry III of Castile, in order to counter any aspiration of John of Portugal to the throne with the political and military support of the Castilians. The 21 May 1380 agreement stipulated that the wedding would be celebrated when the 1-year-old prince reached the age of 14. It also established the succession. If Beatrice died before the marriage and her father had no more legitimate offspring, the throne would pass to John I of Castile, but if she died after her marriage and without any descendants, it would go to her widower. If Henry died first, without issue by Beatrice, she would remain Queen regnant, but were she then to die without children by a subsequent marriage, the Portuguese throne would pass to the Kings of Castile. In this way the children of Inês de Castro were again denied succession. The marriage agreement was approved in the Cortes de Soria in August 1380.

By July 1380, Ferdinand I had changed his politics by secretly allying himself in the Treaty of Estremoz with King Richard II of England and the Duke of Lancaster, defenders of the Petrist cause. The King of Portugal abandoned Antipope Clement VII and swore obedience to Pope Urban VI, while his daughter Beatrice was betrothed to Edward of Norwich, son of the Earl of Cambridge and grandson of King Peter I of Castile. The negotiations for this alliance brought to Portugal a Petrist exile, Juan Fernández de Andeiro, Count of Ourém, who would later have prominent influence at the Portuguese court. When the Castilian King heard of the agreement thanks to the exiled John of Portugal, he sealed an alliance with France through the Treaty of Vincennes, accepting obedience of his kingdom to the Antipope Clement VII, and he undertook the third Fernandine War. While King Ferdinand I and his counselors were at Elvas to discuss the war, on 19 July 1382 Queen Leonor Teles gave birth a son who lived only four days. One month later, on 10 August, the war was concluded with the Peace of Elvas, under which a betrothal was celebrated between Beatrice and the second son of John I of Castile, the future Ferdinand I of Aragon. In addition, the Kingdom of Portugal, religiously divided by the Western Schism, returned to the obedience of Antipope Clement.

John I of Castile was widowed in 1382, and the Count of Ourém, favorite of Queen Leonor Teles, negotiated a new betrothal for Beatrice, this time with the Castilian King himself. Ferdinand agonized over the proposed marriage. It would seem to secure the succession of Beatrice, because she would have a powerful neighboring monarch as an ally who could counteract the aspirations of John of Portugal and his siblings instead of supporting them, yet on the other hand the Castilian King, having to reside in Castile, would have to leave the affairs of Portugal in the hands of Queen Leonor as regent. The marriage contract was signed on 2 April 1383 in Salvaterra de Magos. The contract stipulated that at the death of Ferdinand I without sons, the crown would pass to Beatrice, and her husband would be titled King of Portugal. However, both sides agreed that the Kingdoms of Castile and Portugal would not unite, and to guarantee this Queen Leonor Teles would remain as regent and in charge of the government of Portugal until Beatrice had a son who reached 14 years of age, who would then assume the government and title of King of Portugal in place of his parents. If Beatrice died without surviving children, the crown would pass to other hypothetical sisters, and if there were none it would pass to John I of Castile, and through him to his son Prince Henry, again disinheriting the children of Inês de Castro. The succession of Castile also was stipulated: in case the succession of John and of his two sons failed, the crown would pass to his sister Eleanor, and if she also died without offspring, the Castilian throne would pass to King Ferdinand I Portugal and his descendants. During the preparation of the marriage contract, the King of Castile objected to the dowry assigned to Beatrice and also disagreed that his sons by her had to be raised in Portugal, that Queen Leonor Teles could hold the regency in Portugal, and that the border fortresses had to be in Portuguese hands, but in view that it offered him the Kingdom of Portugal, these objections were viewed as secondary and he accepted the agreement.

Pedro de Luna, a pontifical legate for the Kingdoms of Castile, Aragon, Portugal and Navarre, solemnized the betrothal at Elvas on 14 May 1383, and the official wedding ceremony took place on 17 May in Badajoz Cathedral. To ensure compliance with the Treaty, on 21 May a group of Castilian knights and prelates swore to denaturalize from the Kingdom and fight against their monarch if the Castilian King broke the agreements made in the marriage contract, and in the same way a group of Portuguese knights and prelates (among them the Master of Aviz) made the same oath if the Portuguese King broke the treaty with Castile. Later, Beatrice approved in her own name what was agreed at Salvaterra de Magos. Once the wedding took place, she went to live in Castile with her husband. The marriage contract was taken to the Cortes de Santarém of August and September to swear to accept Beatrice and John I of Castile as heirs of Portugal, although these acts were not conserved. For her part, Queen Leonor Teles gave birth on 27 September to a daughter who lived only a few days, so Beatrice remained the only legitimate child of King Ferdinand I.

=== Crisis of 1383–1385 ===
King Ferdinand I of Portugal died on 22 October 1383. Leonor Teles, his widow, in accordance with the Treaty of Salvaterra and the testament of the deceased monarch, assumed the regency and government of the Kingdom in the name of her daughter. The regent maintained her clique of Castilian Petrists, which strengthened an opposition faction that demanded that the Council of the regent only included councillors of Portuguese origin.

News of the death of the Portuguese King came to John I of Castile and Beatrice in Torrijos, and they immediately closed the Cortes in Segovia. The Master of Aviz wrote to the Castilian monarch urging him to take the Portuguese crown that belonged to him through his wife, and that the Master himself be made regent on their behalf. To avoid dynastic conflicts with John of Portugal (first-born son of Inês de Castro) the Castilian King imprisoned him in the Alcázar of Toledo, and there adopted the title and the arms of King of Portugal, which was recognized by Antipope Clement VII. Later, he convened the Royal Council in Montalbán and sent Alfonso López de Tejeda to Portugal with instructions to the regent to proclaim him and his wife King and Queen of Portugal.

The proclamation was made, but in Lisbon and other places like Elvas and Santarém, a popular rejection was expressed in favour of John of Portugal. John I of Castile decided to lead troops into Portugal to take possession of the Kingdom, against the advice of some members of his Council since it represented a clear contravention of the agreements made in the Treaty of Salvaterra. He had the support of Beatrice's chancellor, Afonso Correia, Bishop of Guarda, who promised him the surrender of the land. John I thus entered Portugal with Beatrice to ensure the obedience of Portugal and the rights of his wife.

For John I of Castile, his marriage allowed him to maintain a protectorate over the Portuguese kingdom and the ability to prevent the English from becoming established in the Iberian Peninsula. In addition, the union of Castile and Portugal would benefit the Portuguese nobility, who would have a greater expectation of receiving land, titles and positions. Faced with this, the peasants, who had improved their standing as a result of the depopulation of the countryside, feared a reinforcement of the privileges of the nobility while the merchants, artisans, public officials and large sections of the lesser nobility feared their political, social and economic annulment in the face of an increase in the power of the Portuguese high nobility and the threat of a Castilian domination that favoured agriculture over trade. Combining opposition to the regent and her Petrist clique, the expectation of a commercial monopoly, and fears of Castilian dominion and loss of Portuguese independence, uprisings began in Lisbon in late November and early December. The Master of Aviz killed the Count of Ourém, a favourite of the regent, and after that, there was the uprising of the peasants against the government instigated by Alvaro Pais, in which Martinho Anes, Bishop of Lisbon, was murdered. The uprising spread to the provinces, claiming the lives of the Abbess of the Benedictine cloister in Évora, the Prior of the collegiate church of Guimarães and Lançarote Pessanha, Admiral of Portugal, in Beja, among others. The uprising had the support of the bourgeoisie but not of the nobility, who maintained their support of the regent.

Queen Leonor Teles fled from Lisbon with the court and took refuge in Alenquer. In Lisbon, Alvaro Pais proposed the marriage of the Master of Aviz with the Queen regent so they could jointly assume the regency, but she refused, and with the news of the imminent arrival of the Castilian King, the Master of Aviz was chosen Defender and Regent of the Kingdom on 16 December 1383, invoking the rights of John of Portugal, first-born son of Inês de Castro. The Master of Aviz constituted his own Council in which João das Regras appeared as Chancellor, and requested the aid of England; he also tried to besiege Alenquer, but Leonor fled to Santarém, so he immediately returned to prepare the defence of Lisbon. In Santarém, Leonor Teles proceeded to recruit an army and sought the help of her son-in-law the King of Castile to defeat the insurgents who didn't accept her regency or recognize her daughter Beatrice as Queen.

John I of Castile acted to control the situation in Portugal, leaving a Council of Regency in Castile consisting of Alfonso of Aragon, Marquis of Villena, Pedro Tenorio (Archbishop of Toledo) and Pedro González de Mendoza (First Mayordomo of the King). In early January 1384 John I, together with Beatrice, invaded Portugal via the road to Santarém, following Queen Leonor Teles' call, and a few days later, on 13 January, he obtained from his mother-in-law her resignation of the regency and government. Thus the Castilian King assumed control of the government, and he organized a chancellery, a court, and an army composed essentially of Castilians. After this, many knights and castle governors came to pay homage to him and his wife Beatrice, such as those of Santarém, Ourém, Leiria, Montemor-o-Velho, Feira, Penella, Óbidos, Torres Vedras, Torres Novas, Alenquer, Sintra, Arronches, Alegrete, Amieira, Campo Maior, Olivenza, Portel, Moura, Mértola, Braga, Lanhoso, Valença do Minho, Melgaço, Vila Nova de Cerveira, Viana do Castelo, Ponte de Lima, Guimarães, Caminha, Bragança, Vinhais, Chaves, Monforte, Miranda do Douro, Montalegre, Mirandela, Castelo Rodrigo, Almeida, Penamacor, Guarda, Covilhã and Celorico da Beira, among others. However, Queen Leonor began to conspire against her son-in-law, and for this she was sent to the Monastery of Tordesillas. This provided the Master of Aviz with further justification for the revolt because the terms of the Treaty of Salvaterra had been violated, and in addition, it split the nobility that had mostly supported Leonor, with several of them, such as the Chancellor of the regent, Lourenço Eanes Fogaça, allying with the Master of Aviz.

Although he counted on the support of the majority of the Portuguese aristocracy, King John I couldn't repeat the Castilian triumphs of the Fernandine Wars and failed before Coimbra and Lisbon. On 3 September 1384, he left garrisons in the cities of his supporters, returned to Castile and asked for help from the King of France. Beatrice also left Portugal for what turned out to be the last time. Meanwhile, the Master of Aviz attempted to seize loyal cities from his adversaries, and although he took Almada and Alenquer, he failed in Sintra, Torres-Novas and Torres Vedras. He then went to Coimbra, where he had summoned Cortes for March 1385. There, Beatrice was declared illegitimate because the marriage of her parents was considered invalid, and on 6 April they proclaimed the Master of Aviz as King John I of Portugal. After the Cortes, the new sovereign undertook a campaign to control the north of the Kingdom and thus obtained Viana do Castelo, Braga and Guimarães. John I of Castile again entered Portugal, this time via Ciudad Rodrigo and Celorico, but his army's defeats at Trancoso and Aljubarrota in May and August 1385 represented the end of any chance to impose himself as King of Portugal.

At Aljubarrota the Castilian disaster was absolute: the King fled to Santarém and from there he descended through the Tagus river until he met his fleet around Lisbon, and in September, the Castilian fleet returned to Castile. John I of Portugal then gained control of the cities that were still opposed to him. He took over the region north of the Duero where Portuguese knights still maintained fidelity to Beatrice and John I of Castile: Villareal de Pavões, Chaves and Bragança capitulated in late March 1386, and Almeida in early June.

=== Legitimism and truces with Portugal ===
The Castilian disaster at Aljubarrota produced an exodus towards Castile of Portuguese clerics who had remained faithful to Antipope Clement VII (their maintenance being undertaken by Queen Beatrice, who also requested benefits for them from the Antipopes at Avignon) and nobles, who initially didn't receive substantial compensation since they were expected to return to Portugal.

Aljubarrota also renewed the aspirations of the descendants of King Peter of Castile: his daughter Constance and her husband John of Gaunt, Duke of Lancaster. On 9 May 1386, Portugal and England signed the Treaty of Windsor, and John of Gaunt, his wife and their daughter, Catherine of Lancaster, arrived in Galicia in July. John I of Castile immediately called the Cortes in Segovia to assure the defence of the Kingdom, and in addition, rehabilitated John of Portugal, the first-born son of Inês de Castro, entrusting him the regency of Portugal in his and his wife's names, with the goal of undermining the position of his half-brother King John I of Portugal. Given the scant results of the Anglo-Portuguese campaign and the loss of support in Galicia, John of Gaunt and John I of Castile signed the Treaty of Bayonne on 8 July 1388, under the terms of which John of Gaunt and his wife renounced to all their rights over the Castilian throne in favour of the marriage of their daughter Catherine with the first-born son and heir of John I of Castile, the future Henry III. The interruption of the Hundred Years' War with the Truce of Leulinghem motivated the Truce of Monção on 23 November 1389 between Castile and Portugal, under which cities both sides had occupied were restored, but the dynastic claims of Beatrice remained pending.

The recovery of Portugal was still on the mind of the Castilian monarch; in 1390, celebrating Cortes in Guadalajara, he proposed to his Council his abdication to dedicate himself completely to Portugal. His death on 9 October 1390, generated a power struggle to constitute the regency, so the Portugal issue was postponed with the renewal of the truce in 1393. Throughout these struggles, they preserved the dispositions King John I had made in his testament, written at Celorico da Beira in 1385, that provided for the economic maintenance of the household of the now-Dowager Queen Beatrice, on which depended the Portuguese exiles who had followed her to Castile. The testament also made reference to the doctrinal part of the inheritance rights, but there is disagreement over their intent. Olivera Serrano indicates that John I recognized his wife Beatrice as the legitimate queen of Portugal, and as she died without legitimate descendants, the rights would be passed to Henry III, according to the terms of the Treaty of Salvaterra de Magos in 1383, while the mention of Papal arbitration was merely to dictate and ratify that the rights of succession over Portugal would indeed belong to Henry III after Beatrice's death. Oliveira Martins indicates that the Pope had to decide who should be the ruler of Portugal after the death of the Castilian King, whether it should pass to Beatrice or to her stepson Henry III. The dynastic rights of Beatrice would for decades constitute an insurmountable obstacle to the normalization of relations between the Kingdoms of Castile and Portugal, a situation that could only be completely resolved in 1431 after the signing of the Treaty of Medina del Campo. Beatrice's presence in the Kingdom of Castile was beneficial to the aspirations of the House of Trastámara over Portugal because the Dowager Queen represented the dynastic legitimacy against the illegitimacy of the House of Aviz.

During the reign of Henry III there was a greater Portuguese exodus to Castile, the common factor of which was the rejection of the House of Aviz, and the Castilian King granted the exiles some compensation for their losses in Portugal. These exiles would reject good relations between the Kingdom of Castile and the House of Aviz, and also tended to maintain networks of kinship consistent with their allegiances, and thus the exiled adherents of Beatrice settled in cities where the Dowager Queen had influence, like Toro or Valladolid.

John I of Portugal reinitiated warfare between 1396 and 1399 to force favourable clauses in a peace treaty, but his results weren't what he expected. In the negotiations that culminated in the truce of 1402, the Castilians persisted in maintaining the rights of Beatrice and proposed a marriage between her and Afonso, the first-born son of John I of Portugal, but this union was rejected by the Portuguese king. Henry III also raised his own inheritance rights in Portugal on the basis that Kings Ferdinand I of Portugal and John I of Castile had been maternal first cousins.

The death of Henry III in 1406 marked a new direction in the relations with Portugal. While the life of Beatrice in Castile didn't change since the testament of the King indicated that the provisions made by his father for her should be respected, the government of the Castilian kingdom was now in the hands of a co-regency in the name of the infant King John II between his mother, Catherine of Lancaster and his paternal uncle, Infante Ferdinand; however, their political differences forced the division of the Kingdom of Castile between them for his administration. As to peace with Portugal, Catherine favoured her brother-in-law, the Portuguese King, while Ferdinand favoured the position of legitimacy, which maintained the cordiality between Beatrice and Ferdinand, her youngest stepson. The disagreement between the regents prevented peace with Portugal and the truces were renewed only in 1407.

The death of King Martin of Aragon in 1410 and Ferdinand's aspirations for the Aragonese throne made him more conciliatory toward Portugal. Ferdinand still maintained the superiority and legitimacy of his family's dynastic rights, but in the negotiations that developed into the provisional treaty of 1411, the dynastic question and the Western Schism remained separate from the settlement in other points of friction: the Castilians promised not to wage war with Portugal for Beatrice's rights or the Western Schism, and agreed to suppress any claims by the exiles faithful to Beatrice over their confiscated property or indemnifications prior to the year 1402.

The problem concerning the Western Schism was solved at the Council of Constance (1414–1418). The new elected Pope, Martin V, recognized the King of Portugal, and thus in the bull Sane Charissumus of April 1418 he asked the Christian sovereigns to help the Portuguese monarch in his fight against the Saracens. The death of King Ferdinand I of Aragon in 1416 and the deposition of Antipope Benedict XIII in 1417, eliminated the only remaining support that Beatrice retained.

The power struggle in Castile between Álvaro de Luna and the Infantes of Aragon, brothers of King Alfonso V of Aragon, made Portugal a factor in support of the Infantes of Aragon, so Álvaro de Luna tried to eliminate this with a lasting peace. The Treaty of Medina del Campo of 30 October 1431 established that the rights of Beatrice died with her, and King John II renounced any rights that may have fallen to him through the kinship between Ferdinand I of Portugal and John I of Castile. In addition, the Castilian king accepted the House of Aviz as part of his family by virtue of the kinship between Catherine of Lancaster, mother of the Castilian King, and her half-sister, Philippa of Lancaster, wife of the Portuguese King. The Portuguese exiles in Castile were denied any rights or compensation in Portugal.

=== Life in Castile ===
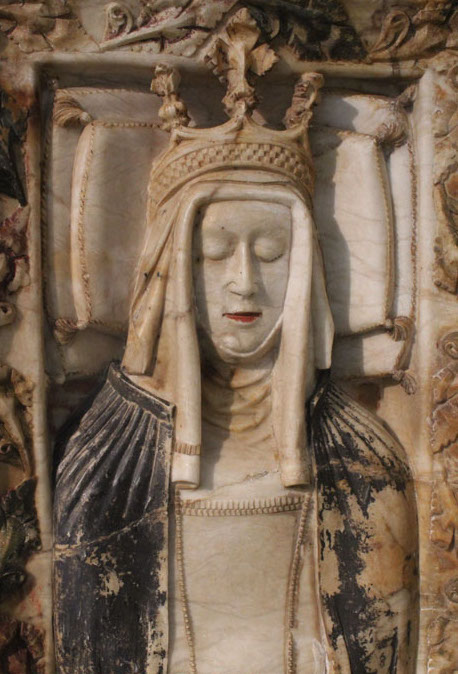
Effigy of Queen Beatrice, Monastery of Sancti Spiritus in Toro, Zamora, Spain.

In 1376, when Beatrice was sworn heiress to Portugal in the Cortes de Leiria, she received a patrimony for the maintenance of her own household, though it was controlled by her mother. The Queen's favorite, Juan Fernández de Andeiro, was Beatrice's First Mayordomo. Following her marriage, rather than including territorial incomes, the dowry of the princess consisted of money that King John I of Castile had to accept with the prospect of obtaining the Kingdom of Portugal. As a minor, her husband retained her custody, but since 1385, when she attained her legal majority, Beatrice was able to sign and seal her own documents.

As Queen consort of Castile, she maintained her household, in which Juan Rodríguez Portocarrero served as First Mayordomo, and her Chancellor was the Bishop of Guarda, Afonso Correia, who would be succeeded by the lawyer Vicente Arias de Balboa. Beatrice's patrimony in Castile varied over the years since the Castilian monarchs had to reward other relatives according to the political interests of the moment. Some provisions concerning the patrimony of Beatrice in the testament of John I of Castile, dated 1385, couldn't be fulfilled in 1392 when the regency of Henry III revised the testament. Although as the wife of the Castilian King, she had jurisdiction over Tordesillas, San Esteban de Gormaz, Cuéllar, Peñafiel, Medina del Campo and Olmedo, when she became a widow she only retained Béjar and Valladolid. In 1396, Henry III exchanged Béjar for Ciudad Real and the merindad of Valladolid.

Her marriage with John I of Castile was childless, although a son called Miguel is mentioned in several genealogies of the 17th and 18th centuries and even in some modern history books, probably representing confusion with Miguel da Paz, the grandson of the Catholic Monarchs. From 1390 Beatrice, now a 17-year-old widow, remained in the shadows, distanced from the intrigues of the court. Nevertheless, she still had a visible presence in the Castilian court, maintaining a relationship in a wider social circle than the group of Portuguese exiles. During the regency of John II of Castile, she settled in Ciudad Real, and as appears from her letters, she seems to have retired to Toro after the treaty of 1411. In 1409 she received the marriage proposal of a Duke of Austria, a member of the House of Habsburg. She rejected it since it would have led to the loss of her Castilian patrimony, which would have harmed her Portuguese exile partisans, and she needed to retain the ability to make the type of political marriage that would have been necessary for a hypothetical return to Portugal. Beatrice maintained a close relationship with her stepson Ferdinand (later King of Aragon), supporting his family, and especially Infante Henry, intervening to support his election as Grand Master of the Order of Santiago in 1410.

In 1419 Beatrice sent Juan González de Sevilla, professor of the University of Salamanca and later Bishop of Cádiz, to appeal to Pope Martin V asking for the type of permissions usually granted to a person preparing to die. No documentary evidence of her death has survived, but her properties were dispersed, granted to the constable Álvaro de Luna from 1420, and in June 1420 Toro appears to have reverted to the Crown. Juan González de Sevilla, who was in charge of representing Beatrice as her ambassador before the pope, stopped referring to himself in this manner from April 1420. In April 1423 a new truce with Portugal was agreed upon that discussed the inheritance and succession of Beatrice, which suggests she had already died.

=== Status as monarch ===
Coat of arms of Beatrice of Portugal.

There has been some actual debate as to whether Beatrice should be counted as a monarch or not. In recent decades, a historiographical current of Spanish and Portuguese authors defend that she was titular Queen of Portugal between 22 October and the middle of December 1383. Some historians counted Beatrice as the queen of Portugal during 1383–1385. However, the majority of the Portuguese historians have argued that during the 1383–1385 period Portugal had no monarch, and in Portugal Beatrice is not counted as a queen regnant.

The Portuguese rebellion was not the only challenge to her accession, she also faced competing claims of her own husband. Many Portuguese nobles of the pro-Castilian faction also recognized her husband, King John I of Castile, as their jure uxoris monarch, rendering him vassalage and obedience, as, for example, did Lopo Gomes de Lira in Minho. As can be read in his 21 July 1385 testament written at Celorico da Beira, John identified himself as the king of Portugal and possible effective owner of the kingdom, saying that if he predeceased his wife, the Pope should decide whether Beatrice or his son (her stepson) Henry should be the sovereign of Portugal.

== Ancestry ==
Ancestors of Beatrice of Portugal

8. Afonso IV of Portugal
4. Peter I of Portugal
9. Beatrice of Castile
2. Ferdinand I of Portugal
10. Juan Manuel, Prince of Villena
5. Constanza Manuel
11. Constance of Aragon
1. Beatrice of Portugal
12. Afonso Telles de Meneses, o Raposo
6. Martim Afonso Telo de Meneses
13. Berengária Lourenço de Valadares
3. Leonor Teles
14. João Mendes de Vasconcelos
7. Aldonça Eanes de Vasconcelos
15. Aldara Afonso Alcoforado

== Sources ==
- Williamson, David (1988). Debrett's Kings and Queens of Europe. Exeter: Webb & Bower. ISBN 0-86350-194-X.
- Campos, Isabel Maria Garcia de Pina N. Baleiras S. (2008). Leonor Teles, uma mulher de poder? (PDF) (in Portuguese). Vol. 1. Universidade de Lisboa.
- Gebhardt, Víctor (1864). Historia general de España y de sus Indias desde los tiempos más remotos hasta nuestros días (in Spanish). Vol. 4. Librería Española. OCLC 221636772.
- Livermore, H.V. (1947). A History of Portugal. Cambridge University Press. p. 171. OCLC 1368719.
- O'Callaghan, Joseph F. (1983). A history of medieval Spain. Cornell University Press. ISBN 9780801492648.
- Olivera Serrano, César (2005). Beatriz de Portugal. La pugna dinástica Avís-Trastámara (PDF). CSIC. ISBN 9788400083434.
- Schäffer, Heinrich (1840). Histoire de Portugal: depuis sa séparation de la Castille jusqu'à nos jours (in French). Vol. 1. Parent-Desbarres. OCLC 459014425.
- Stephens, H. Morse (1891). Portugal: A History. Forgotten Books. ISBN 9781440083563.
- Suárez Fernández, Luis (1976). Historia de España antigua y media (in Spanish). Vol. 1. Ediciones Rialp. ISBN 9788432118821.
- Suárez Fernández, Luis (1981). Los Trastámara y la Unidad Española (in Spanish). Ediciones Rialp. ISBN 9788432121005.

Beatrice of Portugal House of Burgundy Cadet branch of the House of Capet Born: 7–13 February 1373 Died: c. 1420
Spanish royalty
Vacant Title last held by Eleanor of Aragon	Queen consort of Castile and León; 17 May 1383 – 9 October 1390	Vacant Title next held by Catherine of Lancaster
Regnal titles
Preceded by Ferdinand I	— DISPUTED — Queen of Portugal; 1383 – 1385	Vacant Title next held by John I
