= João das Regras =

Portuguese jurist

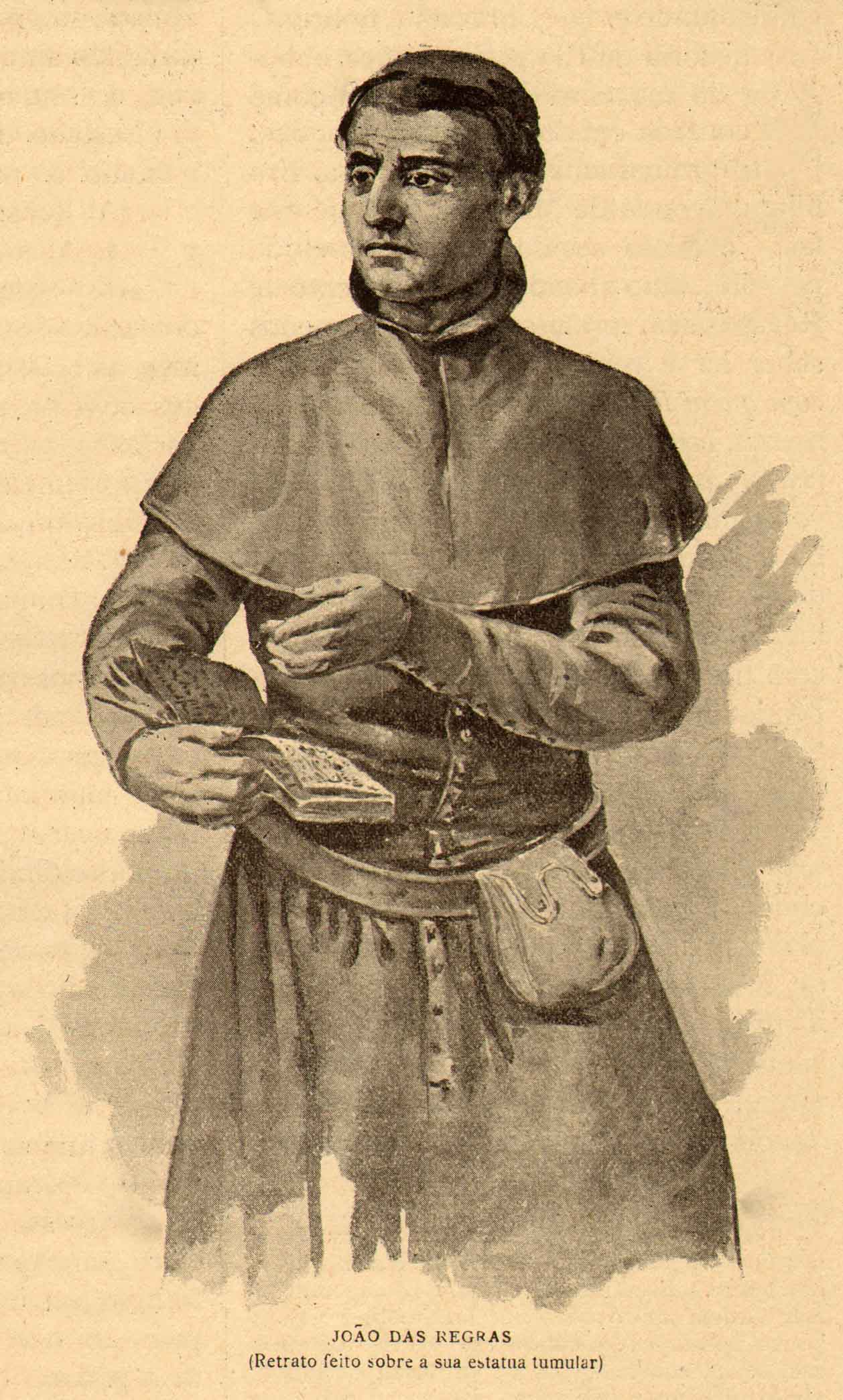
- Portrait based on his tomb statue
- Born: Unknown; Lisbon, Kingdom of Portugal
- Died: 3 May 1404; Lisbon, Kingdom of Portugal
- Occupation: Jurist
- Known for: Supporter of the claims of John I, to the throne of Portugal during the 1383–1385 Crisis

João das Regras (Unknown - 3 May 1404), in English, literally John of the Rules, was a Portuguese jurist of the second half of the 14th century. In the context of the 1383—1385 Crisis, in Portugal, he stood out for his masterly representation for the cause of the Master of Avis in the Coimbra Courts of 1385, the corollary of which was his acclaim as King of Portugal.

== Life ==
Born in Lisbon at an unknown date, he was the son of João Afonso das Regras and Sentil Esteves, João das Regras became a stepson of Álvaro Pais, the chief chancellor of the Portuguese Kingdom, after his mother's second marriage.

According to the Portuguese chronicler Fernão Lopes, João das Regras studied in the University of Bologna. Later, João das Regras became a professor in the University of Lisbon and in October 1400, became the Protector of the University (a title that nowadays can be compared to that of a Rector).

Although he was reputed to have defended the creation of a compilation of laws and, controversially, the possibility of having wrote its first few chapters, the works only started after his death in 1404. Works which would produce the first codification of Portuguese law and one of the first in the modern era: the Ordenações Afonsinas.

João das Regras became notable for supporting the claims of the grand-master of the Order of Aviz, João I to the throne of Portugal during the 1383–1385 Crisis, a period of civil war and anomie in the Portuguese history that began with the death of king Fernando I of Portugal — who left no male heirs — and ended with the accession to the throne of João I. During that period, several pretenders to the Portuguese throne arose and Regras became notable for refuting the arguments of every one of them without mentioning the name of João I at the Cortes of Coimbra.

His famous intervention in the Crisis began by influence of his stepfather, also a supporter of the grand-master, who had a major intervention in the Lisbon uprising, that would take João I to the throne. João das Regras was appointed by João I as his personal counsellor and supported the Master by pointing reasons that excluded the remaining pretenders to the throne, Beatrice of Portugal, Juan I of Castile, Denis, Lord of Cifuentes and John, Lord of Alba de Tormes, omitting the name of John I.

== The arguments against the four pretenders to the throne ==
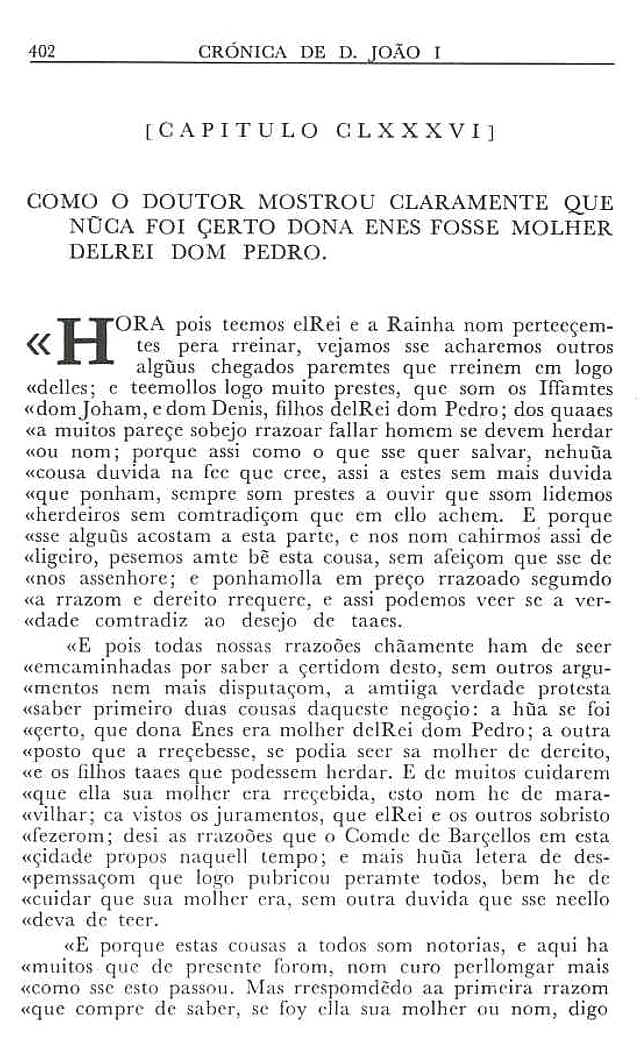
An excerpt of the Chronicle of John I by Fernão Lopes, showing some of the arguments used by João das Regras (in Portuguese).

- João das Regras claimed that Beatrice of Portugal, daughter of Ferdinand I had no right to claim the throne because her father's marriage with Leonor Telles was void, due to the previous marriage of Leonor with João Lourenço da Cunha and also due to the uncertain behaviour of Leonor Telles, which created doubts about the identity of Beatrice's father. Along with that, he also claimed that she married John I of Castile, who was her relative, without the dispensation of the Pope.
- To the king of Castile, Juan I, João das Regras refuted the right of being King of Portugal because of his recognition of the Antipope Clement VII, a fact that made Juan I a heretic. Along with that, Juan I was descendant of Ferdinand I by the female lineage, a fact that, according to the Portuguese and Spanish customary law gave him no right to claim the throne.
- The princes Denis, Lord of Cifuentes and John, Lord of Alba de Tormes, the two male sons of Peter I of Portugal and Inês de Castro, and therefore half-brothers of Ferdinand I had no right to claim the throne for being illegitimate (despite the King himself had sworn and presented witnesses of that marriage). Along with that, they proved to be enemies of Portugal after making an alliance with Henry II of Castile and his son Juan I.

This strategy showed the vacancy of the throne, because no heir had a legitimate right to it. Therefore, the courts had the right to choose the King themselves. As the grand-master João I was desired by every member of the courts and by the Portuguese people, that rebelled in order to assure his ascension to the throne, João I became King of Portugal, the first of the House of Aviz.

João das Regras was praised by João I and received several benefits and properties, among other things, the king gave him knighthood and granted him the lordship of Castelo Rodrigo, Tarouca, Beldigem, Cascais and Oeiras. João das Regras died in Lisbon on 3 May 1404 and is buried in the church of São Domingos de Benfica.

== Notes ==
1. The original Portuguese and Spanish names of the kings are used because in English they both translate as "John I," which is confusing.
2. At this time (fourteenth century), Castile is not synonymous with "Spain". That country appeared only in the end of the fifteenth century, with the marriage of Isabella I of Castile and Ferdinand of Aragon (the rulers, together, of present-day Castile, Leon, Asturias, Aragon, Catalonia, Valencia, Balearic Islands), the Canary Islands and Sicily and other territories in the Italic peninsula —"the Catholic Monarchs."
