= Treaty of Medina Del Campo =

Treaty of Medina Del Campo can refer to:

- Treaty of Medina del Campo (1431), between the Crown of Castile and the Kingdom of Portugal
- Treaty of Medina del Campo (1489), between England and the Spain
