= The Drama of Inês de Castro =

Painting by Columbano Bordalo Pinheiro

- Drama de Inês de Castro (Portuguese)
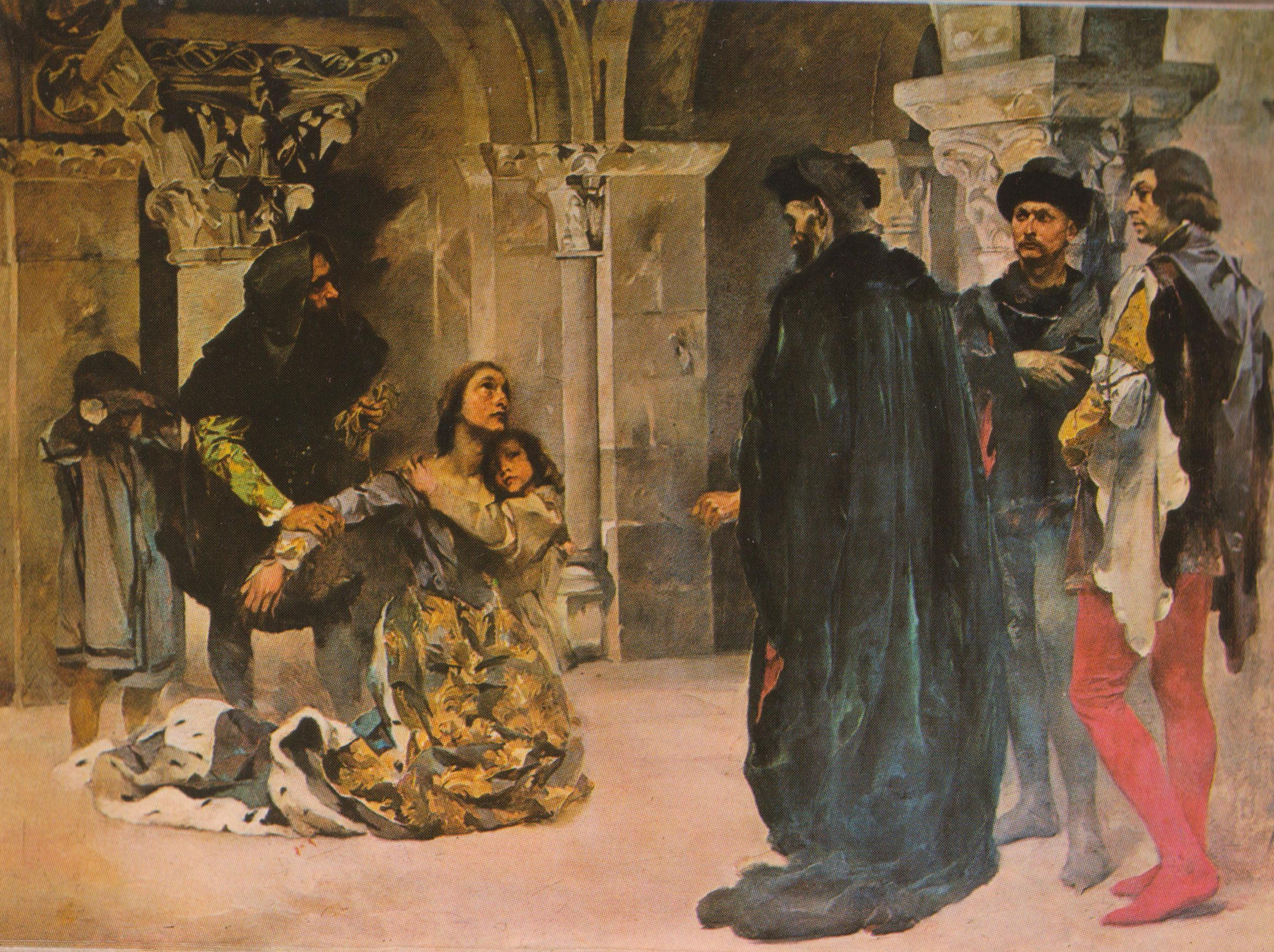
- Artist: Columbano Bordalo Pinheiro
- Year: 1901-1904
- Medium: oil on canvas
- Dimensions: 196 cm × 246 cm (77 in × 97 in)
- Location: Museu Militar de Lisboa, Lisbon

The Drama of Inês de Castro (Portuguese: Drama de Inês de Castro) is an oil on canvas painting by the Portuguese artist Columbano Bordalo Pinheiro, from 1901–1904. It is held at Military Museum of Lisbon (Museu Militar de Lisboa).

== History and description ==
This was one of the paintings that Columbano was commissioned to create for the Sala Camões (Room Camões) of the recently inaugurated Military Museum of Lisbon.

The painting depicts the previous moments before the tragic execution of Inês de Castro, which took place on January 7, 1355. King Afonso IV of Portugal, yielding to the pressure of his royal councilors, ordered the assassination of Inês, the mistress of his son, Infante Dom Peter, the future King Peter I of Portugal. The historical event occurred at the Santa Clara palace in Coimbra, where she resided.

According to the Military Museum website, Columbano drew inspiration for the scene from the way its described in Luís de Camões' epic The Lusiads, specifically Canto III, Stanza 125, which portrays Inês's desperate plea to the king.

The composition, somewhat theatrical, is divided into two groups. On the left, a kneeling Inês pleads for her life while clutching her daughter; an executioner-like figure in a hood holds her arm, and her young son covers his eyes. On the right, King Afonso IV, dressed in black, stands with his back to the viewer, accompanied by the noblemen who instigated him to sentence Inês to death. They later also would suffer a barbaric death at the hands of the future king. The architectural setting hints at a crypt-like space rather than an open hall.

A preparatory study is preserved at the Grão Vasco National Museum, in Viseu (Inv. No. 2455) [3, 4].

== Reception ==
Art historian Maria Aires Silveira notes that Columbano's realist technique relies on tonal contrasts, patches, and a focus on light that dematerializes figures, aligning him with European masters like Velázquez and Manet. Margarida Elias also points to the possible inspiration for the episode from Paul Delaroche's The Execution of Lady Jane Grey.
