= Valencia de Don Juan =

Coordinates: 42°18′N 5°31′W

Valencia de Don Juan / Coyanza
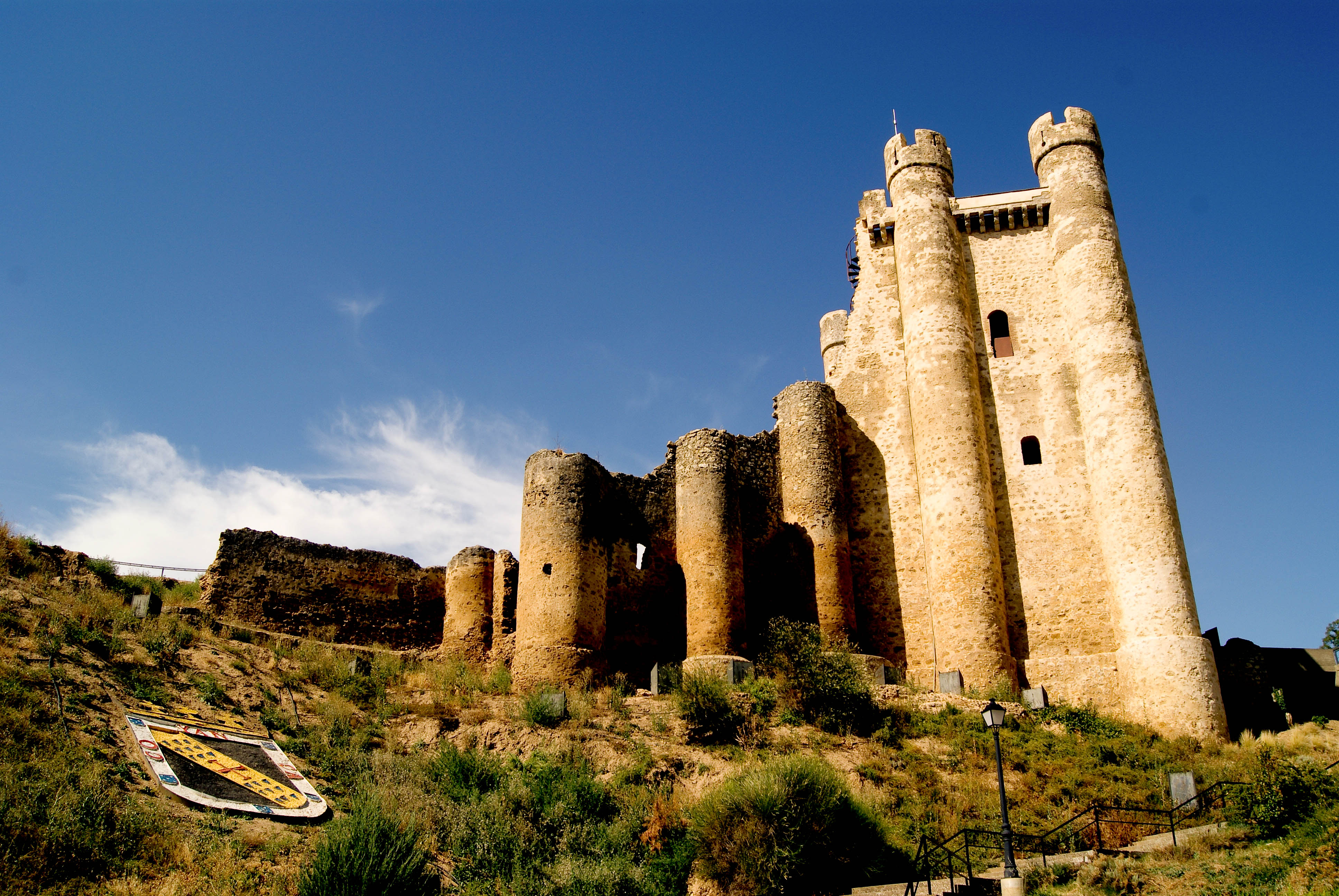
- Castillo de Valencia de Don Juan

- Flag Coat of arms
- Interactive map of Valencia de Don Juan / Coyanza
- Country: Spain
- Autonomous community: Castile and León
- Province: León
- Municipality: Valencia de Don Juan

Area
  - Total: 58 km^{2} (22 sq mi)

Population (2025-01-01)
  - Total: 5,103
  - Density: 88/km^{2} (230/sq mi)
- Time zone: UTC+1 (CET)
  - Summer (DST): UTC+2 (CEST)

Valencia de Don Juan (Spanish pronunciation: [baˈlenθja ðe ðoŋ ˈxwan]; Coyanza in Leonese language) is a municipality located in the province of León, Castile and León, Spain. In 2023, the municipality had a population of 5,185.

Originally, Valencia de Don Juan was named Comeniaca and Castrum Covianca in Roman times. In the High Middle Ages, it appeared as Cives Quoianka and Coyanza or Coyança (as it appears in the current seal, in addition to being evoked in the gentile "coyantino"). This lasted until the thirteenth century in which it was changed by Valencia de Campos, before renamed to the current name after its first lord and duke, Infante John of Portugal.

== Language ==
Coyanza City Council promotes Leonese language courses.

== See also ==
- Kingdom of León
- Leonese language
- Llión
- Province of Llión
