= Quinta das Lágrimas =

Coordinates: 40°11′53″N 8°26′0″W

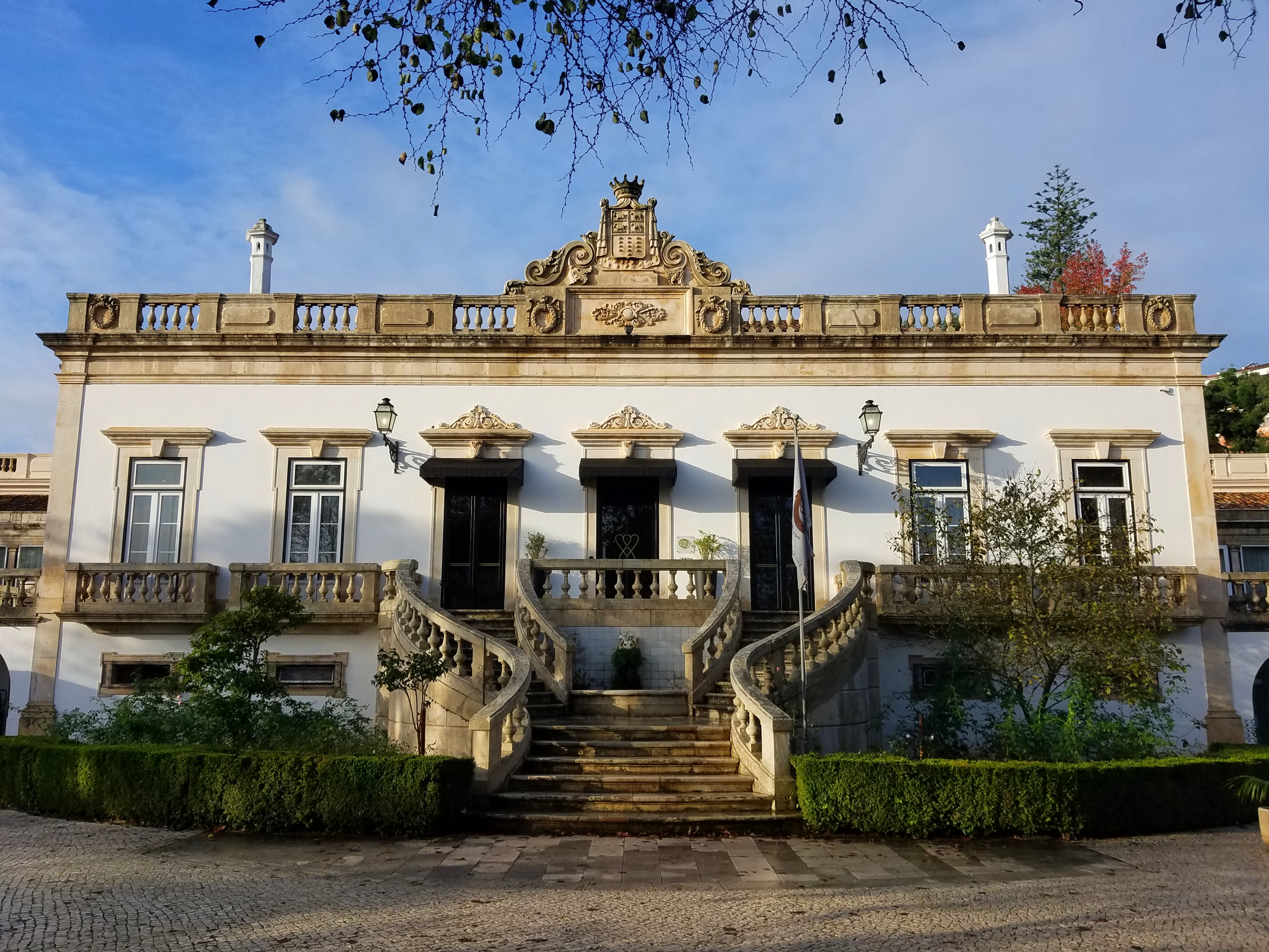
Quinta das Lágrimas in Coimbra, Portugal.

Quinta das Lágrimas (Portuguese pronunciation: [ˈkĩtɐ ðɐʒ ˈlaɣɾimɐʃ]) is a quinta in Coimbra. It was classified in 1977 as an "Imóvel de Interesse Publico" (En: Building of Public Interest) by the IPPAR. It includes 12 ha (29.6 acres) of gardens and a palace that has been converted into a luxury hotel.

== History ==
The origin of the estate is uncertain. It is known that it was a hunting ground for the Portuguese royal family and that it later belonged to the University of Coimbra and afterwards to a religious order. It was acquired by the Osório Cabral de Castro family in 1730, by whose order the palace was built. In 1879 a large part of the palace was lost during a fire. It was rebuilt in the late nineteenth century by Miguel Osório Cabral de Castro, in a style different from that of the original.

== Building ==
The palace building has a central body and two lateral ones. The lateral bodies feature a balcony with a railing of square columns on their façade. To the right there is a chapel.

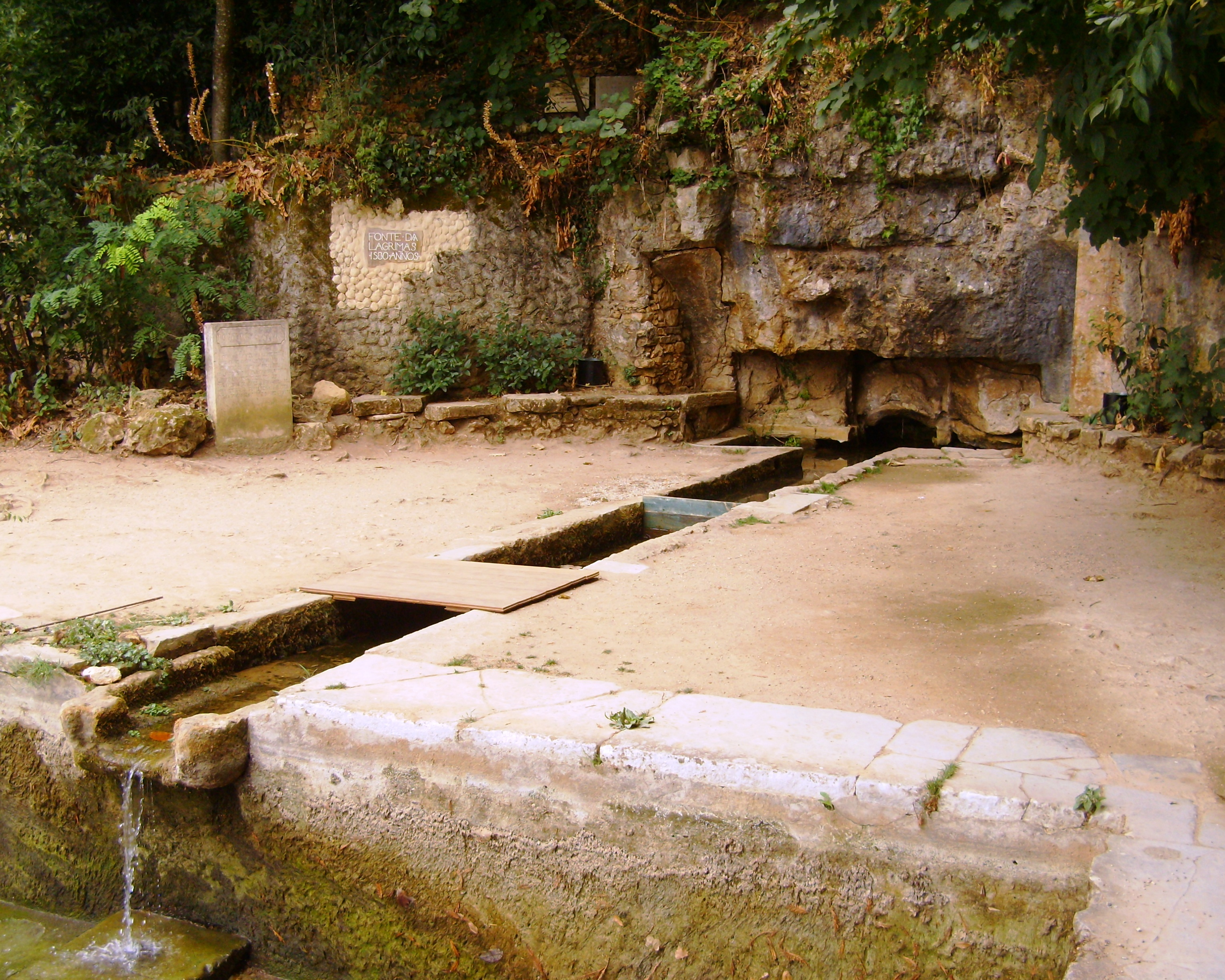
The "Fonte das Lágrimas"

The "Fonte das Lágrimas" (En: Fountain of Tears), which according to legend originated from the tears shed by Inês de Castro when she was killed, is located close to the spring identified by António de Vasconcelos. Its entry features a broken arch, probably from the fourteenth century.

== Legend and haunting ==
The name Quinta das Lágrimas ("quinta" meaning "estate", "lágrimas" meaning "tears"; "The Estate of Tears") comes from the legend of Prince Pedro and his wife's lady-in-waiting Inês de Castro who had a forbidden royal love affair for many years, starting in 1340. The tryst ended in 1355 when Pedro's father, King Afonso IV, who suspected Inês and her family to have designs for his throne, orders his henchmen to kill her. But unbeknownst to the king, when Pedro's wife died, he secretly married Inês. After his father's death, Pedro became King of Portugal in 1357, and ordered the men responsible for his beloved's murder to be killed. He also wanted the courtiers to acknowledge her as their new queen and had Inês' body buried in a royal tomb. But the story takes a chilling turn when King Pedro ordered that Inês' body was exhumed and put on the throne beside him for the entire court to swear allegiance to their queen. They had to bend their knee before her decaying corpse and kiss her hand.

The fountain, "Fonte das Lágrimas", born of her tears, stands on the property where Inês was killed and supposedly her blood still stains its stone bottom. For centuries, the estate is reportedly haunted by the ghost of Inês, who is heard crying on the grounds, eternally searching for her lost love, Pedro.
