= John, Duke of Valencia de Campos =

14th-century Portuguese noble

John of Portugal
- Duke of Valencia de Campos; Lord of Alba de Tormes
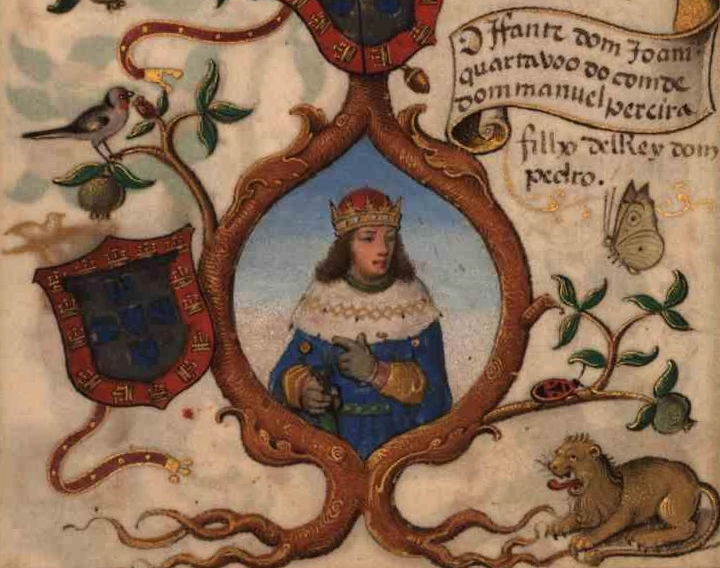
- Born: 1352; Coimbra, Kingdom of Portugal
- Died: c. 1396; Salamanca, Crown of Castile
- Buried: Convent of San Esteban, Salamanca
- Family: Portuguese House of Burgundy
- Spouses: Maria Tellez de Meneses (m. 1376, d. 1379); Constance, Lady of Alba de Tormes (m. c. 1380)
- Issue more...: Ferdinand, Lord of Eça
- Father: Peter I of Portugal
- Mother: Inês de Castro

John of Portugal (Portuguese: João [ʒuˈɐ̃w]), occasionally surnamed Castro (1352 – c. 1396), was the eldest surviving son of King Peter I of Portugal by his mistress Inês de Castro. He was a potential but unsuccessful contender for the Portuguese throne during the 1383–85 crisis of succession.

== Background ==
John was the son of the Portuguese King Peter I and his lover Inês de Castro, a Galician noblewoman who had arrived in Portugal as a lady-in-waiting to Infanta Constance of Castile, recently married to Pedro I (royal heir at the time).

The status of John as Infante of Portugal is a debatable subject. Some historians consider him a natural son of Peter I, and so assert that the title 'Infante of Portugal' could not be attributed to him. Others refer to the circumstances of the death of Inês de Castro, ordered by Peter's father, King Afonso IV of Portugal: after inheriting the throne, the Prince admitted he had married Inês secretly, therefore she was a lawful Queen of Portugal and he was legitimized as Infante of Portugal.

== Life ==
The Duke Infante lived at the Court of Ferdinand I. He was a knight and skilled at riding, hunting and shooting. He was close with his half-brother, Master of Avis, although they were very different in character. Infante John was ambitious and bold.

He fell in love with María Teles de Meneses (c. 1338, Coimbra – November 1379, Coimbra), a redheaded beauty about fourteen years older than he, who was lady-in-waiting to the Infanta Beatrice and sister of Queen Leonor Teles. María was the widow (circa 1360) of Álvaro Dias de Sousa (c. 1330 – 1365), 2nd Lord of Mafra and Ericeira, by whom she had conceived Lopo Dias de Sousa (c. 1360 – 1435, Pombal), who inherited his father's titles and later became Master of the Order of Christ. Infante John, having gone to her house to fetch her, found an altar and a priest waiting; María had made the preparations for their wedding. Thus the marriage was performed secretly in 1376, and when it became public knowledge, it provoked the wrath of Leonor Teles. Upon the death of Ferdinand I with no male heir, the people might demand the crowning of the beloved Infante John as king, which would raise his wife to the throne, with grave consequences to herself (Leonora), hated as she was by the Portuguese people.

Leonor persuaded her brother João Afonso Telo 6th Count of Barcelos and Alcaide-Mór (noble magistrate) of Lisbon, to insinuate the idea in the mind of the Infante that his marriage to her daughter, the heiress presumptive Beatrice (who was promised to John I of Castile), would find favour with the people and clear his way to the throne. With the false imputation that his present wife María had been unfaithful to him, transmitted by Leonora through John Alfonso, Infante John became so enraged that he stabbed María in Coimbra. In one single coup, Leonor Teles got disentangled of her sister and brought such opprobrium upon the name of her brother-in-law, that his hopes of succeeding to the throne were much diminished.

Having committed this crime of passion, John fled to Beira. Ferdinand I intended, or pretended he would, to punish the culprit, but he was soon forgiven and returned to his place in the royal court. When he spoke, however, of marrying his half-niece, the Infanta Beatrice, the Queen herself disillusioned him. Infante John, realizing he had been ensnared by the machinations of Leonora, retired to the Douro and then to Castile, avoiding the persecution that was encouraged by the cunning Leonor.

Henry II called Infante John to his court and gave him in marriage his illegitimate daughter Constance of Castile, in about 1378. When the Castilian army invaded Portugal, John joined its ranks and laid siege to Elvas, which held firm. Upon the death of Ferdinand I, John I of Castile had him arrested, considering him a threat as the most direct successor to the Portuguese throne. Meanwhile, his connections with Castile eventually cost him the throne, thanks to the argumentation of Master João das Regras at the Cortes of Coimbra in 1385. During the Battle of Aljubarrota he was already out of the country like his brother Denis, both of them having left Portugal for Castile, although during the 1383–85 crisis he was one of the claimants to the throne, along with Beatrice of Portugal (his half-niece), John, Master of Aviz (his half-brother) and Denís (his brother).

Shortly after the battle of Aljubarrota, John was released. He and his new wife were created lord and lady of Alba de Tormes in 1385 by the King of Castile (his brother-in-law). In the summer of 1386, he was commissioned to defend Andalusia from Portuguese attacks. Later in the year, when John of Gaunt (uncle of the English king Richard II) invaded northern Castile to try to claim the throne for himself, Infante John made a series of incursions into Portuguese territory, but failed to garner significant support for his own pretensions to the Portuguese crown. For his loyalty to Castile, in 1387 John was created duke of Valencia de Campos (renamed Valencia de Don Juan in his honor), a rank which adjoined him to the upper echelons of Castilian nobility. Castile's truces with England and Portugal from 1388 onwards seem to have eclipsed Duke John from any significant political role, and he kept a relatively low profile until his death.

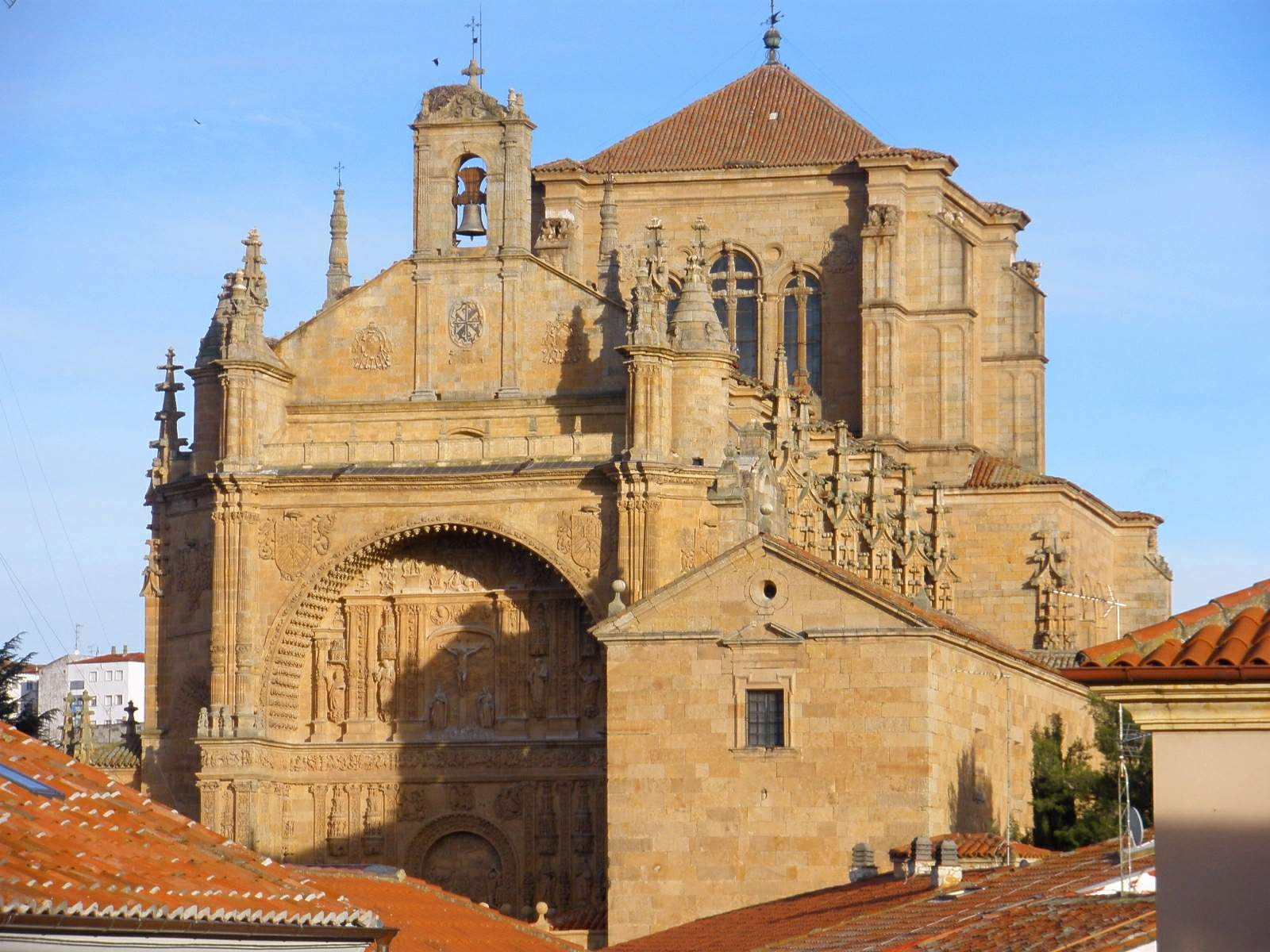
Convent of San Esteban in Salamanca

John's precise date of death is unclear. He could have died in or after 1393 and before 1397, when his younger brother Denis, Lord of Cifuentes, received support from legitimists in Portugal (implying that his older brother, who would have had a better claim, was already deceased). The chronicler Fernão Lopes said that he was dead by 1397. On 19 September 1396, Henry III of Castile confirmed on John's daughters their right to succeed in their father's county of Valencia de Don Juan, suggesting that John may have been dead by then. The Portuguese genealogist Anselmo Braamcamp Freire cites a letter from John I of Portugal, dated 20 September 1400, in which he refers to his deceased namesake half-brother, but he also suggests that the date might be wrong due to statements that Duke John was active in 1402 in confirming privileges given by Henry III of Castile to Palencia Cathedral. John's estates were partitioned between his legitimate daughters on 2 November 1404 at Medina del Campo.

None of the children of Inés de Castro were buried in their native land. John's brother, Infante Denis, was buried at the Monastery of Santa María de Guadalupe, his sister Beatriz in the Cathedral of Burgos, and John at the Convent of San Esteban in Salamanca.

== Titles and styles ==
Styles of John of Portugal
- Reference style: His royal Highness
- Spoken style: Your royal Highness

- Duke of Valencia de Campos (22 December 1387– 1396?)
- Lord of Alba de Tormes (15 December 1385– 1396?)

== Issue ==
His first marriage, in 1376, was to Maria Teles de Meneses, the widow of Alvaro Dias de Sousa. She was the daughter of Martim Afonso Telo de Meneses and his wife Aldonça Anes de Vasconcelos. From this marriage he had one son:

- Ferdinand, Lord of Eça. (Note: Olivera Serrano considers him an illegitimate child.) He lived in Galicia. The name of his wife is not known but he had at least one legitimate daughter, Isabel, and a son named John who may have been legitimate or illegitimate, and another daughter named Catalina Deza. Alive in 1458, dead by 1479.

His second marriage, in about 1380, was to Constanza Enríquez de Castilla, illegitimate daughter of King Henry II of Castile. From this marriage he had 2 daughters: (Note: Older genealogical records allege that John had a third daughter, named Joanna, who married Lopo Vaz da Cunha, Lord of Buendia. The marriage has been established false, and Joanna is absent from modern sources.)

- Maria, Countess of Valencia de Campos (born 1381), the second wife of Martín Vásquez de Acuña, 1st Count of Valencia de Campos, with issue
- Beatriz, 2nd Lady of Alba de Tormes (died in November 1446), who married Pero Niño, 1st Count of Buelna, and had female issue

On 2 November 1404, both sisters divided their father's inheritance. Maria inherited the county of Valencia de Don Juan and Beatriz the county of Alba de Tormes.

Out of wedlock he had:

- Luís da Guerra, elected bishop of Guarda in 1427
- Afonso, jure uxoris Lord of Cascais and of Lourinhã (c. 1370 – 1441, Zamora), married firstly to Branca da Cunha das Regras, 2nd Lady of Cascais and 2nd Lady of Lourinhã, and had female issue, and married secondly to Maria de Vasconcelos, 3rd Lady of Soalhães, and had issue, now extinct in the male line
- Pedro da Guerra (c. 1366 or 1372 – 1406), married c. 1395 to Teresa Anes Andeiro, daughter of Juan Fernández Andeiro (born c. 1380), and had issue, now extinct in the male line, and had issue by Maria Anes (born c. 1380), now extinct in the male line
- Fernando, 1st Lord of Bragança (c.1374 or 1385 – after 30 December 1410), married in 1406 to Leonor Vasques Coutinho (born c. 1380), without issue
