= Jerónimo Bermúdez =

Playwright of the Spanish Golden Age

Jerónimo Bermúdez de Castro (1530–1599) was a playwright of the Spanish Golden Age.

== Biography ==
He belonged to the order of St. Dominic, and was professor of theology at Salamanca.

== Works ==
He published at Madrid in 1577, under the name of Antonio de Silva, two tragedies upon the subject of Inez de Castro, Nise Lastimosa and Nise Laureada. He also published a poem originally written in Latin, and translated by himself into Spanish, entitled La Hesperoida, of which the duke of Alva was the hero.
