= Denis, Lord of Cifuentes =

Portuguese infante

Denis of Portugal
- Lord of Villar-Dompardo; Lord of Cifuentes, Escalona y Alvar de Tormes
- Born: 1353; Coimbra, Kingdom of Portugal
- Died: c. 1403; Crown of Castile
- Buried: Santa María de Guadalupe Monastery
- Family: Portuguese House of Burgundy
- Spouse: Joan of Castile, Lady of Cifuentes
- Issue see...
- Father: Peter I
- Mother: Inês de Castro

Denis of Portugal (Portuguese: 'Dinis' or 'Diniz' [diˈniʃ]), occasionally surnamed Castro (1353 – c. 1403), was an infante of Portugal. He was the son of Portuguese King Peter I and a Galician noblewoman named Inês de Castro who had arrived in Portugal as a maid of princess Constance of Castile, recently married to Pedro I (Heir Prince at the time). Peter and Inês were not married at the time of Denis birth but Peter had him and his siblings legitimized once he became king.

== History ==
Considering Denis an Infante of Portugal is a debatable subject. Some historians consider him a natural son of Peter I, so the title Infante of Portugal could never be attributed to him. Other opinions refer that after the death of Inês de Castro, ordered by Pedro's father King Afonso IV of Portugal, the Prince after inheriting the throne admitted that he had married Inês secretly, and because of that she was a lawful Queen of Portugal.

After the death of his mother Denis left Portugal to Castile with his brother but during the 1383–85 Crisis he was one of the claimants to the throne along with Beatrice of Portugal (his niece), John, Master of Aviz (his half-brother) and John (his brother). Although he managed to be acclaimed King in the city of Santarém his connections with Castile eventually lost him the throne and at the time of the Battle of Aljubarrota he was already out of the country like his brother John.

== Family ==
He married in 1372 Joan of Castile, 2nd? Lady of Cifuentes, born c. 1360, illegitimate daughter of Henry II of Castile by Juana, 1st? Lady of Cifuentes, born c. 1340, by whom he had:

- Pedro de Portugal, called «de Colmenarejo», married to María de Toledo, daughter of Fernando Álvarez de Toledo el Viejo, 1st Lord of Higares and Teresa Vázquez de Ayala, 3rd Lady of Pinto;
- Beatriz de Portugal (died 1470), unmarried and without issue.

Illegitimate children:

- Fernando de Portugal, Comendador of Oreja, married to María de Torres, daughter of Fernán Ruiz de Torres and Inés de Solier;
- Juan de Portugal;
- Beatriz de Portugal, nun;
- Inés de Portugal, nun.

He died in about 1403.
