= Inês de Castro =

Galician noblewoman and courtier (1325–1355)

Inês Pires de Castro
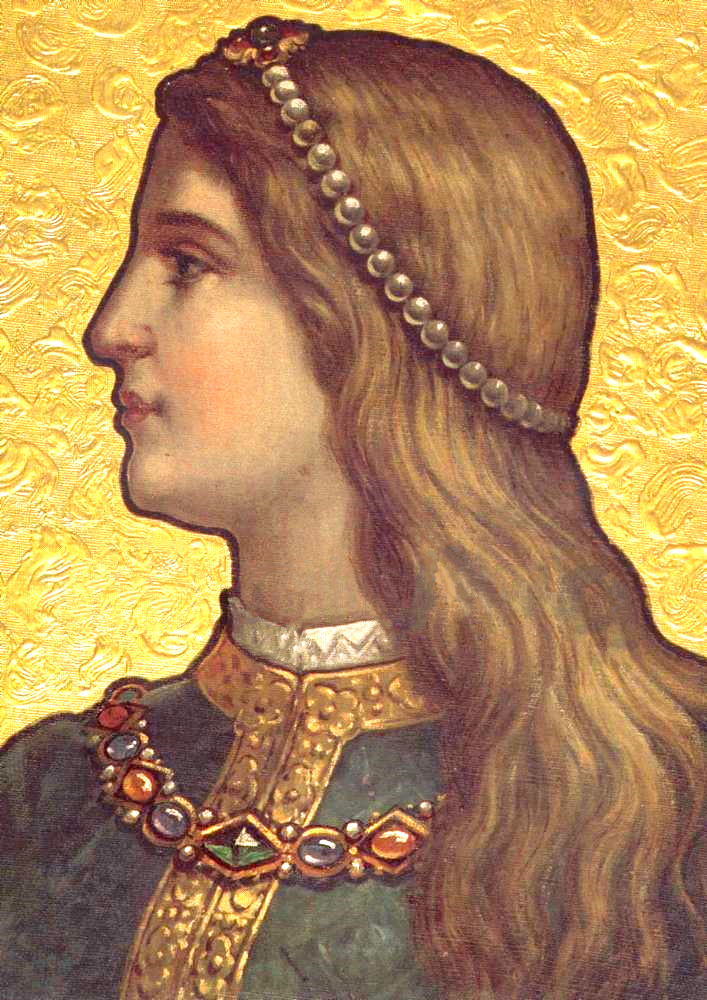
- 19th-century depiction of Inês de Castro, on the ceiling of the Kings' Room, Quinta da Regaleira, Sintra, Portugal.
- Born: c.1320-1325 Galicia, Castile
- Died: 7 January 1355 (aged 29–30); Coimbra, Portugal
- Buried: Alcobaça Monastery
- Family: Castro
- Spouse: Pedro I of Portugal (m. 1353) (Note: In order to have his issue with Inês legitimized, Pedro claimed to have married her in 1353.)
- Issue among others: John, Duke of Valencia de Campos; Denis, Lord of Cifuentes; Beatrice, Countess of Alburquerque
- Father: Pedro Fernández de Castro
- Mother: Aldonça Lourenço de Valadares

Inês de Castro (Portuguese pronunciation: [iˈneʒ ðɨ ˈkaʃtɾu]; in Castilian: Inés; c.1320/1325 – 7 January 1355) was a Galician noblewoman and courtier, best known as the lover and posthumously recognized wife of King Pedro I of Portugal. The dramatic circumstances of her relationship with Pedro (at the time Prince of Portugal), which was forbidden by his father Afonso IV of Portugal, her murder at the orders of Afonso, Pedro's bloody revenge on her killers, and the legend of the coronation of her exhumed corpse by Pedro, have made Inês de Castro a frequent subject of art, music, drama and poetry through the ages.

== Biography ==
=== Early life and background ===
Inês was the natural daughter of Pedro Fernández de Castro, Lord of Lemos and Sarria, and his noble Portuguese mistress Aldonça Lourenço de Valadares. Her family descended from both the Galician and Portuguese nobilities. She was also well connected to the Castilian royal family, by illegitimate descent. Her stepmother was Infanta Beatriz of Portugal, the youngest daughter of Afonso of Portugal, Lord of Portalegre and Violante Manuel. Her grandmother was Violante Sánchez of Castile, Lady of Uzero, the illegitimate daughter of Sancho IV of Castile. Her great-great-grandfather was Rodrigo Alfonso de León, Lord of Aliger, the illegitimate son of Alfonso IX of León. She also descended from Infanta Sancha Henriques of Portugal, the daughter of Henry, Count of Portugal.

Little is known about Inês's youth with certainty. She was likely raised in the household of Teresa Martínez, wife of Afonso Sanches, Lord of Albuquerque, a natural son of Diniz of Portugal. According to traditional accounts, Inês arrived in Portugal in 1340 as a lady-in-waiting of Constance of Castile, newly wed to Infante Pedro, heir to the Portuguese throne. However, no surviving documentary evidence supports this narrative. Given her family's ties to Portugal, Inês may have already been established at the Portuguese court as a noblewoman before Constance’s arrival. Although the exact circumstances of her introduction are debated, scholars agree that Inês was a member of Constance's household.

=== Relationship with Pedro ===
Traditional narratives maintain that Infante Pedro fell in love with Inês and took her as his mistress while she was lady-in-waiting to his wife. Disapproving of his son's adultery, King Afonso IV is said to have banished Inês to Albuquerque in 1344. (Note: Miguélez (2025) notes that claims of an affair appear only in later chronicles; no extant contemporary records support the claim that Pedro and Inês had a relationship during his marriage to Constance.)

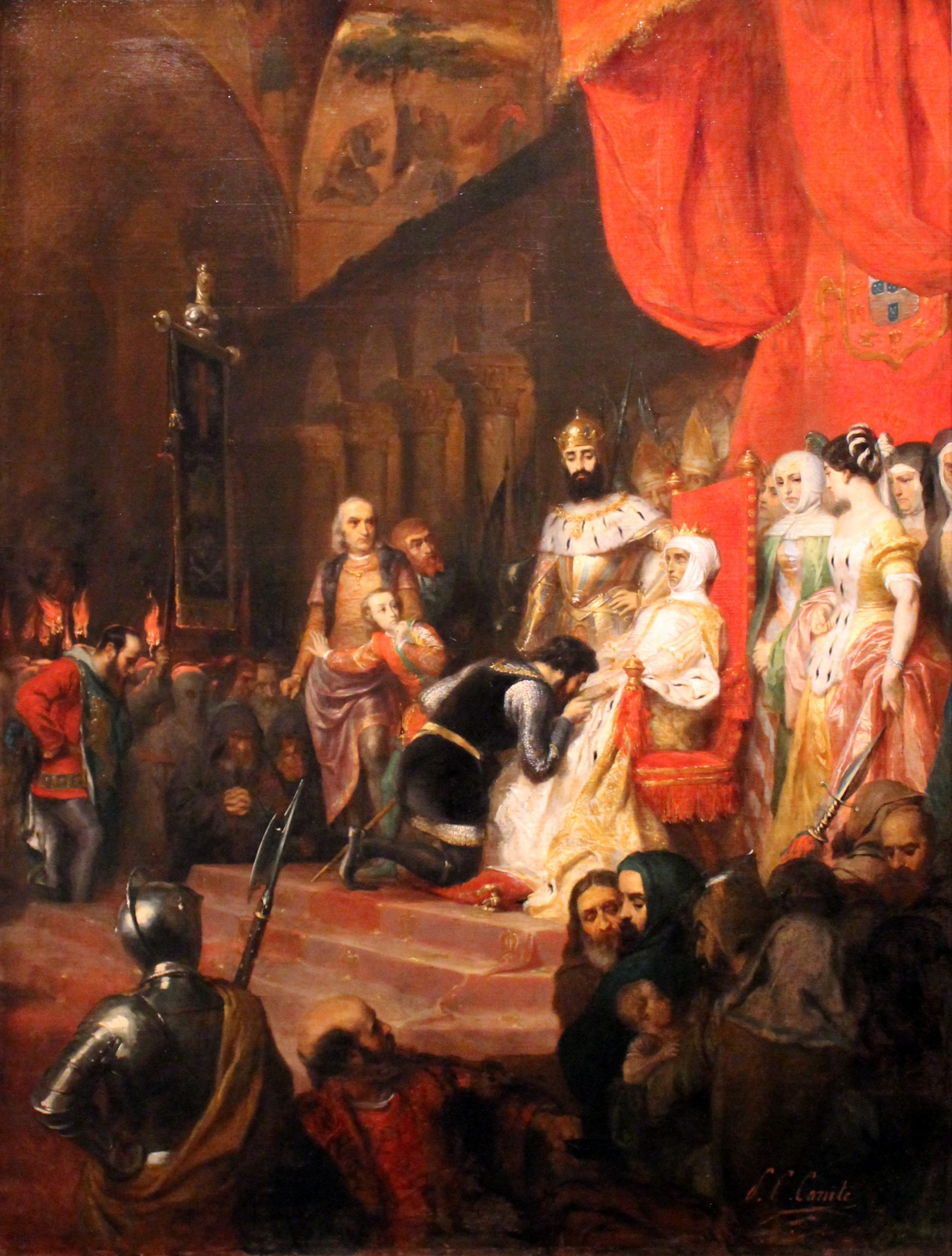
The Coronation of Inês de Castro in 1361, by Pierre-Charles Comte, 1895

Following Constance's death in 1349, Inês returned to Portugal and lived openly with Pedro. In 1350, Inês gave birth to the couple's first child, Afonso. He was followed by John (b. 1352), Denis (b. 1353) and Beatrice (b. 1354). King Afonso attempted to arrange a second marriage for his son, but Pedro refused.

Pedro also developed close relationships with Inês's brothers, Fernando Ruiz de Castro and Álvaro Pires de Castro. The brothers became increasingly influential in public affairs, causing intrigue among rival factions at the Portuguese court and threatening Portugal's neutrality in the Castilian Civil War. King Afonso IV grew concerned about the power the Castros wielded over the Infante and ordered Inês's assassination.

=== Death ===
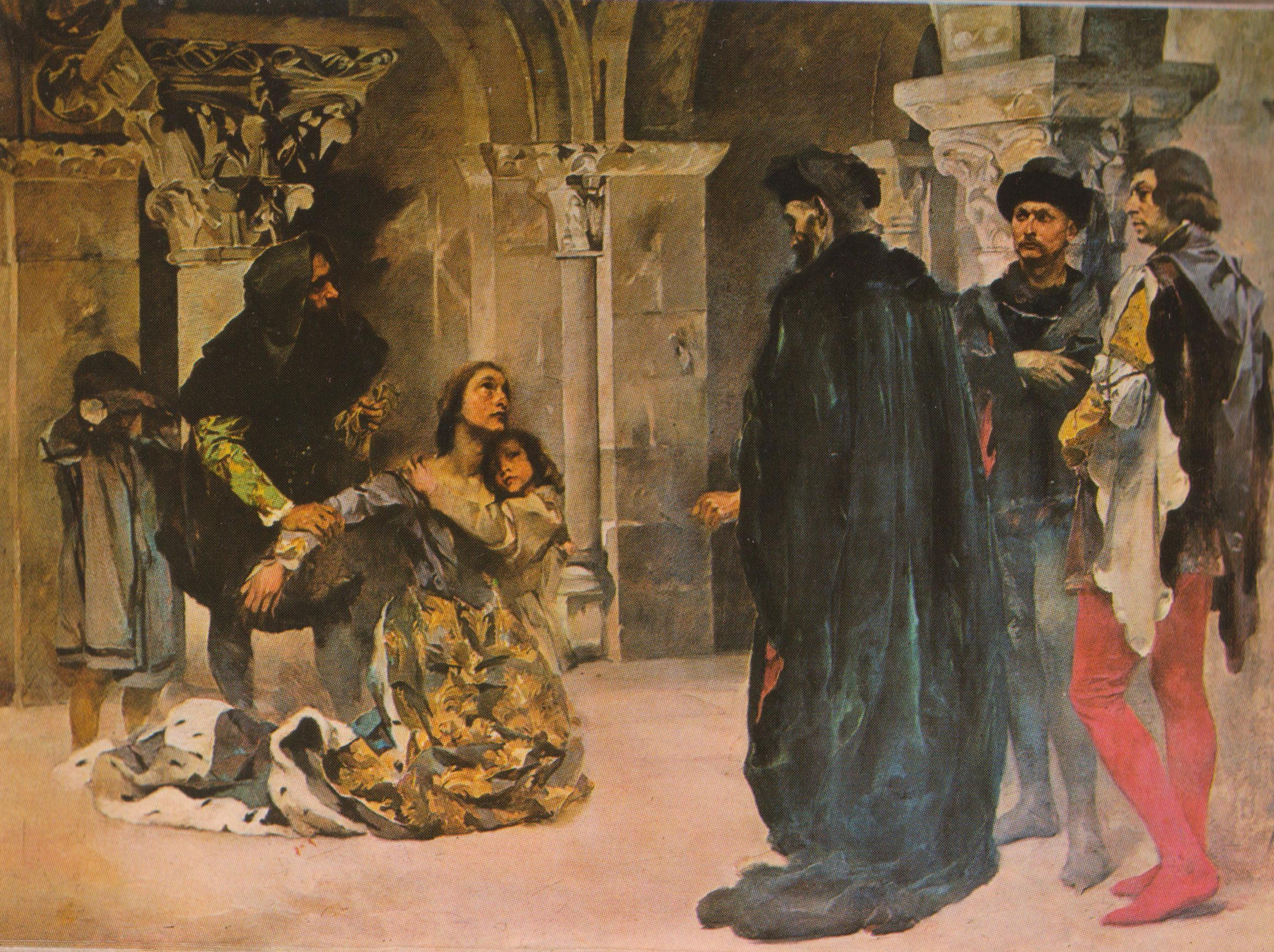
The Drama of Inês de Castro (1901-1904) by Columbano Bordalo Pinheiro

Chronicles assert that Afonso's knights, Pêro Coelho, Álvaro Gonçalves, and Diogo Lopes Pacheco, travelled to the Monastery of Santa Clara-a-Velha in Coimbra, where Inês was residing, and decapitated her in front of her small children on 7 January 1355. Enraged, Pedro revolted against Afonso IV but was overcome within a year. In a truce signed 15 August 1356, Pedro swore to obey his father and pardon the men that murdered Inês. Pedro succeeded to the throne just months later in May 1357.

Following his accession, Pedro rejected the oath he had made previously, and sought out Inês' killers, who had gone into exile in Castile. According to the chronicles of Fernão Lopes, Pedro managed to capture two of them, Coelho and Gonçalves, and ordered them to be barbarically executed by ripping their hearts out.

In 1360, Pedro declared that he had secretly married Inês in 1353. During the 1383–85 Crisis of royal succession in Portugal, João das Regras produced evidence that allegedly established that Pope Innocent VI had refused Pedro's request to recognize his marriage to Inês and legitimize his children by her, the elder of whom, John, Duke of Valencia de Campos would have a strong potential claim to the throne of Portugal. By negating these children's claimed legitimacy, João das Regras strengthened the claim of another illegitimate child of Pedro I of Portugal: John, Master of Aviz, who ultimately took the throne and ruled as John I of Portugal.

Pedro commissioned a tomb for Inês, and later one for himself, in the Alcobaça Monastery. Around 1361, he had Inês's body exhumed from the Monastery of Santa Clara-a-Velha to be transferred to Alcobaça. Popular legend alleges that Pedro forced the entire court to participate in a post-mortem coronation: "The king [Pedro] caused the body of his beloved Inês to be disinterred, and placed on a throne, adorned with the diadem and royal robes, and required all the nobility of the kingdom to approach and kiss the hem of her garment, rendering her when dead that homage which she had not received in her life..." The story is most likely a myth, having first appeared in 1577 in Jerónimo Bermúdez' play Nise Laureada. Inês's tomb sits opposite Pedro's, so that, according to legend, at the Last Judgment the lovers can look at each other as they rise from their graves. However, initially their tombs were disposed side by side, only being put opposite each other centuries after their deaths. Both tombs are exquisitely sculpted with scenes from their lives and a promise by Pedro that they would be together até ao fim do mundo (until the end of the world).

== Issue ==
Inês de Castro and Pedro I had the following children, who were legitimized by Pedro I on 19 March 1361:

- Afonso, died shortly after birth.
- John, Duke of Valencia de Campos, claimant to the throne during the 1383–85 Crisis.
- Denis, Lord of Cifuentes, claimant to the throne during the 1383–1385 Crisis.
- Beatrice, married Sancho of Castile, Count of Alburquerque and was thereby the great-grandmother of Ferdinand II of Aragon, and thereby an ancestor of all Trastamara and Habsburg Spanish monarchs. (Note: Ferdinand II of Aragon, son of John II of Aragon, son of Eleanor of Alburquerque, daughter of Beatrice, Countess of Alburquerque.)

== Inês de Castro in literature and music ==
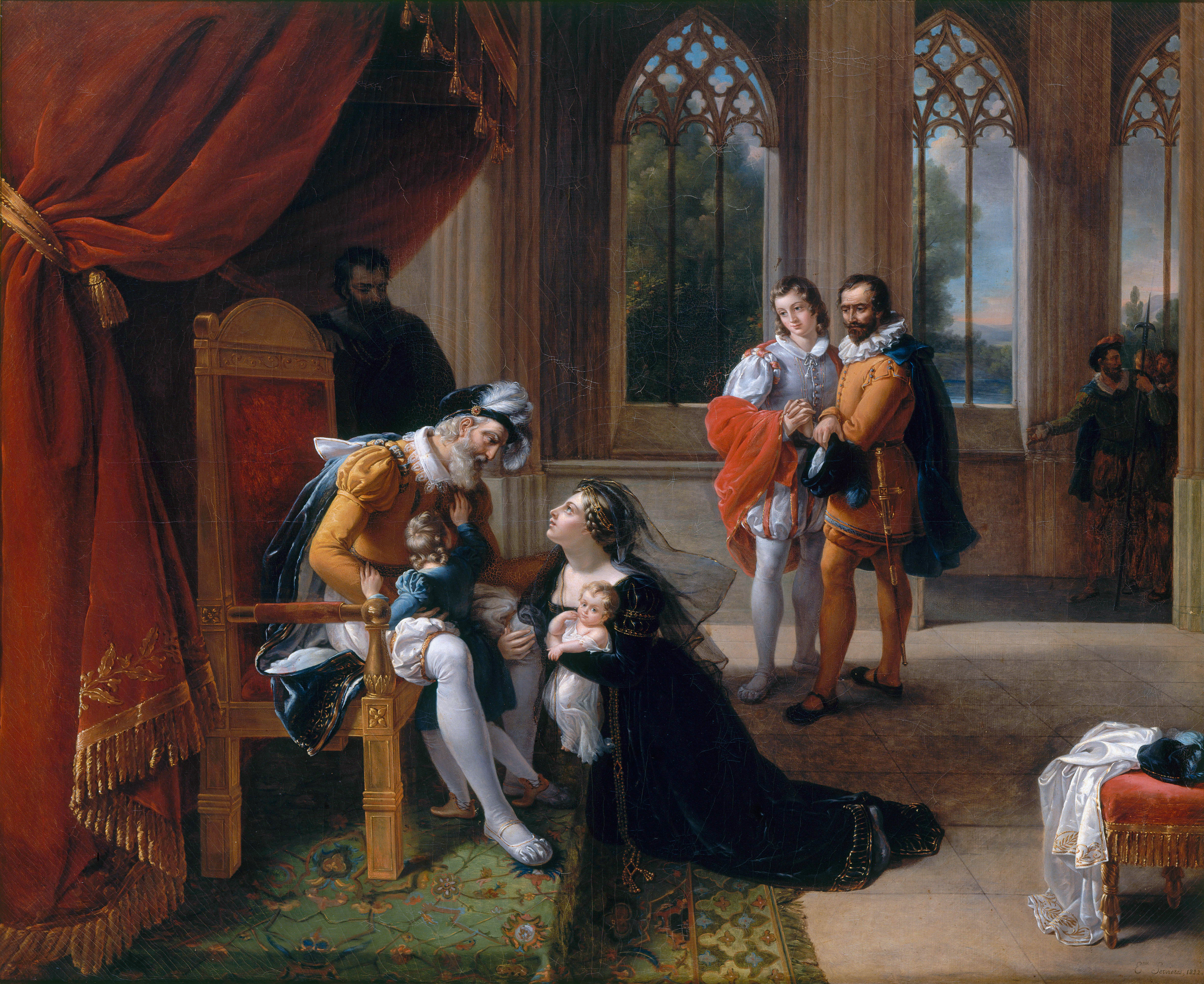
Inês de Castro with Her Children at the Feet of Afonso IV, King of Portugal, Seeking Clemency for Her Husband, Don Pedro. Painting by Eugénie Servières, 1822

Inês de Castro's story is immortalized in several plays and poems in Portuguese, such as The Lusíadas by Luís de Camões (canto iii, stanzas 118-135), the tragedy Castro (1598) by 16th century playwright António Ferreira, and Spanish, such as Nise lastimosa and Nise laureada (1577) by Jerónimo Bermúdez, Reinar despues de morir by Luís Vélez de Guevara, as well as by the comtesse de Genlis (Inès de Castro, 1826), and in a play by French playwright Henry de Montherlant called La Reine morte (The Dead Queen). Inês de Castro is a novel by Maria Pilar Queralt del Hierro [es] in Spanish and Portuguese.

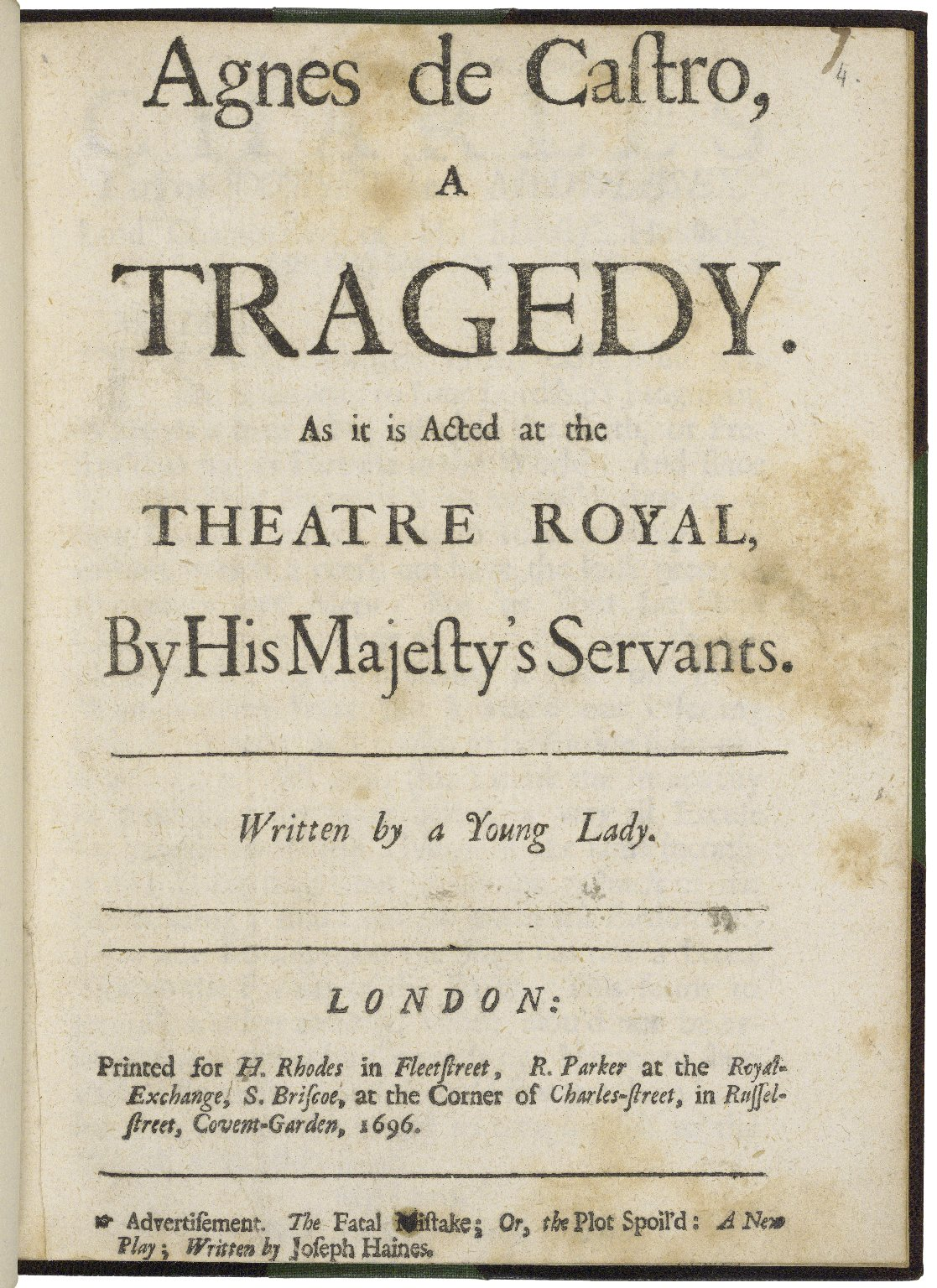
Catharine Trotter Cockburn's play Agnes de Castro (1695)

Works written in English include Aphra Behn's novel (Note: The text is a translation of the novel of the same name by French writer Jean-Baptiste de Brilhac.) Agnes de Castro, or, the Force of Generous Love (1688); and Catharine Trotter Cockburn's play Agnes de Castro (1695). Mary Russell Mitford also wrote a drama from the story entitled Inez de Castro. The Undiscovered Island, a novel in English by Darrell Kastin, features a descendant's version of the events in the tragedy of Inês de Castro and Dom Pedro. It was published in 2009 by Tagus Press, University of Mass, Dartmouth.

Felicia Hemans' poem The Coronation of Inez de Castro first appeared in The New Monthly Magazine in 1828.

She is a recurring figure in Ezra Pound's The Cantos. She appears first at the end of Canto III, in the lines Ignez da Castro murdered, and a wall/Here stripped, here made to stand.

There have been over 20 operas and ballets created about Inês de Castro. Operas from the 18th and 19th centuries include:

- Ines di Castro by Bernhard Anselm Weber (1790, Hanover)
- Ines di Castro by Niccolò Antonio Zingarelli (1798)
- Ines de Castro by Walter Savage Landor (1831)
- Ines de Castro by Giuseppe Persiani to a libretto by Salvadore Cammarano (1835)
- Ines di Castro by Pietro Antonio Coppola (1842, Lisbon)

In modern times, Inês de Castro has continued to inspire operatic works, including:

- Ines de Castro by Scottish composer James MacMillan. This work was first performed at the 1996 Edinburgh International Festival
- Wut (Rage) in German by Swiss composer Andrea Lorenzo Scartazzini. The world premiere of this work was given at the Theater Erfurt, Germany, on 9 September 2006.
- Ines de Castro by American composer Thomas Pasatieri. This work premiered in 1976 with the Baltimore Opera Company.
- Ines by Canadian composer James Rolfe. Premiered in 2009 by the Queen of Puddings Music Theatre Company in Toronto.

In addition, Portuguese composer Pedro Camacho (born 1979) composed the Requiem to Inês de Castro, first performed on March 28, 2012, in the New Cathedral of Coimbra on the occasion of 650 years of the transportation of Inês de Castro's body from Coimbra to Alcobaça Monastery. Christopher Bochman, with the Lisbon Youth Orchestra, has produced an opera "Corpo E Alma" (Body and Soul) focusing on Pedro's transition from a sensual to a spiritual love following her death, drawing on various aspects of the tale. (Note: A live recording was made with the assistance of the Portuguese Ministry of Culture and others.)

== Popular culture ==
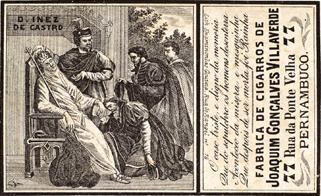
The popular legend of the hand-kissing ceremony at the coronation of Inês de Castro on a cigarette label

The 2005 TV series Pedro e Inês recounts the love story.

The 2018 film Pedro e Inês (released as The Dead Queen internationally), based on the novel by Rosa Lobato de Faria, retells the story of Inês de Castro (played by Joana de Verona) and King Pedro I of Portugal (Diogo Amaral). The film was met with some acclaim, winning 5 awards including Best Ensemble - National Competition at the CinEuphoria Awards [es] 2019. Director António Ferreira received best director award at Prémios Fantastic (2019) and Prémios Áquila (2020).

In 2014, Portuguese visual artist Paula Rego painted a portrait of Inês De Castro as a commission for the Women's Art Collection at the University of Cambridge's women-only Murray Edwards College.

== See also ==
- Quinta das Lágrimas
