= Treaty of Medina del Campo (1431) =

1431 peace treaty between Castile and Portugal

The Treaty of Medina del Campo was signed on 30 October 1431. It was a peace treaty between the Crown of Castile and the Kingdom of Portugal. The agreement was ratified in Almeirim in January 1432.

The treaty put an end to a long period of confrontations going back to the 1383–1385 Crisis and allowed both countries to resume settling and economic development along their shared border.

== See also ==
- List of treaties
