= Peter I of Portugal =

King of Portugal from 1357 to 1367

Peter I
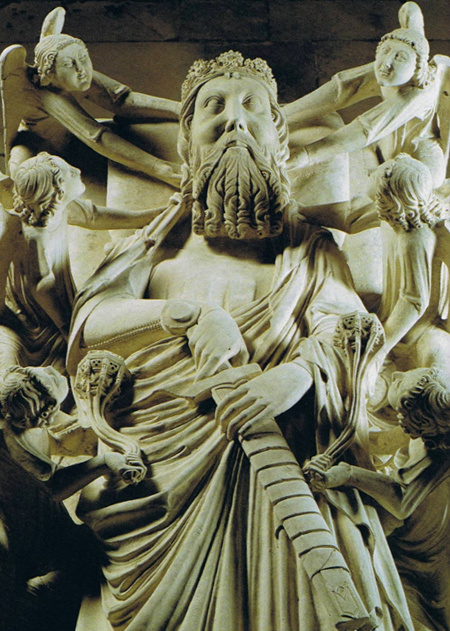
- Recumbent effigy on the tomb of King Peter I (c. 1360), Alcobaça Monastery

King of Portugal
- Reign: 28 May 1357 – 18 January 1367
- Predecessor: Afonso IV
- Successor: Ferdinand I
- Born: 8 April 1320; Coimbra, Portugal
- Died: 18 January 1367 (aged 46); Estremoz, Portugal
- Burial: Alcobaça Monastery
- Spouses: Constanza Manuel (m. 1340; died 1349) Inês de Castro (Note: In order to have his issue with Inês legitimized, Peter claimed to have married her in 1354.) (m. 1354; died 1355)
- Issue among others...: Maria, Marchioness of Tortosa; Ferdinand I; John, Duke of Valencia de Campos; Denis, Lord of Cifuentes; Beatrice, Countess of Albuquerque; John I (ill.)
- House: Burgundy
- Father: Afonso IV of Portugal
- Mother: Beatrice of Castile

Peter I (Portuguese: Pedro Afonso; [ˈpeðɾu]; 8 April 1320 – 18 January 1367), known as Peter the Justicier (Pedro o Justiceiro), was King of Portugal from 1357 until his death in 1367.

== Early life ==
Born on 8 April 1320 in Coimbra, Peter was the fifth child of Afonso of Portugal and his wife, Beatrice of Castile. Of his six siblings, only two – sisters Maria and Eleonor – survived infancy.

At six years old, shortly after his father ascended the crown, Peter was granted a retinue of six people, including his butler and tutor Lopo Fernandes Pacheco.

=== First betrothal ===
In October 1327, marriage contracts were negotiated for Peter and Blanche of Castile, granddaughter of Sancho IV of Castile and James II of Aragon, and Peter's sister Maria and the future Alfonso XI of Castile. Blanche was taken to be raised in Portugal until she was of age for marriage, where she remained for eight years. According to the Chronicle of Pedro I of Portugal by Fernão Lopes, during her stay, she began to show signs of illness and "defects of judgment" which made her unsuitable for marriage and for procreation. She was examined by physicians, including those sent by Alfonso XI, who confirmed her weak mental health and incapacity, and, because of "Infante Pedro's refusal and the evident mental disorder of doña Blanca" the proposed marriage never took place.

=== Marriage ===
In 1328, Peter's eldest sister, Maria, was married to Alfonso XI of Castile. However, soon after their marriage Alfonso began a long affair with the beautiful and newly widowed Leonor de Guzman. Maria bore Alfonso a son in 1334, who ultimately became Peter of Castile, but after the Castilian king refused to end his affair, Maria returned home to Portugal in 1335.

Alfonso had been married once before, to his cousin's daughter, Constanza Manuel (granddaughter of James II of Aragon). Alfonso had the marriage annulled in 1327, after only two years, to clear the way for marriage to Maria. This angered his cousin Juan Manuel, Prince of Villena, a powerful Castilian aristocrat, and for two years Juan Manuel waged war against the Castilians – who had kept his daughter Constanza hostage – until Bishop John del Campo of Oviedo mediated a peace in 1329.

King Afonso, now enraged by the infidelity and mistreatment of his daughter Maria, forged an alliance with Juan Manual by marrying Peter to Constanza. When Constanza arrived in Portugal in 1340, Inês de Castro, the beautiful and aristocratic daughter of a prominent Galician family (with links albeit through illegitimacy, to the Portuguese and Castilian royal families), is said to have accompanied her as her lady-in-waiting. (Note: Inês may have already been living at the Portuguese court as a noblewoman before Constanza’s arrival.)

=== Affair ===
Peter soon fell in love with Inês, and the two conducted a long love affair that lasted until Inês's murder in 1355. Constanza died in 1349, following childbirth complications. The scandal of Peter's affair with Inês, and its political ramifications, caused Afonso to banish Inês from court after Constanza died. Peter refused to marry any of the princesses his father suggested as a second wife, and the king refused to allow his son to marry Inês as Peter wanted. The two aristocratic lovers began living together in secret.

According to the chronicle of Fernão Lopes, during this period, Peter began giving Inês's brothers, exiled from the Castilian court, important positions in Portugal and they became the heir-apparent's closest advisors. This alarmed Afonso. He worried that upon his death, civil war could tear the country apart, or the Portuguese throne would fall into Castilian hands, either as Juan Manuel fought to avenge his daughter's honor, or the de Castro brothers supported their sister. Peter claimed that he had married Inês against his father's orders. In any event, in 1355, Afonso sent three men to find Inês at the Monastery of Santa Clara-a-Velha in Coimbra, where she was detained, and they decapitated her in front of one of her young children.

Enraged, Peter revolted against his father. Afonso defeated his son within a year. In a truce signed 15 August 1356, Peter swore to obey his father and pardon the men that murdered Inês. Peter succeeded to the throne just months later in May 1357.

== Reign ==
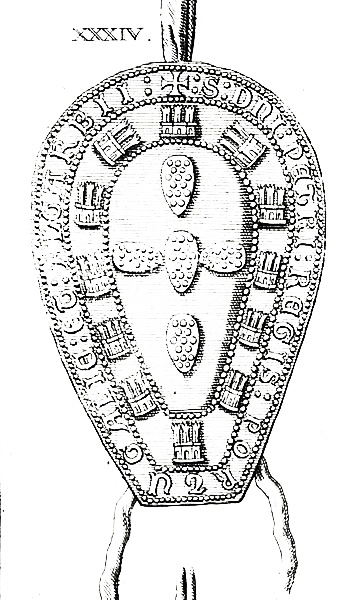
Seal of Peter I.

Peter reigned for a decade, and is often confused with his Castilian nephew because of their identical nicknames. Fernão Lopes labels Peter "the Just" and said that the Portuguese king loved justice—especially the dispensing of it, which he enjoyed doing for himself. Inês' assassins received his harshest punishment: the three had escaped to Castile, but Peter arranged for them to be exchanged for Castilian fugitives residing in Portugal with his nephew, Peter of Castile. The Portuguese king conducted a public trial of Pêro Coelho and Álvaro Gonçalves in 1361. After finding them guilty of Inês' murder, the king ripped their hearts out with his own hands, according to Lopes, because of what they had done to his own heart. Diogo Lopes Pacheco escaped.

According to legend, Peter later had Inês' body exhumed and placed upon a throne, dressed in rich robes and jewels, and required all of his vassals to kiss the hand of the deceased "queen". However, contemporary evidence that the event occurred is minimal; Peter did have Inês' body removed from her resting place in Coimbra and taken to Alcobaça where it was reburied in the royal monastery.

=== Death and burial ===
After falling seriously ill in Estremoz in January 1367, Peter drafted his final will. He also forgave Diogo Lopes Pacheco, believing him to be innocent of murdering Inês. The King died the morning of 18 January 1367.

Peter had two tombs constructed for himself and Inês, so they would see each other when rising at the Last Judgment. The tombs show Peter and Inês facing each other, with the words "Até o fim do mundo..." ("Until the end of the world...") inscribed on the marble.

== Legacy ==
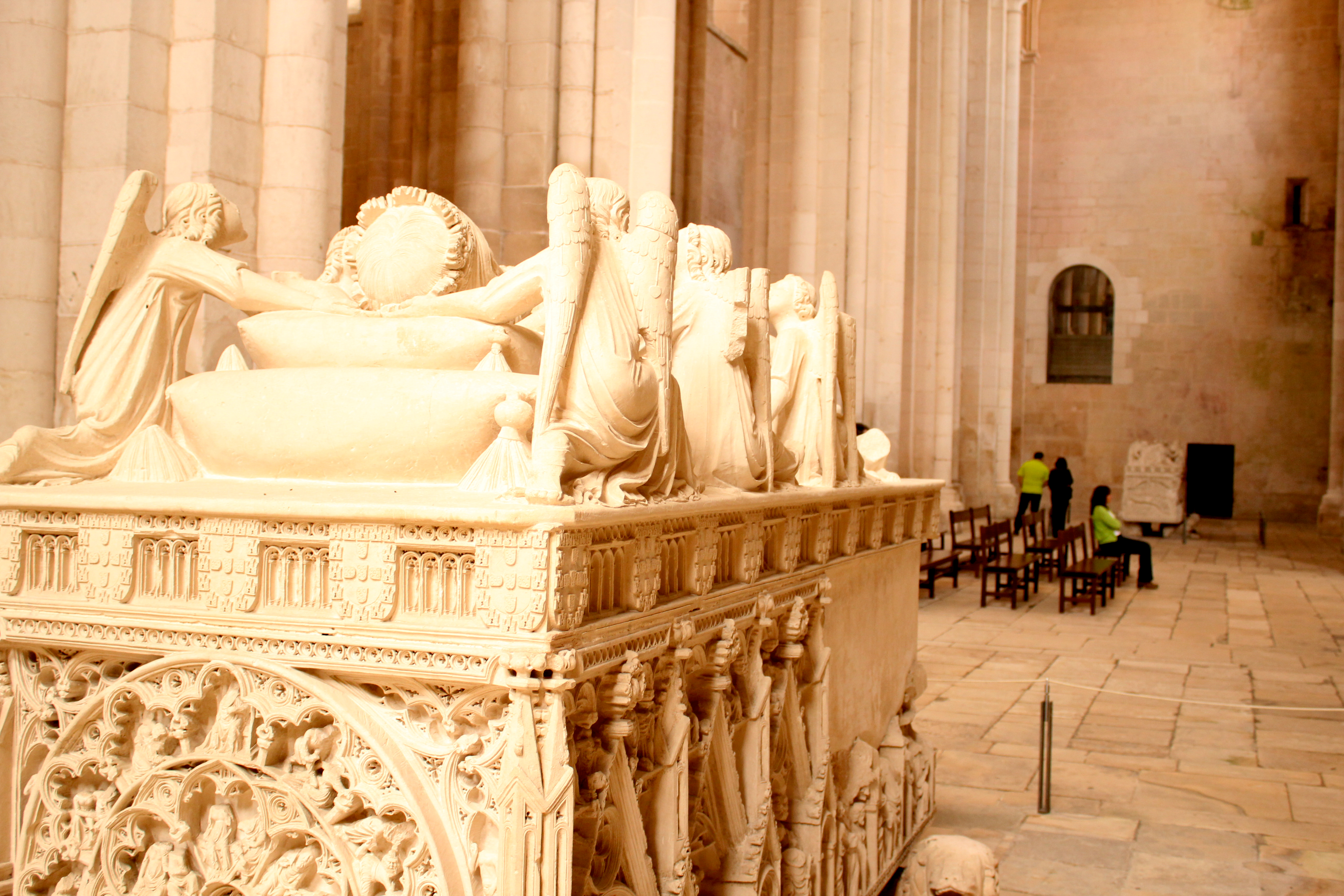
The tomb of Peter I, facing the tomb of Inês against the far wall

Peter's love affair with Inês de Castro and father-son conflict between him and Afonso IV inspired more than twenty operas and many writers, including: the Portuguese national epic Os Lusíadas by Luís de Camões, the Spanish Nise lastimosa and Nise laureada (1577) by Jerónimo Bermúdez and Reinar despues de morir by Luís Vélez de Guevara, as well as Inez de Castro by Mary Russell Mitford and Henry de Montherlant's French drama La Reine morte.

== Marriage and descendants ==
Name	Birth	Death	Notes
Constanza Manuel (c. 1318–1349; married on 24 August 1340)
Maria	6 April 1342	1377	Marchioness of Tortosa by marriage to infante Fernando of Aragon, Marquis of Tortosa (son of King Alfonso IV of Aragon and his second wife, Eleanor of Castile).
Luís	1344	1344	Lived only eight days.
Ferdinand	31 October 1345	22 October 1383	Succeeded him as King of Portugal.
Daughter (possibly named Maria)	1349	1349	Died shortly after birth.
Inês de Castro (c. 1325–1355; possibly married in 1354)
Afonso	1350	1350	Died shortly after his birth.
John	1352	ca. 1396	Lord of Porto de Mós, Seia and Montelongo, also Duke of Valencia de Campos. Claimant to the throne during the 1383–85 Crisis.
Denis	1353	ca. 1403	Lord of Villar-Dompardo, Cifuentes, Escalona and Alvar de Tormes. Claimant to the throne during the 1383–85 Crisis.
Beatrice	1354	1381	Countess of Alburquerque by marriage to Sancho of Castile, Count of Alburquerque.
Teresa Lourenço (c. 1330–?)
John	11 April 1357	14 August 1433	Natural son. Grand Master of the Order of Aviz. Succeeded his half-brother Ferdinand I after the 1383–85 Crisis as John I, 10th King of Portugal, the first of the House of Aviz.

== See also ==
- Quinta das Lágrimas
- Chronicle of the King D. Pedro I (by Fernão Lopes)

== Notes ==
Peter I of Portugal House of Burgundy Cadet branch of the House of Capet Born: 8 April 1320 Died: 18 January 1367
Regnal titles
Preceded by Afonso IV	King of Portugal; 1357–1367	Succeeded by Ferdinand I
