= Battle of Aljubarrota =

Decisive final battle of the Portuguese Interregnum of 1383–85

- Part of the Portuguese Crisis of 1383–85
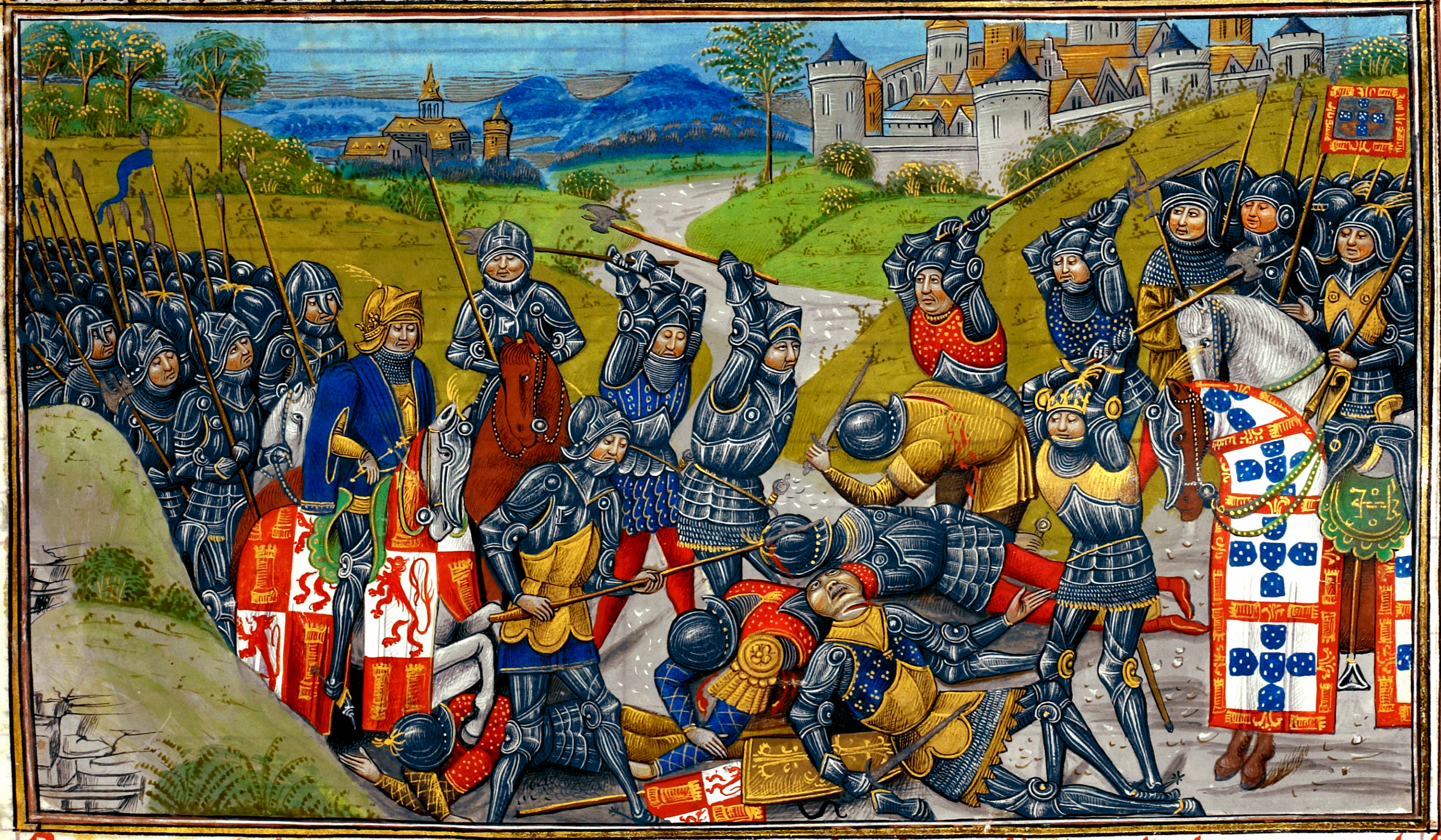
- Illustration of the Battle of Aljubarrota by Jean de Wavrin
Date	14 August 1385
Location	Calvaria de Cima, (Note: Close to Aljubarrota) Porto de Mós, Central Portugal 39°38′22″N 8°50′40″W
Result	Portuguese victory

Belligerents
Kingdom of Portugal; Supported by: Kingdom of England	Crown of Castile; Supported by: Kingdom of France; Crown of Aragon; Genoese volunteers

Commanders and leaders
John I of Portugal; Nuno Álvares Pereira	John I of Castile; Pedro Álvares Pereira †; Pedro López de Ayala

Strength
About 6,600 men: 4,000 foot soldiers; 1,700 lances; 800 crossbowmen; 200 English longbowmen	About 31,000 men: 15,000 foot soldiers; 6,000 lances; 8,000 crossbowmen; More than 2,000 French heavy knights; 15 mortars

Casualties and losses
Fewer than 1,000	4,000–5,000; 5,000 in the aftermath

The Battle of Aljubarrota was fought between the Kingdom of Portugal and the Crown of Castile on 14 August 1385. Forces commanded by King John I of Portugal and his Constable Nuno Álvares Pereira, with the support of English allies, opposed the army of King John I of Castile with its Aragonese and French allies, as well as Genoese mercenaries at São Jorge, between the towns of Leiria and Alcobaça, in central Portugal. The result was a decisive victory for the Portuguese, ruling out Castilian ambitions to the Portuguese throne, ending the 1383–85 Crisis and assuring John's position as King of Portugal.

Portuguese independence was safeguarded and a new dynasty, the House of Aviz, was established. Scattered border confrontations with Castilian troops would persist until the death of John I of Castile in 1390, but these posed no real threat to the new dynasty.

== Prelude ==
The end of the 14th century in Europe was a time of revolution and crisis, with the Hundred Years' War between the English and the French for Western France, the Black Death devastating the continent, and famine afflicting the poor. Portugal was no exception. In October 1383, King Ferdinand I of Portugal died with no son to inherit the crown. The only surviving child of his marriage with Leonor Telles de Meneses was a girl, Princess Beatrice of Portugal.

In April of that same year Ferdinand had signed the Treaty of Salvaterra de Magos with King Juan I of Castile. The treaty determined that Beatrice was to marry Juan, and the Crown of Portugal would belong to the descendants of their union. This situation left the majority of the Portuguese discontented, and the Portuguese nobility was unwilling to support the claim of the princess as that could lead to the incorporation of Portugal into Castile. (Note: At this time (14th century), Castile is not synonymous with "Spain". A global Iberian political entity, had first appeared as a Visigothic Kingdom in the very end of the era of the Roman Empire was dismantled after the Muslim invasion of 711. After that, the word "Spain" was used to designate the Iberian peninsula from a geographical and cultural and even political point of view. The proper term which more enlightened scholars use is Iberia, the geographical vast peninsula, encompassing Portugal, an autonomous kingdom since 1139, and several other kingdoms. These other kingdoms eventually agglutinated under one central power, Castile, and named Spain, after Hispania which was hitherto used in the plural (Hispaniae or the Spains) to refer to all of the nations on the Iberia peninsula. The country 'appeared' in the second half of the 15th century, with the marriage of the Catholic Monarchs – Isabel of Castile and Ferdinand of Aragon – the rulers, together, of the Crown of Castile, (the union of the kingdoms of Castile, León, Galicia, Asturias, the Canary Islands and the later conquered kingdom of Granada) and the Crown of Aragon (Aragon, Catalonia, Valencia, the Balearic Islands, Sicily and other territories in the Italian Peninsula).) Also, the powerful merchants of the capital, Lisbon, were enraged at being excluded from the negotiations. Without an undisputed option, Portugal remained without a king from 1383–85, in an interregnum known as the 1383–85 Crisis, with Queen Leonor acting as regent for her ten-year-old daughter.

The first clear act of hostility was carried out in December 1383 by the faction of John (João), the Grand Master of the Military Order of Aviz (and a natural son of Peter I of Portugal), with the murder of João Fernandes Andeiro, the Count of Ourém, adviser and lover of Queen Leonor. This prompted the Lisbon merchants to name John "rector and defender of the realm". However, the Castilian king would not relinquish his and his wife's claims to the Portuguese throne. In an effort to normalize the situation and secure the crown for himself or Beatrice, he forced Leonor to abdicate from the regency. In April 1384, in Alentejo, a punitive Castilian expedition was promptly defeated by Nuno Álvares Pereira, leading a much smaller Portuguese army at the Battle of Atoleiros. This was an example of the use of the defensive tactic of forming an infantry square to repel cavalry, reportedly without any casualties to the Portuguese.

A larger second expedition led by the Castilian king himself reached and besieged Lisbon for four months in the summer of 1384, before being forced to retreat by a shortage of food supplies due to harassment from Nuno Álvares Pereira, and an outbreak of the bubonic plague.

In order to secure his claim, John of Aviz engaged in politics and intense diplomatic negotiations with both the Holy See and England. In October 1384, Richard II wrote to John, reporting on negotiations conducted in England with John's envoys (Dom Fernando, master of the order of Santiago, and Laurence Fogaça, chancellor of Portugal), confirming that an agreement had been reached under which a small English contingent was to be sent to Portugal to help defend it against Castile (an ally of France at this time). On 6 April 1385, (the anniversary of the "miraculous" battle of Atoleiros, a fortuitous date), the Portuguese Cortes assembled in Coimbra and acclaimed John of Aviz as King John I of Portugal. After his accession to the throne, John proceeded to annex the cities whose military commanders supported Princess Beatrice and her husband's claims, namely Caminha, Braga, and Guimarães among others.

Enraged by this "rebellion", Juan I ordered a two-pronged invasion of Portugal in May 1385 by an army of 31,000 men. The smaller northern force sacked and burnt towns along the border, before being defeated by local Portuguese nobles at the battle of Trancoso in the first week of June. On the news of the invasion by the Castilians, John I of Portugal's army joined with the forces led by Álvares Pereira (now Constable of Portugal) at the town of Tomar. There they decided to face the Castilians before they could get close to Lisbon and lay siege to it again.

English mercenaries arrived from Gascony at Easter 1385, sent to honor the Anglo-Portuguese Treaty of 1373 (still the oldest active international treaty in the world). This company was composed of about 200 English longbowmen, veterans from the Hundred Years' War, and around 500 locally recruited men-at-arms mostly of English and Gascon background, though a Florentine volunteer was also mentioned.

The Portuguese and their allies set out to intercept the invading Castilian army near the town of Leiria. Álvares Pereira took on the task of choosing the ground for the battle. Russell notes that two Portuguese generals (Nuno Álvares Periera and Antão Vasques de Almada) had already shown themselves masters of the new developments in methods of warfare, i.e. the combined use of archers and dismounted men-at-arms on the defensive. The chosen location was São Jorge near Aljubarrota, especially suitable as a defensive position, being a small flattened hill surrounded by creeks with the small settlement of Chão da Feira at its widest point, still present today.

By placing his army on the road to Lisbon, John of Aviz effectively distracted John of Castile from laying siege to the capital itself, forcing the Castilians to offer battle there on Portuguese terms. As in the Battle of Agincourt, winning this pitched battle would mean a decisive victory for Aviz's cause, even with smaller numbers and resources.

== Portuguese dispositions ==
At around 10 o'clock in the morning of 14 August 1385, the army of John of Aviz took its position at the north side of this hill, facing the road where the Castilians would soon appear. As in other defensive battles of the 14th century (Bannockburn (1314), Crécy (1346) and Poitiers (1356), for example), the dispositions were as following: dismounted cavalry and infantry in the centre with archers occupying the flanks. Notably, on the vanguard's left wing (later covering the left flank), a company composed by some two hundred unmarried young nobles is remembered to history as the "Ala dos Namorados" (Lovers' Flank); the right wing, also two hundred strong, known as "Ala de Madressilva" or Honeysuckle Flank, did not achieve the same heroic fame. On either side, the army was protected by natural obstacles, in this case creeks and steep slopes. In the rear, reserve forces were at hand, commanded by John of Aviz himself. In this elevated position, the Portuguese could observe the enemy's arrival and were protected by a steep slope in their front. The rear of the Portuguese position, which became its front later in the battle, was at the top of a narrow slope which came up to a small village, and was further defended by a complex series of interlocking trenches and caltrops designed to surprise and trap the enemy cavalry. These field fortifications were used extensively by both the English in France and the Portuguese in the rare set-piece battles of the Crisis of the Succession.

Contrary to previous popular belief that the Portuguese men-at-arms with John of Aviz side were badly equipped, and that his foot soldiers were almost unarmored, there is no reason to believe the Portuguese knightly class, even the ones on Aviz's side — as most of the upper nobility supported John of Castile - were not able to afford the knightly harness expected in the same Iberian standards of its time. And while the Portuguese primary sources use the comparative inferiority of Portuguese equipment to increase the glory of their victory, this should be considered in light of the fact that most of the fighting by the Castilian side involved heavily armored men-at-arms, and by jinetes (light cavalry) armed with at least a combination of mail and padded armor.

Frei Pedro, in his sermon given at Lisbon after the battle, describes the Portuguese equipment: "The Portuguese [...] were poorly and badly armed; here, the one that had mail armor didn't have padded armor, and the one that had a cuirass didn't have arm harness, and many of them with open-faced bascinets. So that if all their arms were matched as they should, it won't equip a third of the people". While this equipment would be inferior to the standards expected from a man-at-arms, it would otherwise be quite adequate for actual infantry, which composed most of Lisbon's host. Other sources mention Portuguese arms as: "everyone's defensive arms were bascinets with camail, either open-faced or with visor, and coats of plates, padded armor, mail shirts, mail skirts and cuirasses; and for offensive spears and pollaxes of iron and lead, and axes for those who could have them".

== Castile arrives ==
Diagram of the progress of the battle

The Castilian vanguard arrived from the north around midday. Seeing the strong defensive position occupied by the Portuguese, John of Castile decided to avoid combat on John of Portugal's terms. Due to the size of the Castilian army, it slowly started to contour around the hill where the Portuguese were. Castilian scouts had noticed that the south side of the hill had a gentler slope and it was there that the Castilian king wanted to attack.

In response to this movement, the Portuguese army reversed its position and headed to the south slope of the hill. Since they were fewer than the enemy and had less ground to cover, they reached their final position very early in the afternoon. To calm the soldiers' nervousness and to improve his army's defensive position, Álvares Pereira ordered the construction of defensive ditches, pits and caltrops. This application of contemporary English tactical procedures had also been used by the Portuguese at Atoleiros and was especially effective against cavalry (the specialty of both the Castilian and the French armies).

Around six o'clock in the afternoon the Castilian army was finally ready for battle. According to John of Castile's report of the battle, his soldiers were by then very tired from the march that had started early in the morning under a blazing August sun. There was no time to halt then, and the battle would soon begin.

== Battle ==
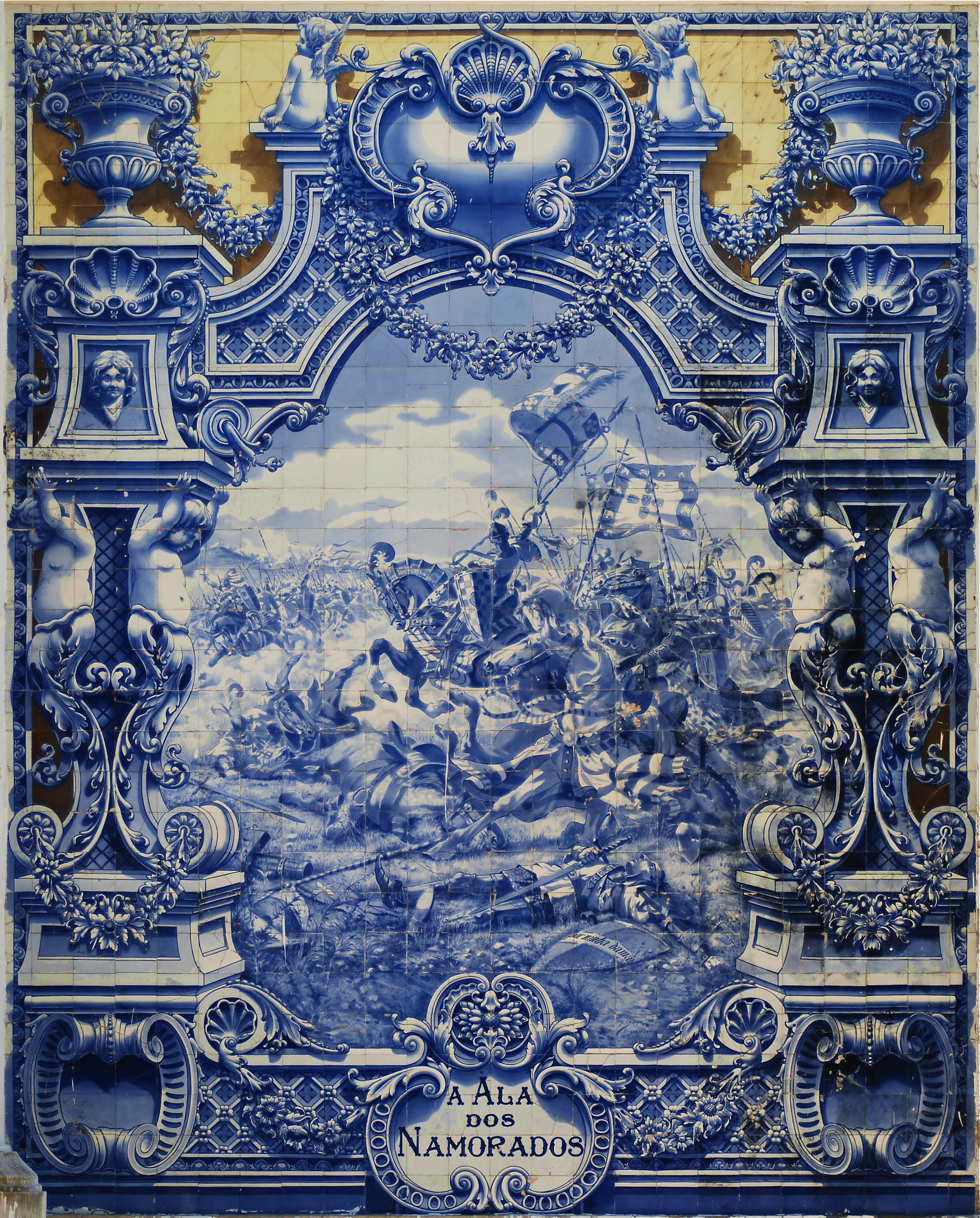
Panel of azulejo glazed tiles by Jorge Colaço (1922), representing the Ala dos Namorados during the battle of Aljubarrota. On the fallen knight's shield can be read "for my lady". Lisboa, Pavilhão Carlos Lopes.

The initiative of starting the battle was with the Castilian side. The French allied heavy cavalry charged in full strength, in order to disrupt the enemy lines. According to Jean Froissart, based on visual testimonies of the battle: "The French knights amounted to two thousand, as gallant lances as could be seen. The moment they perceived the enemy they formed in close order, like men of resolution who knew their business, and advanced within bow-shot".

As was frequent in many battles during this period, the impulsive charge of the French cavalry proved disastrous, as they were too far ahead of the rest of the Castilian army to receive any support, and were charging uphill at a narrow fortified defensive position while being pelted with showers of arrows and crossbow bolts, which killed many horses, injured some men, and caused confusion. The French, however, being heavily armored, were still able to enter close combat with the Portuguese vanguard, where heavy fighting ensued with the dismounted Portuguese and Anglo-Gascon men-at-arms. The losses of the French cavalry were heavy and the effect of its attack completely null. Support from the Castilian rear was late to come and the knights that did not perish in the combat were made prisoners and sent to the Portuguese rear.

Froissart claims envy was the reason behind why the Spaniards were undisposed to help the French, held to be the best heavy cavalry of Europe, and highly prized by the King of Castile himself:

"It is also true, that the battle began too soon; but they did so to acquire greater honour, and to make their words good which they had said in the presence of the king. On the other hand, as I have heard, the Castilians made no great haste to advance, for the French were not in good favour with them, and they had said, "Let them begin the fight, and tire themselves: they will find enough to do. These Frenchmen are too great boasters, and too vainglorious, and our king has not any perfect confidence but in them. Since he wishes that they should have the honour of the day, it shall be so; for we will have it our own way, or not at all." Conformably to this resolution, the Spaniards kept in a large body, twenty thousand at least, in the plain, and would not advance, which vexed the king much; but he could not help it, for they said, "My lord, it is all over, (though none had returned from the battle): these French knights have defeated your enemies: the honour and victory of the day are theirs.".

As few of the Frenchmen managed to escape, most were either slain or taken prisoner. When the main Castilian force entered the battle, they caused a great impression due to their order, equipment, and numbers. In order to get to the Portuguese line, however, the Castilians became disorganized, squeezing into the space between the two creeks that protected the flanks. At this time, the Portuguese reorganized. The vanguard under Álvares Pereira divided into two sections, while John of Portugal ordered the archers and crossbowmen to retire, and advanced the reserves into the space thus opened. With all his troops needed at the front, there were no men available to guard the French prisoners, and John of Portugal ordered them to be killed on the spot and proceeded to deal with the approaching Castilians.. According to Froissart, however, Aviz's war council decided to slay their prisoners before the main body of Castile arrived, after the French cavalry failure, killing many knights, esquires and non-noble men-at-arms.

Advancing uphill with the sun on their backs, squeezed between the funnelling Portuguese defensive works and their own advancing rear, and under a heavy rain of English longbow arrows loosed from behind the Portuguese line and crossbow bolts from behind both the Sweethearts' and the Honeysuckle wings on their flanks, the Castilians fought to win the day. The Castilian knights in the main body were forced to dismount and break in half their four-metre-long lances in order to join the constricted melèe alongside their infantry.

At this stage of the battle, both sides sustained heavy losses, especially on the "Ala dos Namorados" where the Portuguese students became renowned for holding off the heavily-armoured knights of the Castilian wings who, still on horseback, attempted to flank the Portuguese lines. A similar attack was more successful on the right "Honeysuckle" flank, though only briefly and late in the fight.

By sunset, only one hour after the battle began, the Castilian situation was untenable. When the Castilian royal standard-bearer fell, the already-demoralized troops in their rear thought their King was dead and started to flee in panic; in a matter of moments this became a general rout where Juan of Castile had to run at full speed to save his life, leaving behind not only common soldiers but also many still dismounted noblemen.

The Portuguese pursued them down the hill and, with the battle won, killed many more while there was still light enough to see the enemy.

John of Aviz, described as tall and strong, made a great impression during the battle, first mounted on a stallion caparisoned with the arms of Portugal, but later described as fighting on foot during the melee at the pass, giving hard strokes with his poleaxe and "knocking down three or four of the stoutest of the enemy, insomuch that none dared to approach him". The poleaxe, which seems to have been his favorite weapon, substituted for the honoured place of the longsword during his funeral procession.

== Aftermath ==
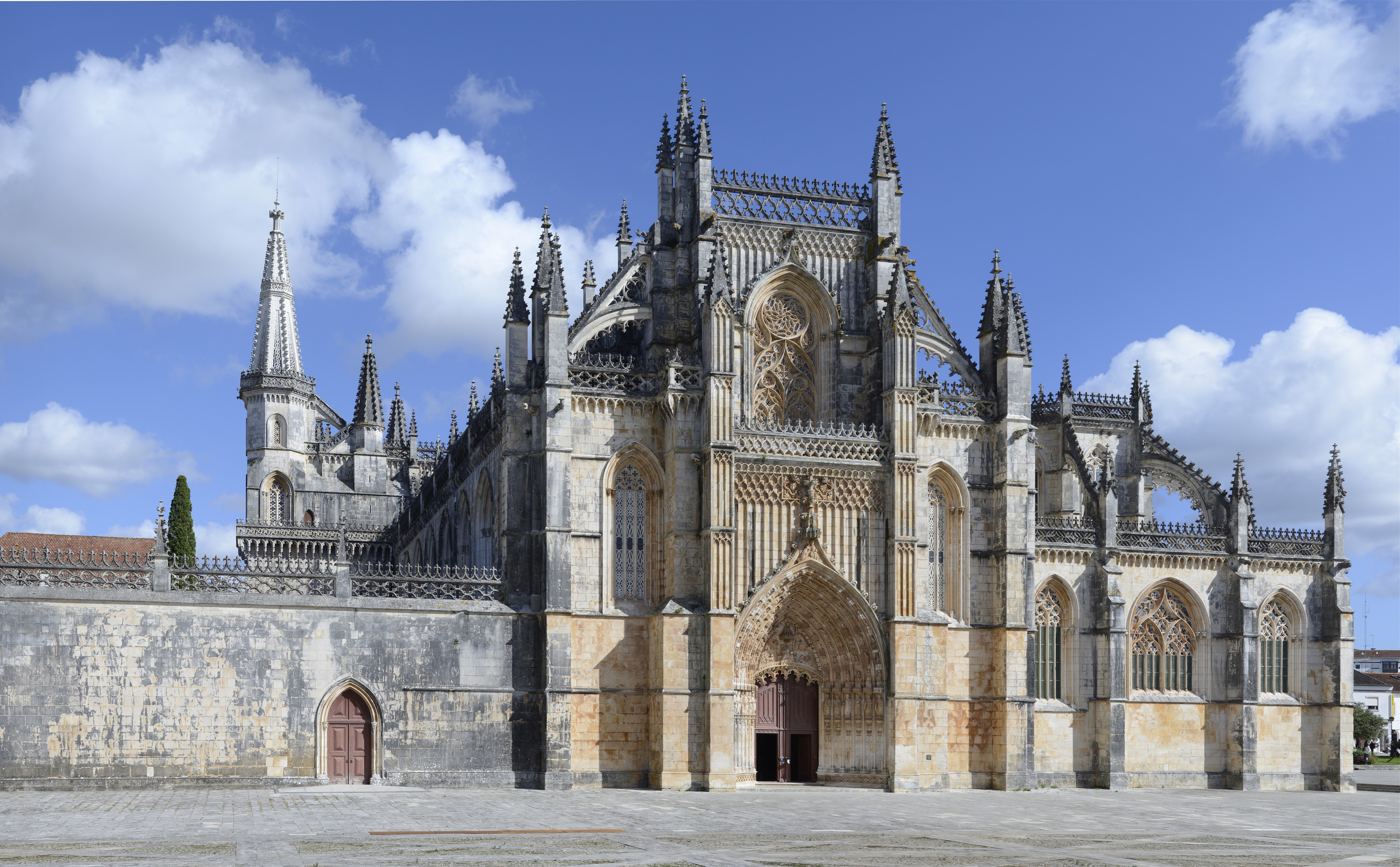
The Batalha Monastery

During the night and throughout the next day, as many as 5000 more Castilians were killed by the neighbouring inhabitants; according to Portuguese tradition surrounding the battle, there was a woman called Brites de Almeida, the Padeira de Aljubarrota (the baker-woman of Aljubarrota), said to be very tall and strong, and to possess six fingers on each hand, who by herself killed seven Castilian soldiers as they were hiding in her bakery in the town of Aljubarrota after the battle. This story is clouded in legend and hearsay, but the popular intervention in the massacre of Castilian troops after the battle is, nevertheless, considered historical.

On the morning of the following day, the true dimension of the battle was revealed. In the field, the bodies of Castilians were enough to dam the creeks surrounding the small hill. In face of this, John of Portugal offered the enemy survivors amnesty and free transit home. Leading figures of the Castilian nobility perished that day, as well as complete army units (such as that of the Castilian city of Soria). An official period of mourning was decreed in Castile that would last until Christmas 1387.

In October 1385, Álvares Pereira led a preemptive attack against Mérida in Castilian territory, defeating an even larger Castilian army than at Aljubarrota in the battle of Valverde, in Valverde de Mérida. Scattered border skirmishes with Castilian troops would persist for five years more until the death of John I of Castile in 1390, but posed no real threat to the Portuguese crown; recognition from Castile would arrive only in 1411 with the signing of the Treaty of Ayllón (Segovia).

This victory of Aljubarrota confirmed John of Aviz as the uncontested King of Portugal and the House of Aviz ascended to the crown of Portugal. In 1386, the closeness of relations between Portugal and England resulted in a permanent military alliance with the Treaty of Windsor, the oldest still active in existence.

John's marriage to Philippa of Lancaster in 1387 initiated the Portuguese second dynasty, and their children went on to make historically significant contributions. Duarte, or Edward of Portugal, became the eleventh King of Portugal known as "The Philosopher" and "The Eloquent", and his brother Prince Henrique, or Henry the Navigator, sponsored expeditions to Africa.

To celebrate his victory and acknowledge divine help, John I of Portugal ordered the construction of the monastery of Santa Maria da Vitória na Batalha and the founding of the town of Batalha close to the site where the battle was fought. The monastery represents one of the best original examples of Late Gothic architecture in Portugal, intermingled with the Manueline style. The king, his wife Philippa of Lancaster, and several of his sons are buried in this monastery.

In 1393, a chapel in honor of St. Mary and St. George was erected in the place where the standard of D. Nuno Álvares Pereira had been during the confrontation, allowing us to know the precise geographic location of the battle site.

In 1958, archaeologist Afonso do Paço organized the first campaign of excavations, revealing the complex defensive system consisting of about 800 pits and dozens of defensive ditches and revealing one of the best preserved battlefields of the period of the Hundred Years' War.

In March 2002, under the initiative of António Champalimaud, the Battle of Aljubarrota Foundation was created. The first of its activities was to recover the battlefield of Aljubarrota. Through a protocol established by the Ministry of Defense in August 2003, the Foundation received authorization to transform the Military Museum into a modern Interpretation Center of the Battle of Aljubarrota. This Interpretation Center was inaugurated on 11 October 2008.

On 28 December 2010, the Portuguese Official Journal published the Decret-Law n.º 18/2010, which states the legal recognition of the battlefield of Aljubarrota with the category of "National Monument".

== Sources ==
- Duarte, Luís Miguel (2007). Aljubarrota 1383 / 1389 (in Portuguese). Quidnovi. ISBN 9789728998875.
- Edward McMurdo, The History of Portugal (2); The History of Portugal from the Reign of D. Diniz to the reign of D. Afonso V, General Books LLC, (2009)
- Monteiro, João Gouveia (2003). Aljubarrota — A Batalha Real (in Portuguese). Tribuna. ISBN 9789728799724.
- A. H. de Oliveira Marques, História de Portugal (in Portuguese)
- Luís Miguel Duarte, Batalhas da História de Portugal- Guerra pela Independência, Lisboa, QUIDNOVI, imp. 2006
- Charles William Previté-Orton, The Shorter Cambridge Medieval History (2), Cambridge University Press, (1975)
- Russell, Sir Peter (1955). The English Intervention in Spain & Portugal in the time of Edward III and Richard II. UK: Oxford Clarendon Press. p. 397.
- ("Chronicle of king Fernando I") Crónica de el-rei D. Fernando, first published 1816 in J.F. Correia da Serra, editor, Collecção de livros ineditos de historia portugueza, Vol.IV Lisbon: Academia das Ciências de Lisboa.
- ("Chronicle of king John I, Part I & Part II") Chronica del Rey D. Ioam I de Boa Memoria, e dos Reys de Portugal o Decimo, Primeira Parte, em Que se contem A Defensam do Reyno até ser eleito Rey & Segunda Parte, em que se continuam as guerras com Castella, desde o Principio de seu reinado ate as pazes , first published 1644, Lisbon: A. Alvarez.
