= Pedro Muñiz de Godoy y Sandoval =

Cross of the Order of Santiago.

Pedro Muñiz de Godoy y Sandoval (d.14 October,1385) was a Castilian Spanish noble, in the service of Henry II of Castile, and John I of Castile. He was the Grand Master of several military orders including the Order of Alcántara, the Order of Calatrava, the Order of Santiago and adelantado of Andalucía. He was killed at the Battle of Valverde in 1385, in the 1383–1385 Portuguese crisis.

He was a claimed ancestry of Manuel Godoy, 1st Prince of the Peace, First Secretary of State of Spain from 1792 to 1797 and from 1801 and 1808, who was known for his unpopularity in ruling Spain through the French Revolutionary and Napoleonic Wars, by being a favorite of King Charles IV of Spain and Queen Maria Luisa.

== See also ==
- Order of Calatrava
- List of grand masters of the Order of Calatrava

Preceded by Martín López de Córdoba	Grand Master of the Order of Alcántara; 1369–1369	Succeeded by Melendo Suárez
Preceded by Martín López de Córdoba	Grand Master of the Order of Calatrava; 1371–1384	Succeeded by Pedro Álvarez Pereira
Preceded by Pedro Fernández Cabeza de Vaca	Grand Master of the Order of Santiago; 1384–1385	Succeeded by García Fernández de Villagarcía
