= Pedro Álvares Pereira =

Portuguese noble

Dom Pedro Álvares Pereira (Portuguese pronunciation: [ˈpeðɾu ˈalvɐɾɨʃ pɨˈɾɐjɾɐ]; 13?? – 14 August 1385) was a Portuguese noble of the 14th century.

He was the son of Marinha Domingues and Álvaro Gonçalves Pereira, to whom he succeed after his death as patriarch of the Pereira family and as Prior of Crato (leader of the Knights Hospitaller in Portugal). He was the older brother of the Constable of Portugal, Dom Nuno Álvares Pereira.

He became an ally of Dona Leonor Teles, and during the Portuguese crisis of 1383–1385 he supported the claims to the Portuguese throne of John I of Castile, who would nominate him Master of the Castilian Order of Calatrava.

Fighting for John I of Castile, he participated in the Battle of Atoleiros where he was defeated by his brother, Nuno Álvares Pereira, and was one of the few survivors from the Castilian army. In the Battle of Aljubarrota he led a Castilian charge against the Portuguese rearguard, but he died soon after while running away from his brother's army.

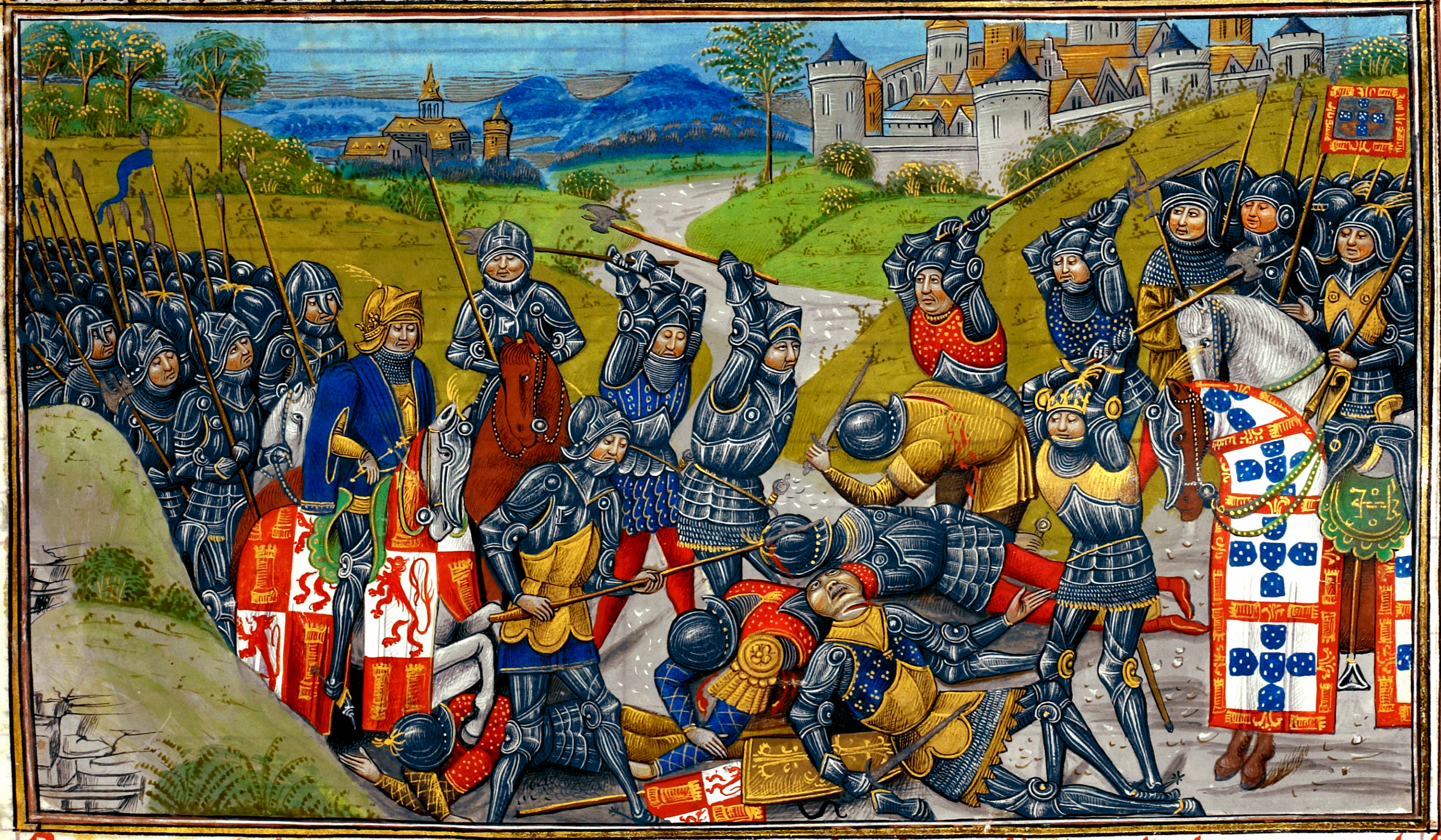
The Battle of Aljubarrota

== See also ==
- History of Portugal
- Kingdom of Portugal
- House of Avis
- House of Burgundy
- Hundred Years War
