= Battle of Valverde (1385) =

Battle of the Portuguese Crisis of 1383–1385

- Part of the Portuguese Crisis of 1383–1385
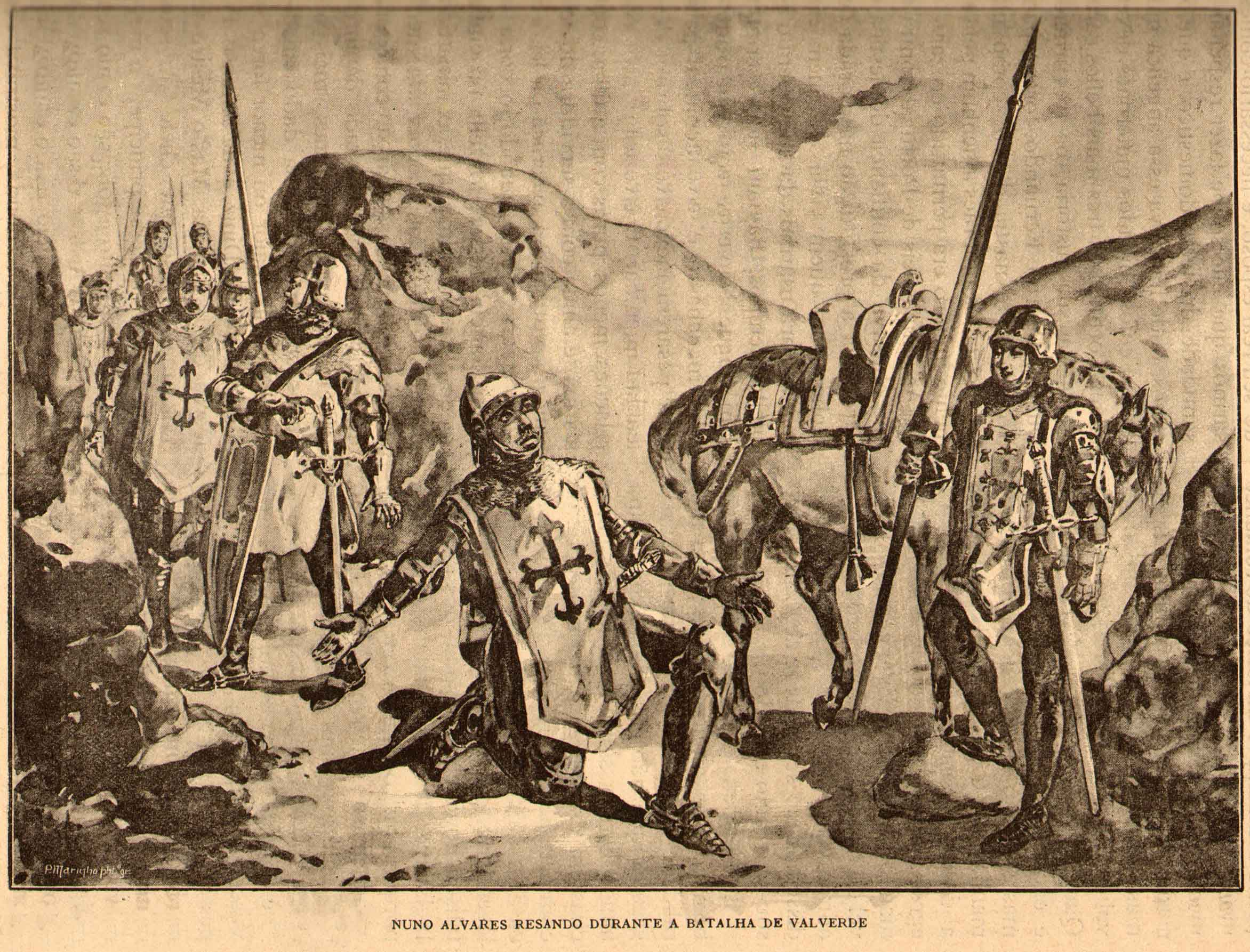
- Nuno Álvares praying during the battle of Valverde (illustration by Roque Gameiro, c. 1899)
Date	15 October 1385
Location	Valverde de Mérida, Castile
Result	Portuguese victory

Belligerents
Kingdom of Portugal	Crown of Castile

Commanders and leaders
Nuno Álvares Pereira	Pedro Muñiz de Godoy y Sandoval †

Strength
About 3,000 men: 2,000 foot soldiers; 1,000 lances; Several crossbowmen	About 20,000 men

Casualties and losses
High	Very High

The Battle of Valverde was fought on 15 October 1385, near Valverde de Mérida, Castile, between the Kingdom of Portugal and the Crown of Castile, and was part of the Portuguese Crisis of 1383–1385.

== Prelude ==
Two months after the decisive Portuguese victory in the Battle of Aljubarrota, the Constable of Portugal Nuno Álvares Pereira had decided to take the offensive and invade Castile.

The Portuguese army departed from Estremoz, passing by Vila Viçosa and Olivença. He then entered into Castilian territory, where he took Villagarcia, which he found undefended, from here he then proceeded to the town of Valverde.

While waiting for reinforcements, the Castilians marched on to face the Portuguese and prevent them from crossing the river Guadiana. The Castilian reinforcements were made up mainly of local townspeople and the army numbered about 20,000 men, with the presence of several nobles. Among them, the Master of the Order of Calatrava, Gonzalo Núñez de Guzman, the Master of the Order of Alcántara, the Portuguese Martim Anes de Barbuda and Pedro Muñiz de Godoy y Sandoval, Grand Master of the Order of Santiago.

== Battle ==
A portion of the Castilian army crossed the river and placed themselves on the opposite shore, while the rest remained where they were with the plan of surrounding the Portuguese while they crossed the river. Nuno Álvares Pereira then ordered his army to form a square with the baggage on the center, and impetuously crossed the Castilian forces, which attempted to oppose him. Upon reaching the river shore, Nuno Álvares Pereira ordered his rearguard to protect the baggage and fight the enemy, while with his vanguard he crossed over. The Castilian forces on the opposite shore, numbering about 10,000 men, unsuccessfully oppose their landing. After placing the Portuguese vanguard in position, defending the shore from the Castilians, Nuno Álvares Pereira again crossed the river to reach his rearguard, which was under a rain of arrows launched from the Castilian side. The Constable of Portugal noticing that the Castilians had used all of their projectiles, ordered an attack. Nuno Álvares Pereira himself, seeing the banner of the Grand Master of Santiago, fought his way through the Castilian army until encountering him, and after a brief duel, the Grand Master fell mortally wounded. With his fall and the overthrow of his standard, the Castilian army demoralized and was soon broken and in disorder, and could not stop the Portuguese attack, being quickly and totally defeated.

== Aftermath ==
The Portuguese army pursued the Castilians till nightfall, returning to Portugal in the morning. The disaster that Castile experienced at Aljubarrota was thus quickly followed by another crushing defeat at Valverde. Most of the Portuguese towns that were still occupied by the Castilians soon surrendered to John I of Portugal.

== See also ==
- History of Portugal
- House of Avis
- Battle of Trancoso
- Battle of Atoleiros
- Hundred Years War
- João das Regras
- Treaty of Windsor (1386)
