= Leonor de Alvim =

Portuguese noblewomen (c. 1356–1388)

Leonor de Alvim (c. 1356 – 1388) was a Portuguese noblewoman. She belonged to a family from Entre-Douro-e-Minho and was the daughter of João Pires de Alvim and his wife Branca Pires Coelho. She became the heir to her father due to the lack of male children.

She was born in Reborda, Portugal and married off to Constable Nuno Álvares Pereira. They moved to Pedraça and lived in the manor known as "Casa da Torre". When, in 1387, D. John I of Portugal called for all courts to report to Braga, Nuno Álvares Pereira was still there as a proxy for the noblemen of the Kingdom. It was during that stay D. Nuno that he received information that Leonor was ill. When he arrived in Porto she was already pronounced dead. She was buried in the Dominican nuns' Convento de Corpus Christi in the municipality of Vila Nova de Gaia.

== Marriages and offspring ==
She married Vasco Gonçalves Barroso in her first nuptial. She was widowed without any offspring. She later married Nuno Álvares Pereira on August 15, 1376, having three children;

- Beatriz Pereira de Alvim, the only of the three children to survive till adulthood. She married Afonso I, illegitimate son of King D. João I and Inês Pires, having three children.
