= Ayllón =

- Municipality
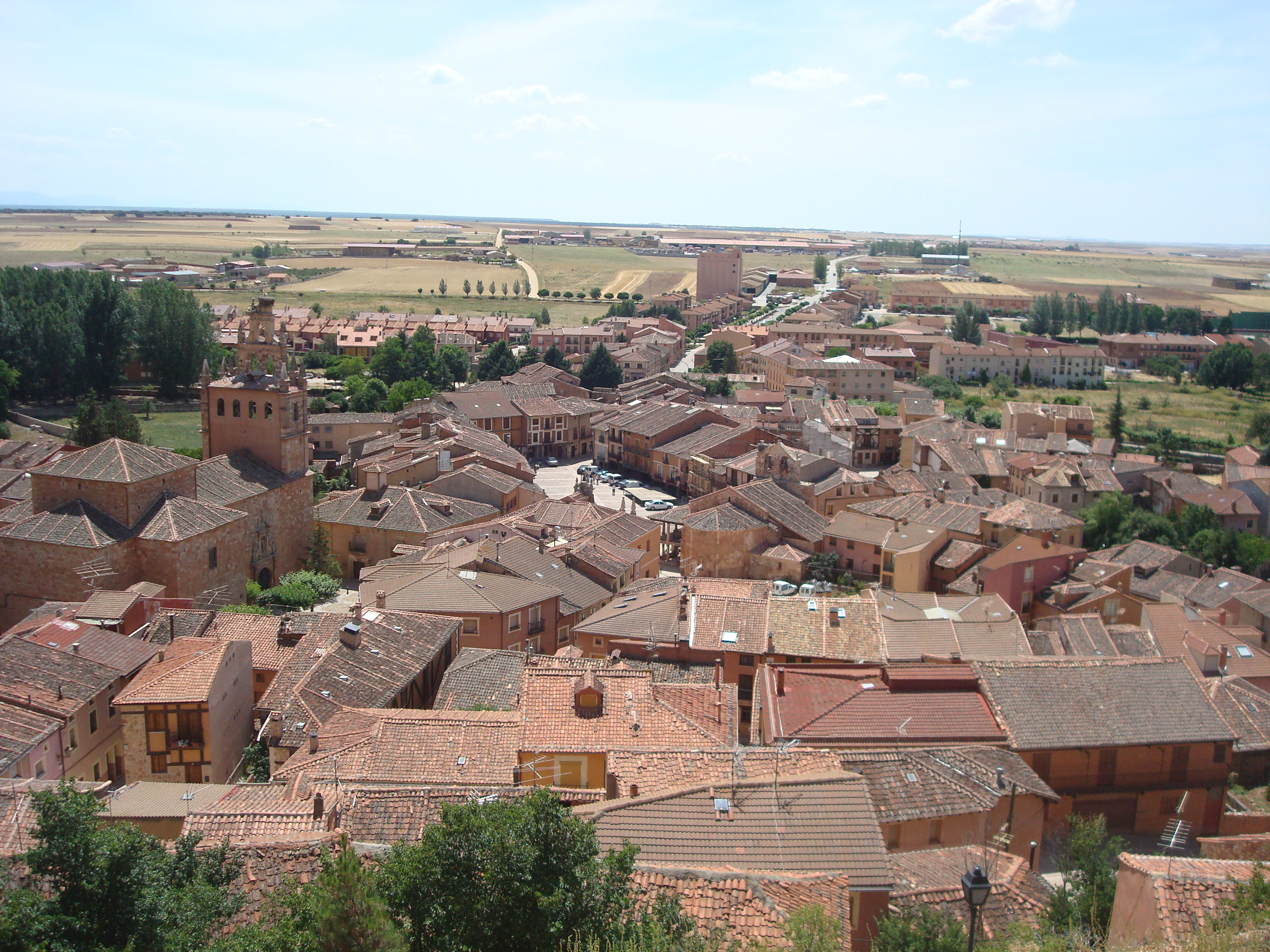

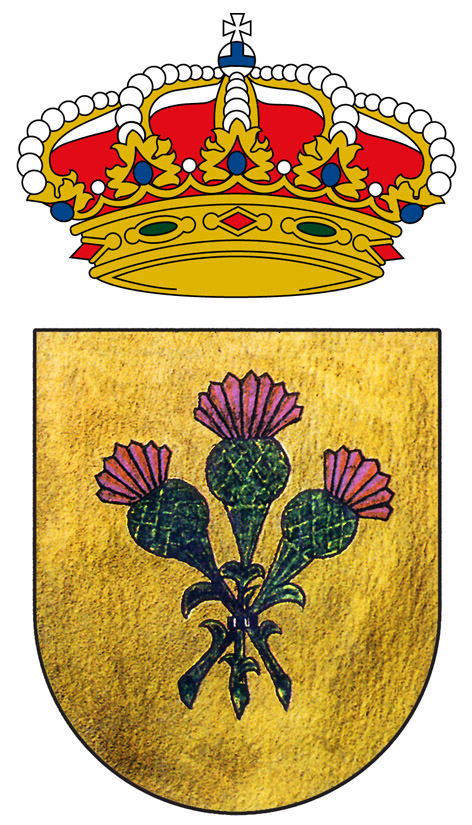
- Flag Coat of arms

- Location in Spain. Ayllón (Spain)
- Coordinates: 41°25′10″N 3°22′35″W
- Country: Spain
- Autonomous community: Castile and León
- Province: Segovia
- Municipality: Ayllón

Area
  - Total: 128.95 km^{2} (49.79 sq mi)
- Elevation: 1,019 m (3,343 ft)

Population (2025-01-01)
  - Total: 1,110
  - Density: 8.61/km^{2} (22.3/sq mi)
- Time zone: UTC+1 (CET)
  - Summer (DST): UTC+2 (CEST)
- Website: Official website

Ayllón (Spanish pronunciation: [ajˈʎon]) is a municipality located in the province of Segovia, Castile and León, Spain. According to the 2019 census (INE), the municipality had a population of 1,196 inhabitants.

In 1411 a treaty, known as the Treaty of Ayllón, was signed between Portugal and Castile ending the wars of the Interregnum.

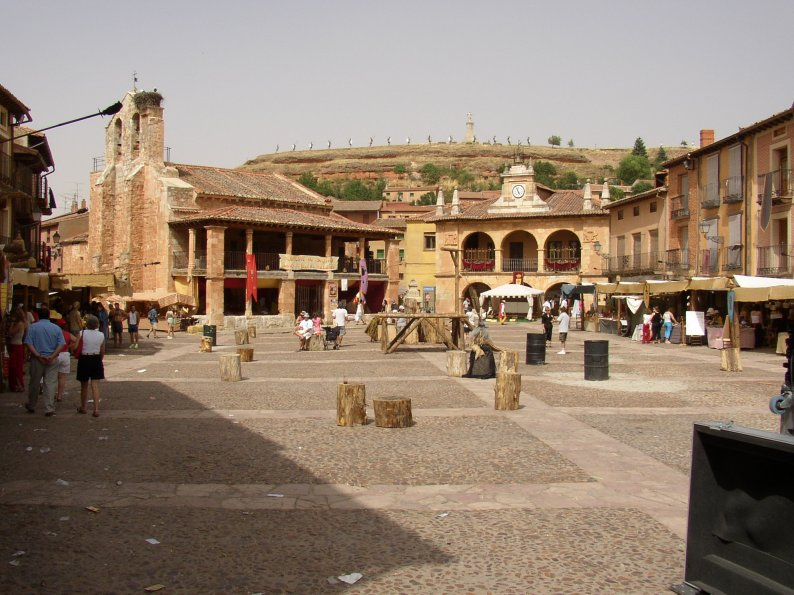
Plaza mayor with the medieval market.
