= Siege of Lisbon (1384) =

1384 military action in Portugal

- Part of 1383–1385 Crisis
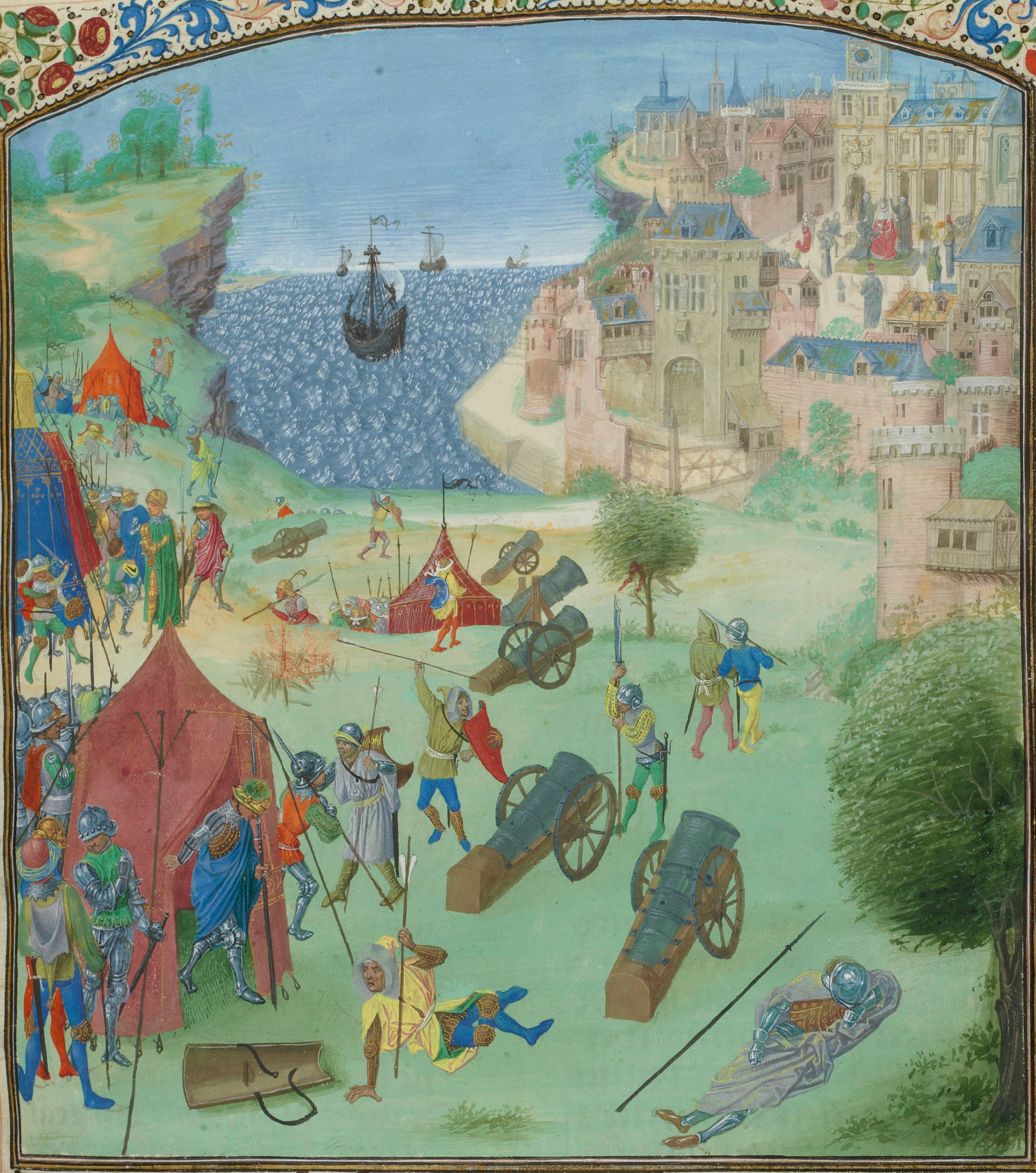
- The Siege of Lisbon in the Chronicles of Jean Froissart
Date	29 May – 3 September 1384
Location	Lisbon, Portugal
Result	Portuguese victory

Belligerents
Kingdom of Portugal	Crown of Castile

Commanders and leaders
John I of Portugal; Nuno Álvares Pereira	John I of Castile; Fernando Sanchez de Tovar # Pedro Fernández Cabeza de Vaca # Rodrigo González Mejía # Fernando Alfonso de Valencia # Ruíz de Sandoval # Pedro Rodriguez Sarmiento #

Strength
Unknown	5,000 spearmen 1,000 Jinetes; 6,000 crossbowmen "Countless" infantry soldiers

Casualties and losses
High	Very high

The siege of Lisbon was a siege of the city of Lisbon from 29 May to 3 September 1384. It was a part of the 1383-1385 Crisis, and occurred between the Portuguese defenders of the city led by John I of Portugal and the Castilian army led by King John I of Castile. The siege ended in a disaster for Castile. A plague outbreak together with the constant attacks by Portuguese forces led by Nuno Álvares Pereira caused huge casualties among the Castilian ranks, who were forced to retreat four months after the start of the siege.
