= Naval Battle of the Tejo =

1384 battle between Portuguese and Castilian naval fleets

Battle of Tejo
- Part of 1383–1385 Crisis
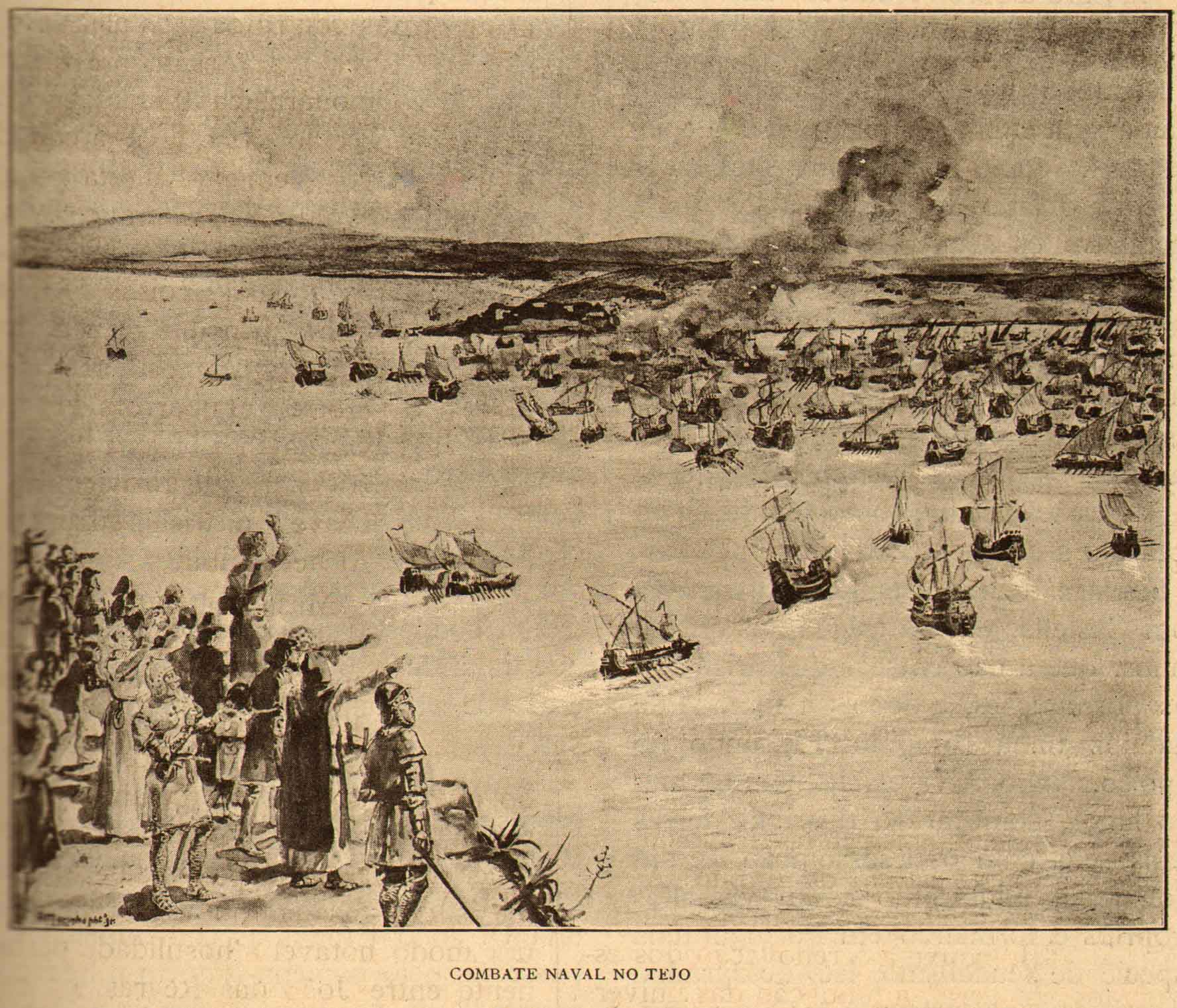
- Naval battle of the Tejo (illustration by Roque Gameiro, c. 1899)
Date	19 July 1384
Location	Tagus River, Lisbon, Portugal
Result	Portuguese victory

Belligerents
Kingdom of Portugal	Crown of Castile

Commanders and leaders
John of Aviz; Rui Pereira †; Count D. Gonçalo	Fernando Sanchez de Tovar

Strength
34 ships	53 ships

Casualties and losses
3 ships captured	Unknown

The Battle of Tejo took place in July 1384, in the Tagus river (Tejo in Portuguese), between a Portuguese naval force of 34 ships (5 of which were major vessels) with the objective of supplying the besieged city of Lisbon with much needed supplies and the Castilian fleet led by Sanchez de Tovar. Although the Portuguese lost three ships (Castilian casualties are unknown), Portuguese success in reaching Lisbon and breaking the blockade with much needed supplies was a major victory for Portugal. The Castilians would later retreat from the siege.

== See also ==
- History of Portugal
- John I of Portugal
- Kingdom of Portugal
- Treaty of Windsor (1386)
- João das Regras
- Hundred Years War
