= Valverde de Mérida =

Valverde de Mérida, Spain
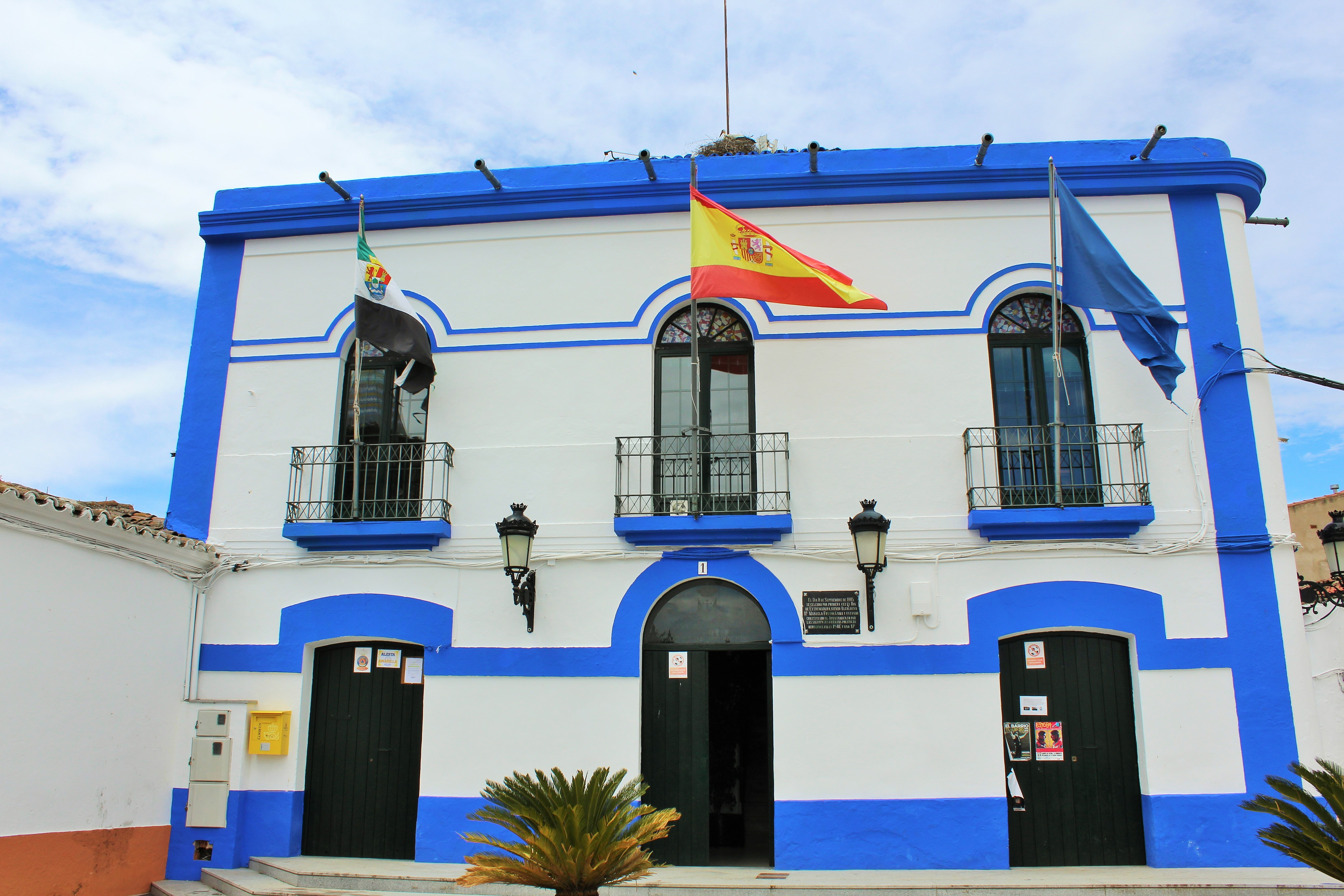
- Town hall

- Coat of arms

- Location of Valverde de Mérida, Spain
- Coordinates: 38°54′39″N 6°13′13″W
- Country: Spain
- Autonomous community: Extremadura
- Province: Badajoz
- Municipality: Valverde de Mérida

Government
  - Mayor: Silvia Vargas Frutos

Area
  - Total: 52.7 km^{2} (20.3 sq mi)
- Elevation: 267 m (876 ft)

Population (2025-01-01)
  - Total: 1,002
  - Density: 19.0/km^{2} (49.2/sq mi)
- Time zone: UTC+1 (CET)
  - Summer (DST): UTC+2 (CEST)
- Postal Code: 06890
- Website: valverdedemerida.es

Valverde de Mérida is a municipality located in the province of Badajoz, Extremadura, Spain. According to the 2005 census (INE), the municipality has a population of 1193 inhabitants.

== History ==
The Battle of Valverde (1385) was fought on 14 October 1385, near Valverde de Mérida, which saw the Kingdom of Portugal winning the battle against the Crown of Castile.

== See also ==
- List of municipalities in Badajoz
