= Battle of Trancoso =

1385 battle in Portugal

- Part of 1383–1385 Crisis
Date	29 May 1385
Location	Trancoso, Portugal
Result	Portuguese victory

Belligerents
Kingdom of Portugal	Crown of Castile

Commanders and leaders
Gonçalo Vasques Coutinho; Martim Vasques da Cunha; João Fernandes Pacheco	Juan Rodriguez de Castañeda

Strength
About 300 men	About 600 men

Casualties and losses
Unknown	400 dead 6 out of 7 captains killed

The Battle of Trancoso was fought on 29 May 1385 between the Kingdom of Portugal and the Crown of Castile.

Following the coronation of João of Aviz, John I of Castile sent an army into the Portuguese region of Beira in retaliation for Portuguese defiance, where they committed all the kinds of atrocities. The city of Viseu was pillaged and burned, but when the Castilians were returning to Castile with their plundered loot and the prisoners they had taken, a Portuguese army met them, dismounted and assumed a defensive formation. The Castilians exhausted themselves in attack but ended up being utterly routed, with very high casualties among their ranks, and with six of their seven captains killed. The Portuguese released all those taken captive by the Castilians and recovered all the pillage taken from their towns.

== See also ==
- History of Portugal
- House of Avis
- Nuno Álvares Pereira
- Hundred Years War
- Battle of Trancoso (1140)
