= Aljubarrota =

- Civil parish
- Location in Portugal
- Coordinates: 39.566°N 8.930°W
- Country: Portugal
- Region: Oeste e Vale do Tejo
- Intermunic. comm.: Oeste
- District: Leiria
- Municipality: Alcobaça

Area
  - Total: 47.94 km^{2} (18.51 sq mi)

Population (2011)
  - Total: 6,639
  - Density: 140/km^{2} (360/sq mi)
- Time zone: UTC+00:00 (WET)
  - Summer (DST): UTC+01:00 (WEST)

Aljubarrota (European Portuguese: [alʒuβɐˈʁotɐ]) is a freguesia ("civil parish") in the municipality of Alcobaça, Portugal. It was formed in 2013 by the merger of the parishes of Prazeres and São Vicente. Its population in 2011 was 6,639 in an area of 47.94 km². In 1385 the Battle of Aljubarrota took place near the village.

== Villages ==
- Aljubarrota
- Ataíja de Baixo
- Ataíja de Cima
- Boavista
- Cadoiço
- Carrascal
- Carvalhal
- Casais de Santa Teresa
- Casal da Eva
- Casal do Rei
- Chãos
- Chiqueda
- Covões
- Cumeira de Baixo
- Fonte do Ouro
- Ganilhos
- Lagoa do Cão
- Lameira
- Longras
- Mogo e Quinta do Mogo
- Moleanos
- Olheiros e Quinta de S. Paio
- Ponte de Jardim
- Quinta da Cruz
- Quinta Nova
- Riba Fria
- Val Vazão

== See also ==
- Battle of Aljubarrota
