= Battle of Atoleiros =

1384 battle in Portugal

- Part of 1383–1385 Crisis
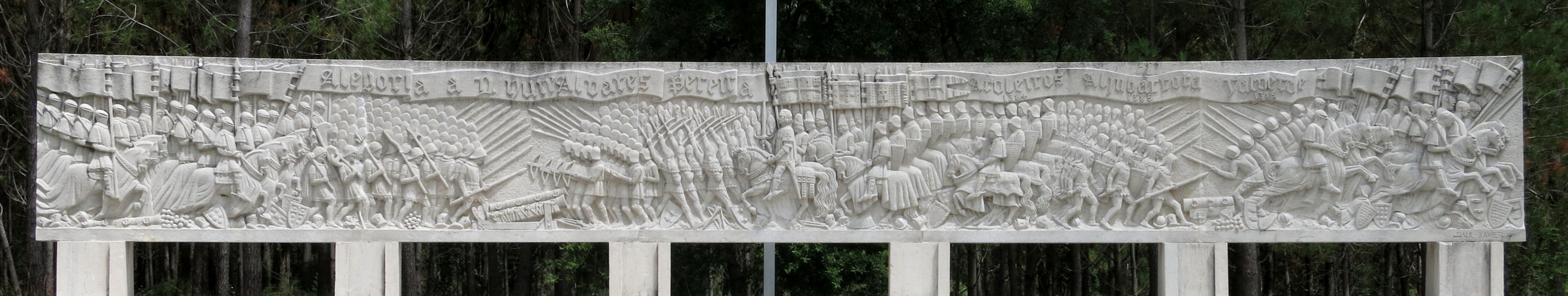
- Raul Xavier, Allegory to D. Nuno Álvares Pereira: Atoleiros, Aljubarrota, Valverde, 1959, S. Jorge (Leiria)
Date	6 April 1384
Location	Atoleiros, Alentejo, Portugal 39.021°N 7.626°W
Result	Portuguese victory

Belligerents
Kingdom of Portugal	Crown of Castile

Commanders and leaders
Nuno Álvares Pereira	Fernando Sanchez de Tovar; Pedro Álvares Pereira; Pero Gonzalez de Sevilla †; Martim Anes de Barundo

Strength
1,400 men: 1,000 foot soldiers; 300 cavalry; 100 crossbowman	5,000 men: 3,000 foot soldiers; 2,000 cavalry

Casualties and losses
No casualties	Heavy

The Battle of Atoleiros (Portuguese pronunciation: [ɐtuˈlɐjɾuʃ]) took place on 6 April 1384, between a Portuguese force and a punitive expedition from Castile sent by John I. The battle took place near the population centre of Fronteira in Alentejo. It was the first major battle of the 1383–1385 Crisis.

Nuno Álvares Pereira had been chosen to protect the frontier in this area, amid fear that a Castilian force could enter Portugal here. He left Lisbon with 1,000 infantry, adding to the strength of his forces on his way to Atoleiros. The Castilian army consisted of some 5,000 men, mostly cavalry, which was besieging the village of Fronteira. As Pereira approached, the Castilians sent an emissary to him, attempting to persuade him to retire. He refused, and the Castilians advanced to meet him, lifting the siege. The Portuguese formed a defensive square. In the short battle that followed, the Castilian cavalry was unable to break the Portuguese formation, suffering heavy losses. The Portuguese suffered none, and the Castilians withdrew.

The battle of Atoleiros represents the first effective use of “square tactics” on the battleground. This tactic, in which groups of infantry armed with both missile and hand-to-hand weapons defended themselves from all directions, was so successful that it was still in use over 500 years later during the Napoleonic Wars against mass French cavalry attacks, and during the Zulu War against huge masses of predominantly spear-armed infantry. It was especially effective when the infantry had to fight against strong cavalry.

== See also ==
- History of Portugal
- Treaty of Ayllón
- Interregnum
- Treaty of Windsor (1386)
- João das Regras
- Hundred Years War
- Philippa of Lancaster
