= Treaty of Ayllón =

1411 peace treaty between Castile and Portugal

The Treaty of Ayllón was a peace treaty that was signed in 1411 in Ayllón, Castile, between the Kingdom of Portugal and the Crown of Castile.

== Sources ==
- Newitt, M.D.D. (2005). A History of Portuguese Overseas Expansion, 1400-1668. Routledge. ISBN 0-415-23979-6.
