= Nuno Álvares Pereira =

Portuguese general (1360–1431)

Dom Nuno Álvares Pereira Count of Barcelos, Ourém, and Arraiolos
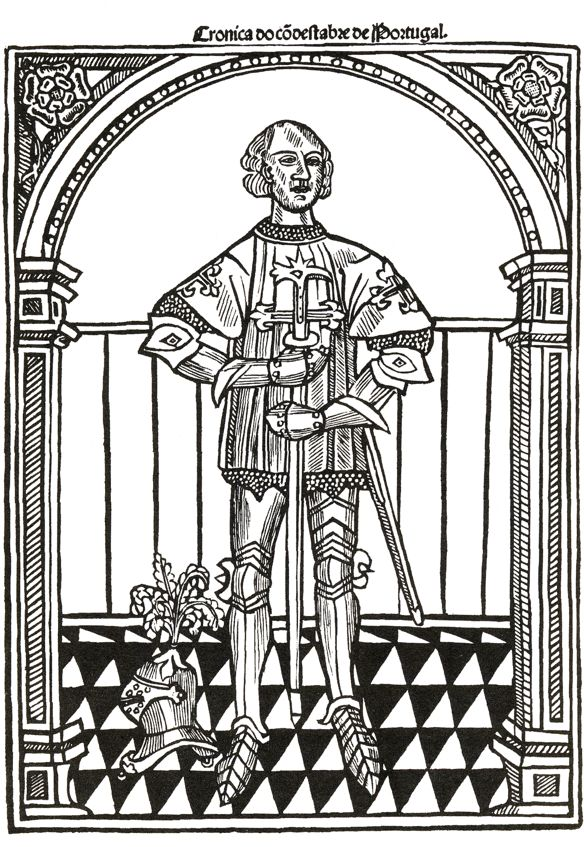
- Álvares Pereira in armor

Constable of Portugal
- In office 6 April 1385 – 1 November 1431
- Monarch: John I of Portugal
- Preceded by: Álvaro Pires de Castro
- Succeeded by: John of Portugal

Lord High Steward
- In office 6 April 1385 – 1 November 1431
- Monarch: John I of Portugal
- Preceded by: Garcia Rodrigues de Taborda
- Succeeded by: Diogo Lopes de Sousa

Personal details
- Born: 24 June 1360 Cernache de Bonjardim, Portugal
- Died: 1 November 1431 (aged 71) Convent of the Carmelites, Lisbon, Portugal
- Spouse: Leonor de Alvim (m. 1376; died 1388)
- Children: Beatriz Pereira de Alvim
- Parent(s): Álvaro Gonçalves Pereira (father); Iria Gonçalves do Carvalhal (mother)

Saint Nuno of Saint Mary OCarm
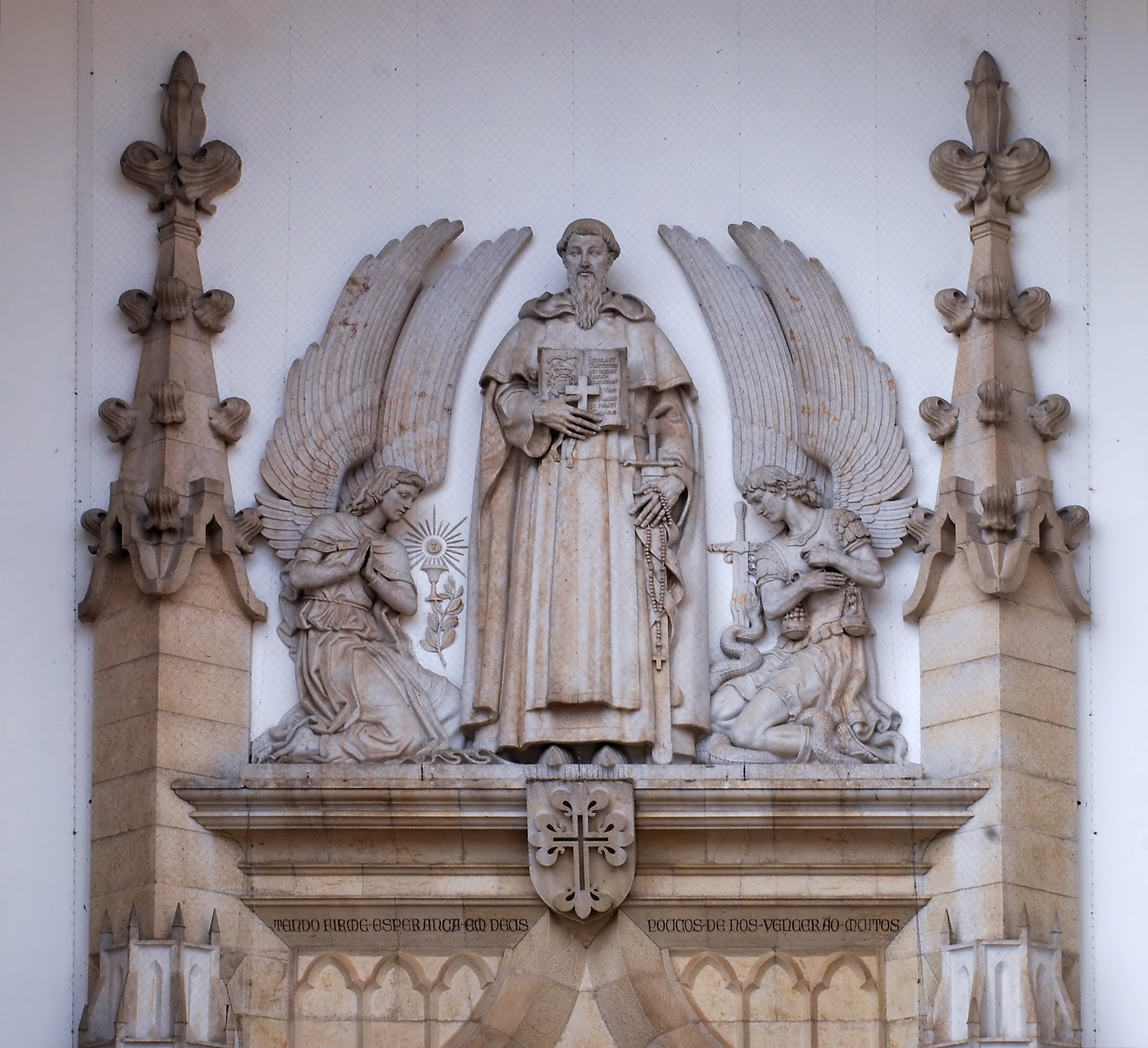
- Statue of Nuno Álvares Pereira atop the portal of Santo Condestável church, Lisbon
- Venerated in: Catholic Church
- Beatified: 23 January 1918, Vatican City by Pope Benedict XV
- Canonized: 26 April 2009, Vatican City by Pope Benedict XVI
- Major shrine: Church of Santa Engrácia
- Feast: 6 November
- Attributes: Knight, sword, fleur-de-lis, Carmelite habit

Dom Nuno Álvares Pereira, OCarm (European Portuguese pronunciation: [ˈnunu ˈalvɐɾɨʃ pɨˈɾɐjɾɐ]; 24 June 1360 – 1 November 1431) was a Portuguese general and Carmelite friar who played a decisive role in the 1383–1385 Crisis that assured Portugal's independence from Castile. He also served as Constable of Portugal. He later became a mystic and, after his death, was beatified by Pope Benedict XV in 1918 and canonised by Pope Benedict XVI in 2009.

Pereira is often referred to as the Saint Constable (Portuguese: Santo Condestável) or as Saint Nuno of Saint Mary (Portuguese: São Nuno de Santa Maria), his religious name. He was also count of Barcelos, Ourém and Arraiolos.

== Family ==
Nun'Álvares Pereira coat of arms

Nuno Álvares Pereira was born on 24 June 1360 in Cernache do Bonjardim, central Portugal, the illegitimate son of Dom Álvaro Gonçalves Pereira, prior of Crato and Iria Gonçalves do Carvalhal. His grandfather was Dom Gonçalo Pereira, the archbishop of Braga from 1326 until 1349. He was descended from the oldest Portuguese and Galician nobility.

About a year after his birth, the child was legitimised by royal decree and so he was able to receive a knightly education typical of the offspring of the noble families of the time.

At 13 years of age he became page to Queen Leonor. At age 16, he married Leonor de Alvim, a rich young widow. Three children were born to the union, two boys who died early in life, and a girl, Beatriz, who married Afonso, son of King John I and founder of the House of Aviz.

== Military life ==
Álvares Pereira began military service in 1373, when he was only 13, and helped stop an invasion from Castile. However, according to his own words, his first military campaigns were no more than skirmishes on the borders of Portugal. He was an impetuous and brave young man who soon showed himself to be an excellent leader.

When King Ferdinand I of Portugal died in 1383, his only heir was Beatrice, married to King John I of Castile. In order to preserve Portuguese independence, the nobles supported the claim of King Ferdinand's half-brother John, Master of Aviz to the throne. After his first victory over the Castilians, in the Battle of Atoleiros (April 1384), John of Aviz named Nuno Álvares Pereira protector and constable of Portugal, in practice supreme commander of Portugal's armies, and count of Ourém. He was only 24 years old.

Álvares Pereira used guerrilla tactics trying to dislodge the Castilian army besieging Lisbon in 1384 but plague finally drove them away.

In April 1385, John of Aviz was recognized as king by the Cortes. This triggered an invasion of the country by King John I of Castile in support of his wife's rights to the throne. Nuno Álvares Pereira was engaged against the northern cities loyal to the Castilians. During this time of war, he fed the hungry populations of his Castilian opposition at his own expense.

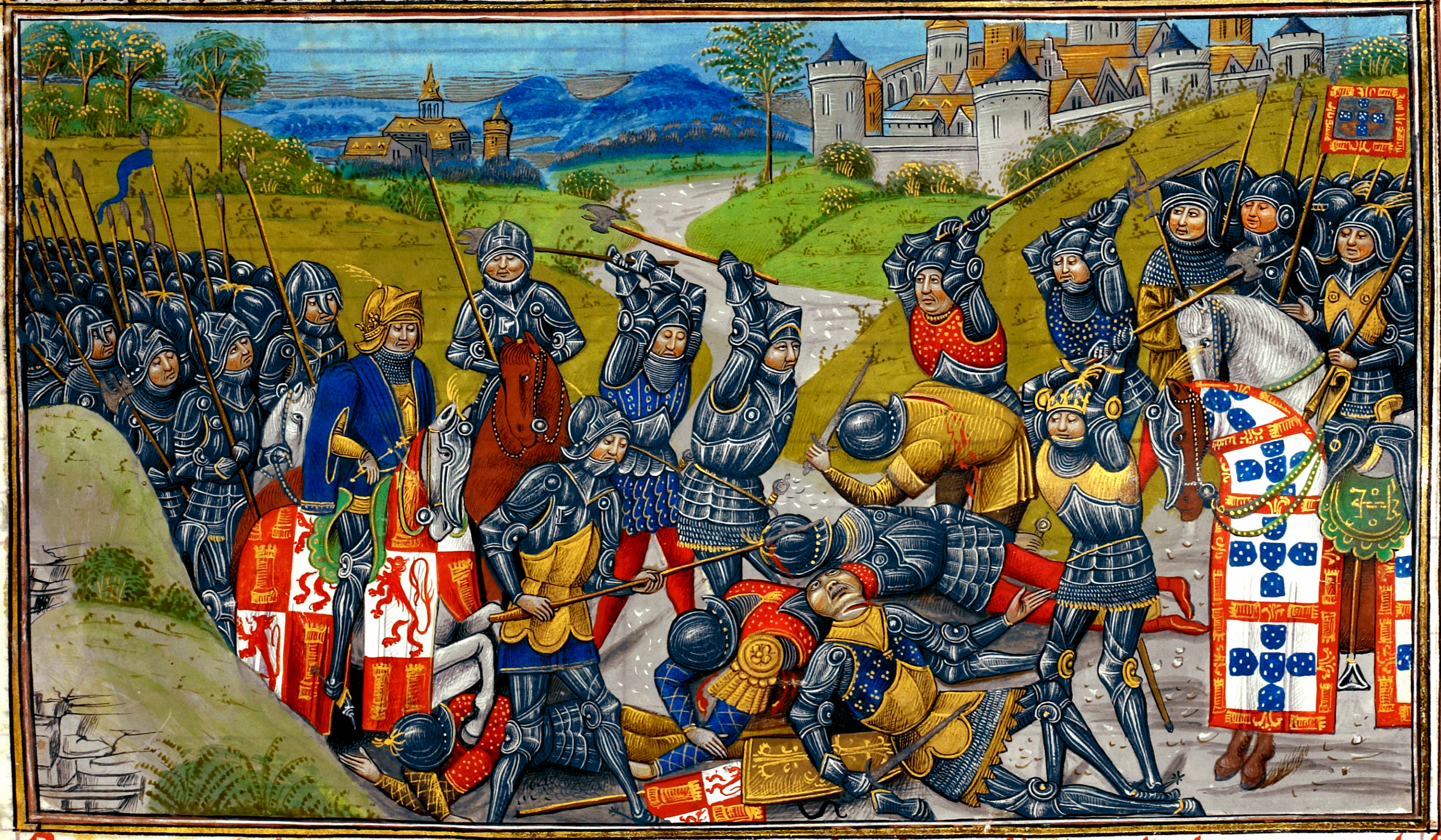
The Battle of Aljubarrota

On 14 August 1385, at Aljubarrota he led 6,500 volunteers to victory against a Castilian force of over 30,000, thus ending the threat of annexation. He attributed the victory to the Blessed Virgin, whose name, Maria, was inscribed on his sword. Dedicated to Mary, he fasted on Wednesdays, Fridays and Saturdays. The banner he chose as his personal standard bore the image of the cross, of Mary and of the saintly knights James and George. At his own expense he built numerous churches and monasteries, among which was the Carmelite church in Lisbon and the church of Our Lady of Victories at Batalha.

After the 1383-1385 Crisis, Álvares Pereira was made the count of Arraiolos and Barcelos, which, along with the previous title, were the only three countships existing at the time and which had been taken from nobles who had taken the part of Castile. He was also made the major majordomo of the realm.

Not wanting to give the enemy room to manoeuvre, the king of Portugal and his supreme general took the offensive and raided several Castilian towns, defeating once again a much larger Castilian army at the Battle of Valverde. He continued to watch out for the king of Castile until his death in 1390. When hostilities ended, he gave the bulk of his wealth to the veterans.

== Religious life ==
After the death of his wife, he became a Carmelite friar (he joined the Order in 1423) at the Carmo Convent which he had founded in fulfilment of a vow, and took the name of Friar Nuno of Saint Mary (Portuguese: Frei Nuno de Santa Maria). There he lived until his death on 1 November 1431. He was noted for his prayer, his practise of penance and his filial devotion to the Mother of God. Nuno suffered from debilitating arthritis.

During the last year of his life, King John I went to visit and embrace him for the last time. He wept for he considered Nuno Álvares Pereira his closest friend, the man who had put him on the throne and saved his country's independence.

Nuno Álvares Pereira's tomb was lost in the famous 1755 Lisbon earthquake. His epitaph read:

"Here lies that famous Nuno, the Constable, founder of the House of Bragança, excellent general, blessed monk, who during his life on earth so ardently desired the Kingdom of Heaven that after his death, he merited the eternal company of the Saints. His worldly honors were countless, but he turned his back on them. He was a great Prince, but he made himself a humble monk. He founded, built and endowed this church in which his body rests."

== Legacy ==
Statue of Nuno Álvares Pereira on horseback in Batalha

Álvares Pereira was beatified on 23 January 1918 by Pope Benedict XV. He was celebrated liturgically on 1 April as an obligatory memorial by the Order of Carmelites and as an optional memorial by the Order of Discalced Carmelites.

Álvares Pereira had been on the point of being canonised by decree in 1940 by Pope Pius XII. According to a recent statement by the postulator general of the Carmelite Order, his canonisation was postponed for diplomatic reasons (the Portuguese ambassador indicated that the time was not right).

On 3 July 2008 Pope Benedict XVI signed two decrees in Rome, promulgating the heroic virtues of Nuno Álvares Pereira and the authenticity of a miracle that had already been previously confirmed as such by medical and theological commissions. By this act, the pope formally canonised Friar Nuno de Santa Maria Álvares Pereira. The public celebration of his canonisation took place on 26 April 2009 in Saint Peter's Square in the Vatican City. The Carmelites now celebrate St Nuno on 6 November; the date also appointed for his feast in Portugal.

The Blessed Nuno Society is a mission society and prayer apostolate officially recognized by the Catholic Church as a diocesan Private Association of the Christian Faithful and affiliated with, the Catholic Diocese of Duluth, Minnesota.

== See also ==
- Saint Nuno Álvares Pereira, patron saint archive

Nuno Álvares Pereira Born: 24 June 1360 Died: 1 November 1431
Portuguese nobility
Preceded by João Afonso Telo	7th Count of Barcelos; 1385–1401	Succeeded by Afonso I, Duke of Braganza
Preceded by Juan Fernández Andeiro	3rd Count of Ourém; 1385–1422	Succeeded by Afonso, Marquis of Valença
Preceded by Álvaro Pires de Castro	2nd Count of Arraiolos; 1385–1422	Succeeded by Fernando I, Duke of Braganza
