= 1382 =

1382 in various calendars
- Gregorian calendar: 1382; MCCCLXXXII
- Ab urbe condita: 2135
- Armenian calendar: 831; ԹՎ ՊԼԱ
- Assyrian calendar: 6132
- Balinese saka calendar: 1303–1304
- Bengali calendar: 788–789
- Berber calendar: 2332
- English Regnal year: 5 Ric. 2 – 6 Ric. 2
- Buddhist calendar: 1926
- Burmese calendar: 744
- Byzantine calendar: 6890–6891
- Chinese calendar: 辛酉年 (Metal Rooster); 4079 or 3872 — to — 壬戌年 (Water Dog); 4080 or 3873
- Coptic calendar: 1098–1099
- Discordian calendar: 2548
- Ethiopian calendar: 1374–1375
- Hebrew calendar: 5142–5143
- Hindu calendars
- Vikram Samvat: 1438–1439
- Shaka Samvat: 1303–1304
- Kali Yuga: 4482–4483
- Holocene calendar: 11382
- Igbo calendar: 382–383
- Iranian calendar: 760–761
- Islamic calendar: 783–784
- Japanese calendar: Eitoku 2 (永徳２年)
- Javanese calendar: 1295–1296
- Julian calendar: 1382; MCCCLXXXII
- Korean calendar: 3715
- Minguo calendar: 530 before ROC 民前530年
- Nanakshahi calendar: −86
- Thai solar calendar: 1924–1925
- Tibetan calendar: ལྕགས་མོ་བྱ་ལོ་ (female Iron-Bird); 1508 or 1127 or 355 — to — ཆུ་ཕོ་ཁྱི་ལོ་ (male Water-Dog); 1509 or 1128 or 356

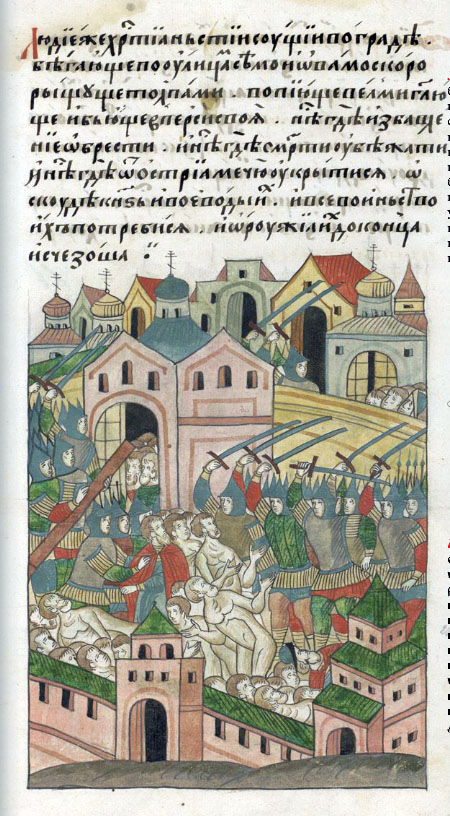
August 26: Tokhtamysh and his troops break into the walled city of Moscow and massacre the inhabitants.

Year 1382 (MCCCLXXXII) was a common year starting on Wednesday of the Julian calendar.

== Events ==
=== January–March ===
- January 6 – Basalawarmi, the Yuan dynasty Prince of Liang (now in the Henan province), commits suicide at his palace in Kaifeng after having been forced to retreat from the Ming dynasty armies.
- January 20 – Princess Anne of Bohemia, a daughter of the late Charles IV, Holy Roman Emperor, becomes the Queen Consort of England by marrying King Richard II; the marriage produces no heirs before her death in 1395.
- February 25 – The English Parliament adjourns after a session of almost four months that had started on 30-day session that began on November 3. Among the laws given royal assent by King Richard II are the Treason Act 1381, the Forcible Entry Act 1381 and the confirmations of the liberty of the church, prohibition of the exportation of gold or silver without permission, and setting of price ceilings on wine.
- March 3 – The Mailottins massacre takes place in Paris when revenue agents for King Charles VI arrive at the Les Halles market to collect taxes. The agents are killed by a mob of almost 500 merchants, and the number of people involved increases to several thousand, with the rioters seizing a large store of iron mallets (mallots) at the Place de Greve. Armed with heavy weapons, the mallotins begin attacking and looting churches, businesses, government offices and homes of wealthy people and then attack the Jewish section of city. An estimated 30 people are killed by the mob.
- March 5 – King Charles VI arrives at the gates of the walled city of Paris and, with the Duke of Burgundy as his intermediary, attempts to negotiate peace to end the rebellion in Paris. While their demands are not met, the mob opens the cells of the city's prisons and frees the persons incarcerated.
- March 10 – (24th day of Leap Month of Kōwa 2) Kusunoki Masanori, fighting for the Southern Court, is defeated in a battle at Kawachi Hirao with Yamana Ujiyoshi and is forced to retreat to Edo.
- March 29 – Troops commanded by the King of France and the Duke of Burgundy liberate Rouen from rebel control, without resistance, and all but 12 of the rebels are spared from execution.

=== April–June ===
- April 9 – Ming dyansty China, ruled by the Emperor Zhu Yuanzhang, completes the conquest of Yunnan the remaining portion of China still occupied by the Yuan dyansty in what is now the Yunnan province. General Fu Youde leads 250,000 Ming Chinese troops overwhelming the smaller Yunnan force of Mongol and Chinese Muslim troops.
- May 12 – Charles of Durazzo executes the imprisoned Joanna I of Naples, and succeeds her as Charles III of Naples.
- May 21 – John Wycliffe's teachings are condemned by the Synod of London, which becomes known as the "Earthquake Synod", after its meetings are disrupted by an earthquake.
- June 10 – Michele Morosini is elected as the new Doge of the Republic of Venice, five days after the death of Andrea Contarini, but serves for only four months before dying in office.

=== July–September ===
- July 19 – Joanna of Anjou, who had been Queen of Naples until being deposed on August 25, 1381, is murdered by strangulation after being transferred in May to the prison at the Castle of Muro Lucano.
- August 9 – King Richard II summons the English Parliament for the third time in the year, directing the Lords and members of Commons to assemble at Westminster on October 6.
- August 10 – The Treaty of Elvas is signed between King Fernando of Portugal and King Juan of Castile to end the Third Fernandine War. Under the agreement, Portugal ends its alliance with England and joins Castile and France in the Hundred Years' War, and recognizes the jurisdiction of the antipope Clement VII over the Portuguese church. Castile returns all Portuguese prisoners of war and ships, and gives Almeida and Miranda back to Portugal. Finally, King Fernando's daughter Beatriz marries King Juan's son Ferdinand.
- August 15 – Jogaila resumes his position as Grand Duke of Lithuania.
- August 23 – The Siege of Moscow begins as Tokhtamysh, khan of the Golden Horde attacks the capital of the Principality of Muscovy while its ruler, Prince Dmitry Donskoy, is away seeking assistance from other Russian princes.
- August 26 –
  - After three days, Tokhtamysh promises the highest ranking official in Moscow, Prince Ostei, that if a peaceful surrender can be negotiated, the Tatars of the Golden Horde will spare the population. As Ostei opens the gate of the walled city and walks out with his team, Tokhtamysh kills the Russian group and his troops begin looting, raping and killing the Moscow residents.
  - The iconic painting the Black Madonna of Częstochowa is brought from Jerusalem, to the Jasna Góra Monastery in Poland on her the day celebrated as the feast day in her honor.
- September 10 – Lajos I, King of Hungary and Croatia and Poland, dies at the age of 56 after 40 years as the Hungarian monarch.
- September 17 – Following the death of King Lajos, his daughter Mary is crowned the "King" of Hungary in a ceremony at Székesfehérvár, carried out by Cardinal Demeter, Archbishop of Esztergom.
- September 30 – The inhabitants of Trieste (now in northern Italy) donate their city to Duke Leopold III of Austria.

=== October–December ===
- October 13 – While being held as a prisoner in the Republic of Genoa, Jacques de Lusignan is elected by a parliament of Cypriot nobles to succeed his nephew, Peter II (who died on September 9), as King of Cyprus.
- October 16 – Michele Morosini, Doge of Venice, dies after contracting the bubonic plague. Antonio Venier is elected to succeed him. Vernier will be the chief executive of the republic for 18 years until his death in 1400.
- October 20 – Winchester College is founded in England.
- November 25 – The nobles of Greater Poland assemble at Radomsko and, not wishing to be ruled by Mary' of Hungarys fiancee, the future Sigismund of Luxembourg, choose Mary's younger sister, Jadwiga, to become ruler of Poland.
- November 27 –
  - After a five-year revolt, Barquq deposes Hajji II as Mamluk Sultan of Egypt, marking the end of the Bahri Dynasty and Qalawunid Dynasty, and the start of the Burji Dynasty.
  - Battle of Roosebeke: A French army under Louis II, Count of Flanders defeats the Flemings, led by Philip van Artevelde.
- December 12 – The noblemen of Lesser Poland meet at Wiślica and, as with the November 25 decision of the nobles of Greater Poland, vote to invite Jadwiga of Hungary to be their ruler.

=== Date unknown ===
- Khan Tokhtamysh of the Golden Horde overruns Muscovy, as punishment for Grand Prince Dmitry Donskoy's resistance to Khan Mamai of the Blue Horde in the 1370s. Dmitry Donskoy pledges his loyalty to Tokhtamysh, and is allowed to remain as ruler of Moscow and Vladimir.
- The Ottomans take Sofia from the Bulgarians.
- Ibrahim I is selected to succeed Husheng, as Shah of Shirvan (now Azerbaijan).
- Kęstutis, the Grand Duke of Lithuania, is taken prisoner by former Grand Duke Jogaila, whilst meeting him to hold negotiations. Kęstutis is subsequently murdered, and Jogaila regains the rule of Lithuania.
- Ahmed deposes his brother, Hussain, as ruler of the Jalayirid Dynasty in western Persia.
- Rana Lakha succeeds Rana Kshetra Singh, as ruler of Mewar (now part of western India).
- Conrad Zöllner von Rothenstein succeeds Winrich von Kniprode, as Grand Master of the Teutonic Knights.
- Balša II of Zeta conquers Albania.
- Dawit I succeeds his brother Newaya Maryam, as Emperor of Ethiopia.
- Abraham bar Garib becomes Syriac Orthodox Patriarch of Mardin.

== Births ==
- January 23 – Richard Beauchamp, 13th Earl of Warwick (d. 1439)
- date unknown
  - Frederick IV, Duke of Austria (d. 1439)
  - Joan, princess regent of Navarre (d. 1413)
  - Lope de Barrientos, powerful bishop in Castile
  - Dawit I of Ethiopia (d. 1413)
- probable – Erik of Pomerania, King of Norway, Sweden and Denmark (d. 1459)

== Deaths ==
- January 5 – Philippa Plantagenet, Countess of Ulster (b. 1355)
- February 8 – Blanche of France, Duchess of Orléans (b. 1328)
- February 15 – William de Ufford, 2nd Earl of Suffolk (b. c. 1339)
- April 5 – Janusz Suchywilk, Polish nobleman
- May 12 – Queen Joanna I of Naples (b. 1327) (murdered)
- July 11 – Nicole Oresme, French philosopher (b. 1325)
- August 3 or August 15 – Kęstutis, Grand Duke of Lithuania (b. 1297)
- August 13 – Eleanor of Aragon, queen of John I of Castile (b. 1358)
- September 10 – King Louis I of Hungary (b. 1326)
- September 29 – 'Izz al-Din ibn Rukn al-Din Mahmud, malik of Sistan
- October 13 – King Peter II of Cyprus
- October 18 – James Butler, 2nd Earl of Ormond (b. 1331)
- November 27 – Philip van Artevelde, Flemish patriot (b. 1340) (killed in battle)
- Louis Fadrique, Count of Salona

date unknown – Newaya Maryam, Emperor of Ethiopia
