= João Afonso Telo, 6th Count of Barcelos =

Mayor of Lisbon, Admiral of Portugal, 6th Count of Barcelos

João Afonso Telo, (died on 14 August 1385 in the Battle of Aljubarrota), mayor of Lisbon in 1372, admiral of Portugal from 1375 – 1376, and sixth Count of Barcelos, was a member of the highest ranks of the nobility, member of the Téllez de Meneses lineage as a descendant of Tello Pérez de Meneses.

== Family relations ==
He was the son of Martim Afonso Telo de Meneses — mayordomo mayor of Maria of Portugal, queen consort as the wife of King Alfonso XI of Castile — who was killed in 1356 following the orders of King Peter of Castile. His mother was Aldonça Anes de Vasconcelos, daughter of João Mendes de Vasconcelos, Alcalde of Estremoz, and Aldara Alfonso Alcoforado. He had one brother, Gonçalo Teles de Meneses, Count of Neiva and Lord of Faria, and two sisters, Maria Teles, murdered by her second husband, John, and Leonor Teles, queen consort by her marriage with King Ferdinand I of Portugal. He also had a half-sister, Joana Teles de Meneses, the wife of Juan Alfonso Pimentel, Count of Benavente.

== Life ==
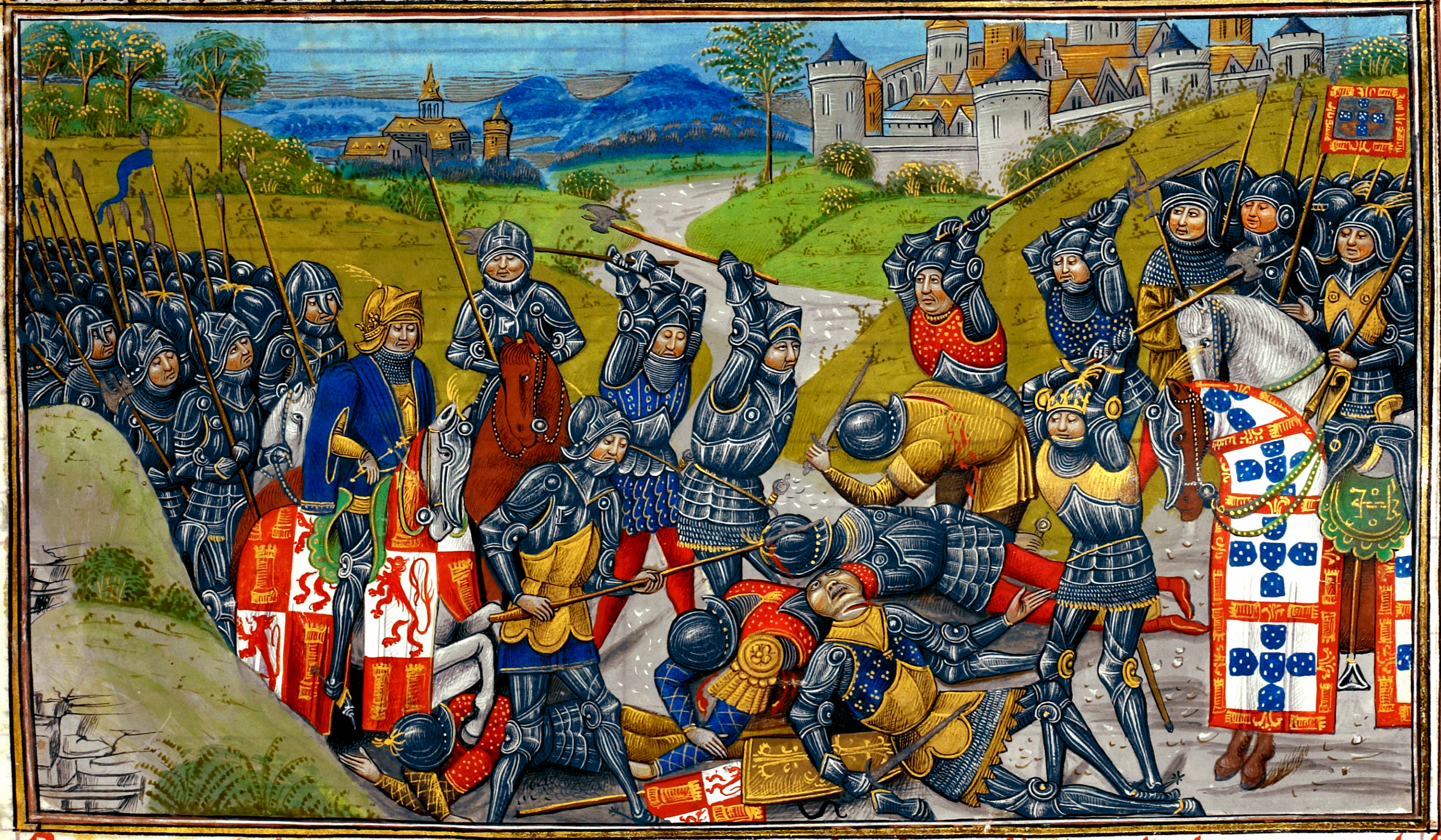
Illustration of the Battle of Aljubarrota by Jean de Wavrin (Chronique d'Angleterre)

During the third Fernandine War João Afonso Telo commanded the Portuguese fleet in the Battle of Saltes Island fought between the Crown of Castille, under the command of Fernando Sánchez de Tovar, and the Kingdom of Portugal. The result of the battle was the destruction of the naval offensive capability of Portugal, achieving the Castilian naval supremacy in the Atlantic Ocean. Portuguese chronicler, Fernão Lopes in his Chronica de el-rei D. Fernando blamed the defeat on the arrogance and haughtiness of the Count of Barcelos.

He participated in the assassination of Count Juan Fernández de Andeiro, alleged lover of Queen Leonor, and was present on 6 December 1383 when the master of the Order of Aviz, the future John I of Portugal, entered the queen's chambers to kill Fernández Andeiro. He switched loyalties later and supported the Castilian King, Juan I who made him Count of Mayorga, as the pretender to the Portuguese throne.

He married Beatriz Alfonso de Alburquerque, an illegitimate daughter of João Afonso de Albuquerque, the tutor and chancellor of King Peter of Castile, and of his mistress María Rodríguez Barba. His wife's sister married to João Afonso's brother, Gonçalo Teles. Even though he had issue with Beatriz, he had no grandchildren.

João Afonso died in Aljubarrota and was the only enemy killed in this battle who was buried by the order of the Portuguese king.

== See also ==
- Battle of Saltes Island
- Fernandine Wars

== Bibliography ==
- Braamcamp Freire, Anselmo (1921). Livro primeiro dos Brasões de Sintra (in Portuguese). Coimbra: Imprensa da Universidade. OCLC 794223590.
- Fernández Duro, Cesáreo (1995). La Marina de Castilla (in Spanish). Madrid: Editmex. ISBN 9788486228040.
- Garcia de Pina, Isabel M. (2008). Leonor Teles, uma mulher de poder? (PDF) (in Portuguese). Universidade de Lisboa, Faculdade de Letras, Departamento de História.
- Lopes, Fernão (1896). Chronica de el-rei D. Fernando (in Portuguese). Vol. III. Lisbon: Escriptorio. Serie: Bibliotheca de classicos portugueses (VI). OCLC 2634915.
- Lopes, Fernão (1644). Chronica de el-rei D. Joam I de boa memoria (in Portuguese). Lisbon: António Álvarez Impressor del Rey.
- López de Ayala, Pedro (1780). Crónica de los Reyes de Castilla, Don Pedro, Don Enrique II, Don Juan I, Don Enrique III (in Spanish). Madrid: Imprenta de D. Antonio de Sancha. OCLC 2921347.
- Sotto Mayor Pizarro, José Augusto P. (1987). Os Patronos do Mosteiro de Grijo: Evolução e Estrutura da Familia Nobre Séculos XI a XIV (in Portuguese). Oporto.
