= Castilian attack on Gravesend =

- Part of Hundred Years' War
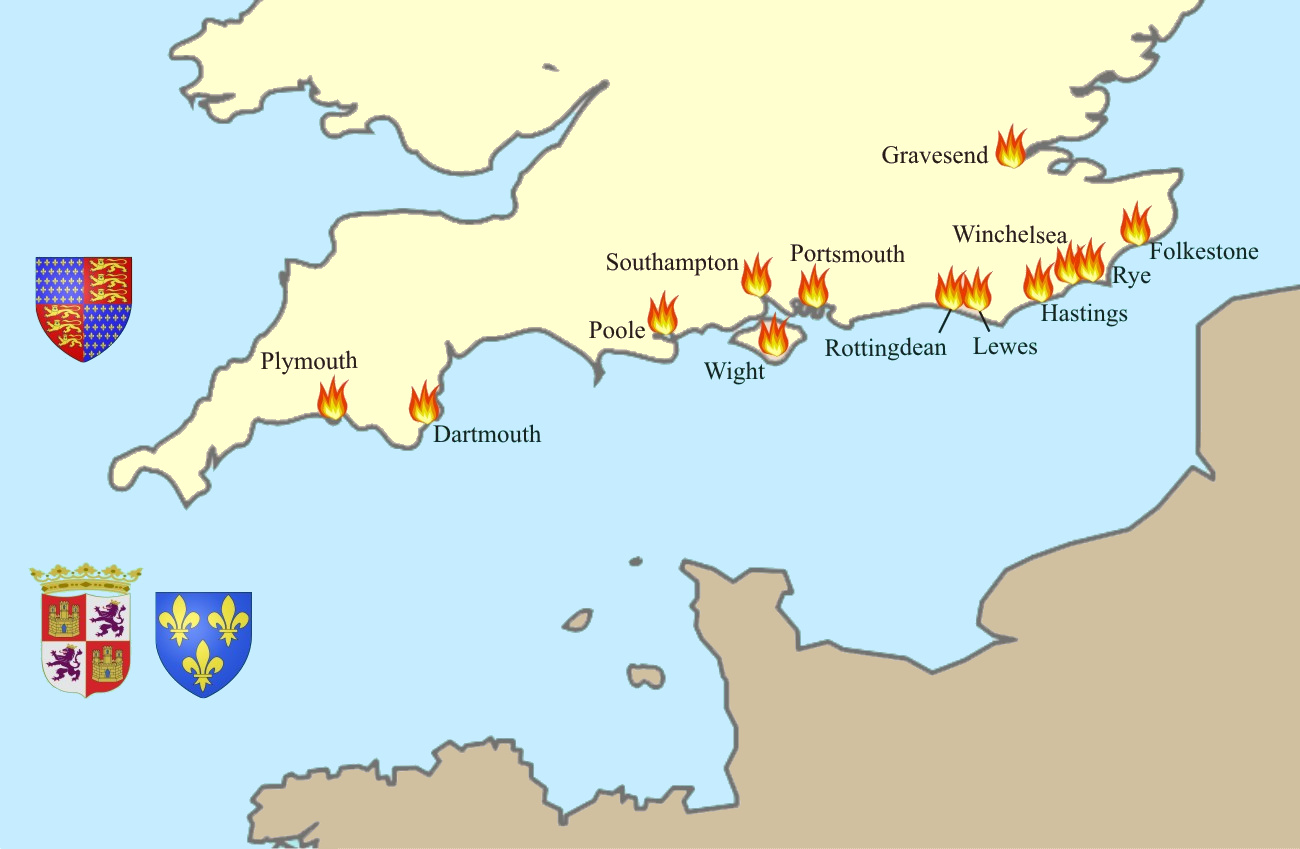
- Other raids on the south English coastline that occurred during the Hundred Years' War
Date	Summer of 1380
Location	Gravesend
Result	Castilian victory

Belligerents
Crown of Castile	Kingdom of England

Units involved
20 galleys	Unknown

The forces of Juan I of Castile attacked Gravesend in the summer of 1380. During the raid on the town, the Castilian admiral Fernando Sánchez de Tovar ordered soldiers to loot the town and set it ablaze. The attacks were part of the Hundred Years' War, and led to concerns for the safety of London, just 20 miles away.

== Context ==
Henry II of Castile was crowned king of Castile after defeating his half-brother in the first Castilian civil war. The new Trastámara king joined with the French under Jean de Vienne in a series of naval attacks and incursions into England. During these attacks, the towns of Dartmouth, Folkestone, Hastings, Lewes, Plymouth, Poole, Portsmouth, Rottingdean, Rye, Southampton, Wight, and Winchelsea were looted, and many were burned. In 1379, Henry II died and left his throne to his son, Juan I of Castile, who soon ordered a naval raid in 1379 against the Kingdom of England.

== Sequence of events ==
The raiding fleet, a combined Spanish-French fleet of 20 galleys under the command of Fernando Sánchez de Tovar, which previously departed from Seville in late 1379/early 1380, arrived in the Thames Estuary in early summer of 1380. Before it moved to attack the eastern English seaboard, the islands of Jersey and Guernsey were also subject to raids by the fleet.

The fleet attacked Winchelsea and towns in Kent, before entering the mouth of the River Thames and attacking Gravesend, with some sources even claiming that the fleet advanced to within sight of the English capital of London. At Gravesend, Castilian soldiers disembarked and proceeded to loot the town and set it ablaze.
