= Treaty of Elvas =

1382 treaty which ended the Portuguese-Castilian War

The Treaty of Elvas (Portuguese: tratado de Elvas) was a peace treaty between the Kingdom of Portugal and Crown of Castile, which ended the Portuguese-Castilian War of 1381-1382. It was signed by King Fernando I of Portugal and King John I of Castile on 10 August 1382 in the Portuguese city of Elvas after the Portuguese defeat. The terms of the treaty were as follows:

- Portugal and Castile end the war and restore good neighborly relations; Portugal breaks its alliance with the Kingdom of England and joins the Franco-Castilian alliance in the Hundred Years' War.
- Portugal recognizes Avignon antipope Clement VII as the legitimate pope and joins the Franco-Castilian side in the Western Schism.
- To strengthen the alliance, the Portuguese Infanta Beatrice, the only daughter of King Fernando I and heiress to the Portuguese throne, marries the Castilian prince Ferdinand, a son of King John I.
- Castile returns to Portugal the cities of Almeida and Miranda, as well as all captured ships and captives.

The treaty was negotiated by the Portuguese queen Leonor Teles, Count of Ourém, the Galician Juan de Andeiro, Bishop of Lisbon, the Castilian Martinho de Zamora, Bishop of Coimbra, the Castilian Juan Cabeza de Vaca, Bishop of Guarda, the Portuguese Afonso Correa, lawyer João das Regras and others. Pedro de Luna (future antipope Benedict XIII), an envoy of Avignon antipope Clement VII, served as mediator between the Portuguese and Castilian parties.

The Treaty of Elvas was a separate peace treaty concluded behind the backs of Portugal's English allies. It removed Portugal from the Hundred Years' War for a time. As a chronicler recalls, learning of the betrayal of the Portuguese, the English knights angrily put down their helmets and smashed them with axes. On 1 September 1382 Edmund, earl of Cambridge, took his ships and left Lisbon with his army.

On 2 April 1383 the Treaty was supplemented and clarified in the Treaty of Salvaterra, according to which Beatrice had to marry John I of Castile.

== Sources ==
- Livermore H.V. History of Portugal. Cambridge: University Press, 1947.
- Livermore H.V. A New History of Portugal. Cambridge University Press, 1969.
- Costa Gomes, Rita. The making of a court society: kings and nobles in late medieval Portugal. Cambridge University Press, 2003.
- Menéndez Pidal, Ramón. Jover Zamora, José María. Historia de España. Espasa-Calpe, 2007. V. 14. p. 229.
- Suárez Fernández, Luis. Historia del reinado de Juan I de Castilla: Estudio. Universidad Autónoma, 1977. p. 114.
