= Battle of Saltés Island =

Naval battle

Coordinates: 37°15′N 6°57′W

- Part of the Third Fernandine War
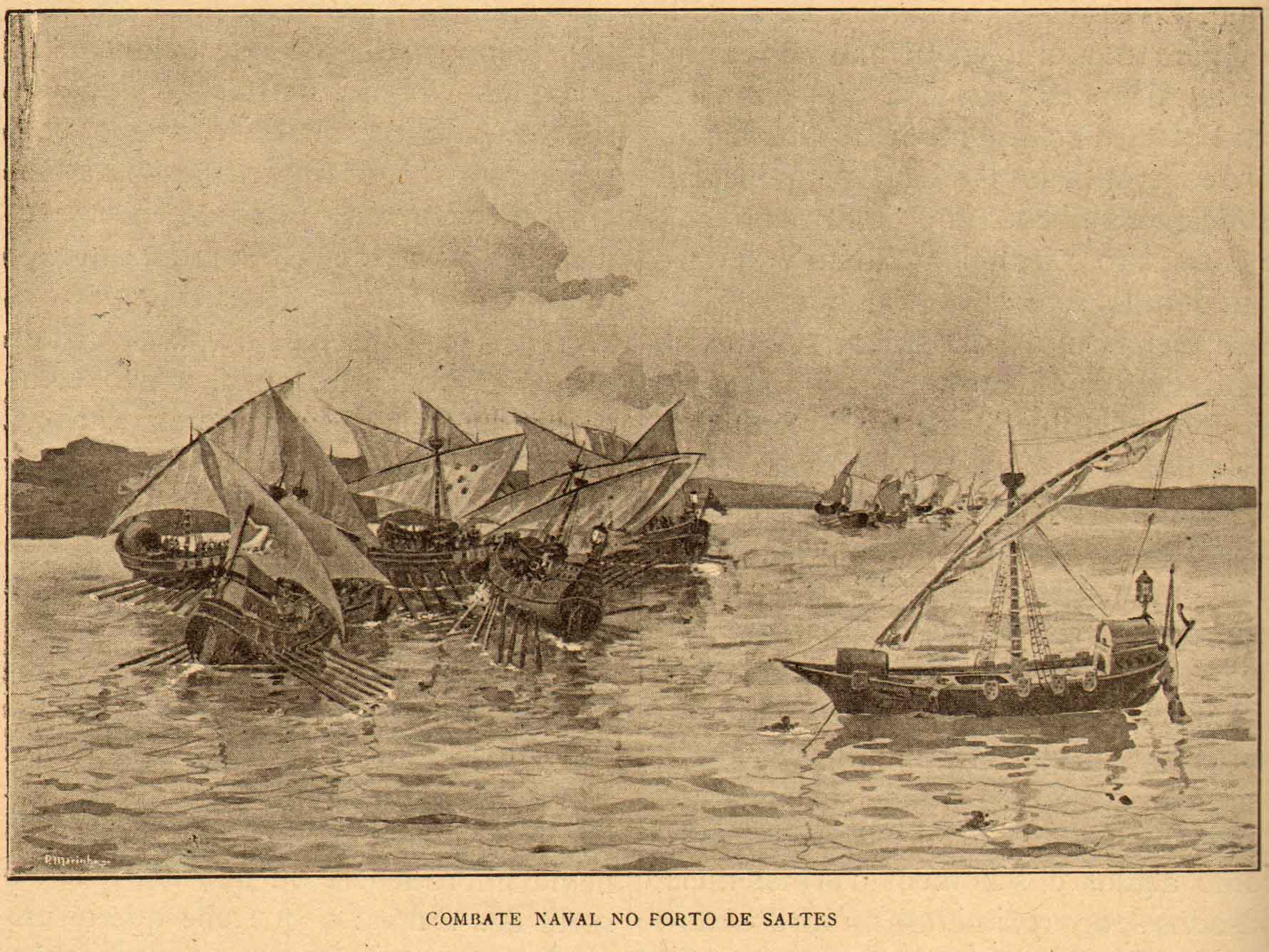
- Illustration by Alfredo Roque Gameiro
Date	17 July 1381
Location	Off Saltés Island, near Huelva, present day Spain
Result	Castilian victory

Belligerents
Kingdom of Portugal	Crown of Castile

Commanders and leaders
João Afonso Telo	Fernando Sánchez de Tovar

Strength
23 galleys	17 galleys

Casualties and losses
22 galleys and their crews captured	Minimum

The naval Battle of Saltés Island or Battle of Saltés (Spanish: Batalla de la Isla Saltés) took place on 17 July 1381, off Saltés Island, between the Crown of Castile and the Kingdom of Portugal during the Third Ferdinand War. The Castilian fleet commanded by Don Fernando Sánchez de Tovar defeated decisively the Portuguese fleet led by João Afonso Telo. The result of the battle was the destruction of the naval offensive capability of Portugal, achieving the Castilian naval supremacy in the Atlantic Ocean.

== Background ==
Following the death of Peter I of Castile, Ferdinand I of Portugal declared war on the Kingdom of Castile for possession of the Castilian throne. This series of conflicts were known as the Ferdinand Wars. In 1381, breaking the Treaty of Santarem (1373) which brought peace to the second war, Ferdinand I retaliated against Castile, thus initiating the Third Ferdinand War. For this, he signed an alliance with the young Richard II of England. John of Gaunt, Duke of Lancaster, also had claims to the Castilian throne since 1371 and seeing in this deal a means of enforcement of his cause, sent about 2,000 English soldiers under the command of the Earl of Cambridge to Lisbon to support a Portuguese incursion into the Castilian territory.

To prevent the English contingent being intercepted at sea by the navy of Castile, the Portuguese monarch planned a naval blockade. In mid-July 1381, a Portuguese fleet under the command of João Afonso Teles de Menezes, 6th Count of Barcelos, sailed from Lisbon towards the mouth of the Guadalquivir river to prevent the passage of the Castilian fleet, which was anchored in Seville. At the same time, the fleet of Admiral Fernando Sánchez de Tovar sailed from its base in Seville, heading out to the Portuguese coasts. On 17 July, sailing in opposite directions, the two fleets sighted each other off the Algarve.

== Battle of the Saltés Island ==
After assessing the situation, Castilian Admiral Fernando Sánchez de Tovar considered victory very unlikely under the circumstances and ordered the fleet to tack and return to port. His Portuguese counterpart saw an opportunity to beat the rival, and began pursuit of the Castilian fleet. De Tovar ordered to his men to row at a fast pace, forcing his Portuguese pursuers to match the effort to try to overcome the fleet. The different speeds at which they advanced increased the distance between the Portuguese ships, breaking their formation.

After about two hours, exhaustion, thirst and the heat of summer took their toll on the Portuguese rowers, and many of their ships were left behind. Eight of them, the vanguard of the Portuguese fleet, attacked the small island of Saltés and destroyed the property of the fishermen in the vicinity. Seeing that the Portuguese had fallen into his trap, de Tovar launched his ships against the enemy in compact formation, and easily captured the Portuguese galleys. The rest of the Portuguese fleet approached in disarray one by one and were captured by the Castilians without difficulty. Eventually, only one of the 23 Portuguese galleys avoided capture.

== Aftermath ==
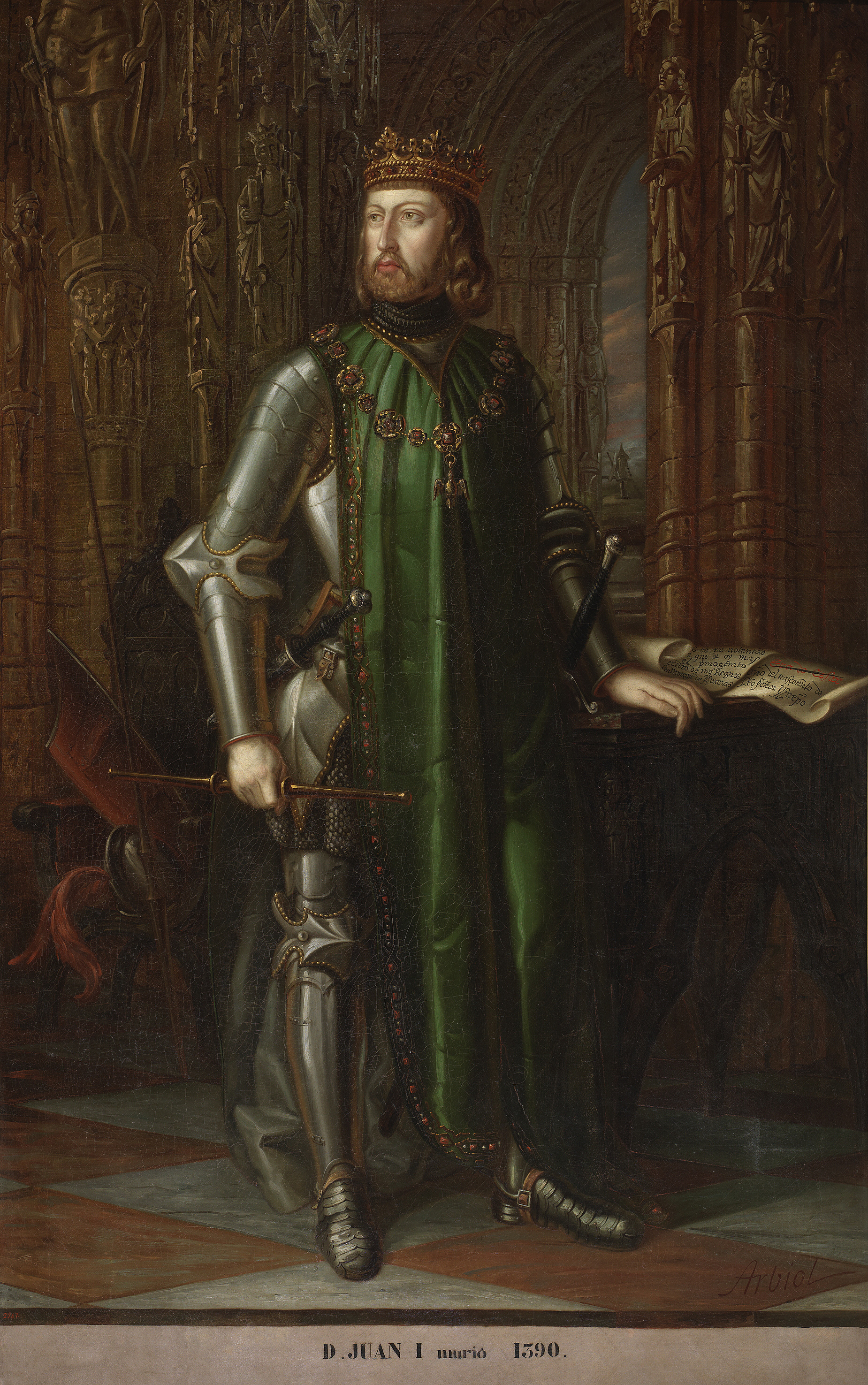
King John I of Castile.

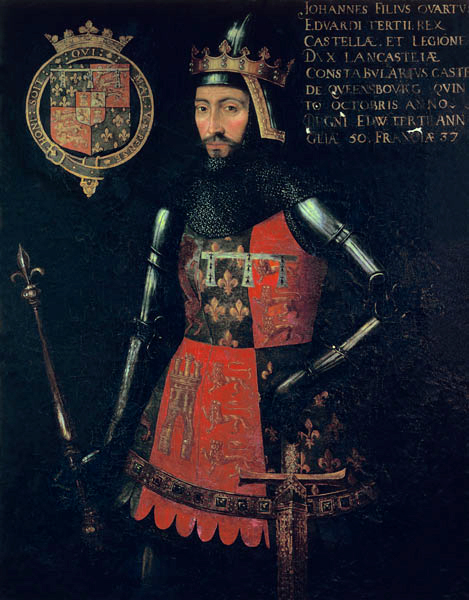
John of Gaunt, Duke of Lancaster.

Admiral Fernando Sánchez de Tovar entered triumphantly with his 22 galleys captured in the port of Seville, with great joy of its inhabitants. This fact allowed the English to dock in Lisbon without problems. Later, the English men of the Duke of Lancaster, arranged their boats to face off against the fleet of Sánchez de Tovar, but knowing that he had returned to Seville, the English ships returned to England, leaving in Lisbon to the English land forces.

The resounding victory of Don Fernando Sánchez de Tovar had obvious implications for the Third Ferdinand War. Annulled the naval offensive capability of Portugal, achieving the Castilian naval supremacy in the Atlantic Ocean. That year, the Portuguese could not build more fleets against Castile, who, in turn, did not need to do the same, and the Castilians exercised an effective control of the sea. Therefore, the battle ended the naval Portuguese campaign of 1381.

The effects of the Portuguese defeat also felt in the following year, when the Kingdom of Portugal had to face, militarily weaker than usual, a vigorous attack by sea and land from the Crown of Castile. The Castilians came to the gates of Lisbon, forcing the King of Portugal to sign peace in August with John I of Castile, by the Treaty of Elvas.

== See also ==
- List of Castilian monarchs
- List of Portuguese monarchs
- List of English monarchs
