= 1381 =

1381 in various calendars
- Gregorian calendar: 1381; MCCCLXXXI
- Ab urbe condita: 2134
- Armenian calendar: 830; ԹՎ ՊԼ
- Assyrian calendar: 6131
- Balinese saka calendar: 1302–1303
- Bengali calendar: 787–788
- Berber calendar: 2331
- English Regnal year: 4 Ric. 2 – 5 Ric. 2
- Buddhist calendar: 1925
- Burmese calendar: 743
- Byzantine calendar: 6889–6890
- Chinese calendar: 庚申年 (Metal Monkey); 4078 or 3871 — to — 辛酉年 (Metal Rooster); 4079 or 3872
- Coptic calendar: 1097–1098
- Discordian calendar: 2547
- Ethiopian calendar: 1373–1374
- Hebrew calendar: 5141–5142
- Hindu calendars
- Vikram Samvat: 1437–1438
- Shaka Samvat: 1302–1303
- Kali Yuga: 4481–4482
- Holocene calendar: 11381
- Igbo calendar: 381–382
- Iranian calendar: 759–760
- Islamic calendar: 782–783
- Japanese calendar: Kōryaku 3 / Eitoku 1 (永徳元年)
- Javanese calendar: 1294–1295
- Julian calendar: 1381; MCCCLXXXI
- Korean calendar: 3714
- Minguo calendar: 531 before ROC 民前531年
- Nanakshahi calendar: −87
- Thai solar calendar: 1923–1924
- Tibetan calendar: ལྕགས་ཕོ་སྤྲེ་ལོ་ (male Iron-Monkey); 1507 or 1126 or 354 — to — ལྕགས་མོ་བྱ་ལོ་ (female Iron-Bird); 1508 or 1127 or 355

June 12: Wat Tyler begins the Peasants' Revolt in England.

Year 1381 (MCCCLXXXI) was a common year starting on Tuesday of the Julian calendar.

== Events ==
=== January–March ===
- January 14 – Thomas of Woodstock, Duke of Gloucester and son of the late King Edward III of England, ends his siege of the French city of Nantes after two months, having started on 8 November 1380.
- January 25 – King Charles VI the Beloved re-confirms the 1315 Charter to the Normans (Charte aux Normands), recognizing the rights and privileges of the residents of the Duchy of Normandy to self-government within France. The Charter had lapsed in 1364 when King Charles V the Wise declined to confirm it after ascending the throne.
- January 26 – Japan's Kōwa era begins.
- February 1 – Sir Robert Hales is appointed by King Richard II of England as the new Lord High Treasurer, replacing Thomas de Brantingham in an office that will eventually cost him his life. Because Hales administers the collection of taxes, including the new poll tax passed into law by Brantingham,
- March 14 – The Italian town of Chioggia concludes an alliance with the Croatian towns of Zadar and Trogir against the Republic of Venice, which lsts until 1412.

=== April–June ===
- April 14 – The second Treaty of Guérande is concluded in France between Jean, Count of Penthièvre and Yann IV, Duke of Brittany as Penthièvre drops his claim to rulership of the Duchy in return for being released from Gloucester Castle in England and being paid a substantial indemnity. Penthièvre had been the eldest son of Charles of Blois-Châtillon, who had been Duke of Brittany until his death in 1364.
- April – (Muharram 783 AH) In what is now Afghanistan, the Siege of Herat by the Mongol conqueror Timur ends with the Persian city surrendering to the Mongols, in return for the populace being spared.
- May 21 – Al-Salih Hajji succeeds his older brother, Al-Mansur Ali II as the Mamluk Sultan of Egypt. The Egyptian government continues to be controlled by rebel leader Barquq.
- June 2 – Due to the support by Queen Joanna I of Naples for the antipope Clement VII, Pope Urban VI declares her cousin, Carlo di Durazzo to be the new ruler of the Kingdom of Naples. Afterward, with the help of the Hungarians, Charles advances on Naples and captures Joanna. James of Baux, the ruler of Taranto and the Latin Empire, claims the Principality of Achaea after Joanna's imprisonment.
- June 12 – Peasants' Revolt: In England, rebels from Kent and Essex, led by Wat Tyler and Jack Straw, meet at Blackheath. There the rebels are encouraged by a sermon, by renegade priest John Ball.
- June 14 – Peasants' Revolt: The Archbishop of Canterbury, Simon Sudbury (who also serves as Lord Chancellor of England is assassinated along with England's Lord High Treasurer Robert Hales by rebels who storm the Tower of London, residence of King Richard II. The rebels, who also destroy John of Gaunt's Savoy Palace in London take Sudbury and Hales to the execution grounds at Tower Hill and behead both of them. King Richard then meets with Wat tyler and other leaders of the revolt and agrees to reforms such as fair rents and the abolition of serfdom.
- June 15 –
  - Peasants' Revolt: During further negotiations, Wat Tyler is murdered by the King's entourage. Noble forces subsequently overpower the rebel army. The rebel leaders are eventually captured and executed and Richard II revokes his concessions. The revolt is discussed in John Gower's Vox Clamantis and Froissart's Chronicles.
  - (23rd day of 6th month of Kowa) – In Japan's Higo Province, Imagawa Sadayo and Imagawa Nakaaki capture Kikuchi Castle and Somedo Castle.

=== July–September ===
- July 16 – King Richard II of England summons the members of the English Parliament to assemble at Westminster on November 3.
- July 17 – The Battle of Saltes Island is fought off of the coast of Spain between the navies of the Kingdom of Portugal and the Crown of Castile, with all but one of the Portuguese fleet of 23 galleys being captured, and their crews taken prisoner, by a smaller force of 17 galleys commanded by Fernando Sánchez de Tovar.
- July 21 – Gaston III of Foix, commonly known as Gaston Fébus, launches an attack against the regents for King Charles V of France, defeating a brigade of 2,500 mercenaries enlisted by one of the regents, the Duke of Berry.
- August 8 – The Treaty of Turin is signed between the Republic of Venice and the Republic of Genoa to end the three-year War of Chioggia against Genoa, on terms favorable to Venice. The settlement comes more than a year after Venice's triumph in the Battle of Chioggia on June 24, 1380.
- August 25 – Queen Joanna I of Naples surrenders the kingdom to Carlo di Durazzo, Duke of Slavonia, Croatia and Dalmatia, who had been able to start an invasion of Naples after the excommunication and order of deposition of Joanna by order of Pope Urban VI]. The Duke then takes the throne as King Carlo III.
- August – Kęstutis overthrows his nephew, Jogaila, as Grand Duke of Lithuania. Jogaila is allowed to remain as governor of eastern Lithuania. This marks the beginning of the Lithuanian Civil War (1381–84).
- September 25 – King Wenceslaus IV of Bohemia grants Count Bernhard of Wurttemberg permission to rebuild fortresses that had been destroyed during the war with the Swabian League, despite an order by the Holy Roman Emperor Karl that forbids rearmament within the Empire.
- September 27 – John IV, Duke of Brittany, executes the Second Treaty of Guérande with Charles VI of France, pledging the Duchy's neutrality in any war between France and England.

=== October–December ===
- October 10 – The Church of Koratty Muthy is established by Roman Catholic missionaries and local Christians on the Indian subcontinent at Koratty in the Venadu kingdom, now part of the Kerala state in India.
- October 14 – Fishmonger John Northampton is elected as Lord Mayor of London to succeed Sir William Walworth, who had retired after suppressing Wat Tyler's rebellion.
- November 3 – The English Parliament assembles at Westminster on orders of King Richard II. The House of Commons elects Sir Richard Waldegrave as the Speaker of the House. The Parliament meets for almost four months before being adjourned on February 25.
- December 26 – Count Febus of Foix and the Duke of Berry meet at Capestang and work out an agreement to end their war, with the Duke agreeing to cease support of Febus's enemies, the Armagnacs, and Febus agreeing to recognize the Duke's authority over Languedoc.

=== Date not known ===
- Timur conquers east Persia, ending the rule of the Sarbadar dynasty.
- Sonam Drakpa deposes Drakpa Changchub as ruler of Tibet.
- The Ming dynasty of China annexes the areas of the old Kingdom of Dali, in modern-day Yunnan and Guizhou provinces, inhabited by the Miao and Yao peoples. Hundreds of thousands of Chinese (including military colonists) will migrate there from the rest of China.
- In Ming dynasty China, the lijia census registration system begun in 1371 is now universally imposed, during the reign of the Hongwu Emperor. The census counts 59,873,305 people living in China in this year. This depicts a drastic drop in population since the Song dynasty, which counted 100 million people at its height in the early 12th century. A modern historian states that the Ming census is inaccurate, as China at around this time has at least 65,000,000 inhabitants, if not 75,000,000.

== Births ==
- January 13 – Colette of Corbie, French abbess and saint in the Catholic Church (d. 1447)
- October 13 – Thomas FitzAlan, 12th Earl of Arundel, English politician (d. 1415)
- date unknown
  - Anna of Celje, Queen consort of Poland (d. 1416)
  - Johann Schiltberger, German traveller and writer (d. 1440)
  - John I, Duke of Bourbon (d. 1434)
  - Saint Rita of Cascia (d. 1457)
  - Itzcóatl, fourth Tlatoani for the Mexica Empire (d. 1440)

== Deaths ==
- March 24 – Catherine of Vadstena, Swedish saint (b. 1331 or 1332)
- May 15 – Eppelein von Gailingen, German robber baron
- June 14 – Simon Sudbury, Archbishop of Canterbury (murdered)
- June 15
  - John Cavendish, Lord Chief Justice of England (murdered)
  - Wat Tyler, English rebel (murdered)
- July 15 – John Ball, renegade priest (executed)
- December 2 – John of Ruysbroeck, Flemish mystic
- December 27 – Edmund Mortimer, 3rd Earl of March, English politician
