= Third Fernandine War =

1381–1382 war between Castile and Portugal and England

- Part of the Fernandine Wars
- Coat of arms of the King John I of Castile.
Date	1381–1382
Location	Portugal, Spain and Atlantic Ocean
Result	John I of Castile victory: Treaty of Elvas; 1383–1385 Crisis

Belligerents
Kingdom of Portugal; Kingdom of England	Crown of Castile

Commanders and leaders
Ferdinand I of Portugal; João Afonso Telo; Richard II of England; Duke of Lancaster	John I of Castile; Fernando Sánchez de Tovar

The Third Fernandine War was the last conflict of the Fernandine Wars, and took place between 1381–1382, between the Crown of Castile and the Kingdoms of Portugal and England. When Henry II of Castile (Henry of Trastamara) died in 1379, John of Gaunt, 1st Duke of Lancaster claimed their rights of the throne of the Kingdom of Castile, and found an ally Ferdinand I of Portugal.

== Anglo-Portuguese alliance ==
In 1381, breaking the 1373 Treaty of Santarem, King Ferdinand I of Portugal decided to attack Castile, thus initiating the Third Fernandine War. For this, he signed an alliance with the Kingdom of England, ruled at that time by the young King Richard II of England.

John of Gaunt, 1st Duke of Lancaster, also had, since 1371, claims to the Castilian throne, and saw in this deal a means of enforcement of this cause. In June, the Duke of Lancaster sent an English army (composed by the famous English archers) under the command of the Earl of Cambridge to Lisbon in support of the Portuguese troops in an incursion into the Castilian territory.

== Naval Portuguese offensive ==
To prevent the English contingent being intercepted at sea by the navy of Castile, the Portuguese monarch planned a naval offensive against the Castilian fleet, anchored in Seville. In July 1381, from Lisbon, a Portuguese fleet under the command of João Afonso Telo, sailed towards the mouth of the Guadalquivir river, to prevent the passage of the Castilian fleet. At the same time, the Admiral Fernando Sánchez de Tovar sailed from its base, heading out to the Portuguese coasts. The Portuguese fleet was decisively defeated by the fleet of Don Fernando Sánchez de Tovar at the Battle of the Saltes Island, and the Castilian fleet obtained the total control of the Atlantic Ocean. Meanwhile, the English troops disembarked in Lisbon without any problem.

== Castilian offensive of 1382 ==
Fedinand I of Portugal, exhausted by war and by the constant defeats at the hands of the Castilians, began to rethink peace with Castile. In 1382, the Castilians, led by the King John I of Castile and the Admiral Fernando Sánchez de Tovar, with a great and vigorous offensive by sea and land, came to the gates of Lisbon, finally forcing the King of Portugal to sign a favourable peace by the Castilians in August, with John I, by the Treaty of Elvas of 1382.

== Consequences ==
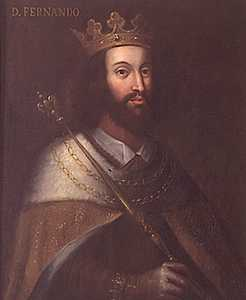
King Ferdinand I of Portugal.

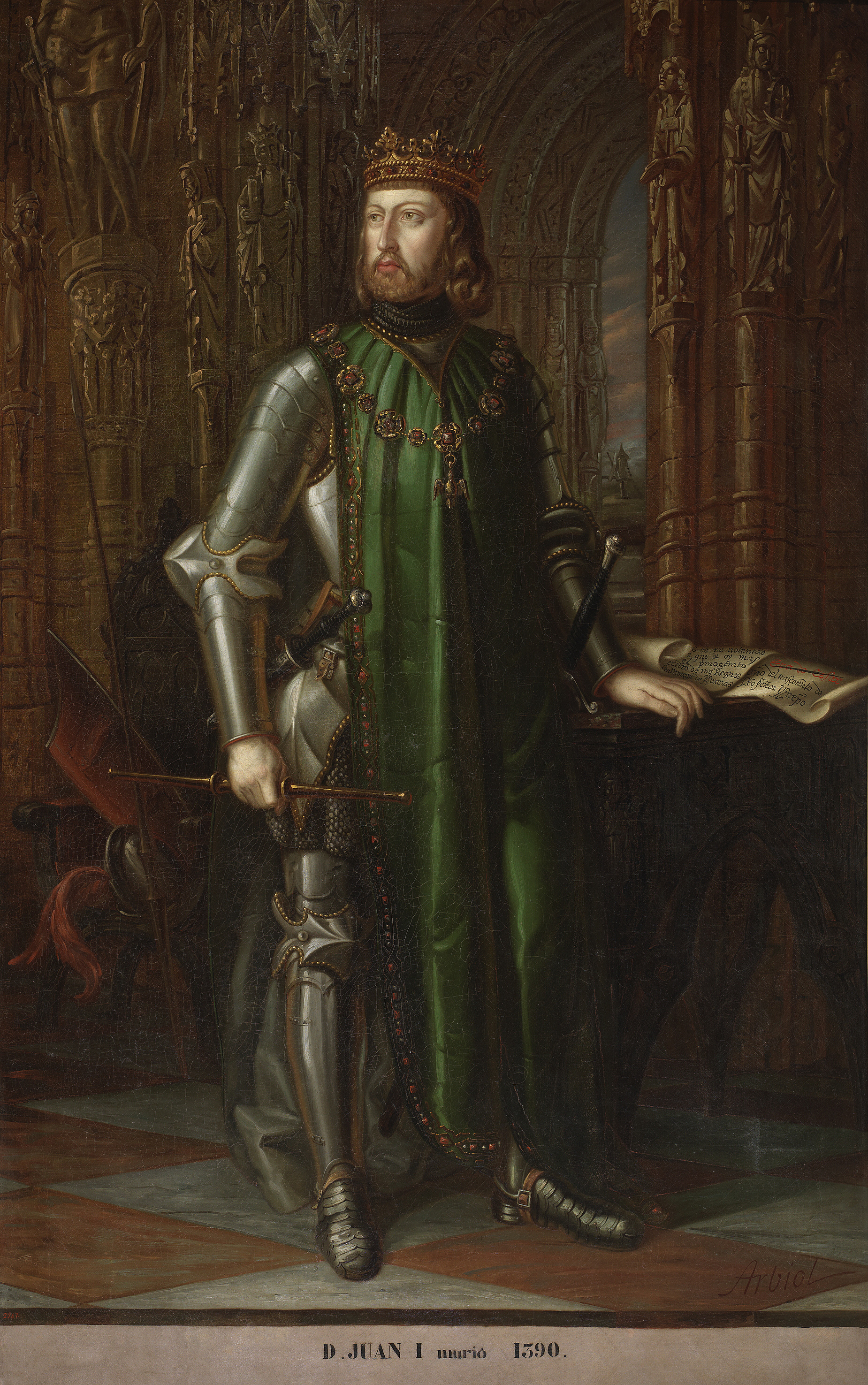
King John I of Castile.

The Castilians were victorious, and the Crown of Castile gained the military supremacy in the Atlantic Ocean. Under the conditions of peace stipulated that Beatrice of Portugal, the heiress of Ferdinand I of Portugal, married King John I of Castile. This union meant de facto annexation of Portugal to the Crown of Castile, but this treaty did not please the Portuguese nobility, and became the main cause of the future important crisis of 1383-1385. On October 22, King Ferdinand died. According to the marriage contract, dowager Queen Leonor Telles de Menezes assumed regency in the name of her daughter Beatrice and son-in-law, John I of Castile. Since diplomatic opposition was no longer possible, the party for independence took more drastic measures, starting the 1383–1385 Crisis.

== See also ==
- Hundred Years' War
- Castilian Civil War
- Medieval Spain
- List of Castilian monarchs
- List of English monarchs
- List of Portuguese monarchs
