= Saltés Island =

Island in Spain

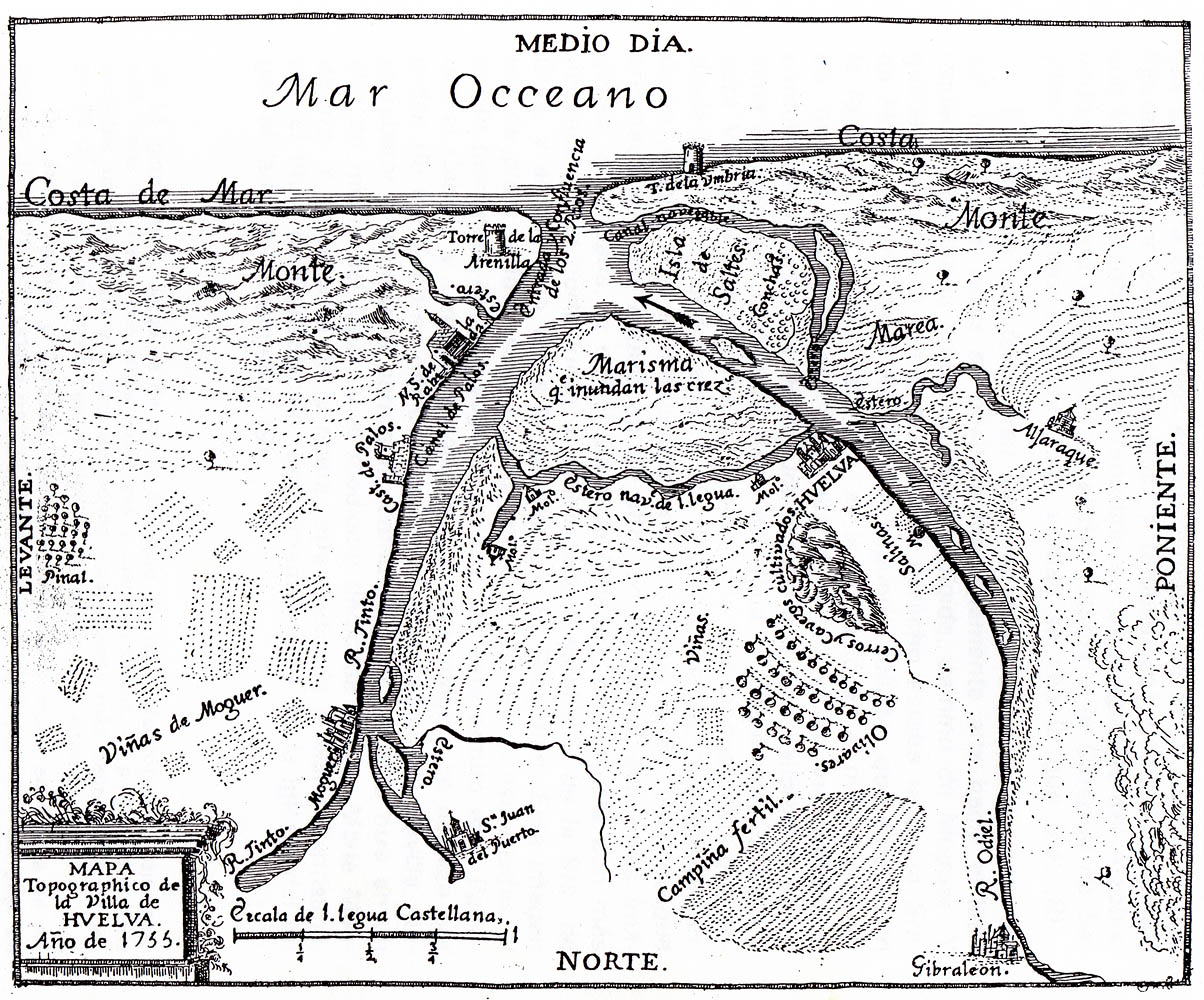
- Topographic map of the city of Huelva and the lugares colombinos in 1735. Saltés Island is pictured at top on the Odiel river.

- Location in Spain
- Interactive map of Saltés Island

Geography
- Coordinates: 37°09′45″N 6°54′12″W
- Area: 14 km^{2} (5.4 sq mi)
- Coastline: 39 km (24.2 mi)
- Highest elevation: 2 m (7 ft)

Saltés Island (Spanish: Isla Saltés) is a fluvial islet in the Huelva River estuary, in the province of Huelva, Andalusia, Spain. It is part of the Odiel Marshes biosphere reserve.

== Geography ==
Saltés Island is the southernmost island in the Odiel Marshes Natural Park, the second-largest wetland in Andalusia. It lies at the confluence of the Odiel and Rio Tinto rivers. The island is mostly swamp with sand-covered ridges up to 3 metres (9.8 ft) high. It hosts an important ecosystem of flora and fauna, including species of birds: spoonbills, flamingos, egrets and storks.

== History ==
The island and the nearby city of Huelva are possible sites of the semi-mythical city of Tartessos. In his Ora Maritima, the Roman poet Avienius referred to Tartessos as the "island between two rivers." Previously, the Greek historian Strabo wrote of Phoenicians sailing to the area in the 8th century BC whose oracle told them to build a temple for Hercules. Historically, between the legend and Biblical references to Tarshish in the Book of Kings, Tartessos had come under Greek influence in the mid-seventh century BC.

Archaeological investigation of the island has uncovered Roman installations related to fishing and sea salt production, as well as the remains of the city of Salthish, an eleventh-century Muslim settlement, part of the Taifa of Saltés and Huelva. Studies estimate that the settlement had a central fortress with a perimeter of 70 m × 40 m (230 ft × 130 ft). The population was devoted to metallurgy and the metal trades, taking advantage of the site's proximity to the northern mines whose minerals came to the city by the river now known as Rio Tinto. The city was also engaged in fishing and other trade due to its maritime location.

The city was slowly abandoned from about 1052, when the Taifa was conquered by the Taifa of Seville, and continued to decline in Christian times.

On 17 July 1381, a naval confrontation, the Battle of Saltés Island in the Third Ferdinand War occurred nearby. Castilian Admiral Fernando Sánchez de Tovar's fleet sighted the Portuguese fleet commanded by João Afonso Teles de Menezes off the coast of the Algarve. Outnumbered, de Tovar retreated towards Seville. The speed of the Castilian fleet prompted the Portuguese to break formation, and several of the Portuguese ships attacked the property of fishermen on the island. De Tovar's retreat had been a ruse, as seeing the Portuguese in disarray the Castilians attacked in tight formation, capturing 22 of the 23 Portuguese galleys.

In the 20th century, during the Spanish Civil War the Francoist faction installed a stable concentration camp to hold Republican prisoners. Although it had an official maximum capacity of less than 2,000, oral testimonies raise the number of inmates to more than 5,000; in fact, by March 1939 3,197 prisoners were crowded in awful conditions inside the camp, which remained open at least between February and September 1939.
