= Saltes =

Saltes may refer to:

- Saltés Island, Spain
- Teton Saltes (born 1998), American football player
