= Martim Afonso Telo de Meneses =

Martim Afonso Telo de Meneses (died in Toro, 26 January 1356), was a Portuguese nobleman, member of the Téllez de Meneses lineage, and the father of Leonor Teles, queen consort of Portugal.

His parents were Afonso Telles de Meneses, called el Raposo (the Fox), vassal of King Afonso IV of Portugal, and Berengária Lourenço de Valadares, daughter of Lourenço Soares de Valadares and Sancha Nunes de Chacim.

== Biography ==
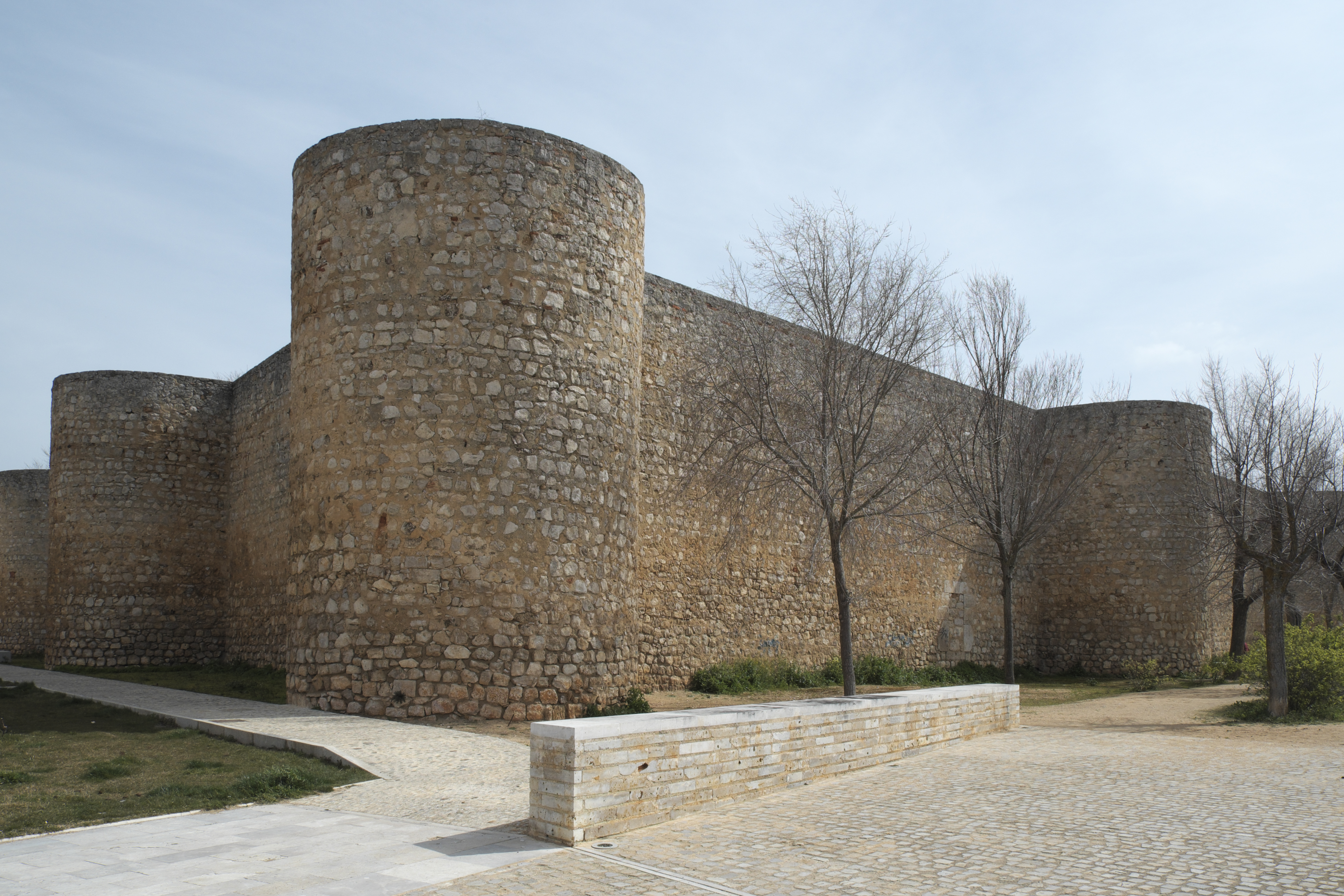
Alcázar de Toro where Martim Afonso Telo de Meneses was assassinated

Martim Afonso was the Mayordomo of Maria of Portugal, the wife of King Alfonso XI of Castile and mother of the only surviving son of this marriage, Peter of Castile. On 16 January 1356, he and several nobles were at the Alcázar de Toro with the queen when King Peter of Castile arrived, accompanied by several squires, entered the grounds of the fortress and ordered the assassination of several of the men who were there with the queen, including Martim. Pero López de Ayala in his chronicles describes the events as follow:

And then the King ordered that Queen Doña Maria, his mother, who was inside the Alcázar, was to go outside and go to him. And the Queen asked for mercy for the gentlemen who were with her and pleaded on their behalf for the king's forgiveness. And the King told her again to come to him since he would know what should be done with the gentlemen who were at her side (...) and the Queen left the Alcázar, and with her, also countess doña Juana the wife of count Don Henry, Don Pero Estevanez Carpentero Grand Master of the Order of Calatrava, and Ruy González de Castañeda, and Alfonso Téllez Girón, and Martín Alfonso Tello (…) Another squire arrived and killed Martim Afonso Telo (...) and the Queen, Doña María, the king's mother, when she saw that these gentlemen had been killed, fell to the ground, unconscious (...) and when they helped her to get on her feet and she saw all the dead gentlemen, naked, all around her, she started to scream, and coursed the King, her son, telling him to dishonor and hurt her forever, and that she would rather die than live. (loose translation)

== Marriage and issue ==
Martim Afonso and his wife, Aldonça Anes de Vasconcelos, daughter of João Mendes de Vasconcelos, Alcalde of Estremoz, and Aldara Afonso Alcoforado, had the following children:

- João Afonso Telo (killed on 14 August 1385 in the Battle of Aljubarrota), 6th Count of Barcelos in 1382, mayor of Lisbon, admiral of the Kingdom of Portugal, and the husband of Beatriz de Alburquerque, an illegitimate daughter of João Afonso de Albuquerque;
- Gonçalo Teles de Meneses, (died on 28 June 1403), Count of Neiva and lord of Faria, married to Maria Afonso de Albuquerque, also an illegitimate daughter of João Afonso de Albuquerque;
- Maria Teles de Meneses (m. November 1379), wife of Álvaro Dias de Sousa and, after his death, married infante John of Portugal, Duke of Valencia de Campos, son of King Peter I of Portugal and Inês de Castro, parents of Infante Fernando, Lord of Eça;
- Leonor Teles, queen consort of Portugal as the wife of King Ferdinand I of Portugal.

He was also the father of a daughter born out of wedlock:

- Joana Teles de Meneses, who married Juan Alfonso Pimentel, first Count of Benavente.

== Bibliography ==
- López de Ayala, Pedro (1780). Crónica de los Reyes de Castilla, Don Pedro, Don Enrique II, Don Juan I, Don Enrique III. Madrid: Imprenta de D. Antonio de Sancha. OCLC 2921347.
- Sotto Mayor Pizarro, José Augusto P. (1987). Os Patronos do Mosteiro de Grijo: Evolução e Estrutura da Familia Nobre Séculos XI a XIV (in Portuguese). Oporto.
