= Fernando Sánchez de Tovar =

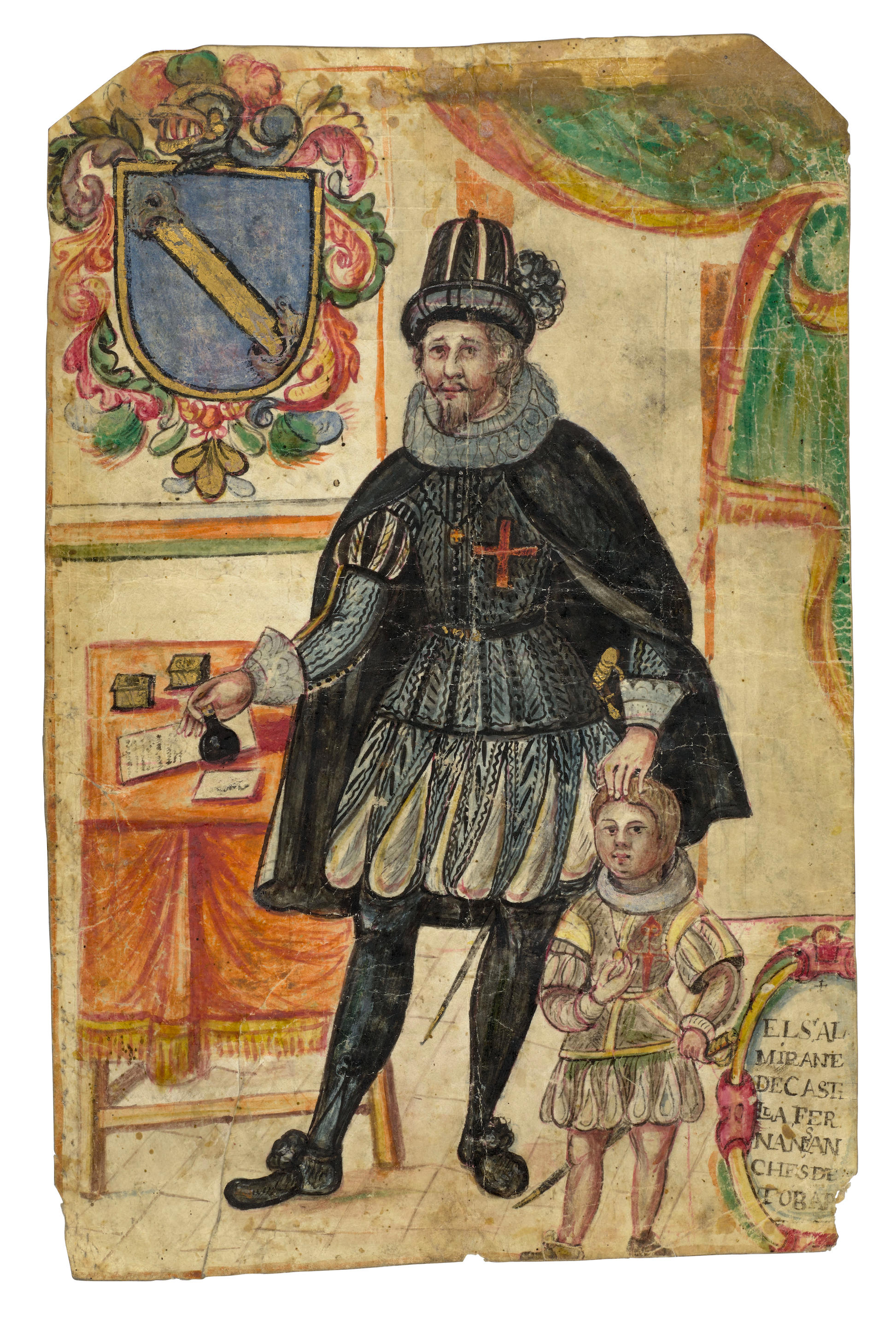
- 16th-century portrait of Sánchez de Tovar
- Born: Castile
- Died: 1384; Lisbon, Portugal
- Military career
- Allegiance: Crown of Castile
- Service years: 1357–1384
- Rank: Admiral
- Commands: Atlantic Expeditionary Fleets
- Conflicts: Hundred Years' War; Castilian Civil War: Battle of Najera; Ferdinand Wars: Battle of the Saltes Island; 1383–1385 Crisis: Battle of Atoleiros; Siege of Lisbon

Fernando (or Fernán) Sánchez de Tovar (died 1384) was a Castilian soldier and admiral.

== Soldier of Castile ==
During the Castilian Civil War, Sánchez de Tovar initially supported King Peter the Cruel, who appointed him adelantado mayor of Castile in 1360 and frontero mayor of Murcia in 1364. In 1366, he betrayed the King and delivered the city of Calahorra to Pedro's brother and enemy, Henry of Trastámara. One year later, Fernando Sánchez de Tovar fought on Henry's side in the Battle of Nájera.

Around 1366, Henry rewarded Sánchez de Tovar with the lordship of Astudillo. After the assassination of Peter in 1369, Henry bestowed on him the lordship of Gelves and made him his guarda mayor.

== Admiral ==
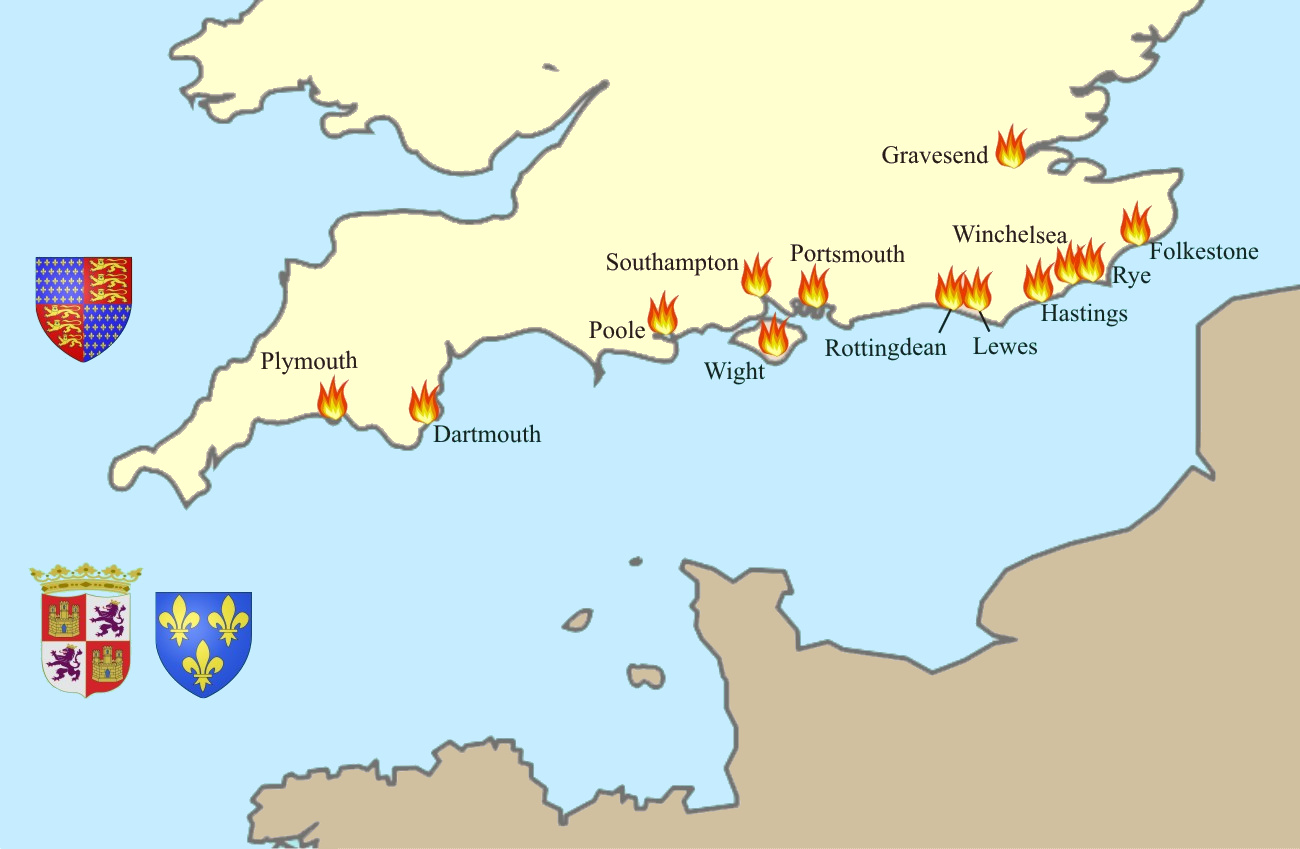
Main attacks on England by Sánchez de Tovar and Vienne (1374–1380)

In 1374, Sánchez de Tovar succeeded Ambrosio Boccanegra as Admiral of Castile.

Due to the hostile politics of John of Gaunt, 1st Duke of Lancaster, the new king, Henry II of Castile joined the French side during the Hundred Years' War and declared war on England. In the port of Brest, the Count of Salisbury burnt seven Castilian merchant ships killing all their sailors. Sánchez de Tovar led a punishment expedition fleet along with the French Jean de Vienne to South England and sacked and burned the Isle of Wight and the English ports of Rye, Rottingdean, Winchelsea, Lewes, Folkestone, Plymouth, Portsmouth and Hastings. The joint forces defeated Sussex's levies led by the Earl of Arundel at Lewes. In 1380 the joint fleet sailed up the Thames and burned Gravesend, over 20 miles east of London.

In 1381, Sánchez de Tovar returned to the Iberian Peninsula to fight against England's ally, Portugal, and defeated a Portuguese squadron at the Battle of the Saltes Island during the Third Ferdinand War. John I of Castile, son and successor of Henry II, created him Lord of Belves. In 1382 he travelled to France and joined the army of Charles VI during the siege of Bruges, ruled by the rebel Philip van Artevelde, but he soon returned to Castile.

Ferdinand I of Portugal died in 1383 without heir and John I of Castile claimed the Portuguese throne because he was married to the only daughter of the late king, Beatrice of Portugal. However, the Master of the Order of Aviz, Ferdinand's bastard brother, John of Avis, also claimed the throne and Castile declared war against him, starting the 1383–1385 crisis. In this new campaign, Sánchez de Tovar led the Castilian fleet against the Portuguese and took part in the siege of Lisbon, where he died in 1384 from the plague.

== See also ==
- Battle of La Rochelle
- Juan de Tovar
