= Jean de Vienne =

14th-century French general and naval officer

The coat of arms of Jean de Vienne
- Crest: La tête de l'aigle dans un vol banneret de gueules, sur une couronne d'or.
- Shield: De gueules à l'aigle d'or chargée en coeur d'un croissant de sable, borne upon an anchor.
- Order: Order of the Knights of the Holy Spirit
- Other elements: The mantling, gules doubled or.

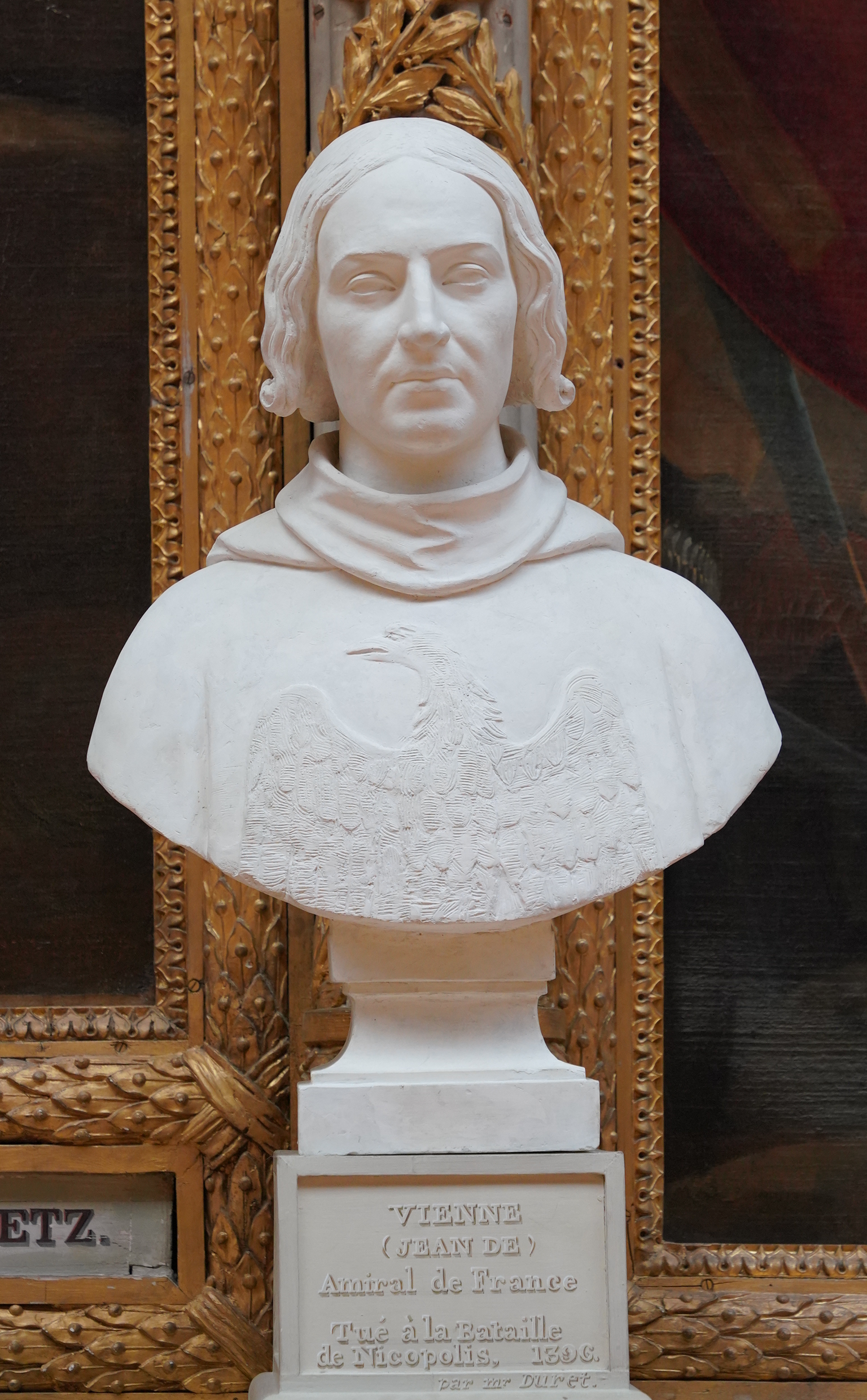
Bust of Jean de Vienne in the Galerie des Batailles in the Palace of Versailles.

Jean de Vienne (French pronunciation: [ʒɑ̃ də vjɛn]; c. 1341 – 25 September 1396) was a French knight, general and Admiral of France during the Hundred Years' War.

== Early life ==
Jean de Vienne was born at Dole in the Franche-Comté, then part of the Holy Roman Empire. As a nobleman, he started his military career at the age of 19, and was made a knight at 21. In 1366–1367, he took a part of a Savoyard crusade led by Amadeus VI of Savoy against Bulgaria.

== Career ==
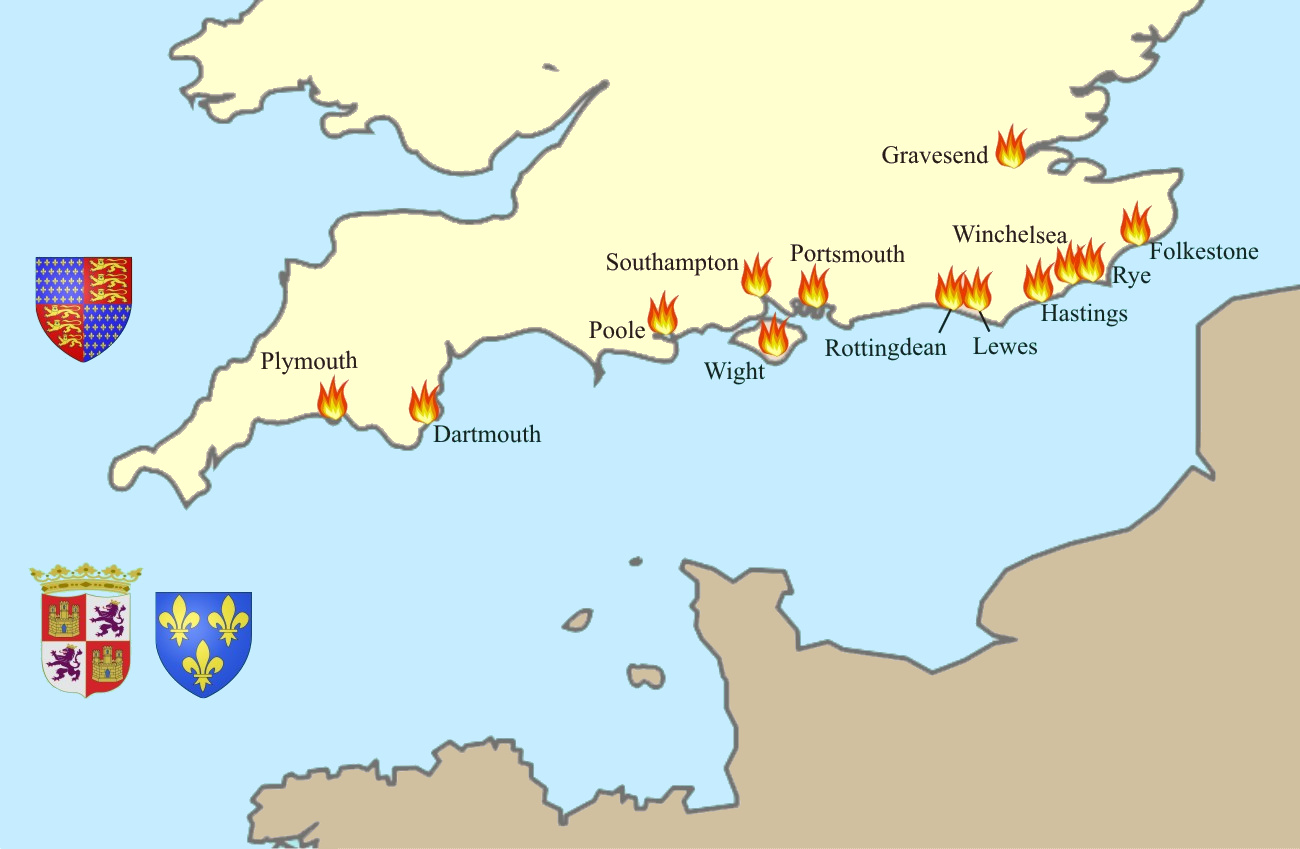
Raids by Admirals de Vienne and Tovar against England, 1374–1380

By the age of 24, de Vienne was made Captain-General for the Franche-Comté. In 1373, Charles V made him Amiral de France. Working with determination, de Vienne reorganised the navy, started an important programme of construction, created an effective coast guard and navigation police, organised watches along the coasts, and attributed licences for the building and selling of ships.

Jean de Vienne was one of the first to understand that only by naval operations could serious harm be done to England. To this end he petitioned for strong support from the French monarchy and conducted several expeditions to the Isle of Wight and the southern ports of England.

Between 1381 and 1385, de Vienne fought against the Flemish, notably during the Battle of Roosebeke. In 1385, he defeated an English fleet under Thomas Percy, 1st Earl of Worcester which was trying to blockade the French in the estuary of Sluis. In pursuit of his dream of threatening the English at home, in 1385 he used a 180-ship fleet to land an army in Scotland with the intent of invading England; the force successfully besieged Wark on Tweed Castle in Northumberland but eventually had to withdraw. After Charles VI succeeded his father Charles V to the Throne of France, the navy was allowed to decay, since Charles VI did not share his father's concern for naval affairs. Disappointed, de Vienne participated in the Barbary Crusade and joined in the crusade of King Sigismund of Hungary against the Turks. He was killed in Bulgaria at the Battle of Nicopolis in 1396.

== Legacy ==
Several ships of the modern French Navy were named after Jean de Vienne, the most notable of which include:

- The cruiser Jean de Vienne, completed in 1937, scuttled at Toulon in November 1942
- The F70 type frigate Jean de Vienne, completed in 1984, decommissioned in 2019.
