= Castilian Civil War =

Castilian Civil War may refer to:

- Castilian Civil War of 1351–1369
- Castilian Civil War of 1437–1445
- War of the Castilian Succession of 1475–1479
