= John I of Castile =

King of Castile and León from 1379 to 1390

John I
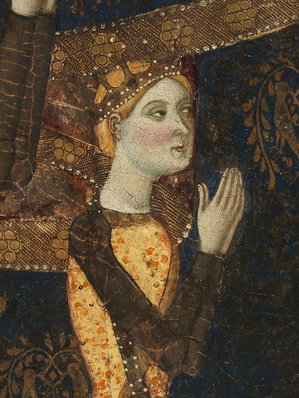
- Depiction of John as young infante by Jaume Serra (c. 1375)

King of Castile and León
- Reign: 29 May 1379 – 9 October 1390
- Coronation: 25 July 1379
- Predecessor: Henry II
- Successor: Henry III
- Born: 24 August 1358; Épila, Crown of Aragon
- Died: 9 October 1390 (aged 32); Alcalá de Henares, Crown of Castile
- Burial: Cathedral of Toledo
- Spouses: Eleanor of Aragon (m. 1375; died 1382) Beatrice of Portugal (m. 1383)
- Issue: Henry III of Castile; Ferdinand I of Aragon
- House: Trastámara
- Father: Henry II of Castile
- Mother: Juana Manuel

John I (Spanish: Juan I; 24 August 1358 – 9 October 1390) was King of Castile and León from 1379 until 1390. He was the son of Henry II and Juana Manuel of Castile. John ascended to the throne in 1379, and in 1383, he married Beatrice, the daughter of King Ferdinand I of Portugal. When Ferdinand died that same year, John, aiming to enforce his claim on the Portuguese crown through his wife, brought the country into the 1383–1385 Crisis. His forces faced resistance from Portuguese factions supporting John of Aviz. The conflict culminated in the Battle of Aljubarrota in 1385, where John suffered a defeat, ensuring Portugal's independence.

To secure Castile, he married his son Henry to the daughter of John of Gaunt, linking the Trastámara and Plantagenet dynasties. He died in 1390 when he fell from his horse during a fantasia performance. His death led to minority rule under his son, Henry III.

== Biography ==
In 1379, John I formed the short-lived military order of the Order of the Pigeon, known for its large feasts which included eating the organization's namesake, the pigeon. Unlike his father, John I seems to have been more tolerant towards Jews, even making legal exemptions for some, such as Abraham David Taroç.

In the summer of 1380, a combined Spanish-French fleet of 20 galleys under the command of Fernando Sánchez de Tovar departed from Seville to launch a raid on Gravesend. The town was sacked and burned down and some surrounding towns suffered the same.

He ransomed Leo V of the House of Lusignan, the last Latin king of the Armenian Kingdom of Cilicia, from the Mamluks and out of pity granted him the lifetime lordship of Madrid, Villa Real and Andújar in 1383.

He engaged in hostilities with Portugal; his first quarrel with the Portuguese was settled in 1382, and later, on 14 May 1383, he married Beatrice of Portugal, daughter of King Ferdinand I of Portugal. On the death of his father-in-law (22 October 1383), John endeavoured to enforce the claims of his wife, Ferdinand's only child, to the crown of Portugal. The 1383–1385 Crisis, a period of civil unrest and anarchy in Portugal, followed. He was resisted by supporters of his rival for the throne, John I of Portugal, and was utterly defeated at the battle of Aljubarrota, on 14 August 1385.

He also had to contend with the hostility of John of Gaunt, who claimed the crown of Castile by right of his wife Constance, the eldest daughter of Peter of Castile. In response, the king of Castile sent the ambassador and lawyer Don Diego Lopez de Medrano in 1386 with his reply to Prince John of Gaunt. The king of Castile finally bought off the claim of his English competitor by arranging a marriage in 1388 between his son Henry and Catherine, daughter of Constance and John of Gaunt, as part of the treaty ratified at Bayonne.

At the beginning of 1383, the political situation in Portugal was volatile. Beatrice was the only child of King Ferdinand I of Portugal, and heir to the throne, after her younger brothers' deaths in 1380 and 1382. Her marriage was the political issue of the day, and inside the palace, factions lobbied constantly. Ferdinand arranged and cancelled his daughter's wedding several times before settling for his wife's first choice, King John I of Castile. John had lost his wife, Infanta Eleanor of Aragon the year before, and was happy to wed the Portuguese heiress. The wedding took place on 17 May at the Cathedral of Badajoz. Beatrice was only ten years old.

King Ferdinand died soon thereafter, on 22 October 1383. According to the treaty between Castile and Portugal, the Queen Mother, Leonor Telles de Menezes, declared herself Regent in the name of her daughter and son-in-law. The assumption of the regency by the queen was badly received in many Portuguese cities; Leonor was considered a treasonous interloper who intended to usurp the Portuguese crown for Castile and end Portugal's independence. At the request of John I of Castile, when he had knowledge of his father-in-law's decease, Leonor ordered the acclaim of Beatrice, although John I of Castile hadn't expressly recognized her as the Regent. This was ordered first in Lisbon, Santarém and other important places, and some days after the assassination of Count Andeiro, in all the country. The national rebellion led by the Master of the Order of Aviz, the future John I, began immediately, leading to the 1383–1385 Crisis.

As a Crown of Portugal Pretender, John of Castile used this Coat of Arms during the crisis.

=== Crisis of 1383–1385 ===
King John of Castile invaded Portugal at the end of December 1383, to enforce his claim to be king by right of his wife. The consequent war was effectively ended in 1385, with the defeat of Castile in the Battle of Aljubarrota on 14 August. In the aftermath of this battle, John of Aviz became the uncontested King of Portugal. John of Castile and Beatrice no longer had a tenable claim to the throne of Portugal, but during the lifetime of John I of Castile, they continued to call themselves king and queen of Portugal.

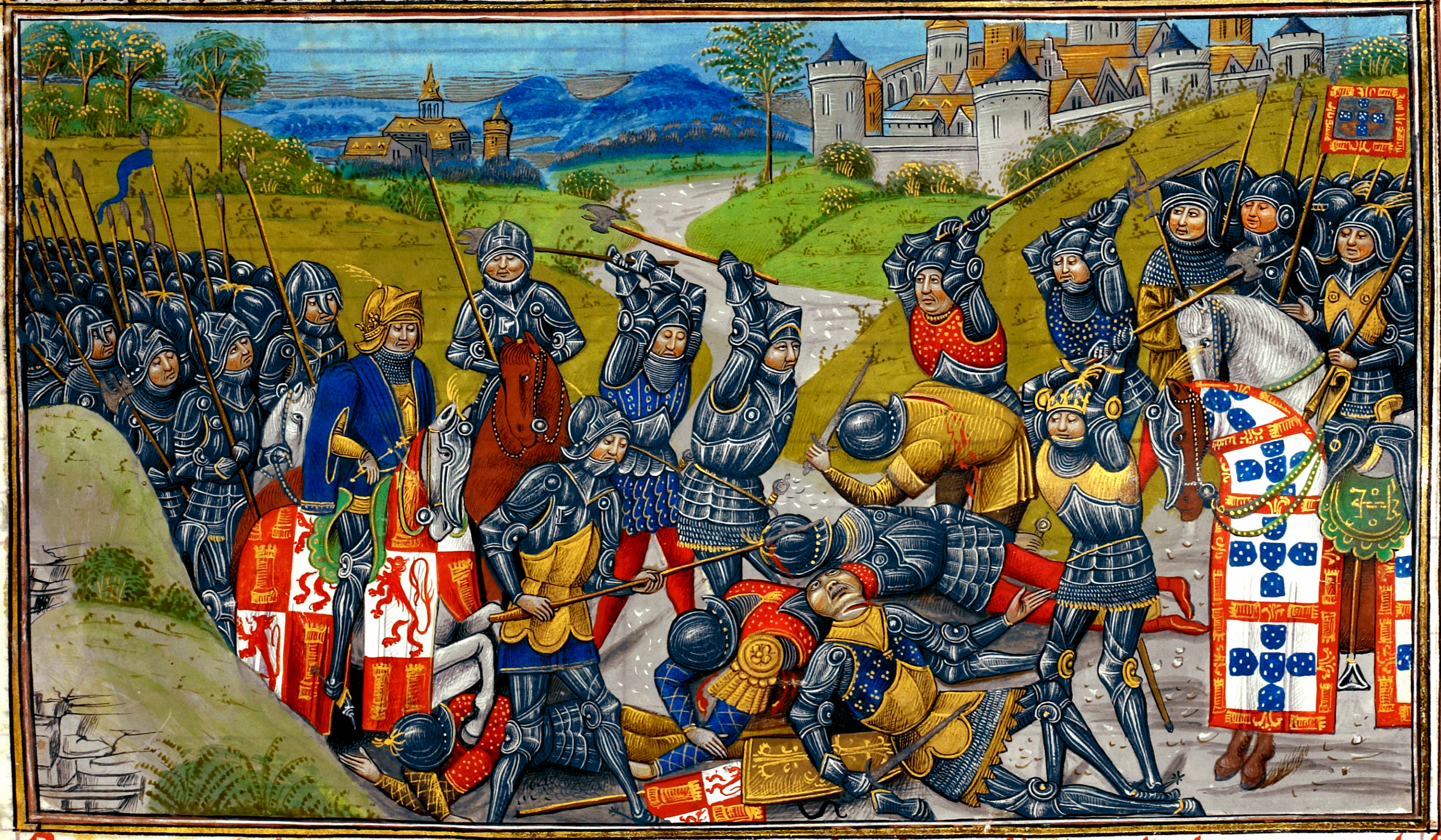
Battle of Aljubarrota: The victorious Portuguese are on the right

To secure the succession of the throne of Portugal, the Portuguese Cortes on 2 April 1383 in Salvaterra de Magos covenanted marriage between Beatrice and John I of Castile, with the stipulation that upon the death of Ferdinand I, with no issue of sons, the crown would pass to Beatrice, and her husband become titular king of Portugal. Although John I of Castile could call himself king of Portugal, the Spanish and Portuguese parties agreed not to unite the kingdoms of Castile and Portugal, and therefore, Leonor, widow of King Ferdinand, would remain regent of the government of Portugal until Beatrice had a son who upon reaching fourteen years of age would assume the title and office of King of Portugal, and his parents' claim cease. If Beatrice died childless, the crown would pass to other hypothetical younger sisters, and if not, the crown would pass to John I of Castile, and through him to his son Henry, thus disinheriting the line of Inês de Castro. Pedro de Luna, a Papal legate to the realms of Castile, Aragon, Portugal and Navarre, pronounced the betrothal in Elvas on 14 May, and the wedding ceremony took place on 17 May at the Cathedral of Badajoz. To ensure compliance with the treaty, on 22 May a group of Castilian knights and prelates of the kingdom swore an oath to depose their king if the Castilian king dishonoured the commitments agreed in the treaty, and a corresponding group of Portuguese knights and prelates vowed to do the same if the king of Portugal broke the treaty with Castile, among them the Master of Aviz.

King Ferdinand I of Portugal died on 22 October 1383. His widow, Leonor Telles de Menezes, under the Treaty of Salvaterra de Magos and by the previous testament of the deceased king, declared herself Regent in the name of her daughter and son-in-law. From then onwards, Leonor ruled with her lover, João Fernandes Andeiro, second Count of Ourém, also called "Conde Andeiro", a Galician who had been Fernando's chancellor, which angered the nobility and the lower classes. The news of the death of Ferdinand came to John I and Beatrice in Torrijos, with the closing of the court in Segovia. The Master of Aviz wrote John, urging him to seize the Portuguese crown by right of his wife, and the Master himself would assume the regency. To avoid problems with John the Infante of Portugal, the dynastic eldest son of Inês de Castro, John I had him and his brother Dinís imprisoned in the Alcazar of Toledo. King John I then met the Council in Montalbán and sent Alfonso Lopez de Tejada with instructions for the regent, now Queen Mother, to proclaim Beatrice and himself the rulers of Portugal. The proclamation was announced, first in Lisbon, Santarém and other important places, and then, some days after the assassination of Count Andeiro, in all the country. Yet in Lisbon and elsewhere, as in Elvas and Santarém, popular sentiment favoured John the Infante. John I of Castile assumed the title and coat of arms of King of Portugal, which investiture was recognized by the Pope of Avignon, and ordered the deployment of his troops when the Bishop of Guarda and chancellor to Beatrice, Afonso Correia, promised to deliver the support of the people. He then entered the country with his wife to ensure the obedience of the Portuguese people to him as King by the right of his wife, although they considered him merely a pretender.

For John I of Castile, his marriage to Beatrice was supposed to maintain a protectorate over the Portuguese territory and prevent the English from invading the peninsula. However, the expectation of a Spanish commercial monopoly, fear of Castilian rule and the loss of Portuguese independence, reinforced by popular opposition to the regent and her allies, led to an uprising in Lisbon in late November and early December. The loss of independence was unthinkable for the majority of the people. The Master of Aviz, future John I of Portugal, ignited the rebellion when he broke into the royal palace on 6 December 1383 and assassinated Leonor's lover, Conde Andeiro, after which the common people rose up against the government at the instigation of Alvaro Pais. The Bishop Martinho Anes, under suspicion of conspiring with the enemy, was thrown from the north tower of the Lisbon Cathedral when Lisbon was besieged by the Castilians in 1383. The uprising spread to the provinces, taking the lives of the abbess of the Benedictine nuns in Évora, the Prior of the Collegiate Church of Guimarães, and Lançarote Pessanha, Admiral of Portugal, who was murdered at the Castle of Beja. The rebellion was supported by the bourgeoisie but not by the aristocracy. Queen Leonor fled with the court of Lisbon and took refuge in Alenquer, the property of the queens of Portugal. She appealed to John I of Castile for help.

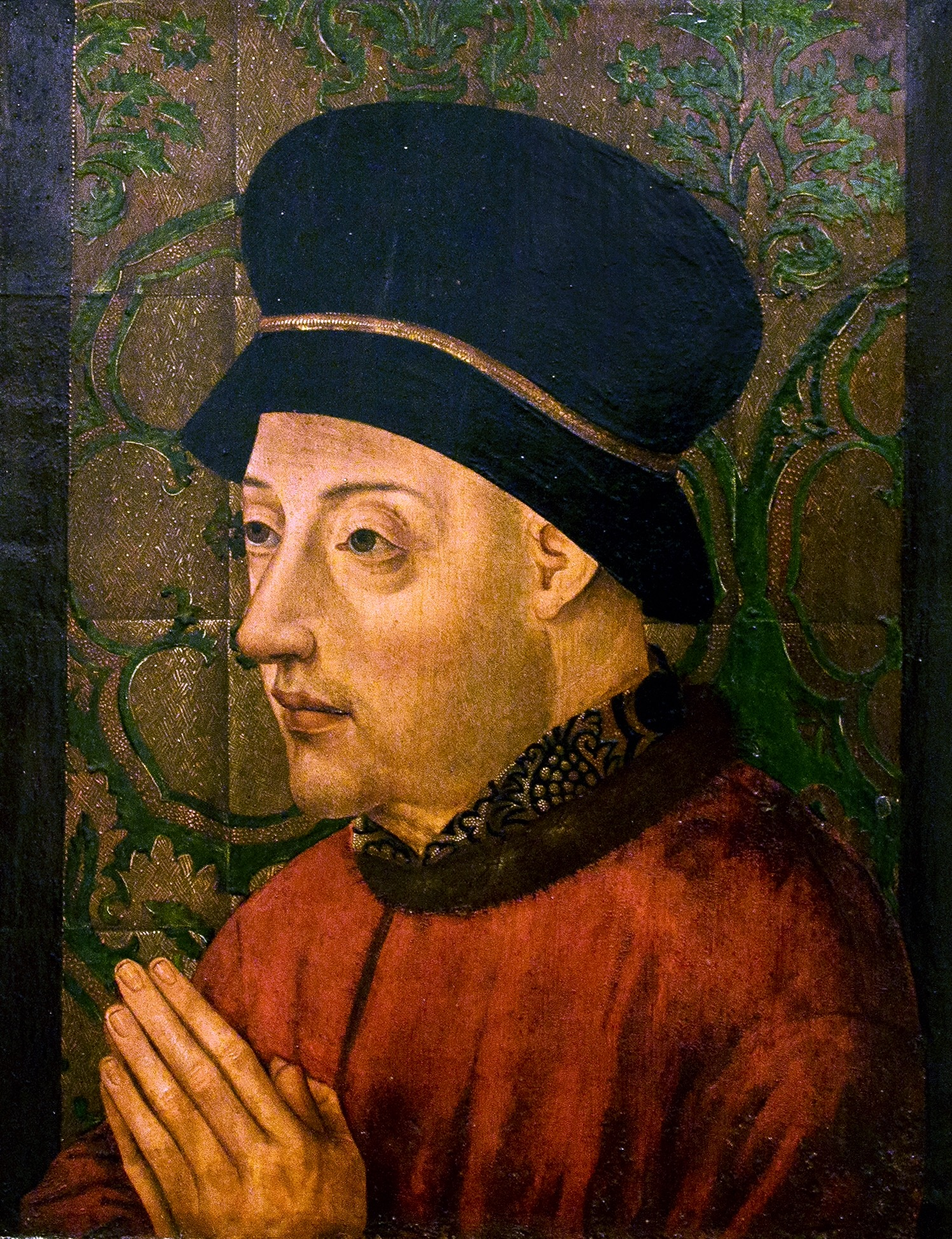
João I (John I of Portugal)

In Lisbon, Alvaro Pais proposed that he and Leonor marry and hold the regency together, but Leonor declined; upon the news of the coming of the Castilian king, the Master of Aviz was elected Regent and Defender of the Realm on 16 December 1383, as an advocate for the rights of the queen's son, the Infante Juan. The distinguished jurist João das Regras was appointed as chancellor and the brilliant general Nuno Álvares Pereira as constable; immediately England was requested to intervene. The Master of Aviz tried to besiege Leonor at Alenquer but fled to Santarém to prepare the defence of Lisbon. In Santarém, Leonor proceeded to raise an army and sought help from John I of Castile, who decided to take command of the situation in Portugal, and left a Regency Council consisting of the Marquis of Villena, the Archbishop of Toledo and the Steward of the King to rule Castile in his absence. In January 1384 he began the journey to Santarém with Beatrice to answer the call of the Queen Regent to restore order in Portugal. On 13 January King John I and Queen Beatrice obtained the waiver of the rule and the government in their favour, which caused many knights and castle lords to submit and swear allegiance to the royal couple. Since Leonor had conspired against John the Infante, she was sent to the monastery of Tordesillas. This served the purposes of the Master of Aviz to justify his leading the revolt; he had violated the oath he swore at the Treaty of Salvaterra de Magos.

Although most of the Portuguese aristocracy was loyal to his cause, King John I of Castile did not repeat the Castilian successes of the earlier Fernandine Wars (Guerras Fernandinas) and failed to win Coimbra and Lisbon. On 3 September 1384, he left garrisons manned by his supporters among the people and returned to Castile and sought help from the King of France. Meanwhile, the Master of Aviz tried to seize those places loyal to his adversaries, and even took Almada and Alenquer, but failed to take Cintra, Torres-Velhas (Torres Vedras) and Torres Novas. In March 1385 he went to Coimbra, to which he had summoned the Portuguese Cortes; they declared Beatrice illegitimate and proclaimed the Master of Aviz to be King of Portugal as John I on 11 April. This was in effect a declaration of war against Castile and its claims to the Portuguese throne. Recovering from his recent defeats, the new monarch began his campaign to regain the northern kingdom, and took Viana do Castelo, Braga and Guimarães.

John I of Castile, accompanied by allied French cavalry, then entered Portugal again by way of Ciudad Rodrigo and Celorico in July 1385 to conquer Lisbon and remove John I from the Portuguese throne, but the disastrous defeats suffered by his army in Trancoso and at the Battle of Aljubarrota in May and August 1385 had ended any possibility of his reigning as king of Portugal. He fled to Santarém and from there down the Tagus to meet the fleet near Lisbon. In September the Spanish fleet returned to Castile, and John I of Portugal gained control of the places formerly occupied by his adversaries. Advancing from Santarém, he seized the region north of the Duero whose knights had remained faithful to Beatrice and John I of Castile: Villareal Pavões, Chaves and Bragança capitulated at the end of March 1386, and Almeida in early June 1386.

Queen Beatrice had no children with her husband John I of Castile, although a son called Miguel is mentioned in several genealogies written much later and even in some modern history books. There is no contemporary document mentioning him, and his supposed mother was only 10 or 11 years old at his reputed birth. It is most probably a confusion with a grandchild of the Catholic Monarchs who was called Miguel da Paz.

== Death and burial ==
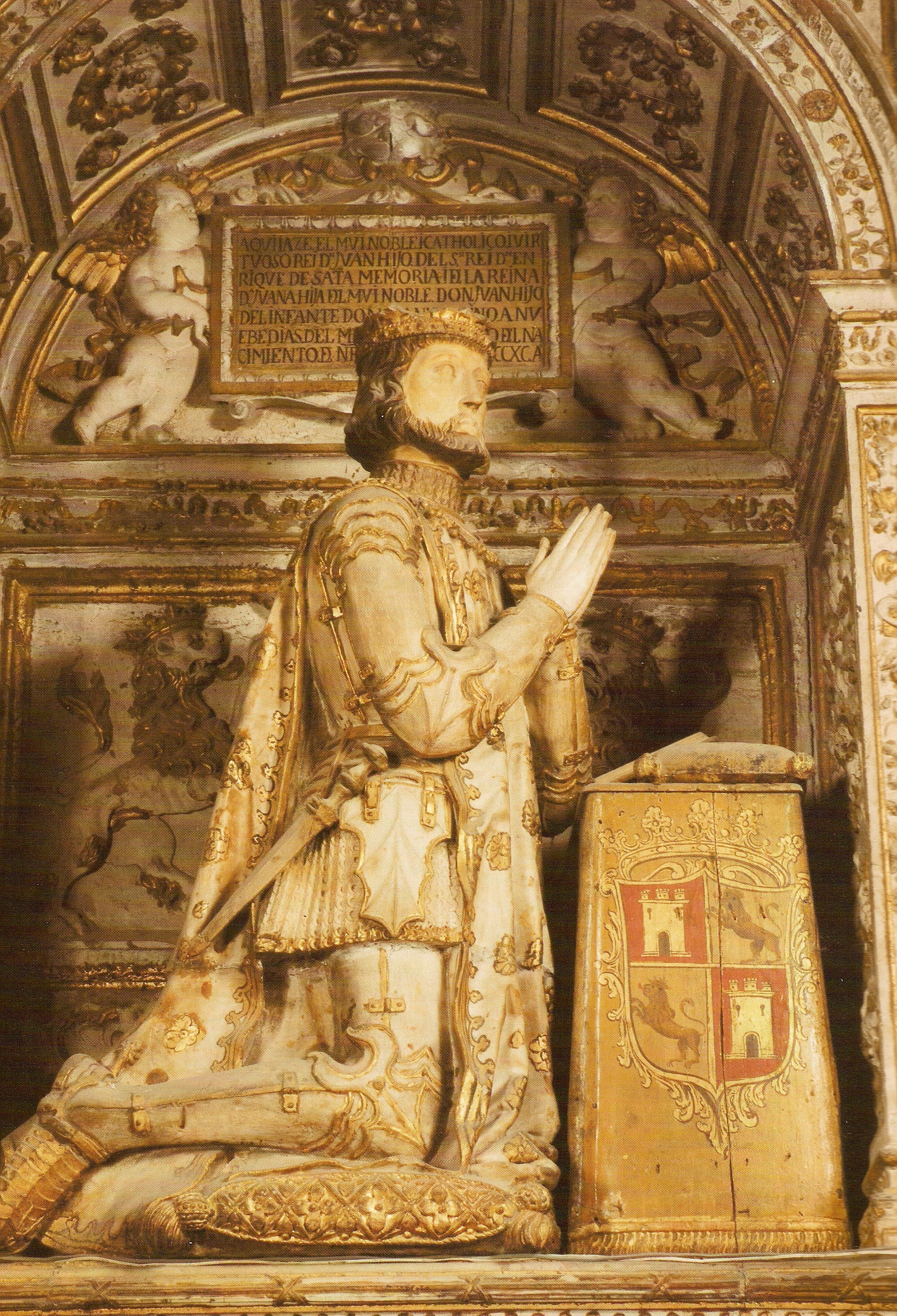
Sepulchre of John I of Castile in the Cathedral of Toledo

King John died in Alcalá on 9 October 1390, when he fell from his horse while riding in a fantasia, a traditional display of horsemanship with light horsemen known as farfanes mounted and equipped in the Arab style. His death was kept secret for days by Archbishop Pedro Tenorio who claimed he was only wounded. Since his son Henry III was still a minor at the time, a regency was set up to rule in his place. After his death, the body of John I was transferred to the city of Toledo for burial. His tomb is in the Chapel of the New Monarchs (La Capilla de los Reyes Nuevos) of the Cathedral of Toledo in Spain.

== Family ==
His first marriage, to Eleanor of Aragon on 18 June 1375, produced his only known issue :

1. Henry (4 October 1379 – 25 December 1406), succeeded his father as King of Castile.
2. Ferdinand (27 November 1380 – 2 April 1416), became King of Aragon in 1412.
3. Eleanor (b. 13 August 1382), died young.

== Ancestry ==
Ancestors of John I of Castile

8. Ferdinand IV of Castile
4. Alfonso XI of Castile
9. Constance of Portugal
2. Henry II of Castile
10. Pedro Núñez de Guzmán
5. Eleanor of Guzman
11. Beatriz Ponce de León
1. John I of Castile
12. Manuel of Castile
6. Juan Manuel, Prince of Villena
13. Beatrice of Savoy
3. Juana Manuel
14. Fernando de la Cerda
7. Blanca de La Cerda y Lara
15. Juana Núñez de Lara

== Notes ==
Citations

Bibliography

- Borrás Gualis, Gonzalo M. (2014). "La Virgen de Tobed. Exvoto dinástico de los Trastámara" (PDF). In Escribano Paño, María Victoria; Duplá Ansuátegui, Antonio; Sancho Rocher, Laura; Villacampa Rubio, María Angustias (eds.). Miscelánea de estudios en homenaje a Guillermo Fatás Cabeza. Zaragoza: Institución Fernando el Católico. pp. 167–176. ISBN 978-84-9911-302-9.

John I of Castile House of Trastámara Born: 24 August 1358 Died: 9 October 1390
Regnal titles
Preceded by Henry II	King of Castile and León; 1379–1390	Succeeded by Henry III
Spanish nobility
Preceded by Juana Manuel	Lord of Biscay and Lara; 1370–1379	Merged with the Crown of Castile
