= Ferdinand I of Portugal =

King of Portugal (r. 1367–1383)

Ferdinand I
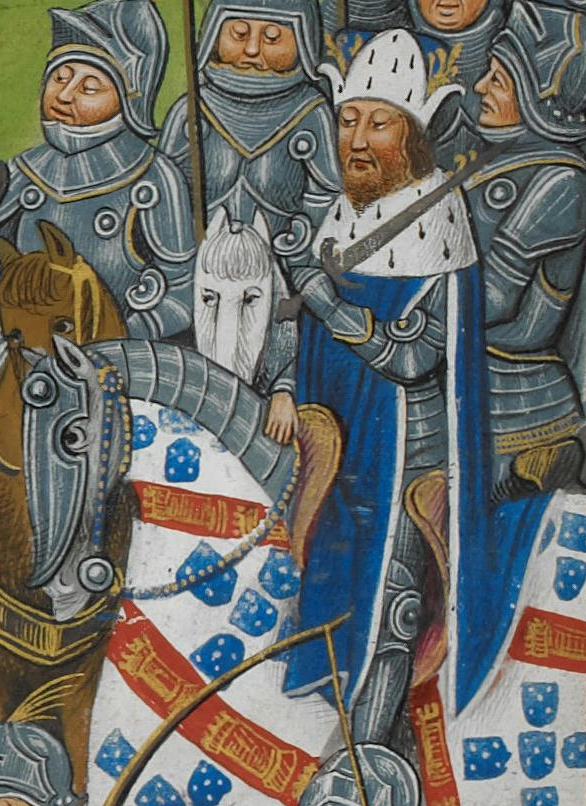
- Miniature during the Fernandine Wars, in Jean de Wavrin's Chronique d'Angleterre

King of Portugal
- Reign: 18 January 1367 – 22 October 1383
- Predecessor: Peter I
- Successor: Beatrice (disputed) or John I

King of Galicia
- Reign: 1369–1373
- Predecessor: Peter of Castile
- Successor: Henry II of Castile
- Born: 31 October 1345; Coimbra, Portugal
- Died: 22 October 1383 (aged 37); Lisbon, Portugal
- Burial: Carmo Convent, Lisbon
- Spouse: Leonor Teles (m. 1372)
- Issue among others...: Beatrice, Queen of Portugal and Castile; (ill.) Isabel, Countess of Gijón and Noreña
- House: Burgundy
- Father: Peter I of Portugal
- Mother: Constanza Manuel

Ferdinand I (Portuguese: Fernando; 31 October 1345 – 22 October 1383), sometimes called the Handsome (o Formoso) or occasionally the Inconstant (o Inconstante), was the King of Portugal from 1367 until his death in 1383. He was also briefly made King of Galicia, in 1369 (a claim which he would maintain until 1373). Facing a lack of legitimate male heirs, his death led to the 1383–85 crisis, also known as the Portuguese interregnum.

== Life ==
Ferdinand was born in Coimbra, the second but eldest surviving son of Peter I and his wife, Constanza Manuel. On the death of Peter of Castile in 1369, Ferdinand, as great-grandson of Sancho IV by his grandmother Beatrice, laid claim to the vacant Castilian throne. The kings of Aragon and Navarre, and later John of Gaunt, Duke of Lancaster, who had married Peter of Castile's eldest daughter, Constance, also claimed the throne.

The throne was held by his second cousin Henry of Trastámara (Henry II of Castile), Peter of Castile's illegitimate brother, who had defeated him in the Castilian Civil War in 1366 and assumed the crown. After one or two indecisive campaigns, all parties were ready to accept the mediation of Pope Gregory XI. The conditions of the treaty, ratified in 1371, included a marriage between Ferdinand and Leonora of Castile. But before the union could take place Ferdinand had become passionately attached to Leonor Telles de Meneses, the wife of one of his own courtiers. Having procured a dissolution of her previous marriage, he lost no time in making Leonor his queen.

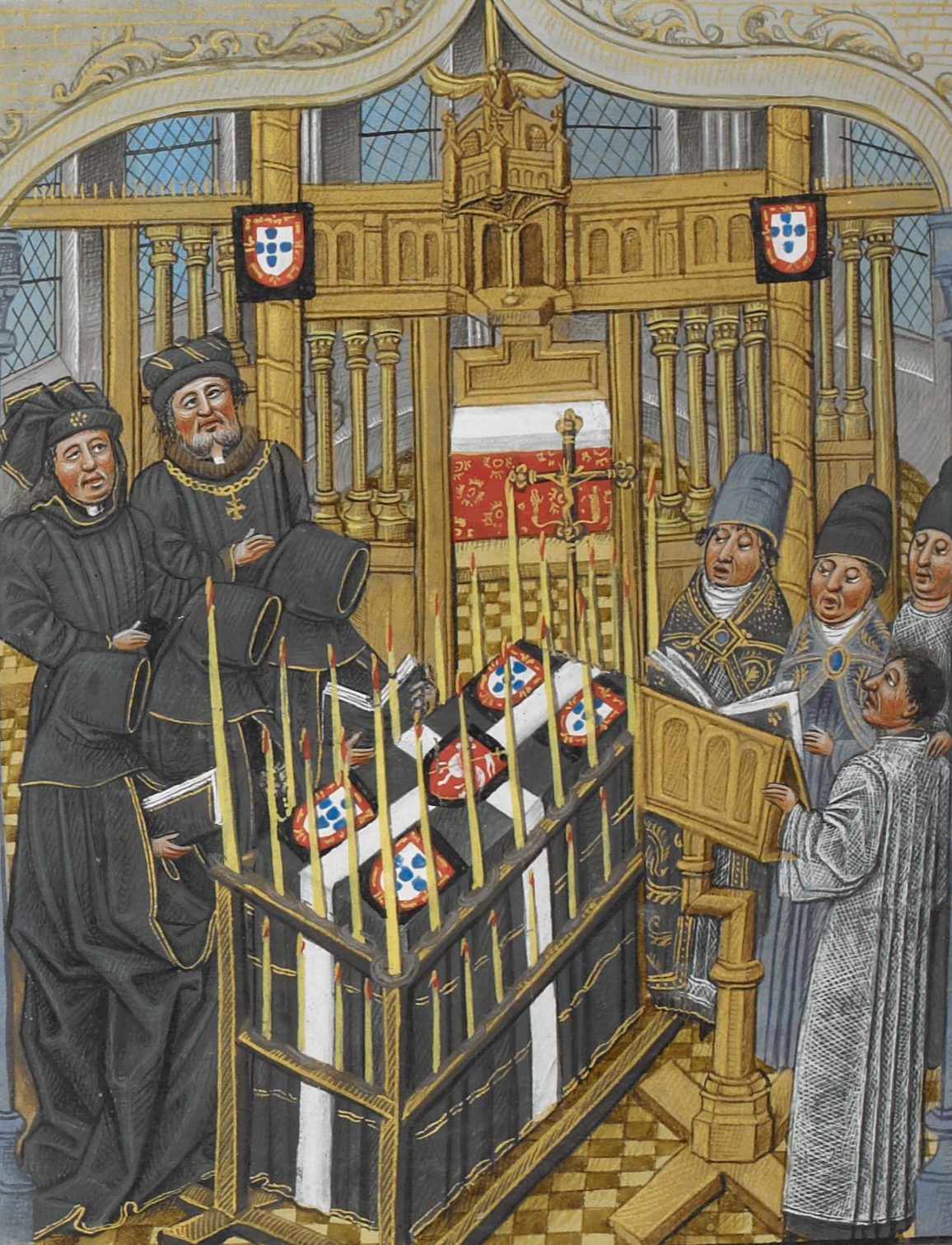
The Funeral of D. Fernando from the Chronique d' Angleterre; Jean de Wavrin, late 14th century

This conduct, although it raised a serious insurrection in Portugal, did not at once result in a war with Henry. However, the outward concord was soon disturbed by intrigues with John of Gaunt, Duke of Lancaster, brother of Edward the Black Prince, who entered into a secret treaty with Ferdinand for the expulsion of Henry from his throne. The war which followed was unsuccessful, and peace was again made in 1373, with a treaty that enforced the exile of Ferdinand's last Galician supporters.

On the death of Henry in 1379, the Duke of Lancaster once more put forward his claims and again found an ally in Portugal. In 1381, conflict erupted on the Portuguese-Castilian frontier, but the English army, led by Edmund Langley, was ineffectively equipped and financed. So Ferdinand made a peace for himself at Badajoz in 1382. In 1383, the Treaty of Salvaterra stipulated that Beatrice, Ferdinand's daughter and heiress, would marry King John I of Castile, and thus secure the ultimate union of the two crowns.

Ferdinand left no male heir when he died, probably from poisoning, at Lisbon on 22 October 1383, and the direct Burgundian line, which had owned the throne since the days of Count Henry (about 1112), became extinct. The stipulations of the Treaty of Salvaterra were set aside, and John, Grand Master of the Order of Aviz, Ferdinand's illegitimate brother, claimed the throne. This led to a period of war and political instability known as the 1383–1385 Crisis. John became the first king of the House of Aviz in 1385.

Ferdinand's spectacular ornate tomb can be found on display at the Carmo Archaeological Museum in Lisbon. His body was destroyed during the Invasions of Portugal, when he was still buried in Santarém, and was never recovered.

== Marriage and descendants ==
Fernando married Leonor Teles de Meneses, formerly the wife of the nobleman João Lourenço da Cunha, Lord of Pombeiro, and daughter of Martim Afonso Telo de Meneses, by whom he had his only surviving legitimate child, Beatrice. He also had a natural daughter, Isabel, whose mother's identity is unknown, though it was rumored that the latter was his own half-sister, Beatrice, Countess of Albuquerque.

Name	Birth	Death	Notes
By Leonor Teles (c. 1350 – c. 1405; married in 1372)
Infanta Beatriz	1373	1420	Heiress of her father. Married King John I of Castile, legitimate son of Henry II of Castile.
A son	1382	1382	lived four days.
A daughter	1383	1383	lived a few days.
Illegitimate offspring
Isabel of Portugal	1364	1395	Countess of Gijón and Noreña through marriage to Alfonso Enríquez, illegitimate son of Henry II of Castile.

== Bibliography ==
- García Oro, José (1987): Galicia en los siglos XIV y XV. Fundación "Pedro Barrie de la Maza, Conde de Fenosa", A Coruña. ISBN 84-85728-59-9. (in Spanish)
- Goodman, Anthony (1992). John of Gaunt: The Exercise of Princely Power in Fourteenth-Century Europe. Harlow: Longman. ISBN 0582098130.
- Livermore, H.V. (1969). A New History of Portugal. Cambridge University Press. ISBN 9780521095716.
- Shillington, Violet (1906). "The Beginnings of the Anglo-Portuguese Alliance". Transactions of the Royal Historical Society. New Series. 20: 109–132. doi:10.2307/3678093. JSTOR 3678093.
- Varela Fernandes, Carla (2009): The Image of a King. Analysis of the tomb of King D. Fernando I. Carmo Archaeological Museum/Portuguese Archaeologists Association, Lisbon. (English ed.)

Ferdinand I of Portugal House of Burgundy Cadet branch of the House of Capet Born: 31 October 1345 Died: 22 October 1383
Regnal titles
Preceded by Peter I	King of Portugal; 1367–1383	Vacant Beatrice not recognized Title next held by John I
Preceded by Peter	— DISPUTED — King of Galicia; 1369–1373; Disputed by Henry II	Succeeded by Henry II
