= Tagilde e Vizela (São Paio) =

União das Freguesias de Tagilde e Vizela (São Paio)
- Civil parish
- Location in Portugal
- Coordinates: 41°22′36″N 8°16′57″W
- Country: Portugal
- Region: Norte
- Intermunic. comm.: Ave
- District: Braga
- Municipality: Vizela

Area
  - Total: 5.25 km^{2} (2.03 sq mi)

Population (2011)
  - Total: 3,364
  - Density: 641/km^{2} (1,660/sq mi)
- Time zone: UTC+00:00 (WET)
  - Summer (DST): UTC+01:00 (WEST)

Tagilde e Vizela (São Paio) (officially União das Freguesias de Tagilde e Vizela (São Paio)) is a parish in the municipality of Vizela, in the district of Braga, Portugal, with an area of 5.25 km^{2} and 3 364 inhabitants (2011). The parish was created during an administrative reorganization of 2012–2013, and resulted from the joining of the former parishes of Tagilde and São Paio de Vizela. Both had been moved from the municipality of Guimarães in 1998, when the municipality of Vizela was created.

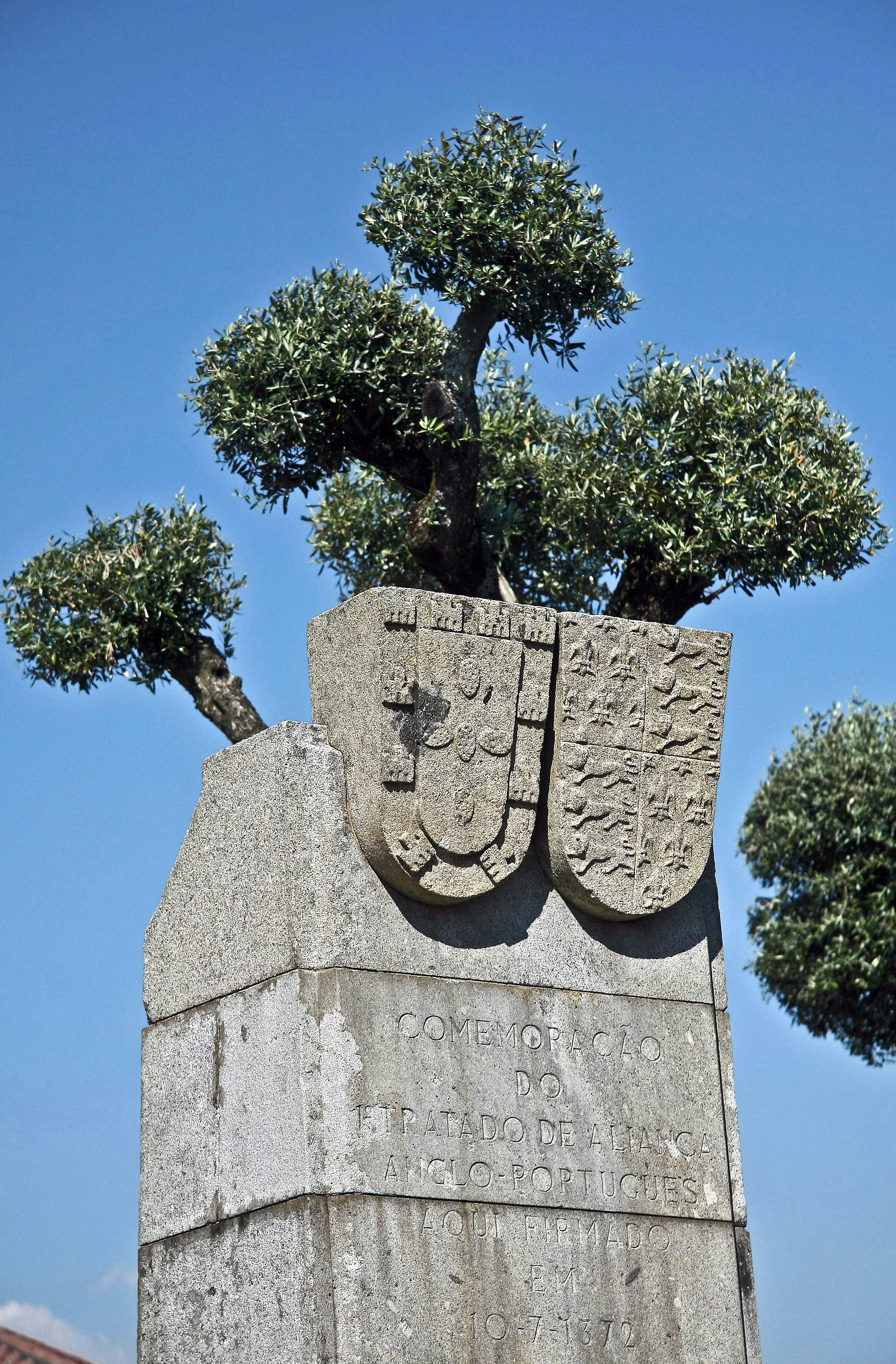
Monument to the Treaty of Tagilde

Arriconha in Tagilde was the birthplace in 1187 of Saint Gundisalvus of Amarante, a Portuguese Catholic priest who went on pilgrimages to Rome and Jerusalem and became known for carrying out miracles.

On 10 July 1372, the Treaty of Tagilde was signed between King Ferdinand I of Portugal and John of Gaunt, a claimant to the Crown of Castile and the son of the English king, Edward III. That was considered to provide the legal basis for the Anglo-Portuguese Treaty of 1373, which was signed in London, and the Treaty of Windsor of 1386, which confirmed the alliance, which remains in effect today and is considered to be the oldest alliance between two countries.
