= Portugal during World War II =

At the start of World War II in 1939, the Portuguese Government announced on 1 September that the 550-year-old Anglo-Portuguese Alliance remained intact, but since the British did not seek Portuguese assistance, Portugal was free to remain neutral in the war and would do so. In an aide-mémoire of 5 September 1939, the British government confirmed the understanding. As Adolf Hitler's occupation swept across Europe, neutral Portugal became one of Europe's last escape routes. Portugal was able to maintain its neutrality until 1944, when a military agreement was signed to give the United States permission to establish a military base in Terceira Island in the Azores and thus its status changed to non-belligerent in favour of the Allies.

== Overview ==
At the outbreak of World War II, Portugal was ruled by António de Oliveira Salazar, who in 1933 had founded the Estado Novo ("New State"), the corporatist authoritarian government that would rule Portugal until 1974. The country was a close ally of Britain since the Anglo-Portuguese Treaty of 1373 and both Salazar and the Portuguese political elites were pro-British. He had favoured the Spanish nationalist cause, fearing a communist invasion of Portugal, yet he was uneasy at the prospect of a Spanish government bolstered by strong ties with the Axis (specifically Nazi Germany and Fascist Italy). Salazar's policy of neutrality for Portugal in World War II thus included a strategic component. The country still held colonies that, because of their poor economic development, could not adequately defend themselves from military attack. Moreover, the country's military was weak and the experiences with the First World War also shaped this decision.

Since the British did not seek Portuguese assistance, the country expected to remain neutral. In an aide-mémoire of 5 September 1939, the British government confirmed the understanding and Portugal remained neutral during the entire war.

On 15 May 1940, Salazar's important role in the war was recognised by the British: Douglas Veale, Registrar of the University of Oxford, informed Salazar that the university's Hebdomadal Council had "unanimously decided at its meeting last Monday, to invite you [Salazar] to accept the Honorary Degree of Doctor of Civil Law".

Salazar's decision to maintain the Anglo-Portuguese Alliance allowed the Portuguese island of Madeira to come to the aid of the Allies, and in July 1940 around 2,500 evacuees from Gibraltar were shipped to Madeira. At the same time Life magazine, in a long article titled: "Portugal: The War Has Made It Europe's Front", called Salazar "a benevolent ruler", described him as "by far the world's best dictator, he [Salazar] is also the greatest Portuguese since Prince Henry the Navigator", and added that "the dictator has built the nation". Life declared that "most of what is good in modern Portugal can be credited to Dr. Antonio de Oliveira Salazar.... The dictator is everything that most Portuguese are not — calm, silent, ascetic, puritanical, a glutton for work, cool to women. He found a country in chaos and poverty. He has balanced the budget, built roads and schools, torn down slums, cut the death rate and enormously raised Portuguese self-esteem." (Note: Life's full article, Portugal: The War Has Made It Europe's Front Door, can be accessed online for further reading.)

In September 1940, Winston Churchill wrote to Salazar congratulating him on his ability to keep Portugal out of the war, asserting that "as so often before during the many centuries of the Anglo-Portuguese alliance, British and Portuguese interests are identical on this vital question."

Despite Portuguese neutrality, in December 1941, Portuguese Timor was occupied by Australian and Dutch forces, which were expecting a Japanese invasion. Salazar's reaction was violent. He protested, saying that the Allies had violated Portuguese sovereignty and jeopardised Portuguese neutrality. A Portuguese garrison force (about 800 men) was then sent from East Africa to take over the defence of East Timor, but did not arrive on time; on 20 February 1942 the Japanese began landing troops in Timor.

== Azores ==
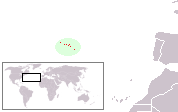
Location of the Portuguese Azores Islands

Portugal managed to remain neutral despite extraordinary pressures from both sides. Both the Allies and the Axis sought to control the strategically located Azores islands during World War II. Salazar was especially worried about a possible German invasion through Spain and did not want to provoke Hitler; nor did he want to give Spain an excuse to take sides with the Axis and invade Portugal. Both the United Kingdom and the United States devised several plans to set up air bases in the Azores regardless of Portugal's disapproval. The plans were never put into operation.

In 1942 Lajes Field on the Azores was assigned the name Air Base No. 4 and the Portuguese government expanded the runway and sent troops and equipment to Lajes, including Gloster Gladiator fighters. Military activity in the Azores grew as the Gladiators' role progressed into flying cover for Allied convoys, reconnaissance missions and meteorological flights.

In August 1943, Portugal signed the Luso-British agreement, which leased bases in the Azores to the British. This was a key turning point in the Battle of the Atlantic, allowing the Allies to provide aerial coverage in the Mid-Atlantic gap; helping them to hunt U-boats and protect convoys. Churchill surprised members of parliament (MPs) when he said he would use a 14th-century treaty; many MPs had not known that Portugal and England had the oldest operational alliance in the world, the Anglo-Portuguese Treaty of 1373. Churchill ended his speech saying:

I take this opportunity of placing on record the appreciation by His Majesty's Government, which I have no doubt is shared by Parliament and the British nation, of the attitude of the Portuguese Government, whose loyalty to their British Ally never wavered in the darkest hours of the war.

A few months later, on 1 December 1943, British and U.S. military representatives at RAF Lajes signed a joint agreement outlining the roles and responsibilities for the United States Army Air Forces (USAAF) and United States Navy (USN) at Lajes Field. The agreement established guidelines and limitations for the US to ferry and transport aircraft to Europe via Lajes Field. In return, the US agreed to assist the British in improving and extending existing facilities at Lajes. Air Transport Command transport planes began landing at Lajes Field immediately after the agreement was signed.

In 1944, Portugal signed an agreement with the United States allowing the use of military facilities in the Azores. American forces constructed a small and short-lived air base on Santa Maria Island.

By the end of June 1944 more than 1,900 American aircraft had passed through Lajes Air Base. Using Lajes, the flying time relative to the usual transatlantic route between Brazil and West Africa was cut nearly in half from 70 to 40 hours.

Lajes also served as one of two main stopover and refuelling bases for the first transatlantic crossing of non-rigid airships (blimps) in 1944. The US Navy sent six Goodyear-built K-ships from Naval Air Station South Weymouth in Massachusetts to their first stopover base at Naval Station Argentia Newfoundland and then on to Lajes Field in the Azores before flying to their final destination at Port Lyautey, French Morocco. From their base with Fleet Air Wing 15 at Port Lyautey, the blimps of USN Blimp Squadron ZP-14 (Blimpron 14) conducted night time anti-submarine warfare (ASW), surveillance of German U-boats around the Straits of Gibraltar using magnetic anomaly detection (MAD). In 1945, two ZP-14 replacement blimps were sent from Weeksville, North Carolina to the Bermudas and Lajes Air Base before going on to Port Lyautey.

In 1945, a new air base was constructed in the Azores on the island of Terceira and is currently known as Lajes Field. This base is in an area called Lajes, a broad, flat sea terrace that had been a farm. Lajes Field is a plateau rising out of the sea on the northeast corner of the island. This Air Force base is a joint American and Portuguese venture. Lajes Field continues to support United States and Portuguese military operations. During the Cold War, the United States Navy's P-3 Orion anti-submarine squadrons patrolled the North Atlantic for Soviet submarines and surface spy vessels.

== Wolfram (Tungsten) ==
Portugal allowed the United Kingdom to trade and receive credit backed by pounds sterling, allowing Great Britain to obtain vital goods at a time when it was short of gold and escudos and while all other neutrals were prepared to trade sterling only against gold. By 1945 the United Kingdom owed Portugal over $322 million under this arrangement.

Another delicate issue was the trade in wolfram (tungsten). Following the invasion of the Soviet Union, Germany became dependent on Portugal and Spain for their wolfram supplies, since it was of particular value in producing war munitions. To maintain her neutrality, Portugal set up a strict export quota system in 1942. This concept of neutrality through equal division of products supplied to belligerents was different from that of the Northern European neutrals who worked on the basis of "normal pre-war supplies". However, in January 1944, the Allies began pressuring Salazar to embargo all wolfram sales destined for Germany. Portugal resisted, defending their right as a neutral state to sell to anyone and fearing that any reduction in their German exports would prompt Germany to attack Portuguese shipping. Salazar's fears were not groundless: despite Portuguese neutrality, the steamer Ganda was torpedoed and sunk by the Germans in June 1941. On 12 October 1941 the neutral ship Corte Real was stopped for inspection by German U-boat U-83 80 miles west of Lisbon. The U-boat opened fire with the deck gun, setting the ship on fire and finally sinking her with two torpedoes. On 14 December 1941 the unescorted (and neutral) Cassequel was hit in the stern by one of two torpedoes from U-108 about 160 miles southwest of Cape St. Vincent, Portugal, and sank immediately. The Serpa Pinto was likewise stopped and boarded in 1944 (26 May) in the mid-Atlantic by the German submarine U-541, but the ship was ultimately allowed to proceed after the German naval authorities declined to approve its sinking. On 5 June 1944, just before the Normandy invasion, following threats of economic sanctions by the Allies, the Portuguese government opted for a complete embargo on wolfram exports to both the Allies and the Axis, thereby putting 100,000 Portuguese labourers out of work.

== Portugal's role in keeping Spain neutral ==
Just a few days before the end of the Spanish Civil War, on 17 March 1939, Portugal and Spain signed the Iberian Pact, a non-aggression treaty that marked the beginning of a new phase in Iberian relations. Meetings between Franco and Salazar played a fundamental role in this new political arrangement. An additional protocol to the pact was signed on 29 July 1940, after the fall of France. The pact proved to be a decisive instrument in keeping the Iberian Peninsula out of Hitler's continental system.

In November 1943, Sir Ronald Campbell, the British ambassador in Lisbon, wrote:

strict neutrality was the price the allies paid for strategic benefits accruing from Portugal's neutrality and that if her neutrality instead of being strict had been more benevolent in allies' favour Spain would inevitably have thrown herself body and soul into the arms of Germany. If this had happened the peninsula would have been occupied and then North Africa, with the result that the whole course of the war would have been altered to the advantage of the Axis.

The British diplomat Sir George Rendell stated that the Portuguese Republican Government of Bernardino Machado was "far more difficult to deal with as an ally during the First War than the infinitely better Government of Salazar was as a neutral in the Second." A similar opinion is shared by Carlton Hayes, the American Ambassador in Spain during World War II, who writes in his book Wartime Mission in Spain:

[Salazar] didn't look like a regular dictator. Rather, he appeared a modest, quiet, and highly intelligent gentleman and scholar… literally dragged from a professorial chair of political economy in the venerable University of Coimbra a dozen years previously in order to straighten out Portugal's finances, and that his almost miraculous success in this respect had led to the thrusting upon him of other major functions, including those of foreign minister and constitution-maker.

== Haven for refugees ==
Estimates of the number of refugees that escaped through Portugal during the war range from 100,000 to 1,000,000: an impressive number considering the size of the country's population at that time (around 6 million). "In 1940 Lisbon, happiness was staged so that God could believe it still existed," wrote the French writer Antoine de Saint-Exupéry. The Portuguese capital became a symbol of hope for many refugees. Thousands flooded the city trying to obtain the documents necessary to escape to the United States or the future state of Israel. Not all found their way.

On June 12 Salazar issued instructions to the Portuguese consulates in France to provide the Infanta Marie Anne of Portugal, Grand Duchess of Luxembourg; and Infanta Maria Antónia of Portugal, Duchess of Parma with Portuguese passports. With these passports the entire entourage of the royal families could get visas without jeopardising to the neutrality of the Portuguese Government. Thus Zita of Bourbon-Parma and her son Otto von Habsburg got their visas because they were descendants of Portuguese citizens. After the German annexation of Austria, Otto was sentenced to death by the Nazi regime.

On June 13, Salazar again acted fast to support the King of Belgium and his family. Salazar sent instructions to the Portuguese Consulate in Bayonne saying the "Portuguese territory is completely open" to the Belgian royal family and their entourage.

On 26 June 1940, four days after France's armistice with Germany, Salazar authorised the main Office of the Hebrew Immigrant Aid Society (HIAS-HICEM) in Paris to be transferred to Lisbon. According to the Lisbon Jewish community, Salazar held in high esteem Moisés Bensabat Amzalak, the leader of the Lisbon Jewish community, allowing Amzalak to play an important role in obtaining Salazar's permission for the transfer.

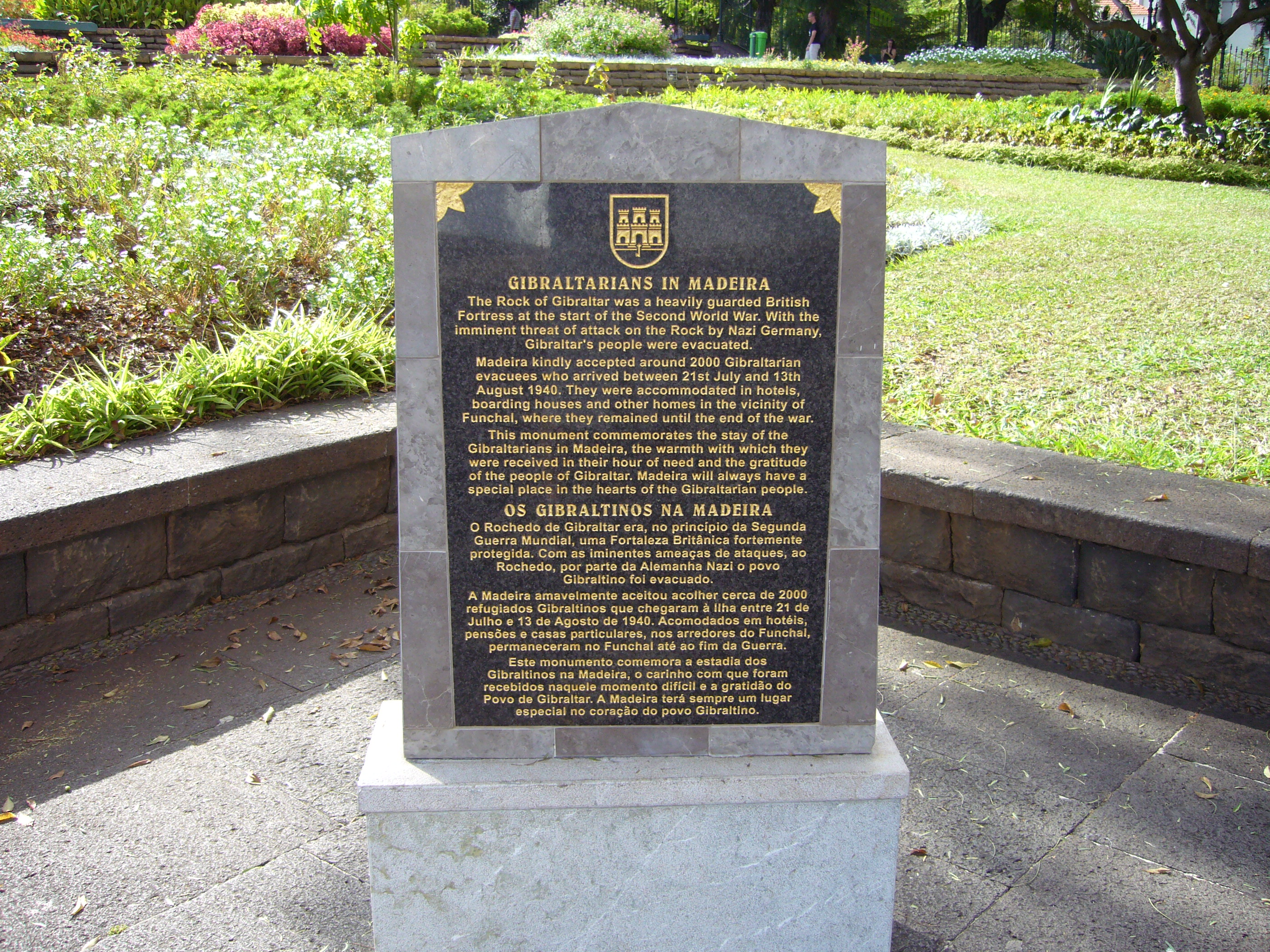
Memorial commemorating Gibraltarian evacuees in Madeira

In July 1940, the civilian population of Gibraltar was evacuated due to expected attacks from Germany and Italy. At that time, Portuguese Madeira agreed to host about 2,500 Gibraltarian evacuees, mostly women and children, who arrived at Funchal between 21 July and 13 August 1940 and remained there until the end of the war. In 2010 a monument was commissioned in Gibraltar and shipped to Madeira, where it was erected next to a small chapel at Santa Catarina park, Funchal. The monument was a gift and a symbol of everlasting appreciation from the Gibraltarians to the Madeirans.

The Portuguese consul general in Bordeaux, Aristides de Sousa Mendes, issued visas to thousands of refugees fleeing Nazi-occupied France. The issue of visas in contravention of instructions was widespread at Portuguese consulates all over Europe. The Portuguese Ambassador in Budapest, Carlos Sampaio Garrido, helped an estimated 1,000 Hungarian Jews in 1944. Along with Carlos de Liz-Texeira Branquinho, they rented houses and apartments to shelter and protect refugees from deportation and murder. On 28 April 1944, the Hungarian Gestapo raided the ambassador's home and arrested his guests.

The ambassador, who physically resisted the police, was also arrested, but managed to have his guests released on the grounds of extraterritoriality of diplomatic missions. In 2010, Garrido was recognised as Righteous Among the Nations by Yad Vashem. Other Portuguese who deserve credit for saving Jews during the war include Augusto Isaac de Esaguy, Professor Francisco Paula Leite Pinto and Moisés Bensabat Amzalak. A devoted Jew and a supporter of Salazar, Amzalak headed the Lisbon Jewish community for 52 years, from 1926 until 1978.

Historian Carlton Hayes, the American Ambassador in Spain during the war, writes of a "prodigious number of refugees", who began pouring into Spain in November and December 1942. Most were Frenchmen, half starved, without money or clothes, and Hayes writes of the decisive intervention of the Ambassador Pedro Teotónio Pereira in favour of 16,000 French military refugees who were trying in 1943 to get from Spain to North Africa in order to join the Allied forces there. In that group were also included Poles, Dutchmen, and Belgians, most of whom were soldiers or would-be soldiers. According to Hayes, the Poles in particular were destined to perform brilliant feats in the later Italian campaign.

== Portugal and the Holocaust ==
Although Portugal was not at war, there are records of Portuguese victims in Mauthausen, Sachsenhausen, Neuengamme, Auschwitz, Buchenwald and Schönebeck.

The overwhelming majority of the Portuguese victims recorded in the Holocaust came from France, even though there are records of Portuguese-Belgians, Portuguese-Germans and Portuguese-Dutch. Moreover, around 4,000 people of Portuguese-Jewish descent living in the Netherlands also died during The Holocaust.

== Portuguese volunteers fighting the Soviet Union on the Axis side ==
After Germany invaded the Soviet Union in Operation Barbarossa, recruits from France, Spain, Belgium, the territory of occupied Czechoslovakia, Hungary and the Balkans signed on. The foreigners who served in the Waffen-SS numbered "some 500,000", including those who were pressured into or conscripted. An estimated number of 159 Portuguese volunteers fought for the Axis in the Second World War, mainly in the Spanish Blue Division. They were mostly veteran volunteers of the Spanish civil war, the so-called Viriatos and were essentially adventurous mercenaries or Portuguese fascist nationalists fighting the communist and Bolshevik threat.

== Portugal and the Pacific War ==
Japanese-held territory and Portuguese and other colonial possessions in the Pacific as of 1939

=== Macau ===
Portugal was also neutral during the Pacific War. Its colony of Macau was isolated following the Japanese conquest of nearby areas of China and the fall of Hong Kong in December 1941. This led to food shortages for the remainder of the war which contributed to high rates of death from disease.

While Japan did not invade Macau, its forces attacked a British merchant ship anchored off the colony in August 1943 and killed 20 members of its crew. The government of Macau was subsequently forced to accept the presence of Japanese "advisers", recognise Japanese authority in southern China and withdraw the colony's garrison from several bases. In addition, Macau's government traded some of the colony's defensive guns for food and agreed to sell supplies of aviation fuel to Japan in early 1945.

On 16 January 1945 US Navy aircraft attacked Macau as part of the South China Sea raid. The main targets were the aviation fuel stores, which the Allies had learned were to be sold, and a radio station in or near the fort of Dona Maria II. In addition, urban areas and the colony's harbour were damaged. American aircraft also accidentally attacked Macau on 25 February and 11 June 1945. Following the war the US Government paid compensation for the damage to Macau's harbour.

=== East Timor ===
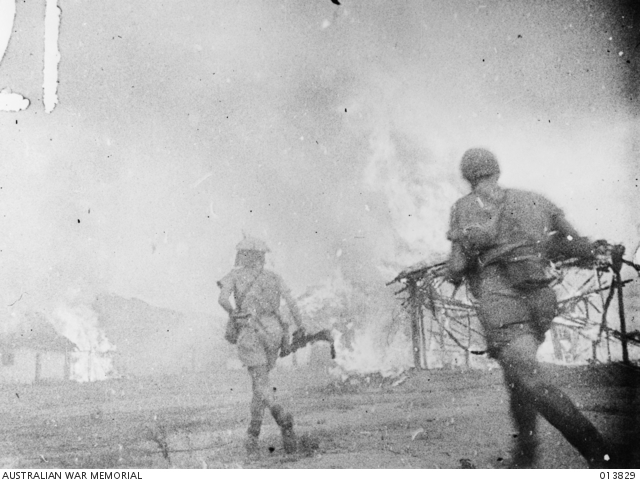
The East Timorese village of Mindelo (Turiscai) is burnt to the ground by Australian guerrillas to prevent its use as a Japanese base, 12 December 1942

On 17 December 1941, following the Japanese attack on Pearl Harbor, Dutch and Australian troops disembarked at Portuguese Timor, in violation of Portuguese sovereignty. Salazar denounced the allied operation as an invasion of a neutral territory. On 19 February 1942, alleging self-defence, Japan invaded the island of Timor.

== Goa ==
From December 1942, German merchant ships which had sought refuge in the territory of Goa in Portuguese India in 1939 began providing regular intelligence on Allied shipping via radio to German U-boats of the Monsun Gruppe operating in the Indian Ocean. Once the British discovered this, the Special Operations Executive launched Operation Creek, using a group of part-time soldiers called the Calcutta Light Horse to infiltrate the harbour and sink the German ship Ehrenfels with limpet mines, ending the transmissions. Due to the violation of Portuguese neutrality, the operation was kept secret until 1978.

== Military operations that threatened Portuguese neutrality ==
=== By the Axis ===
==== Operation Felix ====
The Germans had planned an attack on Gibraltar, codenamed Operation Felix with Spanish cooperation, which was never initiated. It included the potential invasion of Portugal if the British gained a foothold and considered the occupation of Madeira and of the Azores. Had the Spaniards joined the Axis Powers and participated in Operation Felix, Portugal would have been endangered and thus forced to join the Allies by invoking the Anglo-Portuguese Treaty of 1373.

==== Führer Directive No. 18 ====
On 12 November 1940 Hitler issued Führer Directive No. 18, which outlined the plan to invade Portugal if British forces were to gain a footing there. "I also request that the problem of occupying Madeira and the Azores should be considered, together with the advantages and disadvantages which this would entail for our sea and air warfare. The results of these investigations are to be submitted to me as soon as possible," Hitler added.

==== Operation Isabella ====
In June 1941, Operation Isabella was a Nazi German plan to be put into effect after the collapse of the Soviet Union to secure bases in Spain and Portugal for the continuation of the strangulation of Great Britain. This concept was laid out by Hitler, but was never executed.

=== By the Allies ===
==== Operation Alacrity ====
Operation Alacrity was the codename for a proposed Allied seizure of the Azores during World War II. The islands were of enormous strategic value with regard to the defeat of the German U-boats. Salazar was especially worried about a possible German invasion through Spain and did not want to provoke Hitler; nor did he want to give Spain an excuse to take sides with the Axis and invade Portugal due to the strategic importance of the Canary Islands. The United Kingdom and the United States devised plans to set up air bases regardless of Portugal's disapproval. The plans were never put into operation. Instead in 1943 Britain requested, and Portugal agreed, to allow Britain to set up bases there. Operation Alacrity was preceded by War Plan Gray.

==== War Plan Gray ====
War Plan Gray was a plan for the United States to invade the Azores Islands in 1940–41. Gray is one of the many colour-coded war plans created in the early 20th century. On 22 May 1941, President Franklin D. Roosevelt directed the U.S. Army and Navy to draft an official plan to occupy the Portuguese Azores. Approved by the Joint Board on 29 May, War Plan Gray called for a landing force of 28,000 troops, one half Marine and one half Army.

== Espionage ==
Several American reports called Lisbon "The Capital of Espionage". However, the PVDE (Portuguese secret police) always maintained a neutral stance towards foreign espionage activity, as long as there was no intervention in Portuguese internal policies. Writers such as Ian Fleming (the creator of James Bond) were based there, while other prominent people such as the Duke of Windsor and the Spanish royal family were exiled in Estoril. German spies attempted to buy information on trans-Atlantic shipping to help their submarines fight the Battle of the Atlantic. The Spaniard Juan Pujol García, better known as Codename Garbo, passed on misinformation to the Germans, hoping it would hasten the end of the Franco regime; he was recruited by the British as a double agent while in Lisbon. Conversely, William Colepaugh, an American traitor, was recruited as an agent by the Germans while his ship was in port in Lisbon – he was subsequently landed by U-boat U-1230 in Maine before being captured.

In 1941 John Beevor, the head of Special Operations Executive (SOE) in Lisbon, established an underground network with the aim of carrying out sabotage tasks in the event of a German and/or Spanish invasion of Portugal. The targets for immediate destruction were oil refineries, railroads, bridges and industrial and mining facilities. The Portuguese police discovered that Beevor's network included several "anti-Salazar" Portuguese members, which irked the Portuguese authorities. Salazar suspected that British flirtation with his opponents could be hiding an attempt to install in Lisbon a "democratic" alternative to his regime, one willing to bring the country under British patronage. Salazar informed the British Ambassador that he wanted heads to roll and ended up requesting Beevor's withdrawal. Despite the incident Captain Agostinho Lourenço, the founder and first head of PVDE, earned a reputation with British observers, recorded in a confidential print generated at the British Embassy, which suggested a "pro-British" bias on his part. Lourenço always kept a good relationship with the MI6 which allowed him later in 1956 to become the head of international police organisation, Interpol.

In June 1943, a commercial airliner carrying the actor Leslie Howard was shot down over the Bay of Biscay by the Luftwaffe after taking off from Lisbon.

== Aftermath ==
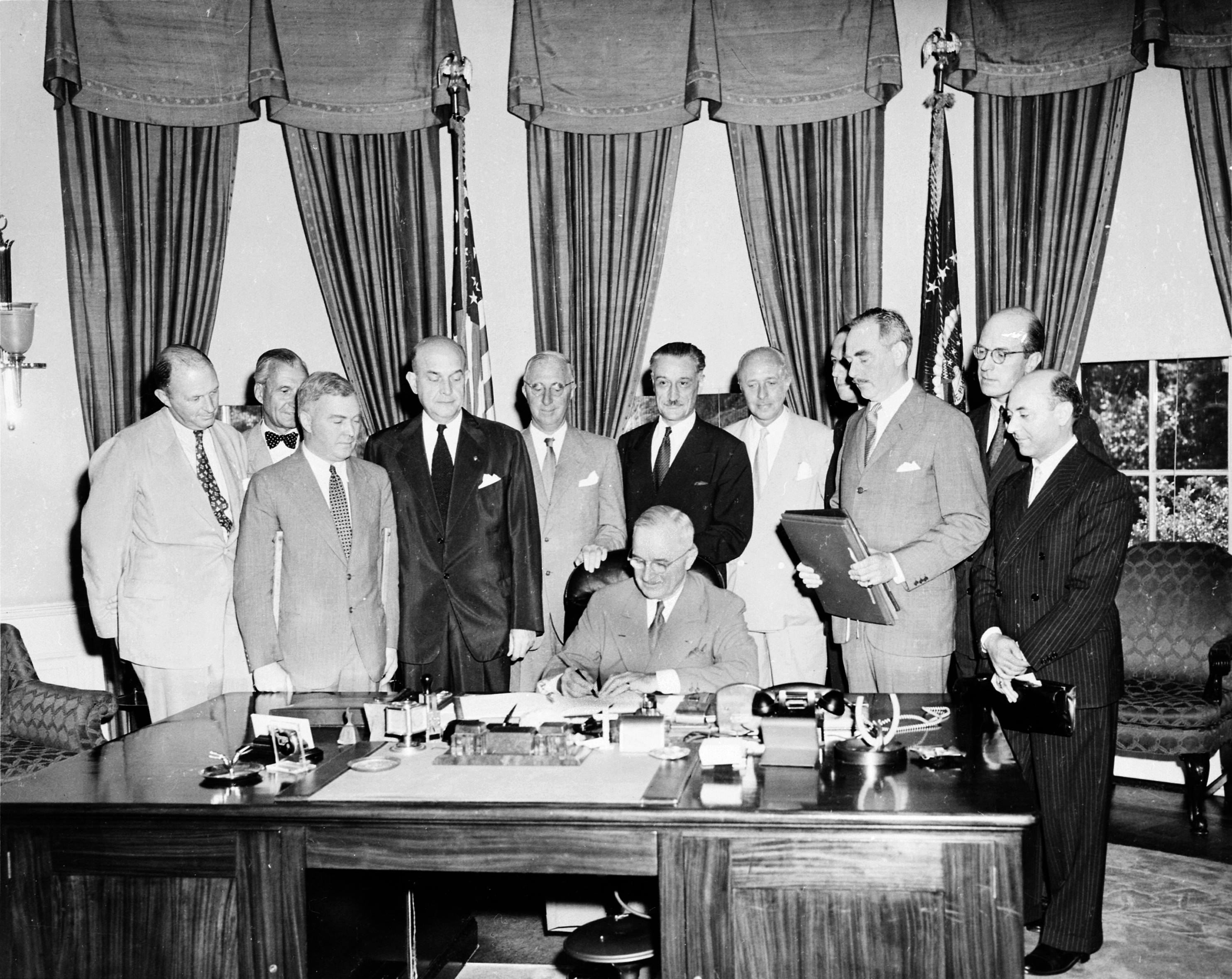
President Truman signing the North Atlantic Treaty with Portuguese Ambassador Teotónio Pereira standing behind.

Salazar stood doggedly by his "juridical neutrality" to the end of the war. On the death of Hitler, he followed the protocol and ordered flags to be flown at half mast. Salazar also allowed German Ambassador Hoyningen-Huene to settle permanently in the Lisbon area, where he lived out part of his retirement.

Portugal continued to welcome refugees after the war. Umberto II, king of Italy, lived for 37 years in exile in Cascais. The Count and Countess of Barcelona (the heir-apparent to the defunct Spanish throne D. Juan de Bourbon and his wife D. Maria de las Mercedes) were exiled in Estoril, Cascais on 2 February 1946. Later, in April, they were joined by their children Pilar, Juan Carlos (the future King Juan Carlos of Spain), Margarita and Alfonso. Calouste Gulbenkian, the Armenian oil magnate known as "Mr. Five Percent", also chose Portugal as a place to settle. In an operation organised by Caritas Portugal from 1947 to 1952, 5,500 Austrian children, most of them orphans, were transported by train from Vienna to Lisbon and then placed in the foster care of Portuguese families.

Portugal survived the horrors of war not only physically intact but significantly wealthier. To commemorate its escape from the destruction of the war, in 1959 the Cristo Rei monument was built in Almada, overlooking Lisbon.

Despite the authoritarian character of the regime, Portugal did not experience the same levels of international isolation as Francoist Spain did following World War II. Unlike Spain, Portugal under Salazar was accepted into the Marshall Plan (1947–1948) in return for the aid it gave to the Allies during the final stages of the war. Furthermore, also unlike Spain, it was one of the 12 founding members of the North Atlantic Treaty Organization (NATO) in 1949, a reflection of Portugal's role as an ally against communism during the Cold War, despite being the only non-democratic founding nation.

== See also ==
- Portugal during World War I
- List of Portuguese military equipment of World War II
- Foreign relations of Portugal

- Anglo-Portuguese Alliance
- Cape Verde in World War II

- Neutral powers during World War II
- Exiles Memorial Center

== Sources ==
- Beevor, John Grosvenor (1981). SOE: Recollections and Reflections, 1940–45. Bodley Head. ISBN 978-0370304144. SOE was the British Special Operations Executive.
- Gallagher, Tom (2020). Salazar: The Dictator Who Refused To Die. C Hurst & Co Publishers Ltd. ISBN 978-1-78738-388-3.
- Gallagher, Tom (2021). Salazar: O Ditador Que Se Recusa a Morrer (in Portuguese). D Quixote. ISBN 9789722071772.
- Garrett, Richard J. (2010). The Defences of Macau: Forts, Ships and Weapons over 450 years. Hong Kong University Press. ISBN 978-9888028498.
- Hayes, Carlton J.H. (1945). Wartime mission in Spain, 1942–1945. Macmillan Company. ISBN 978-1121497245.
- Hoare, Samuel (1946). Ambassador on Special Mission. UK: Collins; First Edition. pp. 124–125.
- Kay, Hugh (1970). Salazar and Modern Portugal. New York: Hawthorn Books.
- Klemmer, Harvey. "Lisbon – Gateway to Warring Europe", National Geographic, August 1941
- Lochery, Neill (2011). Lisbon: War in the Shadows of the City of Light, 1939–1945. United States: PublicAffairs. ISBN 978-1586488796.
- McNab, Chris (2009). The SS: 1923–1945. Amber Books Ltd. ISBN 978-1906626495.
- Meneses, Filipe Ribeiro (2009). Salazar: A Political Biography. Enigma Books; 1 edition. p. 544. ISBN 978-1-929631-90-2.
- Milgram, Avraham (2011). Portugal, Salazar, and the Jews. Yad Vashem. p. 324. ISBN 9789653083875.
- Rendel, Sir George (1957). The Sword and the Olive – Recollections of Diplomacy and Foreign Service 1913–1954 (First ed.). John Murray. ASIN B000UVRG60.
- Stein, George H (1984). The Waffen SS: Hitler's Elite Guard at War, 1939–1945. Cornell University Press. ISBN 978-0801492754.
- Wheeler, Douglas L. "The Price of Neutrality: Portugal, the Wolfram Question, and World War II". Luso-Brazilian Review, Vol. 23, No. 1 (Summer, 1986), pp. 107–127
