= Cape Verde in World War II =

Cape Verde (also known as Cabo Verde) remained a Portuguese colony throughout World War II. Portugal and its colonial empire were officially neutral but gradually came to support the Allies in the conflict. While no major battles took place in or around Cape Verde, the archipelago was still of key strategic importance to the Allies throughout the war. Several important domestic developments took place in Cape Verde during and as a result of the war.

== History ==
The Suez Canal was traditionally how Britain reached its lucrative and important eastern colonies such as India, but the canal became a battleground during the war as the Axis tried to capture it from the Allies. As such, the Allies needed to rely on Atlantic islands and archipelagos such as Cape Verde for their critical supply lines between Europe and South and East Asia.

Throughout the war, Allied ships were stationed at the Cape Verdean city of Mindelo on the island of São Vicente.

An allied invasion of several Atlantic islands belonging to Portugal was planned and code named Operation Alacrity. U.S. President Franklin D. Roosevelt also wanted to include an invasion of Cape Verde to be part of the plan, openly saying that Axis occupation of Cape Verde would threaten U.S. safety and would force the U.S. to act upon its Monroe Doctrine. This statement came in mid-1941, before the Attack on Pearl Harbor and led U.S. military officials to draft War Plan Gray, a predecessor to Operation Alacrity that included solely the United States. Neither War Plan Gray nor Operation Alacrity ever came to fruition, as the Axis could never reasonably threaten Portugal's Atlantic island territories with an invasion.

In 1941, three German U-boats were ambushed by Allied naval forces off the coast of Cape Verde. The location of the U-boats was only found out after Alan Turing and the British government cracked the Enigma encryption code used by the Germans. The attack off of Cape Verde led German Admiral Karl Dönitz to conclude that the Enigma cipher had been compromised by the Allies.

Cape Verde saw its worst ever famines during World War II, specifically from 1941 to 1943 and 1947 to 1948. The famines caused the deaths of an estimated 45,000 Cape Verdeans and led thousands more to flee the country, with many coming to the islands of São Tomé and Príncipe, also controlled by Portugal at the time.

Several Cape Verdean Americans fought in the U.S. Army and U.S. Navy during the conflict, serving in both the European and Asian theaters of the war.

The political and economic situation of the post-war world eventually allowed Cape Verde to gain independence from the Portuguese Empire in 1975, as part of a much larger trend of decolonization across the world.

== See also ==
- Anglo-Portuguese Alliance
- Battle of the Atlantic
- Naval history of World War II
- Operation Alacrity
