= João Pedro (footballer, born 1989) =

Portuguese footballer

Personal information
- Full name: João Pedro Pinto Silva
- Date of birth: 26 April 1989 (age 37)
- Place of birth: Vizela, Portugal
- Height: 1.83 m (6 ft 0 in)
- Position: Defender

Team information
- Current team: CR Flamengo B (head coach)

Youth career
- 2002–2008: Vizela

Senior career*
| Years | Team | Apps | (Gls) |
| 2008–2021 | Vizela | 188 | (31) |

Managerial career
- 2021-2023: Vizela
- 2023-: CR Flamengo B
- * Club domestic league appearances and goals

João Pedro, known as João Pedro (born 26 April 1989), is a Portuguese football manager and former football player.

== Club career ==
He made his professional debut in the Segunda Liga for Vizela on 10 September 2008 in a game against Braga B. Having played 263 league matches for Vizela he is considered a club legend, scoring the winner in final match-day of the league to grab 3rd place in the 07/08 season.

== Managerial career ==
João signed his first manager contract with Vizela on 8 December 2021.
