= Anglo-Portuguese Treaty of 1878 =

- Signed: December 26, 1878
- Location: Lisbon
- Effective: January 15, 1880
- Expiration: January 14, 1892

Anglo-Portuguese relations
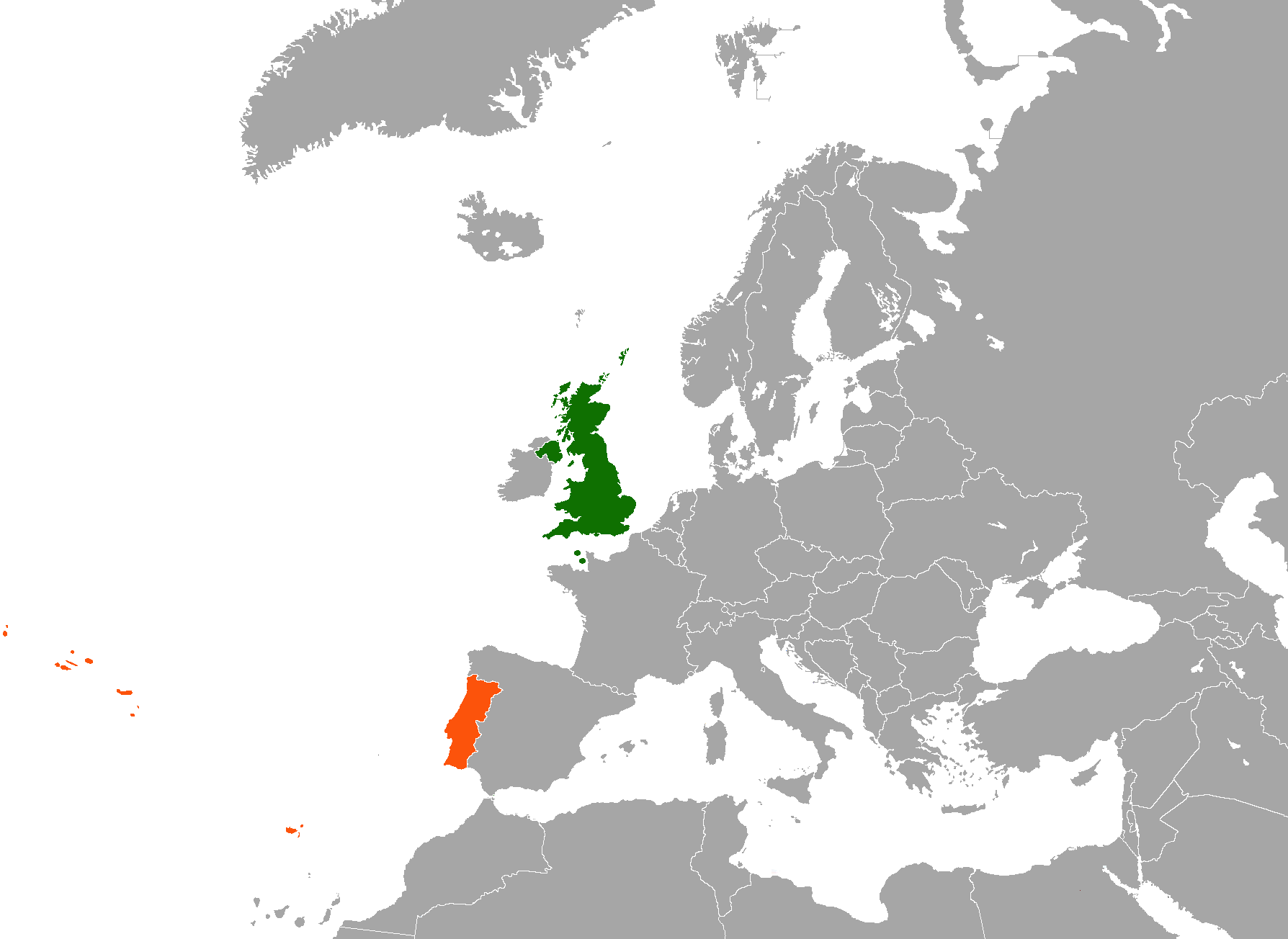

- United Kingdom: Portugal

The Anglo-Portuguese Treaty of 1878 was an economic agreement between Portugal and the United Kingdom regarding their trade and a railway between their colonies in India. This treaty was in keeping with the Anglo-Portuguese Alliance that dated back to the 14th century.

== Aims ==
Portugal wanted to end Portuguese India's trade isolation, in order to expand its economy. This would be through a Customs Union with British India, and the construction of a railway line. Portugal offered Britain a monopoly on Goan salt production in return. Goan salt was considered to be a threat to the salt monopoly exercised by the colonial government in British India.

== Main features ==
The main features of the treaty were:

- Reciprocal freedom of commerce, navigation and transit between the two Indias;
- Abolition of all custom duties on the frontier lines between British India and Portuguese India;
- Uniformity of customs duties in the two territories on goods imported and exported by sea with, however, special stipulations with regard to salt, spirits and opium;
- Introduction into Portuguese India of the system of excise on spirituous liquours, including toddy, sanctioned by law in the Bombay Presidency;
- Prohibition of the export from Portuguese India of opium, or its cultivation or manufacture, except on account of the British Government;
- Monopoly power of the Bombay Presidency Government in British India on the manufacture of salt and its trade in Portuguese India, with the powers granted to the British India Government to limit the manufacture of salt and suppress if necessary, the salt works therein; and
- Mutual agreement for the construction of a railway line from the town of New Hubli to the port of Mormugao and its extension from New Hubli to Bellari.

== Effects ==
The treaty had the following effects:

- It impoverished the native Goan peasants.
- It resulted in the connection of Goa to British India by rail through the West of India Portuguese Railway, and the construction and development of the Mormugao Port.
- British India was granted a monopoly of the salt trade in Goa.
- The contraction of the Goan economy due to the treaty caused a large scale emigration of Goans to British India, mostly to Bombay.

== Termination ==
Due to the ill-effects of the treaty on Goan industry, there was pressure on the Portuguese to terminate the treaty. The government of British India also did not obtain substantial benefit from the treaty. This led to the termination of the treaty in 1892 due to non-renewal of the treaty by the parties.

== See also ==
- Anglo-Portuguese Treaty of 1373
- Anglo-Portuguese Treaty of 1891
