= Glyn Stone =

British international historian

- Citizenship: UK
- Education: University of Lancaster
- Scientific career
- Fields: International History
- Workplaces: University of the West of England

Glyn Stone is Professor of International History at the University of the West of England. He gained a BA (Honours) degree at the University of Lancaster in 1970, an MA History at the University of Sussex in 1971, and his PhD at London School of Economics and Political Science in 1986. He became a Fellow of the Royal Historical Society in 1995. He became a lecturer at Bristol Polytechnic, the precursor of UWE in 1972 and became Dean of the Faculty of Humanities in 2000 until its merger with Social Sciences and Languages in 2003.

Stone has focused his research in the area of Anglo-French and Anglo-Portuguese relations before, during and after the Second World War and has a particular interest in the international politics of the Spanish Civil War (1936–1939). He is currently researching British arms sales diplomacy in Europe, 1935–1940 and Britain and Portuguese Africa, 1961–1975.

== Publications ==
- The Oldest Ally: Britain and the Portuguese Connection, 1936–1941, Woodbridge: Royal Historical Society/The Boydell Press, 228 pp.
- Spain, Portugal and the Great Powers, 1931–1941, London: Palgrave Macmillan, 2005, 316 pp.
- Dick Richardson and Glyn Stone (eds.), Decisions and Diplomacy: Essays in Twentieth Century International History, London: Routledge, 1994, 230 pp.
- Alan Sharp and Glyn Stone (eds.), Anglo-French Relations in the Twentieth Century: Rivalry and Cooperation, London: Routledge, 2000, 355 pp.
- Glyn Stone and T.G. Otte (eds.), Anglo-French Relations since the Late Eighteenth Century, London: Routledge, 2008, 274 pp.

== Articles and essays ==
- 'The official British attitude to the Anglo-Portuguese alliance, 1910–1945', Journal of Contemporary History, vol. x, 4–1975, pp. 729–46.
- 'Britain, non-intervention and the Spanish Civil War', European Studies Review, vol. ix, 1–1979, pp. 129–49.
- 'Rearmament, War and the Bristol Aeroplane Company, 1935–1945' in Charles Harvey and John Press (eds.), Studies in the Business History of Bristol, Bristol: Bristol Academic Press, 1988, pp. 187–212.
- 'The European Great Powers and the Spanish Civil War, 1936–1939' in Robert Boyce and Esmonde Robertson (eds.), Paths to War: New Essays on the Origins of the Second World War, London: Macmillan, 1989, pp. 199–232.
- 'Britain, France and the Spanish problem, 1936–1939' in Dick Richardson and Glyn Stone (eds.), Decisions and Diplomacy: Essays in Twentieth Century International History, London: Routledge, 1994, pp. 129–52.
- 'Inglaterra, Portugal e a não beligerância Espanhola: 1940–1941', Ler História, vol. xxv, 1994, pp. 89–102.
- 'Britain, France and Franco's Spain in the aftermath of the Spanish Civil War', Diplomacy and Statecraft, vol. vi, 2–1995, pp. 373–407.
- 'Sir Robert Vansittart and Spain, 1931–1941' in Thomas Otte and Constantine Pagedas (eds.), Personalities, War and Diplomacy: Essays in International History, London: Frank Cass, 1997, pp. 127–57.
- 'The degree of British commitment to the restoration of democracy in Spain, 1939–1947' in Christian Leitz and Joe Dunthorn (eds.), Spain in an International Context: Civil War, World War, Cold War, Oxford: Berghahn Press, 1999, pp. 191–217.
- 'Britain and the Angolan Revolt of 1961', Journal of Imperial and Commonwealth History, vol. xxvii, 1–1999, pp. 109–37.
- 'From entente to alliance: Anglo-French relations, 1935–1939' in Alan Sharp and Glyn Stone (eds.), Anglo-French Relations in the Twentieth Century: Rivalry and Cooperation, London: Routledge, 2000, pp. 180–204.
- 'Britain and Portuguese Africa, 1961–1965', Journal of Imperial and Commonwealth History, vol. xxviii, 2000, pp. 169–92.
- 'The British Government and the sale of arms to the lesser European powers, 1936–1939', Diplomacy and Statecraft, vol. xiv, 2003, pp. 237–70.
- 'Yvon Delbos and Anthony Eden: Anglo-French co-operation, 1936–1938', Diplomacy and Statecraft, vol. xvii, 2006, pp. 165–86.
- 'Britain and the provision of arms to Finland, 1936–1940' in Keith Hamilton and Edward Johnson (eds.), Arms and Disarmament in Diplomacy, London: Vallentine Mitchell, 2007, pp. 151–72

== Other positions ==
Stone is a founder member of the British International History Group (BIHG) under the auspices of the British International Studies Association (BISA) and a member for six years, between 1992 and 1998, of the editorial committee of the Association's journal the Review of International Studies, published by Cambridge University Press. In 1999 he became one of the founding editors of the electronic Journal of International History which published International History articles on the internet at the Institute of Historical Research website. Between 1998 and 2002, Glyn served on the British National Committee of the International Congress of Historical Sciences whose origins are French. In November 2005 he was elected to the Council of the Royal Historical Society and he is a member of the Peer Review College of the Arts and Humanities Research Council.

Stone is also a keen supporter of Bristol City F.C.
