= Vizela =

- Municipality
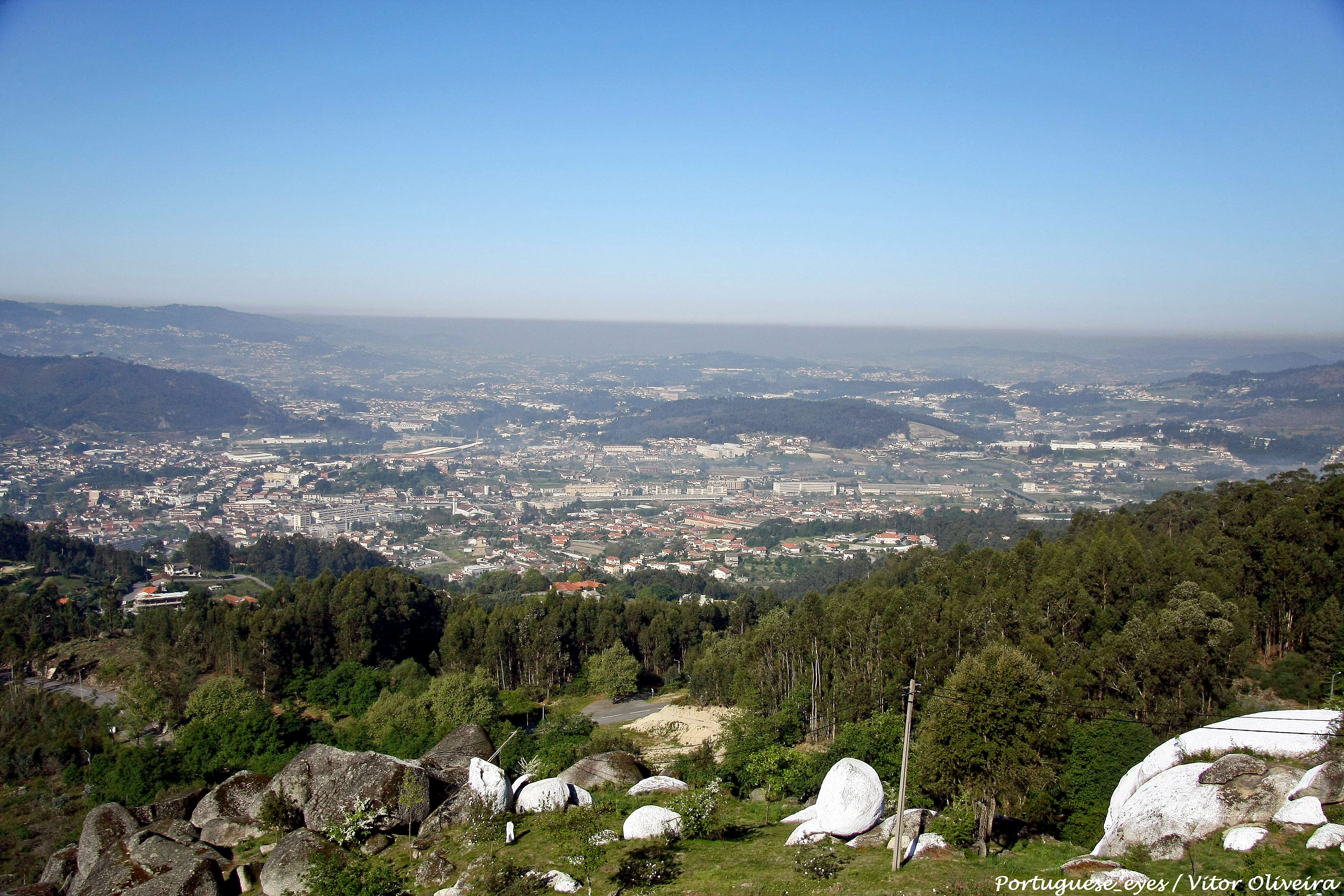
- Panorama of Vizela

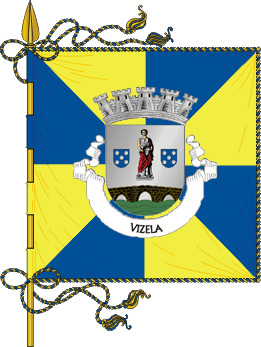
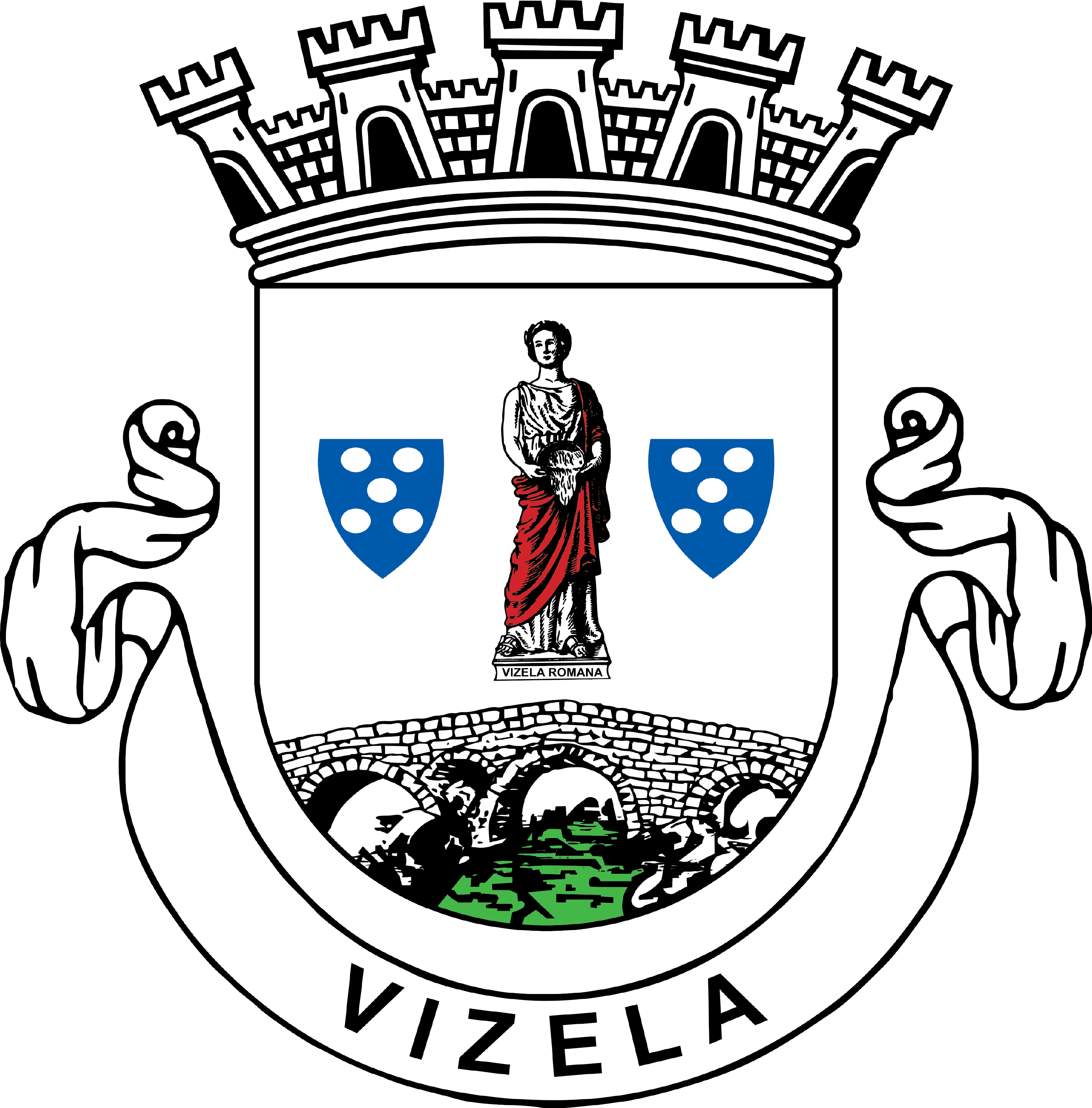
- Flag Coat of arms
- Interactive map of Vizela
- Coordinates: 41°22′N 8°16′W
- Country: Portugal
- Region: Norte
- Intermunic. comm.: Ave
- District: Braga
- Parishes: 5

Government
  - President: Vitor Hugo Salgado

Area
  - Total: 24.70 km^{2} (9.54 sq mi)

Population (2011)
  - Total: 23,736
  - Density: 961.0/km^{2} (2,489/sq mi)
- Time zone: UTC+00:00 (WET)
  - Summer (DST): UTC+01:00 (WEST)
- Website: cm-vizela.pt

Vizela (Portuguese pronunciation: [viˈzɛlɐ]) is a municipality in the Braga District in Portugal. The population in 2011 was 23,736, in an area of 24.70 km².

The present mayor is Vitor Hugo Salgado, elected as an independent. The municipal holiday is March 19.

== History ==
In August 2000, an outbreak of Legionnaires' disease occurred in Vizela. A total of 11 persons infected with Legionnaires' disease, all of them inhabitants of Vizela, were admitted to the Guimarães Hospital. There were no fatalities. All infectees had been in the main square of Vizela in the night of August 11–12, 2000, where the annual festivities of the municipality were being held. Investigators traced the source of the outbreak to a decorative fountain located in the square.

== Parishes ==
Administratively, the municipality is divided into 5 civil parishes (freguesias):

- Caldas de Vizela (São Miguel e São João)
- Infias
- Santa Eulália
- Santo Adrião de Vizela
- Tagilde e Vizela (São Paio)

== Sport ==
- Minigolf: Vizela has a miniature golf club association called Vizelgolfe equipped with two courses. In 2016 Vizela hosted the Minigolf European Championship and the Nations cup (Vizela Open 16). Vizelgolfe is a member of the Portuguese Minigolf Association.
- Football: Futebol Clube de Vizela is a professional football club based in the city.

== Notable people ==
- Gundisalvus of Amarante (1187–1259) a Catholic priest and a professed member from the Dominican Order of Preachers.
- João Pedro (born 1989) a former footballer with 195 club caps for F.C. Vizela.
- Carla Salomé Rocha (born 1990) a long-distance runner.

== Twin towns ==
- Zugló, Hungary, since 2009
