= Treaty of Windsor (1386) =

Anglo-Portuguese diplomatic alliance

Treaty of peace, friendship and confederation between John I of Portugal and Richard II, King of England
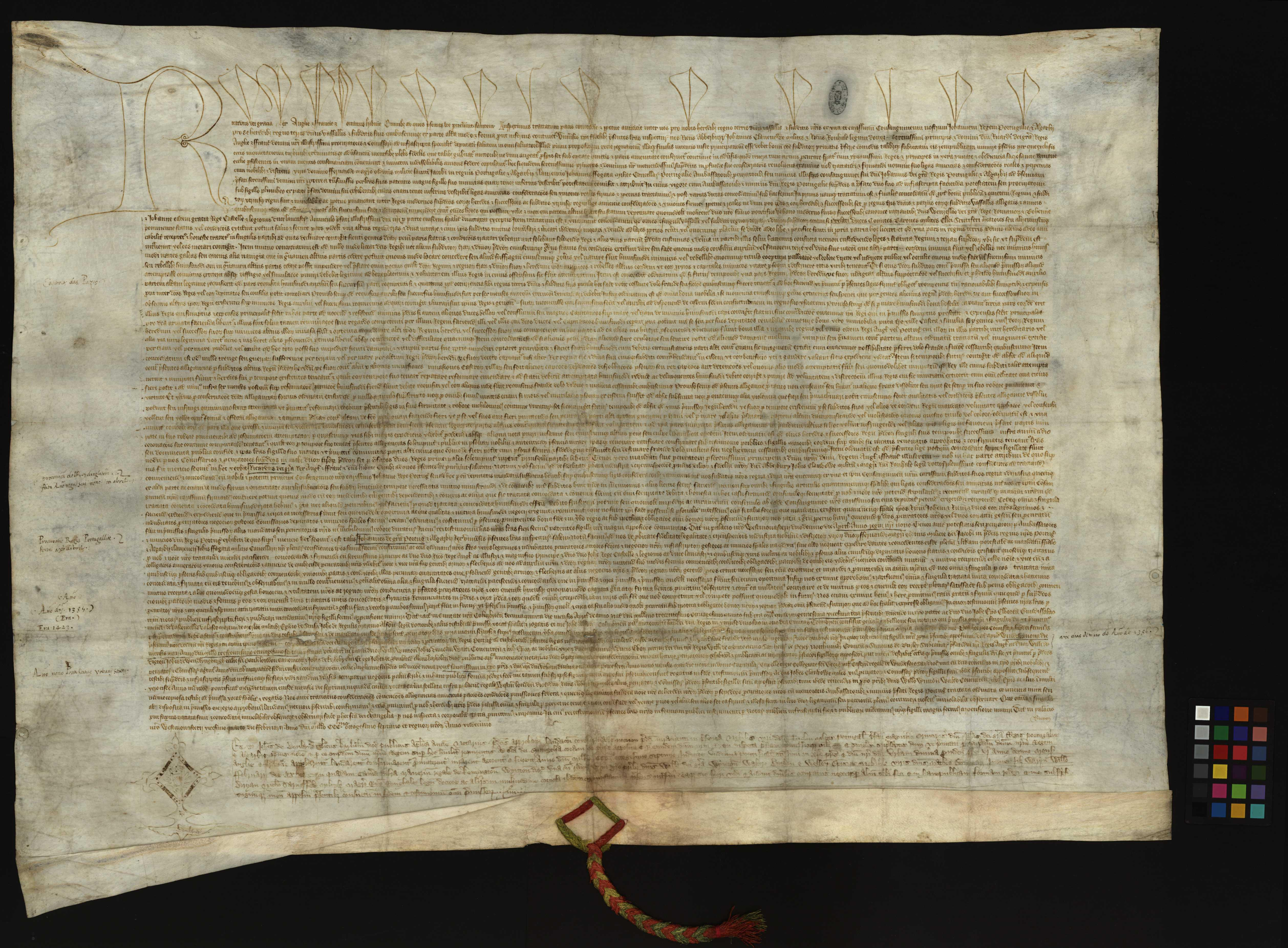
- The Treaty of Windsor in the Portuguese National Archives
- Drafted: 9 May 1386
- Signed: 24 February 1387
- Location: Westminster
- Negotiators: Fernando Afonso de Albuquerque; Lourenço João Fogaça; Richard d'Alberbury; John Clanowe; Richard Ronhale
- Signatories: Kingdom of England; Kingdom of Portugal
- Ratifiers: Richard II of England
- Depositary: Portuguese National Archives
- Language: Latin

Full text
- Treaty of Windsor (1386) at Wikisource

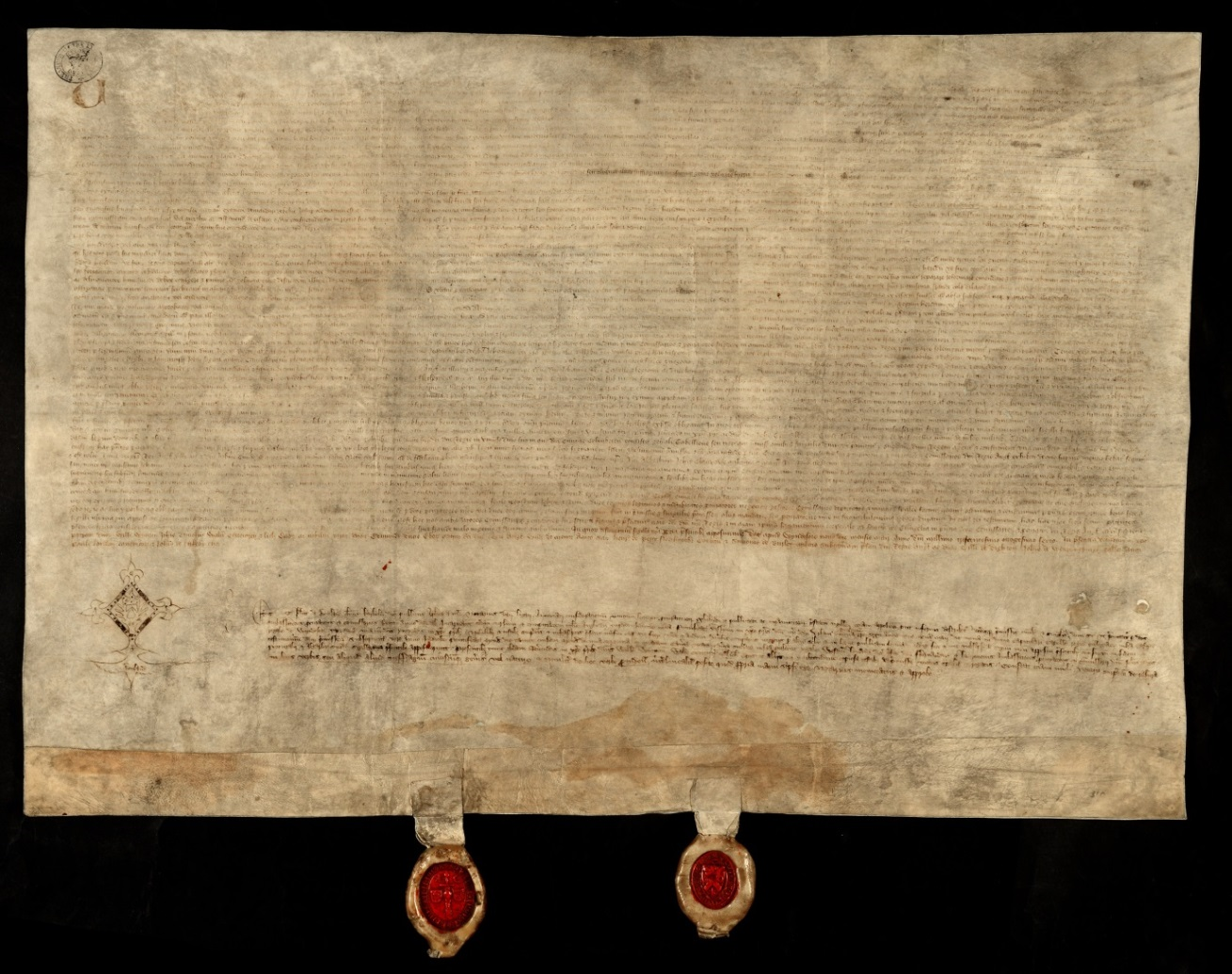
The Treaty in the National Archives, United Kingdom

The Treaty of Windsor is a diplomatic alliance signed between the Kingdom of Portugal and the Kingdom of England on 24 February 1387 in Windsor, Berkshire, and sealed by the marriage of King John I of Portugal (House of Aviz) to Philippa of Lancaster, daughter of John of Gaunt, 1st Duke of Lancaster. With the victory at the Battle of Aljubarrota, assisted by English archers, John I was recognised as the undisputed King of Portugal, putting an end to the interregnum of the 1383–1385 Crisis. The Treaty of Windsor established a pact of mutual support.

Copies are preserved at the Torre do Tombo National Archive in Lisbon and The National Archives in London.

Winston Churchill, speaking in the House of Commons in 1943, described the Anglo-Portuguese Alliance as "an alliance without parallel in world history." The historian Matthew Winslett says, "This treaty has been the cornerstone of both nations' relations with each other ever since." Still in effect today, it is the longest-lasting diplomatic treaty in recorded history.

== Background ==
The agreement followed the 1383-1385 Portuguese interregnum after King Ferdinand I died without leaving a male successor to the throne and only Princess Beatrice left from his marriage to Leonor Telles de Menezes. After the death, there were two candidates for succession to the throne.

- John I of Castile (acting upon Princess Beatrice).
- John of Aviz

After the battle of Aljubarrota, John of Aviz was crowned as John I of Portugal.

== See also ==
- Anglo-Portuguese Treaty of 1373
- British Ultimatum of 1890 – British diplomatic ultimatum to Portugal regarding Portugal's claims in Africa
- Timeline of Portuguese history
- Anglo-Portuguese Alliance – 1386 alliance between the UK and Portugal
- Treaty of Tagilde – Anglo-Portuguese treaty signed in 1372
- Operation Alacrity

== Bibliography ==
- Country profile of Portugal, Foreign, Commonwealth and Development Office website
- Livermore, H.V (1947). A History of Portugal. Cambridge University Press. p. 179.
- Winslett, Matthew (August 2008). The Nadir of Alliance: The British Ultimatum of 1890 and Its Place in Anglo-Portuguese Relations, 1147–1945 (PDF) (MA). Supervising Professor: Douglas Richmond. The University of Texas at Arlington. p. 14. Archived from the original on 17 September 2008.
