= Anglo-Portuguese Treaty of 1373 =

1373 Anglo-Portuguese treaty

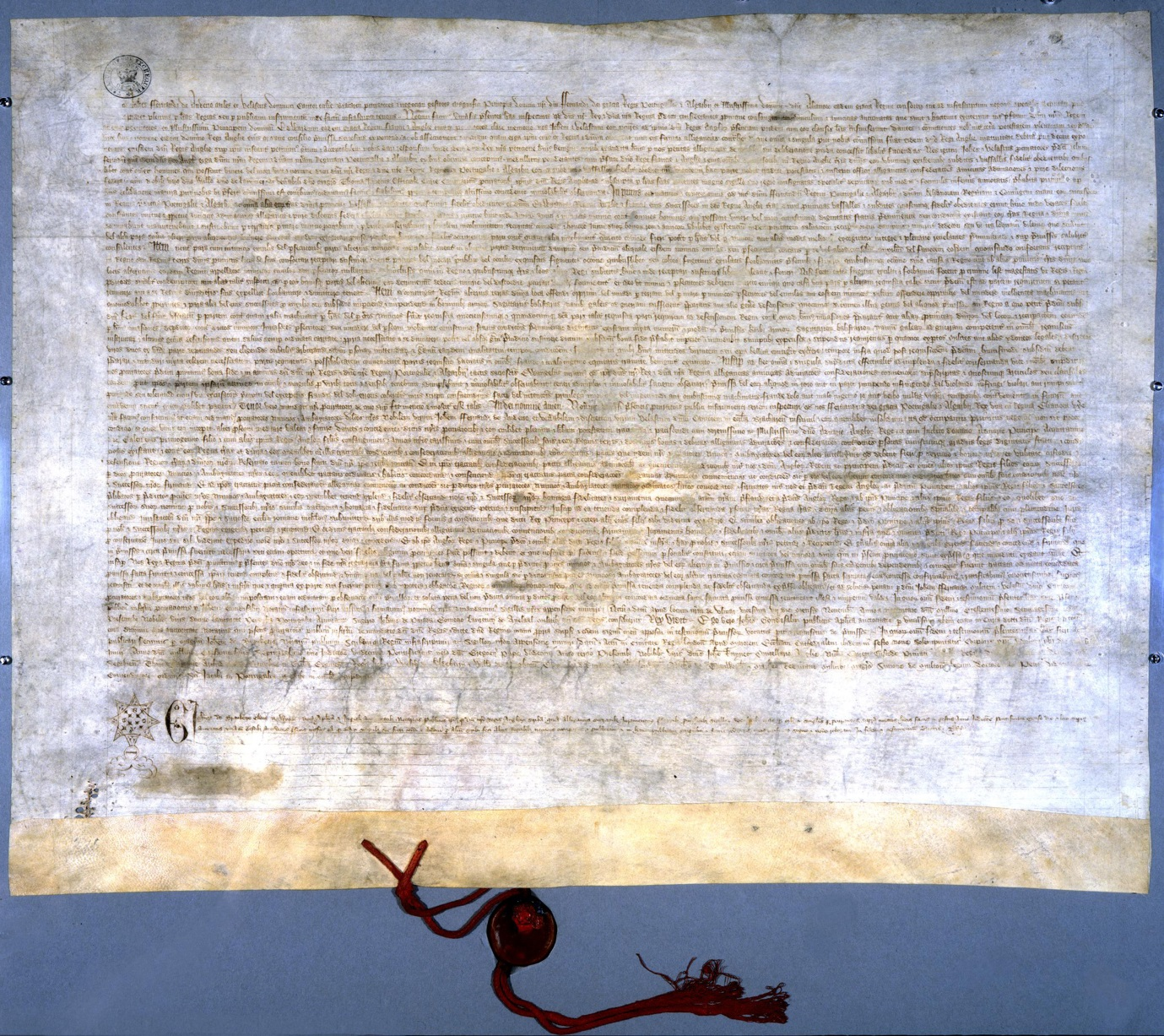
- Copy of the treaty held at The National Archives, UK
- Signed: 16 June 1373; 653 years ago
- Signatories: Kingdom of England; Kingdom of Portugal

Full text
- Treaty of Windsor (1373) at Wikisource

The Anglo-Portuguese Treaty of 1373 was signed on 16 June 1373 between King Edward III of England and King Ferdinand I and Queen Leonor of Portugal. It established a treaty of "perpetual friendships, unions [and] alliances" between the two seafaring states, and remains the longest-standing treaty still in effect today.

It was reinforced throughout history, including in 1386, 1643, 1654, 1660, 1661, 1703, 1815, and by a secret declaration in 1899. It was recognised in the Treaties of Arbitration in the 20th century between Britain and Portugal in 1904 and 1914.

The treaty was temporarily void during the Iberian Union from 1580 to 1640, when the monarchies of Spain and Portugal were in a dynastic union. However, with Portugal's restoration of independence, the alliance returned and came to a new height during the Napoleonic Wars when the British sent one of their most successful generals, the Duke of Wellington, to stop Napoleon's armies in the Peninsular War.

It was activated again during the Second World War, whereupon the Portuguese remained neutral, in agreement with Britain, which did not want to bring the war into the Iberian Peninsula. This lasted until 1943, when, after three months' negotiations, it was fully reactivated by the National Government of Winston Churchill and Portugal. Britain was accorded aerodrome and nautical facilities in the Portuguese Azores to help combat the U-boat threat. The British also cited the treaty during the 1982 Falklands War.

The 650th anniversary of the treaty was officially commemorated by the governments of both nations on 16 June 2023, and in acknowledgement that this represents "the world's longest diplomatic alliance".

== Text ==
The original text of the treaty is in the Latin language. A famous passage in the treaty assures that:

[t]here shall be between the respective kings and their successors, their realms, lands, dominions, provinces, vassals, and subjects whomsoever, faithfully obeying, true, faithful, constant, mutual, and perpetual friendships [Amicitae], unions [Adunationes], alliances [Alligantiae], and leagues of sincere affection [purae Dilectionis foedera]; and that, as true and faithful princes, they shall henceforth reciprocally be friends to friends and enemies to enemies, and shall assist, maintain, and uphold each other mutually, by sea and by land, against all men that may live or die of whatever degree, station, rank, or condition they may be, and against their lands, realms, and dominions.

== Second World War ==
In 1943, the Portuguese Government leased to Britain what became a major Allied air and naval base in the Portuguese islands, the Azores. Prime Minister Winston Churchill recounted reporting on the lease to the House of Commons:

"I have an announcement", I said, "to make to the House arising out of the treaty signed between this country and Portugal in the year 1373 between His Majesty King Edward III and King Ferdinand and Queen Eleanor of Portugal." I spoke in a level voice, and made a pause to allow the House to take in the date, 1373. As this soaked in there was something like a gasp. I do not suppose any such continuity of relations between two Powers has ever been, or will ever be, set forth in the ordinary day-to-day work of British diplomacy.

== See also ==
- Military alliance
- List of military alliances
- List of treaties
- Treaty of Windsor (1386)
- Anglo-Portuguese Alliance
- Anglo-Portuguese Treaty of 1878
- Treaty of Tagilde

== Sources ==
- "Closing the Ring", Churchill, Sir Winston Spencer, 1951.
