= German submarine U-108 =

U-108 may refer to one of the following German submarines:

- SM U-108, a Type U 93 submarine launched in 1917 that served in the First World War, and surrendered in 1918; became French submarine Léon Mignot
  - During the First World War, Germany also had this submarine with a similar name:
    - SM UB-108, a Type UB III submarine launched in 1917 and sunk in 1918
- German submarine U-108 (1940), a Type IXB submarine that served in the Second World War and was sunk in 1944
