= John of Gaunt's claims to the Castilian throne =

John of Gaunt claimed the throne of Castile through his marriage to Constance of Castile in 1371. This proved to be an important component in the second phase of the Hundred Years War.

== Aquitaine and Castile ==
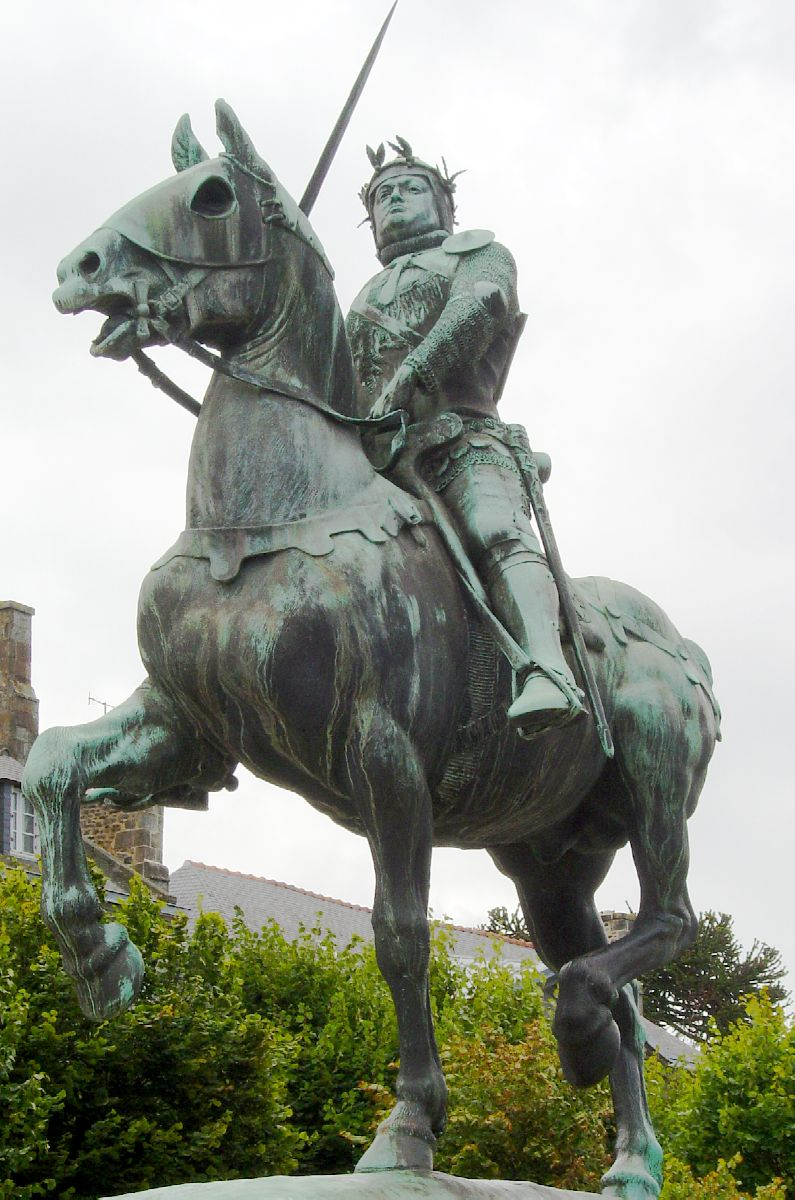
Statue of Bertrand du Guesclin in Dinan, Brittany

English interference in the Kingdom of Castile started in early 1366 after Pedro the Cruel was expelled as part of an ongoing civil war after his illegitimate half-brother Henry of Trastamare invaded with a French army of 12,000 men led by the prominent commander Bertrand du Guesclin. Pedro was welcomed in English controlled Bordeaux by Edward III's oldest son, Edward the Black Prince who was also Prince of Aquitaine and Gascony, and John of Gaunt was sent with English troops to support Pedro in 1367 with Anglo-Gascon forces winning the Battle of Nájera in April and restoring Pedro to his throne.

Pedro refused to honour his agreement to fund the English and so with the Black Prince suffering from ill health the English returned to Aquitaine. The attempt to raise money to pay off the debt within Aquitaine started a rebellion which drew in the French King and restarted the Hundred Years War keeping the Black Prince away from Castile. Henry of Trastámara used this opportunity to lead a second more successful invasion that ended with Pedro's death at the Battle of Montiel in March 1369 with Henry becoming Henry II of Castile and providing naval support to French campaigns against Aquitaine and England. In 1372, the Castilian fleet defeated the English fleet in the Battle of La Rochelle.

== Gaunt's marriage and claim ==
Pedro's elder daughter Constance now had a claim to the Castilan throne after her father's death. She took refuge in English controlled Bayonne. Gaunt married her in September 1371 in Roquefort, Landes with his brother Edmund marrying Contance's sister Isabella.

Gaunt assumed the claim officially from 29 January 1372 the title of King of Castile and León, and insisted his fellow English nobles henceforth address him as "my lord of Spain". He impaled his arms with the Arms of Castile and León. From 1372, John gathered around himself a small court of refugee Castilian knights and ladies and set up a Castilian chancery that prepared documents in his name according to the style of Peter of Castile, dated by the Castilian era and signed by himself with the Spanish formula "Yo El Rey" ("I, the King").

His claim to the Castilan throne strongly influenced Gaunt's views on foreign policy. In 1372 he planned to raise a force in Gascony and with the cooperation of either the Kings of Navarre, Aragon or Portugal to invade Castile although this proved to be stillborn as Gaunt and his forces were needed in Aquitaine after the loss of the defeat at La Rochelle. His claims influenced his 1373 chevauchée through France with pro-Gaunt agitation in Castilian towns such as Murcia and gaining the support Peter IV of Aragon, of Gaston III, Count of Foix and of Charles II of Navarre. He hatched several other schemes to make good his claim with an army, but for many years these were still-born owing to lack of finance or the conflicting claims of war in France or with Scotland.

== Way of Portugal ==
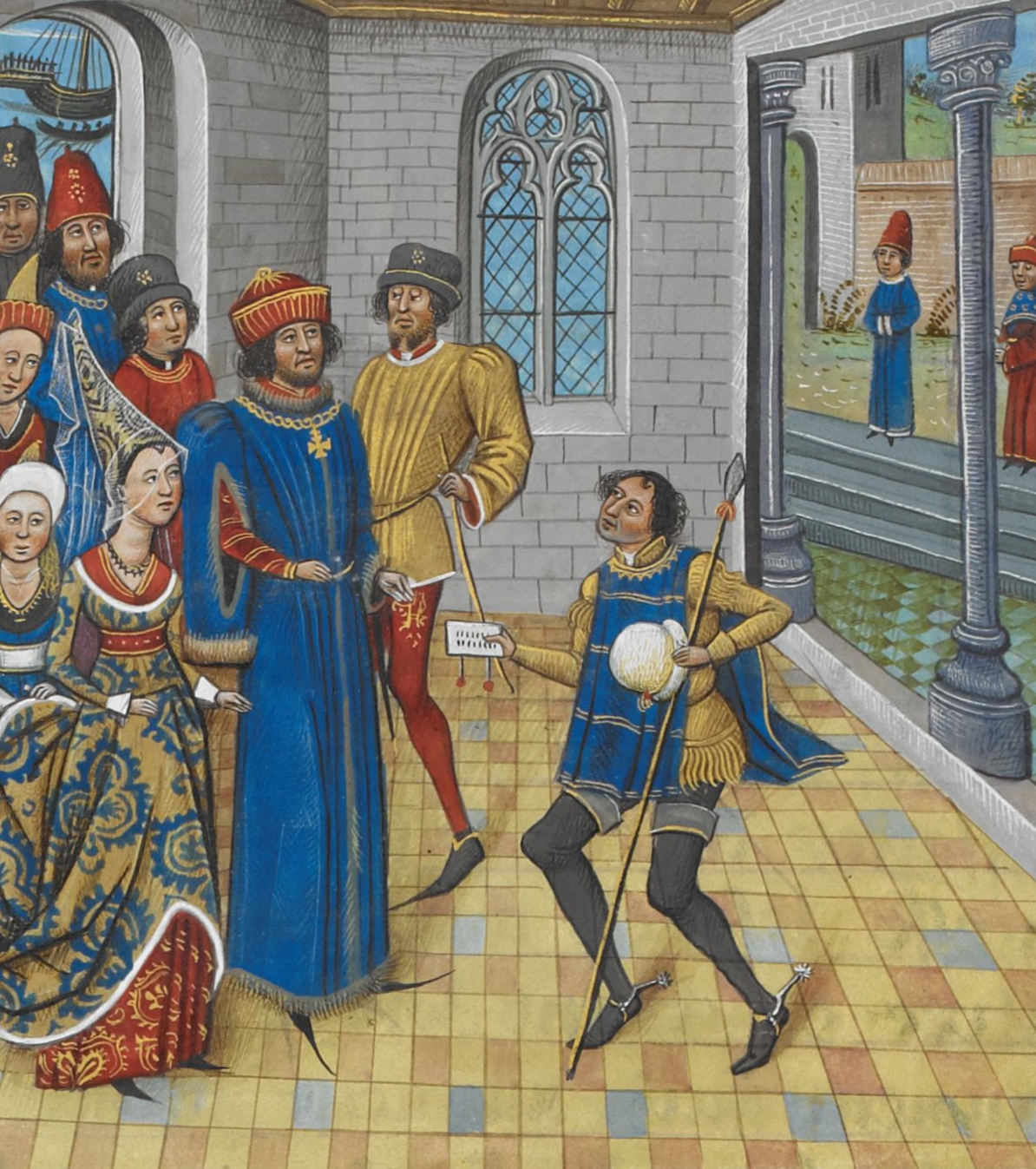
John of Gaunt, Duke of Lancaster, arrives at Galicia, and receives a letter from the King of Portugal, John I

It was only in 1386, after Portugal under its new King John I had entered into a full alliance with England, that he was actually able to land with an army in Spain and mount a campaign for the throne of Castile. Richard II of England was jealous of Gaunt's power and blessed the venture, investing Gaunt and Constance with crowns of gold before they left. John sailed from England on 9 July 1386 with a huge Anglo-Portuguese fleet carrying an army of about 5,000 men plus an extensive "royal" household and his wife and daughters. Pausing on the journey to use his army to drive off the French forces who were then besieging Brest, he landed at Corunna in the Kingdom of Galicia in August, the most distant and disaffected of Castile's kingdoms and wrong-footing the Castilians who had expected John to land in Portugal.

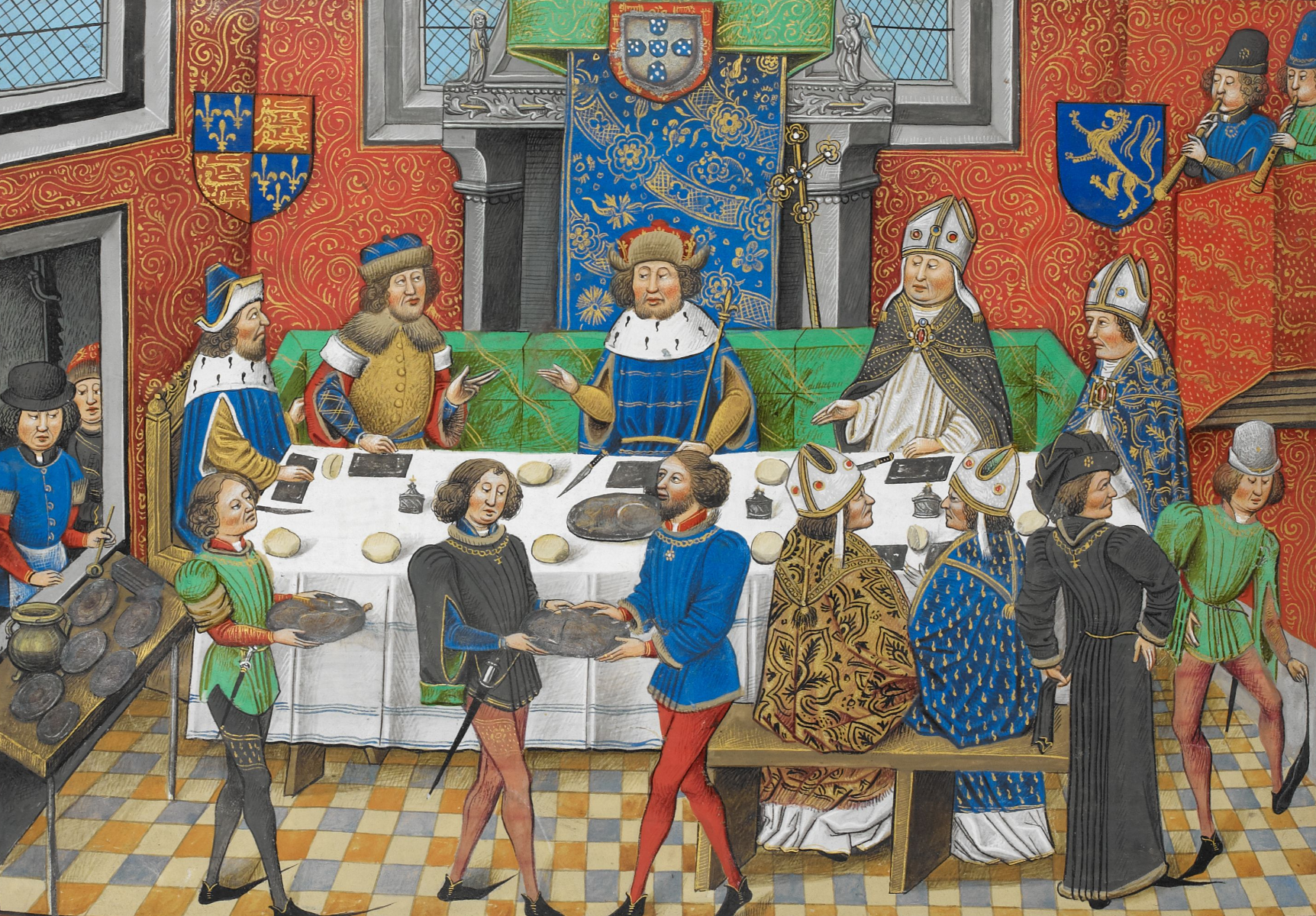
John of Gaunt dines with John I of Portugal, to discuss a joint Anglo-Portuguese invasion of Castile (from Jean de Wavrin's Chronique d'Angleterre)

From August to October, John of Gaunt set up a rudimentary court and chancery at Ourense and brought Galicia under his control received the submission of the Galician nobility and most of the towns of Galicia, though they made their homage to him conditional on his being recognised as king by the rest of Castile. While John of Gaunt had gambled on an early decisive battle, the Castilians were in no hurry to join battle, and he began to experience difficulties keeping his army together and paying them. In November, he met King John I of Portugal at Ponte do Mouro on the south side of the Minho river and concluded an agreement with him to make a joint Anglo-Portuguese invasion of central Castile early in 1387. The treaty was sealed by the marriage of John's eldest daughter Philippa to the Portuguese king. A large part of Gaunt's army succumbed to sickness, later including Gaunt himself, and when the invasion was mounted they were far outnumbered by their Portuguese allies.

The campaign of April–June 1387 was an ignominious failure. The Castilians refused to offer battle and the Galician-Anglo-Portuguese troops, apart from time-wasting sieges of fortified towns, were reduced to foraging for food in the arid Spanish landscape. They were harried mainly by French mercenaries of the Castilian king. Many hundreds of English, including close friends and retainers of John of Gaunt, died of disease or exhaustion. Many deserted or abandoned the army to ride north under French safe conducts. Shortly after the army returned to Portugal, John of Gaunt concluded a secret treaty with John of Trastámara under which he and his renounced all claim to the Castilian throne in favour of their daughter Catherine of Lancaster in return for a payment of 600,000 francs and an annual pension of 40,000 francs and the marriage of Catherine to John of Trastámara's son, Henry.

Gaunt returned to England in 1389 which allowed his nephew Richard II to reclaim personal control of his government from the Lords Appellant. He also switched to becoming an advocate of peace partly due to the fact it would cement his daughters' dynastic interests.

== Sources ==
- Curry, Anne (2002). The Hundred Years' War 1337–1453 (PDF). Essential Histories. Vol. 19. Oxford: Osprey Publishing. ISBN 978-1-8417-6269-2. Archived from the original (PDF) on 2018-09-27.
- Thompson, Edward Maunde (1892). "John of Gaunt" . Dictionary of National Biography. London: Smith, Elder & Co.
- Sumption, J. (19 March 2009). The Hundred Years War 3: Divided Houses. London: Faber & Faber. p. 274. ISBN 978-0-571-13897-5.
- Walker, Simon (2008) [2004]. "John [John of Gaunt], duke of Aquitaine and duke of Lancaster, styled king of Castile and León (1340–1399)". Oxford Dictionary of National Biography (online ed.). Oxford University Press. doi:10.1093/ref:odnb/14843. (Subscription, Wikipedia Library access or UK public library membership required.)
- Wagner, John A. (2006). Encyclopedia of the Hundred Years War (PDF). Westport, CT: Greenwood Press. ISBN 978-0-3133-2736-0. Archived from the original (PDF) on 16 July 2018.
