= Anglo-Portuguese Alliance =

1386 alliance between the UK and Portugal

Anglo-Portuguese relations
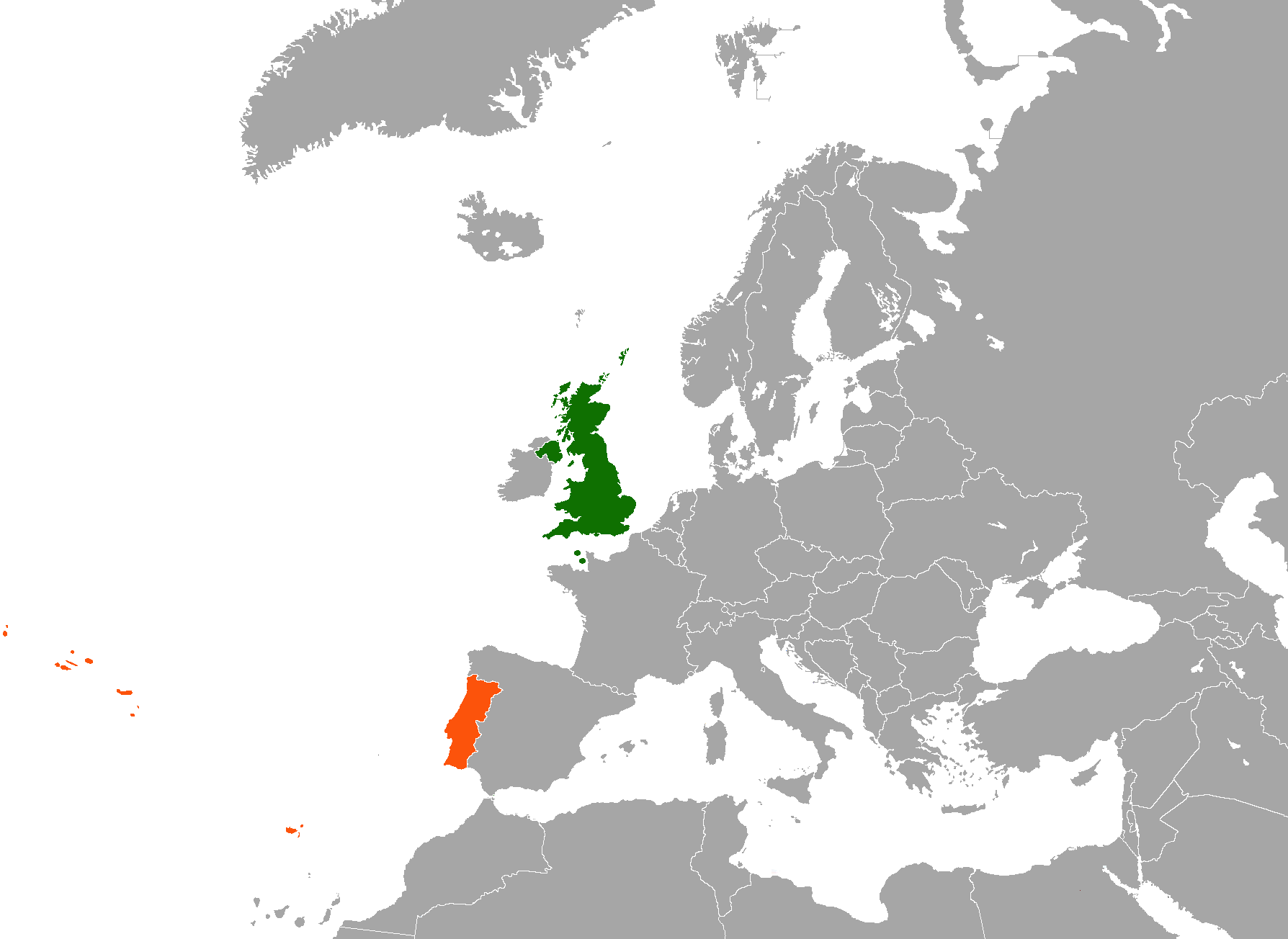

- United Kingdom: Portugal

The Anglo-Portuguese Alliance (Portuguese: Aliança Luso-Inglesa, "Luso-English Alliance") is the oldest alliance that is still in force by political bilateral agreement. It was established by the Treaty of Windsor in 1386, between the Kingdom of England (since succeeded by the United Kingdom) and the Kingdom of Portugal (now the Portuguese Republic). The countries were previously allied via the Anglo-Portuguese Treaty of 1373.

Since the signing of the Treaty of Windsor, the Kingdom of Portugal and the Kingdom of England, and later the modern Portuguese Republic and United Kingdom, have never waged war against each other, or participated in wars on opposite sides as independent states, with one brief exception as described below. While Portugal was subsumed under the Iberian Union, rebellious Portuguese factions and government in exile sought refuge and help in England. England spearheaded the Anglo-Spanish War (1585–1604) on the side of the deposed Portuguese royal house.

The alliance has served both countries throughout their respective military histories, influencing the participation of the United Kingdom in the Peninsular War, the UK's major land contribution to the Napoleonic Wars and the establishment of an Anglo-American base in Portugal. Portugal aided England, and later the UK, in times of need, for example, in the First World War. Today, Portugal and the United Kingdom are both part of NATO.

== Middle Ages ==
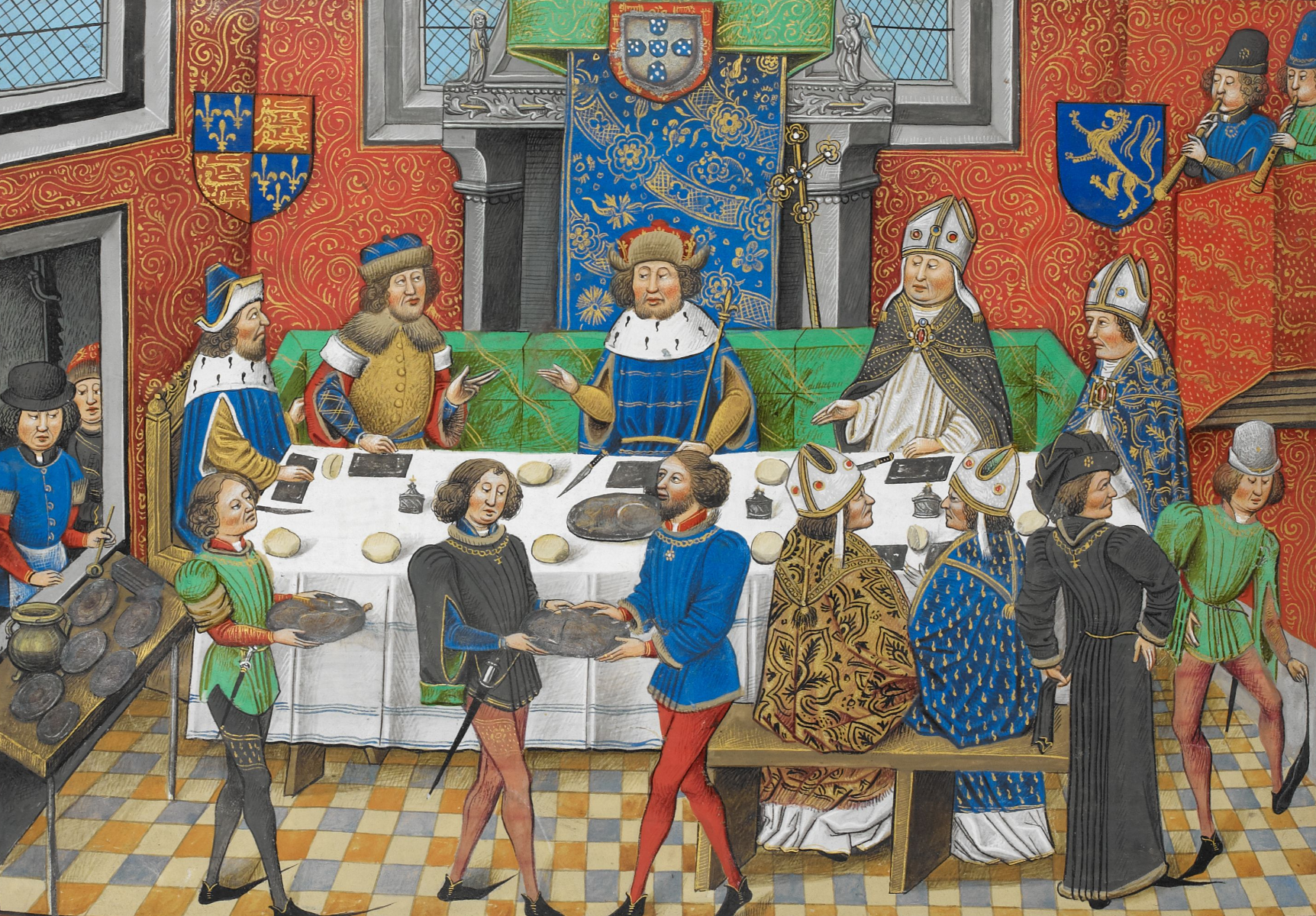
John of Gaunt being entertained by John I of Portugal.

English aid to the House of Aviz, which ruled Portugal from 1385 to 1580, set the stage for Portuguese cooperation with England that became a cornerstone of Portugal's foreign policy for more than five hundred years. English aid to Portugal went back much further to the 1147 Siege of Lisbon, when English and other northern European crusaders – en route to the Holy Land to participate in the Second Crusade – stopped and helped Portuguese King Afonso Henriques to conquer the city from the Moors.

In May 1386, the Treaty of Windsor sealed the alliance – first started in 1294, renewed in the Treaty of Tagilde in 1372 and the ensuing Anglo-Portuguese Treaty of 1373 and confirmed at the Battle of Aljubarrota (1385) – with a pact of perpetual friendship between the two countries. The most important part of the treaty stated that:

It is cordially agreed that if, in time to come, one of the kings or his heir shall need the support of the other, or his help, and in order to get such assistance applies to his ally in lawful manner, the ally shall be bound to give aid and succour to the other, so far as he is able (without any deceit, fraud, or pretence) to the extent required by the danger to his ally’s realms, lands, domains, and subjects; and he shall be firmly bound by these present alliances to do this.

In July 1386, John of Gaunt, Duke of Lancaster, son of the late king Edward III of England and father of the future King Henry IV of England, landed in Galicia with an expeditionary force to press his claim to the Crown of Castile with Portuguese aid. He failed to win the support of the Castilian nobility and returned to England with a cash compensation from the rival claimant.

John of Gaunt left behind his daughter, Philippa of Lancaster, to marry King John I of Portugal (February 1387) in order to seal the Anglo-Portuguese alliance. By this marriage, John I became the father of a generation of princes, called by the poet Luís de Camões the "Illustrious Generation", which led Portugal into its golden age, during the period of the Discoveries.

Philippa brought to the court the Anglo-Norman tradition of an aristocratic upbringing and gave her children good educations. Her personal qualities were of the highest standard, and she reformed the court and imposed rigid standards of moral behaviour. On the other hand, the more tolerant Portuguese aristocracy saw her methods as too traditional or outdated.

Philippa provided royal patronage for English commercial interests that sought to meet the Portuguese desire for cod and cloth in return for wine, cork, salt, and oil shipped through the English warehouses at Porto. Her eldest son, Duarte, authored moral works and became king in 1433. Pedro, who travelled widely and had an interest in history, became regent (1439–1448) after Duarte died of the plague in 1438. Ferdinand the Saint Prince (1402–1443), who became a crusader, participated in the attack on Tangiers in 1437. Henrique – also known as Prince Henry the Navigator (1394–1460) – became the master of the Order of Christ and the instigator and organiser of Portugal's early voyages of discovery.

== Disruption and renewal ==
The Iberian Union (1580–1640), a 60-year dynastic union between Portugal and Spain, interrupted the alliance when Spain's hostility to England dictated Portuguese foreign policy. As such, Philip II of Spain's struggle against Elizabeth I of England meant Portugal and England were on opposite sides during the Anglo-Spanish War (1585–1604) and the Dutch–Portuguese War (1598–1663). During this period, English privateers captured – especially in the South Atlantic around St Helena – 299 Portuguese Casa da Índia ships returning with Mughal wealth from the East Indies and captured the Portuguese garrison of Ormuz in Persia in 1622.

In 1640, England supported the Portuguese House of Braganza to take power in Portugal, replacing the House of Habsburg, ending the 60-year dynastic union between Portugal and Spain. England's support for Portugal during their Restoration War was confirmation of the renewal of the alliance. This was solidified further after the English Restoration and the marriage of Catherine of Braganza and Charles II of England. Portugal ceded Tangier and Bombay as part of the dowry. England, in addition to military support on the ground, would protect Portuguese shipments in the Mediterranean and the coasts of Lisbon and Porto.

Following the defeat of Spain in the war, England mediated the Treaty of Lisbon in 1668 which saw the independence of Portugal and the recognition of Pedro II as King. The English alliance was decisive in the consolidation of the independence of Portugal, and in Pedro's leadership. In return Portugal promised to transfer to the English the majority of the places recovered from the Dutch, to share in half the commerce of cinnamon and to install English families with the same privileges as Portuguese families in Goa, Cochin, Diu, Bahia, Pernambuco and Rio de Janeiro.

== 17th to 19th centuries ==
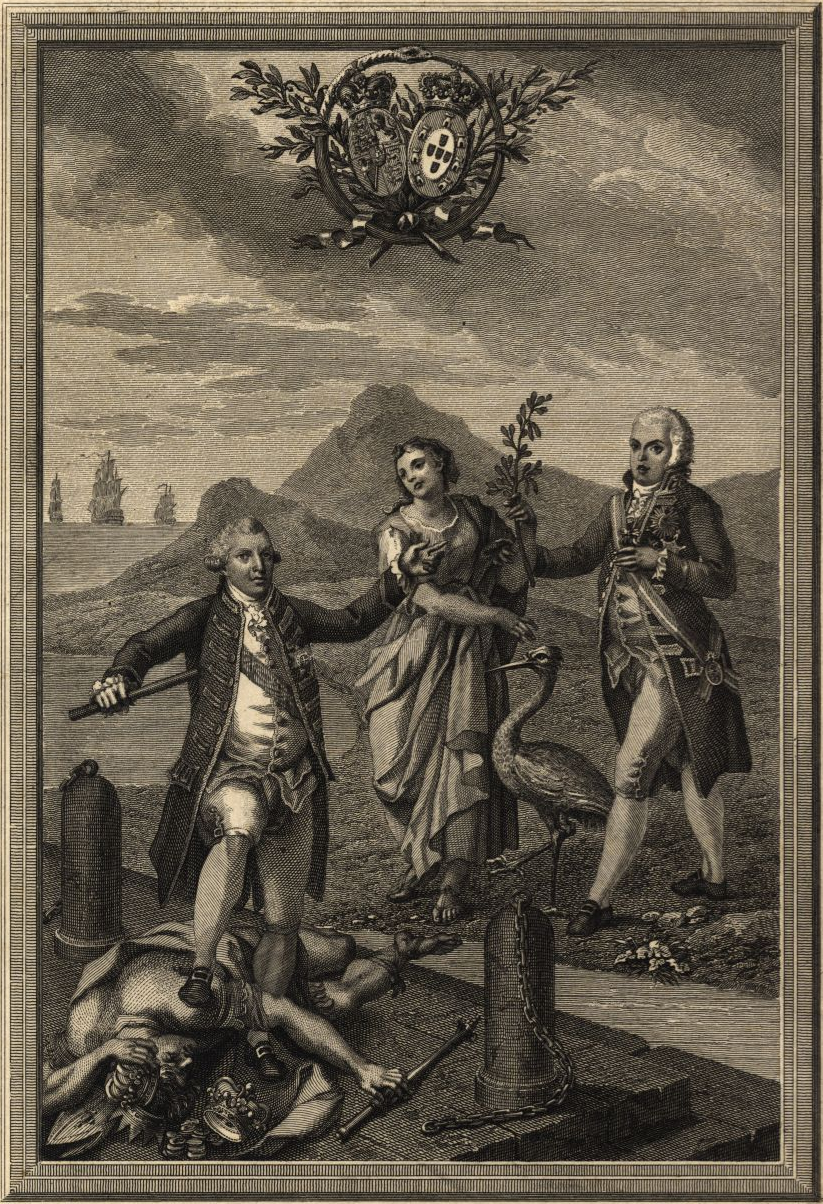
Allegory of George III of the United Kingdom and John VI of Portugal, by Joaquim Carneiro da Silva, 1810. It is accompanied by a poem: "Immortal trophies George's throne surround: Here Envy crush'd, and there Ambition bound Braganza's line by Gratitude combin'd Clears fast to Brunswick's ever closely twin'd."

The alliance was reconfirmed after the breakup of the Iberian Union, primarily due to both countries' respective rivalries with Spain, the Netherlands, and France, both in Europe and overseas. During this time, important episodes in the alliance were:

- The War of the Spanish Succession (1701–1714), when Portugal together with the Duchy of Savoy initially sided with France, but after the Battle of Blenheim reunited with its ally.
- The Seven Years' War (1756–1763), when Spain invaded Portugal in 1762. Britain intervened as Portugal's ally. Although faced with vastly superior numbers, the Portuguese and British forces together with Portuguese militia and peasants defeated the Spanish and French forces, which suffered huge losses during their three invasion attempts.
- The Napoleonic Wars (1803–1815), when Portugal, isolated in a Europe wholly dominated by Napoleon, continued to trade with the United Kingdom despite French restrictions and was invaded, but with British help regained total sovereignty and independence. The Portuguese royal family at the time, including Prince John, at the time acting as regent for his mother, the aged and mentally impaired Queen Maria I, took refuge in its then vice-royalty of Brazil, under escort by the British fleet. The Portuguese also helped the failed British invasions of the River Plate.
- The Portuguese Civil War (1828–1834), when the United Kingdom gave important support to the Liberal faction.
- The 1890 British Ultimatum, where under pressure by Cecil Rhodes, the British government gave an ultimatum to the Portuguese government to withdraw from the region of modern-day Botswana and refrain from furthering their colony of Portuguese East Africa. This was done in response to an expedition by Serpa Pinto into the region. The 1890 ultimatum was said to be one of the main causes for the Republican Revolution, which ended the monarchy in Portugal 20 years later.

== 20th century ==
During the 20th century, the treaty was invoked several times:

=== First World War ===
- After German incursions in Portuguese East Africa (today Mozambique), Portuguese troops fought on the Western Front alongside Allied soldiers during the First World War.

=== Interwar ===
- Portugal provided assistance to the Spanish Nationalists, Fascist Italy, and Nazi Germany during the Spanish Civil War, while the United Kingdom pursued non-intervention and neutrality.

By 1927, the British Government had begun to wonder whether the alliance, which had stood for more than 550 years, was still of value. There were calls from inside the government that recent Portuguese actions had failed to live up to their obligations, particularly in light of the Portuguese government's regular calls for British support. Foreign Secretary Sir Austen Chamberlain had the matter investigated. His department reported that the alliance cost very little to maintain, and that Britain was usually able to rely on Portuguese support in matters where the Portuguese had no interests of their own. The Admiralty contributed to the study, reporting that the key value of the alliance was to deny the use of a range of Portuguese islands in the Atlantic Ocean that could be used to threaten Britain to other powers in time of war.

The Foreign Office's legal department also offered advice that, as the alliance was so old, it lacked any mechanism for dissolution. Phrases in treaties like "perpetual alliance" and "lasting forever inviolate" were, in the medieval period, fairly common and able to be disclaimed in times of war with little consequence. However, they were concerned that if the British sought to abrogate the alliance then the Portuguese would demand arbitration through the mechanisms of 20th-century diplomacy. As there were a raft of recent agreements between the countries, they advised that the British case to end the alliance would be exceedingly weak. Following this confidential review, Britain maintained the alliance.

=== Second World War ===
Upon the declaration of war in September 1939, the Portuguese government announced that the Anglo-Portuguese Alliance remained intact, but since the British did not seek Portuguese assistance, Portugal would remain neutral. In an aide-mémoire of 5 September 1939, the British government confirmed the understanding. British strategists regarded Portuguese non-belligerency as "essential to keep Spain from entering the war on the side of the Axis." British Prime Minister Winston Churchill wrote to his Portuguese counterpart, António de Oliveira Salazar in September 1940, congratulating him on his ability to keep Portugal out of the war, asserting that "as so often before during the many centuries of the Anglo-Portuguese alliance, British and Portuguese interests are identical on this vital question".

The British Ambassador in Madrid from 1940 to 1944, Samuel Hoare, 1st Viscount Templewood, recognised Salazar's crucial role in keeping Iberia neutral during the war. Lord Templewood asserted that in his thirty years of political life he had met most of the leading statesmen of Europe and that he placed Salazar very high on the list of those who impressed him. He stated that Salazar "being a man of one idea – the good of his country – he was convinced that the slightest step from the narrow path of neutrality would endanger the work of national regeneration to which he had devoted the whole of his public life". He reported to the British Government that "Salazar detested Hitler", that the Portuguese régime differed fundamentally from Nazism and Fascism, and that Salazar never left a doubt in his mind that he desired a Nazi defeat.

Salazar steered Portugal down a middle path during the war, but nevertheless provided aid to the Allies. In July 1940, the Anglo-Portuguese Alliance gave him the cover to allow the Portuguese island of Madeira to be used to help the Allies evacuate around 2,500 people from Gibraltar.

As the war progressed, the importance of Portugal's island territories in the Atlantic increased, particularly after the United States entered the war. The Azores, a Portuguese territory, was a vital naval base and its airstrips were within bombing range of the Americas. They were a vital node for transatlantic communications cables as well. This led American war planners to develop Operation Alacrity to invade the islands, but the British successfully convinced their new allies to rely on the medieval treaty.

The British Ambassador in Lisbon, Sir Ronald Campbell, wrote in 1943 (paraphrasing Salazar) that "strict neutrality was the price the allies paid for strategic benefits accruing from Portugal's neutrality and that if her neutrality instead of being strict had been more benevolent in our favour Spain would inevitably have thrown herself body and soul into the arms of Germany. If this had happened the Peninsula would have been occupied and then North Africa, with the result that the whole course of the war would have been altered to the advantage of the Axis." Campbell also stated that "he [Salazar] would answer the call if it were made on grounds of dire necessity"

When the war continued into 1943, US President Franklin Roosevelt was able to convince Winston Churchill that the islands would have to be invaded. Sir Anthony Eden and Clement Attlee, the Secretaries of State for Foreign and Dominion Affairs suggested instead invoking the Treaty of Windsor to request access to the Portuguese military facilities within the islands. Salazar responded favourably and virtually at once: Portugal granted naval bases on Portuguese territory to Britain, in keeping with the traditional Anglo-Portuguese Alliance, letting them use the Azorean ports of Horta (on the island of Faial) and Ponta Delgada (on the island of São Miguel), and the airfields of Lajes Field (on Terceira Island) and Santana Field (on São Miguel Island).

The British gained access to the islands in November 1943, and were able to quietly allow US access under the "friend to all friends" provision of the treaty. From the Lajes Base in the Azores, 8,689 US aircraft departed including 1,200 B-17 and B-24 bomber aircraft which were ferried across the Atlantic. Cargo aircraft carried vital personnel and equipment to North Africa, to the United Kingdom and – after the Allies gained a foothold in Western Europe – to Orly Field near Paris by the end of the war.

Flights returning from Europe carried wounded servicemen. Medical personnel at Lajes, Azores, handled approximately 30,000 air evacuations en route to the United States for medical care and rehabilitation. By using Lajes Field, it was possible to reduce flying time between the United States and North Africa from 70 hours to 40. This considerable reduction in flying hours enabled aircraft to make almost twice as many crossings per month between the United States and North Africa and clearly demonstrated the geographic value of the Azores during the war.

=== Postwar ===
- Portugal and the United Kingdom were two of the founding members of NATO, in 1949.
- The establishment of the European Free Trade Association (EFTA) took place in 1960 following the establishment of the European Economic Community (EEC) in 1957. Portugal and the UK were two of the seven founding members of EFTA. In 1973 the UK left EFTA to join the EEC along with Denmark and Ireland. Portugal did the same in 1986 along with Spain.
- During the 1982 Falklands War, the facilities of the Azores were again offered to the Royal Navy.

== 21st century ==
On 13 June 2022, the Prime Minister of Portugal and the Prime Minister of the United Kingdom signed a new agreement between the two nations in London, known as the UK-Portugal Joint Declaration on Bilateral Cooperation, thereby reinforcing the Anglo-Portuguese Alliance and confirming its status as the longest-running alliance still in force. The Joint Declaration was also signed to celebrate the 650th anniversary of the Treaty of Tagilde.

The 650th anniversary of the Anglo-Portuguese Treaty of 1373 was officially commemorated by both nations on 16 June 2023. The British government stated at this time that they intend to enter into "a new bilateral Defence Agreement, due to be signed later in the year, set to take our defence cooperation to the next level."

Both countries continue to be members of the wider military alliance, NATO.

== See also ==
- Portugal–United Kingdom relations
- Anglo-Portuguese Treaty of 1878
- Dutch–Portuguese War
- Anglo-Dutch Wars
- Operation Alacrity
- Auld Alliance (an alliance between Scotland and France made in 1295)
- Western European Time (time zone shared by the United Kingdom, Ireland and Portugal)

== General and cited sources ==
- Country profile of Portugal, Foreign and Commonwealth Office website
- Hoare, Samuel (1946). Ambassador on Special Mission (1st ed.). UK: Collins. pp. 124 and 125.
- Kay, Hugh (1970). Salazar and Modern Portugal. New York: Hawthorn Books.
- Leite, Joaquim da Costa (1998). "Neutrality by Agreement: Portugal and the British Alliance in World War II". American University International Law Review. 14 (1). Washington College of Law: 185–199.
- Meneses, Filipe (2009). Salazar: A Political Biography (1st ed.). Enigma Books. p. 544. ISBN 978-1929631902.
- Stone, Glyn (1994). The Oldest Ally: Britain and the Portuguese Connection, 1936–1941. Boydell & Brewer Ltd. p. 228. ISBN 9780861932276.

Attribution
