= Infantes of Aragon =

Term for the sons of King Ferdinand I of Aragon

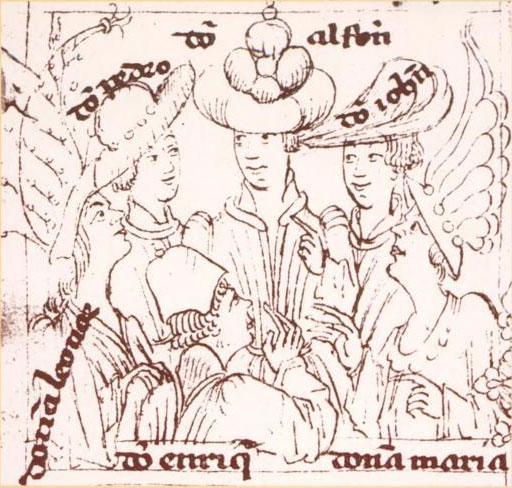
The Infantes of Aragon (clockwise from top): Alfonso, Juan, Maria, Enrique, Leonor, Pedro.

The Infantes of Aragon (Spanish: Los Infantes de Aragón) is an appellation commonly used by Spanish historians to refer to a group of 15th-century infantes (princes) of the House of Trastámara, specifically the sons of King Ferdinand I of Aragon and his wife Eleanor of Alburquerque:

- Infante Alfonso (1396–1458) – became Alfonso V of Aragon (f. 1416), also king of Sicily and Naples (f.1442)
- Infanta Maria (1396–1445) – Maria of Aragon, first wife of John II of Castile (m.1420)
- Infante Juan (1398–1479) – King of Navarre (f.1425), later King John II of Aragon (f.1458).
- Infante Enrique (1400–1445) – Henry of Aragon, Duke of Villena, Count of Albuquerque, Count of Empúries and Grand Master of the Order of Santiago (f.1409)
- Infanta Leonor (1402–1445) – Eleanor of Aragon (Queen of Portugal), consort of Edward I of Portugal (m.1428)
- Infante Pedro (1406–1438) – Peter of Aragon, Count of Alburquerque and Duke of Noto
- Infante Sancho (1410–1416) – infant master of the Order of Alcántara, died in childhood

== History ==
The death of King Henry III of Castile in 1406 left the Crown of Castile in the hand of an infant son, John II of Castile. In his will, Henry III had appointed his brother Infante Ferdinand of Antequera as regent for the young king. Ferdinand used the position to secure advancement for his own children. After the death of the childless king Martin of Aragon in 1410 left the Crown of Aragon without heirs, the estates, by the Compromise of Caspe in 1412, elected the Castilian prince Ferdinand of Antequera as King Ferdinand I of Aragon, Valencia and Barcelona.

After Ferdinand's premature death in 1416, he was succeeded by his eldest son as Alfonso V of Aragon. But the ambitious younger sons, particularly the Infantes John and Henry – the 'Infantes of Aragon' – were already entrenched with vast estates in Castile and sought to dominate political life during the reign of their impressionable cousin, king John II of Castile. In July 1420, Infante Henry engineered a coup in Tordesillas, dispossessed opposing nobles and seized effective control of Castilian government. In November of that year, the Infantes arranged the marriage of their sister Maria of Aragon to John II of Castile, thus consolidating their power (they also arranged the reciprocal marriage of John II's sister Maria of Castile to their eldest brother Alfonso V).

But John II of Castile turned to Castilian grandee Álvaro de Luna, soon made Constable of Castile, to engineer a counter-coup and force Infante Henry into exile in Aragon. But by 1427, Álvaro de Luna had fallen out of the king's favor, and Infante Henry returned to Castile and recovered much of his old powers.

In 1425, Infante John married Blanche I of Navarre, and became consort-King of Navarre. Their younger sister Eleanor, was married to King Edward of Portugal in 1428. The Trastamara brood had a hand in every Iberian kingdom, in addition to their extensive estates within Castile itself.

The position of the 'Infantes of Aragon' seemed unassailable. But John II of Castile turned to the constable Álvaro de Luna once again to dislodge them. The Infantes had the support of the high Castilian nobility, and, of course, Aragon and Navarre, but the Constable knit a coalition of smaller nobles and burghers against them. The protracted political and military struggles between Álvaro de Luna and the Infantes of Aragon, with its series of successes and reverses, characterized much of John II's reign.

The Infantes were finally defeated at the First Battle of Olmedo in 1445, where Infante Henry died from his wounds. Álvaro de Luna enjoyed a brief period of dominance, until 1454, when John II's second wife, Isabella of Portugal, secured his dismissal.

The eldest Trastamara brother, Alfonso V of Aragon, died in 1458, and was succeeded by his younger brother Infante John of Navarre, who ascended as King John II of Aragon.

John II (of Aragon) died in 1479. His son Ferdinand II of Aragon married John II (of Castille)'s daughter Isabella I of Castile, ushering in (with some difficulty) the reign of the Catholic Monarchs of Spain.

== See also ==
- Castilian Civil War of 1437–1445

== Sources ==
- McKaye, A. "Infantes of Aragon", in E.M. Gerli, editor, 2003, Medieval Iberia: an encyclopedia, London: Routledge
