= Infanta Leonor =

Infanta Leonor may refer to:

== Castile ==
- Eleanor of Castile (died 1244), Queen of Aragon
- Leonor Rodríguez de Castro (died after 1275), infanta as the wife of Infante Philip of Castile
- Eleanor of Castile (1307–1359), Queen of Aragon
- Eleanor of Castile, Queen of Navarre (died 1415/1416)
- Eleanor, Princess of Asturias (1423–1425)
- Eleanor of Castile (1241–1290), Queen of England

== Aragon ==
- Eleanor of Aragon, Countess of Toulouse (1182–1226)
- Eleanor of Aragon, Queen of Castile (1358–1382)
- Eleanor of Aragon, Queen of Portugal (c.1405–1445)

== Navarre ==
- Eleanor of Navarre (1426–1479), Queen of Navarre

== Spain ==
- Eleanor of Austria (1498–1558), Queen of Portugal and France
- Leonor, Princess of Asturias (born 2005)

== Portugal ==
- Eleanor of Portugal, Queen of Denmark (c.1211–1231)
- Eleanor of Portugal, Holy Roman Empress (1434–1467)
- Eleanor of Viseu (1458–1525), Queen of Portugal

== See also ==
- Leonor
- Eleanor of Castile (disambiguation)
- Eleanor of Aragon (disambiguation)
- Eleanor of Portugal (disambiguation)
