= Order of the Jar =

Aragonese chivalric order

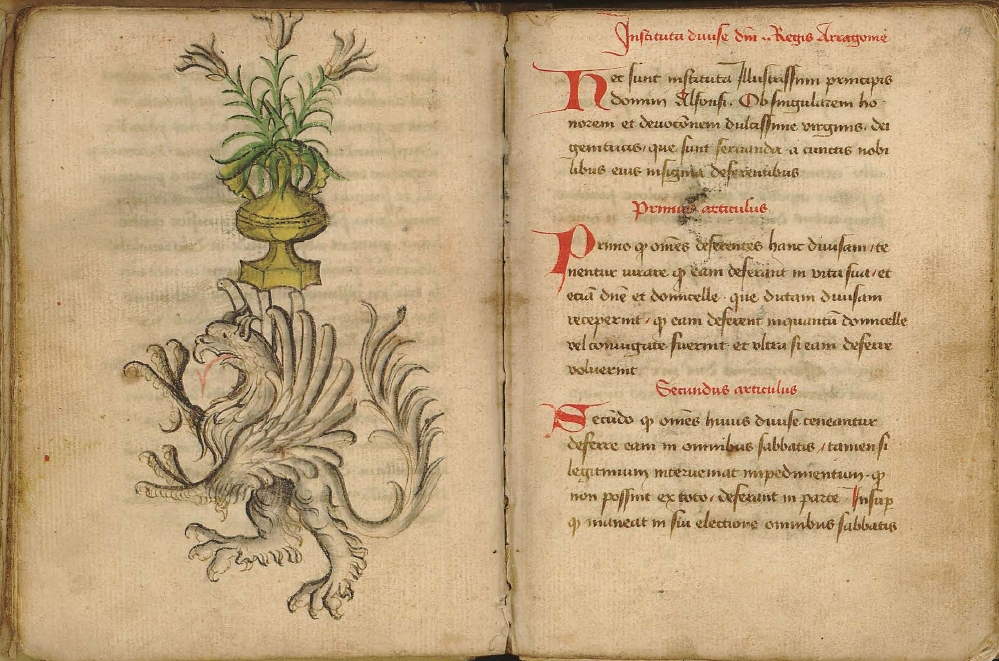
Golden jar of lilies with a griffin, the device of the order from the armorial of Hendrik van Heessel.

The Order of the Jar (Spanish: Orden de la Jarra, German: Kannenorden) was a chivalric order founded by Ferdinand of Antequera in 1403. After Ferdinand became King of Aragon in 1412, it became a royal order and lasted until 1516.

== Names ==
The Order is known by many names:

- Orden de la Jarra de la Salutación (Order of the Jar of the Salutation)
- Orden de las Jarras de Santa María y Grifo (Order of the Jars of Saint Mary and the Griffin)
- Orden de la Jarra y el Grifo (Order of the Jar and the Griffin)
- Orden de la Jarra y Estola (Order of the Vase and Stole)
- Orden de la Stola et Jarra (Order of the Stole and Jar)
- Orden de la Azucena (Order of the Lily)
- Orden de la Terraza (Order of the Jar)
- Orden del Grifo (Order of the Griffin)

== Origin legend ==
The legend of the origins of the Order of the Jar may date back to its actual founding in 1403. Ferdinand, in order not to be seen as treading on the authority of his brother, King Henry III of Castile, may have sought to ground his order in an older (and foreign) foundation. Thus, according to legend, the Order of the Jar was one of the oldest military orders in Europe, having been founded in the Kingdom of Navarre in the 11th century.

There are several versions of the Navarrese legend. According to one, the order was founded by Sancho III the Great in 1023. In another, it was Sancho IV (reigned 1054–1076). In the most elaborate version, it was García III on 25 March 1043. He was hunting with his falcon, which was chasing a pigeon. Both birds stood at the entrance to a cave in Nájera, inside of which there was an image of the Virgin Mary next to a jar of lilies, symbol of the Annunciation. García decided to build a monastery near the cave, which became Santa María la Real of Nájera, and at the same time create the Orden de la Terraza, the latter being an archaic word for jar.

The 19th-century historian Vicente de la Fuente believed the order could be traced back to Sancho VII's reform of an Order of the Lilies (Orden de los Lirios) in 1223.

== Foundation ==
On 15 August 1403, while celebrating the Feast of the Annunciation in Medina del Campo, Ferdinand conferred the collar of a new order of chivalry on his sons Alfonso, John, Henry, Sancho and Peter.

... to the infante Don Alonso that after of his father was king of Aragon..., secondly he gave it to the infante Don John, who was king of Navarre for his wife Doña Blanca, and also King of Aragon after the death of his brother Don Alonso, and thirdly he gave it to the infante Don Henry, Grand Master of the Order of Santiago, fourthly to the infante Don Sancho, who was Master of the Order of Calatrava, and Don Peter... fifth, and in honouring to his children with the motto enlightened of the Virgin, he was giving his order to his many favorite knights

The device of the order was a chain bearing a jar of lilies, symbolizing the purity of the Virgin, which was already a common symbol of the Annunciation; an effigy of Virgin and Christ child; and a griffin, which should probably be read as symbol of war against the infidel. Members also wore a white stole. The statutes of the order appear to have been given on the occasion of its founding. They survive in a manuscript in the Escorial and have been published as Reglas y Divisa de la Orden Militar de la Jarra. Their explanation of the symbolism of the device is:

... to the honour and reverence of the Virgin St Mary, and in recognition of the pleasure which she received when the angel saluted her, I have taken as a device a collar of the Jar of the Salutation, from which collar descends a griffin suspended, in signification that even as the griffin is strong among all the animals, so all those of this Device must be strong and firm in the love of God and of the Virgin St Mary.

== Royal order ==
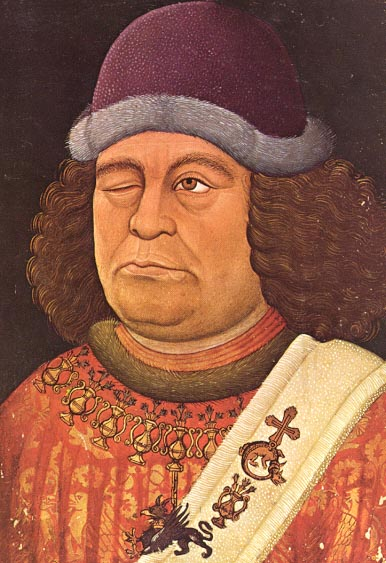
Portrait of Oswald von Wolkenstein in a manuscript from 1432, with the emblem of the Order of the Jar on his bend and hanging from his collar, while the chain and the cross-and-dragon on the bend symbolise the Order of the Dragon

After Ferdinand took over the Crown of Aragon, the Order of the Jar became in effect the royal order of his kingdoms, including Aragon, Sicily and after 1443 Naples. It is unclear if the order was ever formally attached to these realms in law. It probably remained the personal property of the royal house. It remained vestigial in comparison to other royal orders, but played a prominent role in court ceremony. The eyewitness Álvar García de Santa María records its central place at the coronation of Ferdinand in Zaragoza in 1414.

After the siege of Balaguer (1413), Ferdinand I of Aragon honoured about eighty of the knights who had shown greater courage in battle with the shield of the order.

In 1413, Ferdinand empowered King Sigismund of Germany to confer membership in the order on Basilio Colalba, marquis of Ancona, who also entered into Sigismund's Society of the Dragon. In 1415, Ferdinand conferred membership on Sigismund himself during the latter's visit to Perpignan. He also conferred membership on the ambassadors of King Ladislaus of Naples and on Godofredo, illegitimate son of King Charles III of Navarre.

Ferdinand's son, Alfonso V of Aragon, introduced the order to the Kingdom of Naples after he conquered it in 1443. There it replaced the defunct Order of the Knot and Order of the Ship, but Alfonso's successor in Naples, Ferdinand I, founded his own order after 1458. Alfonso V conferred the order on Duke Philip the Good of Burgundy after the latter arranged for his election to the Order of the Golden Fleece. The order was introduced to Navarre by Alfonso's son John II after 1458.
