= Maria of Aragon =

Maria of Aragon may refer to:

- Marie of Montpellier (1182–1213), wife of Peter II of Aragon
- Maria of Aragon (1248–1267), daughter of James I of Aragon and Violant of Hungary, became a nun
- Marie of Lusignan, Queen of Aragon (1273–1319), wife of James II of Aragon
- Maria of Aragon, Lady of Cameros (1299–1347), daughter of James II of Aragon, wife of Infante Peter of Castile, Lord of Cameros
- Maria of Navarre (1329–1347), wife of Peter IV of Aragon
- Maria de Luna (1358–1406), wife of Martin I of Aragon
- Maria of Aragon, Queen of Castile (1396–1445), daughter of Ferdinand I of Aragon, wife of John II of Castile
- Maria of Castile (1401–1458), wife of Alfonso V of Aragon
- Maria of Aragon, Queen of Portugal (1482–1517), daughter of Isabella I of Castile and Ferdinand II of Aragon, and second wife of Manuel I of Portugal
- Maria d'Aragona (1503–1568), Marchese of Vasto, daughter of Fernando de Aragón, 1st Duke of Montalto
- Maria of Aragon (1505–1558), daughter of Joanna of Castile and Philip the Handsome, and wife of Louis II of Hungary

== See also ==
- Maria of Castile (disambiguation)
- Maria Aragon (born 2000), Canadian singer
