= Maria of Castile (disambiguation) =

Maria of Castile may refer to:

- Infanta Maria of Castile (1235–1235), daughter of Ferdinand III of Castile, died young
- Queen María de Molina (1265–1321), wife of Sancho IV of Castile
- Maria de Castilla y Ayala (d. 1424), illegitimate daughter of Peter of Castile and Teresa de Ayala, became a nun and prioress of the Monasterio de Santo Domingo el Real de Toledo, where her mother also professed and was prioress.
- Maria de Castilla y Salazar (?–?), Lady of Mandayona y de Miedes, daughter of Diego de Castilla y Sandoval, illegitimate son of Peter of Castile, wife of Gomez Carrillo de Acuña, Lord of Jadraque.
- Queen Maria of Portugal (1313–1357), wife of Alfonso XI of Castile
- Doña Maria Téllez de Castilla (d. aft. 1389), Lady of Olmeda de la Cuesta, illegitimate daughter of Tello Alfonso, Lord of Aguilar de Campoo, wife of Álvar García de Albórnoz, Lord of Utiel, and later Juan Hurtado de Mendoza, 2nd Lord of Almazán.
- Doña Maria Enriquez de Castilla (d. bef. 1389), Lady of Villafranca, illegitimate daughter Henry II of Castile, wife of Diego Hurtado de Mendoza, 2nd Lord of Hita and Buitrago.
- Infanta Maria of Castile (1401–1458), daughter of Henry III of Castile, wife of Alfonso V of Aragon
- Queen Maria of Aragon (1313–1357), wife of John II of Castile
- Infanta Maria of Castile (1428–1429), daughter of John II of Castile, died young
- Infanta Maria of Castile (1482–1517), daughter of Isabella of Castile and Ferdinand II of Aragon, and second wife of Manuel I of Portugal
- Infanta Maria of Castile (1505–1558), daughter of Joanna of Castile and Philip I of Castile, and wife of Louis II of Hungary
- Doña Maria de Castilla y Cárdenas (d. bef. 1551), illegitimate descendant of Peter of Castile, wife of Diego de la Cueva, and mother of Beltrán de la Cueva, 6th Duke of Alburquerque

== See also ==
- Maria of Aragon (disambiguation)
