= Catherine of Castile =

Catherine of Castile may refer to:

- Catherine of Lancaster, Queen consort of Castile
- Catherine of Castile, Infanta of Castile and Aragon, Duchess of Villena
- Catherine, Princess of Asturias
- Catherine of Aragon, Infanta of Castile and Aragon, Queen consort of England
- Catherine of Austria, Infanta of Castile and Aragon, Queen consort of Portugal
