= Eleanor of Castile (disambiguation) =

Eleanor of Castile (1241–1290) was Queen of England as the wife of King Edward I, and the daughter of Ferdinand III of Castile and Joan, Countess of Ponthieu.

Eleanor of Castile or Leonora of Castile may also refer to:

- Eleanor of England, Queen of Castile (1162–1214), wife of Alfonso VIII, who brought the name into the Castilian Royal Dynasty
- Eleanor of Castile (died 1244), queen consort of Aragon, wife of James I of Aragon
- Eleanor of Castile (1307–1359), queen consort of Aragon, wife of Alfonso IV of Aragon, daughter of Ferdinand IV of Castile
- Eleanor of Aragon, Queen of Castile (1358–1382), wife of John I of Castile, daughter of Peter IV of Aragon and Eleanor of Sicily
- Eleanor of Castile, Queen of Navarre (fl. 1363–1416), queen consort of Navarre, wife of Charles III, daughter of Henry II of Castile, mother of Blanche of Navarre
- Eleanor, Princess of Asturias (1423–1425), daughter and heir presumptive of John II of Castile
- Eleanor of Austria (1498–1558), wife of Manuel I of Portugal and Francis I of France, daughter of Joanna of Castile and Philip the Handsome of Austria-Burgundy
