= Eleanor of Alburquerque =

Queen of Aragon from 1412 to 1416

Eleanor
- Countess of Alburquerque
- Eleanor's tomb effigy at Poblet Monastery

Queen consort of Aragon
- Tenure: 3 September 1412 – 2 April 1416
- Born: 1374; Aldeadávila de la Ribera, Crown of Castile
- Died: 16 December 1435 (aged 61); Medina del Campo, Crown of Castile
- Burial: Poblet Monastery
- Spouse: Ferdinand I of Aragon
- Issue: Alfonso V, King of Aragon; Maria, Queen of Castile; John II, King of Aragon; Henry, Duke of Villena; Eleanor, Queen of Portugal; Pedro, Count of Alburquerque; Sancho, Grand Master of Alcántara
- House: Trastámara
- Father: Sancho, Count of Alburquerque
- Mother: Beatrice of Portugal

Coat of arms of Eleanor of Alburquerque as queen consort.

Eleanor of Alburquerque (1374 – 16 December 1435) was a Castilian noblewoman, Countess of Alburquerque, who became Queen of Aragon by her marriage to Ferdinand I of Aragon. She was the regent of Aragon during the absence of her son the king in 1420.

== Family ==
Eleanor was born in Aldeadávila de la Ribera, province of Salamanca. Her father was Sancho Alfonso, 1st Count of Alburquerque, who was an illegitimate son of King Alfonso XI of Castile and his mistress Eleanor of Guzman, and a brother of King Henry II of Castile. Her mother was Infanta Beatrice, Countess of Alburquerque, who was daughter of Peter I of Portugal and Ines de Castro.

== Marriage and queenship ==
Eleanor was originally betrothed to Frederick, illegitimate son of Henry II of Castile, however this engagement was broken off.

Upon the death of John I of Castile on 9 October 1390, the Regency Council addressed the issue of the heir presumptive, Infante Henry, at the time eleven years of age and his brother, Infante Ferdinand, who was then ten years old. It was agreed that Ferdinand could not marry before his brother Henry reached the age of fourteen. Then he would be granted the political and social privileges of majority.

Peter I of Castile was murdered in March 1369 by his bastard brother Henry. The representatives of the clergy, the nobility, the state of the gentry and merchants, as well as the authorized legal representatives of some Castilian cities agreed that Henry's grandson Infante Henry should marry the granddaughter of the murdered Peter, the English princess Catherine of Lancaster, daughter of John of Gaunt. And as soon as the eldest brother, Henry III, met these requirements, his younger brother, Prince Ferdinand, would marry a good, honorable and rich wife.

Eleanor of Alburquerque was the chosen one, as she was sixteen and old enough to marry. She expressed her agreement to the marriage, although it could not take place immediately as Ferdinand was still ten years old. She owned the towns of Haro, Briones, Vilforado, Ledesma with the five towns, Albuquerque, the Codesera, Azagala, Alconchel, Medellin, Alconétar and Villalon, a gift from her cousin John I of Castile. This made Eleanor a very attractive offer to Ferdinand.

In 1394, Eleanor and Ferdinand were married. The marriage is described as a happy one. In 1412, Ferdinand and Eleanor became King and Queen of Aragon after the Compromise of Caspe. Eleanor was crowned in 1414.

== Later life ==
Ferdinand died in 1416, aged 35 years. Eleanor, who was then 42 years old, retired to Medina del Campo. When her son the king left for Italy in 1420, he appointed her to act as his regent during his absence.

The Royal Palace of Medina del Campo, birthplace of her husband and her children, was transformed into the Convent of Santa María la Real. There, Eleanor witnessed her children fighting against the royalist party led by Álvaro de Luna. Eleanor lost some of her possessions as a benefit for the latter.

In 1435 her sons, the princes of Aragon were taken prisoners by the Genoese after the naval battle of Ponza.

Eleanor died in Medina del Campo, province of Valladolid, in 1435. She is buried in the Convent of Santa María la Real, in a simple grave on the floor. It has a tombstone made from a dark stone from Toledo, with the royal coat of arms carved into it.

== Issue ==
She had seven children:

- Alfonso V of Aragon (1396–1458), also king of Sicily and Naples
- John II of Aragon (1398–1479)
- Henry of Aragon, Duke of Villena, Count of Alburquerque, Count of Empuries and Grand Master of the Order of Santiago (1400–1445)
- Sancho of Aragon (c.1400–March 1416). Created Grand Master of the Orders of Calatrava and Alcántara after 1412.
- Eleanor of Aragon, who married Edward I of Portugal, (1402–1445)
- Maria of Aragon, first wife of John II of Castile, (1403–1445)
- Pedro of Aragon, Count of Alburquerque and Duke of Noto (1406–1438)

== Ancestors ==
Ancestors of Eleanor of Alburquerque

8. Ferdinand IV of Castile
4. Alfonso XI of Castile
9. Constance of Portugal
2. Sancho Alfonso
10. Pedro Núñez de Guzmán
5. Leonor de Guzmán
11. Juana Ponce de León
1. Eleanor of Alburquerque
12. Afonso IV of Portugal
6. Peter I of Portugal
13. Beatrice of Castile
3. Beatrice of Portugal
14. Pedro Fernández de Castro
7. Inês de Castro
15. Aldonça Lourenço de Valadares

== Sources ==
- Real Academia de la Historia
- Earenfight, Theresa (2015). "Trastamara Kings, Queens, and the Gender Dynamics of Monarchy". In Todesca, James (ed.). The Emergence of León-Castile c.1065-1500: Essays Presented to J.F. O'Callaghan. Ashgate. p. 141-160.
- https://web.archive.org/web/20110707104223/http://www.aldeadavila.com/historia/la-historia-de-leonor-de-alburquerque-y-ledesma/

Eleanor of Alburquerque House of Trastámara Born: circa 1374 Died: 16 December 1435
Royal titles
| Vacant Title last held by Margaret of Prades | Queen consort of Aragon, Majorca, Valencia and Sicily; 1412–1416 | Succeeded by Maria of Castile |
Spanish nobility
| Preceded by Sancho | Countess of Alburquerque; 1374–1435 | Succeeded by Henry |
