= Queen Eleanor of Portugal =

Queen Eleanor of Portugal may refer to:

- Eleanor of Aragon, Queen of Portugal
- Eleanor of Viseu

== See also ==
- Eleanor of Portugal (disambiguation)
