= Sancho of Aragon (died 1416) =

Sancho of Aragon (c. 1400 – March 1416) was an Aragonese infante (royal prince) and the grand master of the Order of Alcántara from 1409.

Sancho was born around 1399/1400 or 1401. He was the fourth son of Ferdinand of Trastámara, the future king of Aragon, and Eleanor of Alburquerque. Ferdinand envisaged his children as a powerful bloc of supporters and future co-rulers and made sure they received an education commensurate with their foreseen role.

Ferdinand at first intended to have Sancho appointed archbishop of Toledo, following the death of Pedro Tenorio in 1399. This was strongly opposed by Pope Benedict XIII and Henry III of Castile. Ferdinand acquiesced in the appointment of Benedict's nephew, Pedro de Luna, as archbishop in 1407 and in return Benedict granted a dispensation allowing the child Sancho to be elected to succeed Fernando Rodríguez de Villalobos as master of Alcántara in 1408. As part of the agreement, the income of Sancho's office would go towards Ferdinand's Reconquista until the child came of age.

Sancho was formally received as grand master in the convent of San Pable de Valladolid on 23 January 1409. Owing to his young age, he did not run the order himself. His tenure is associated with major changes to its constitution, particularly the Definiciones, published at Ayllón in 1411.

When his father became king of Aragon through the Compromise of Caspe of 1412, Sancho moved with the new royal court to Aragon. His presence can be traced at his father's coronation in Zaragoza (11 February 1414); at the send-off of his brother John in Jávea (March 1415); and at the wedding of his brother, the future Alfonso V, to Maria of Castile in Valencia (12 June 1415). He then left the court to return to Castile and take up his role as master of Alcántara, but he died en route at Medina del Campo. His mother, who was with him, informed his father in a letter. Alfonso received the news and kept it from Ferdinand, who was very ill. Alfonso held a funeral service for Sancho at Girona on 14 March 1416.
