= Caterina d'Olzinelles =

15th-century woman accused of adultery

Caterina d’Olzinelles (fl. 1448) was a Catalan woman, subject of a cause célèbre in Barcelona, Catalonia, in 1448.

She was the widow of a burgher, with an adult son. As a widow, she had the right by law to live independently. In 1448, she was reported by her son to the authorities, who demanded that she be incarcerated in the La casa de les Repenedides, an asylum for promiscuous women. The case was a complicated one, and handled by the crown as well as the city government in three different trials before it was finally concluded. As a widow, she had the legal right to do as she pleased and protested her confinement, but her example of "vile and disgusting decadence" (which is not described more closely) was considered such a bad example for society that she was eventually placed by royal order of Queen Maria in the house of correction for adultery.
