= Catherine, Princess of Asturias =

Catherine
- Princess of Asturias
- Born: 5 October 1422; Illescas, Toledo
- Died: 10 September 1424 (age 1 year, 341 days); Madrigal de las Altas Torres
- Burial: Miraflores Monastery, Burgos
- House: Trastámara
- Father: John II of Castile
- Mother: Maria of Aragon
- Religion: Roman Catholicism

Catherine of Castile (Castilian: Catalina de Castilla; 5 October 1422 – 10 September 1424) was suo jure Princess of Asturias and heiress presumptive to the Castilian throne all her life.

Catherine was born on 5 October 1422 in Illescas, Toledo. She was the first child of King John II of Castile and his first wife, Maria of Aragon. Named after her grandmother, Catherine of Lancaster, she immediately became heiress presumptive to the throne of Castile upon her birth. The Infanta was formally recognized as successor to the throne of the kingdom and sworn in as Princess of Asturias in early 1423 by the Cortes in Toledo.

Not much is known about Catherine's life. She died of an unknown illness in Madrigal de las Altas Torres on 10 September 1424. Her younger sister, Infanta Eleanor, replaced her as heiress and Princess of Asturias. Infanta Catherine is buried in Miraflores Charterhouse, along with her father and stepmother, Isabella of Portugal.

Catherine of Castile House of Trastámara Born: 5 October 1422 Died: 17 September 1424
Spanish royalty
Preceded by Prince John	Princess of Asturias; 1423–1424	Succeeded by Infanta Eleanor
