= Eleanor of Aragon =

Eleanor or Leanor of Aragon may refer to:

- Infantas of Aragon:
  - Eleanor of Aragon, Countess of Toulouse (1182–1226), daughter of Alfonso II of Aragon
  - Eleanor of Aragon (b. 1251), daughter of James I of Aragon
  - Eleanor of Aragon, Queen of Cyprus (1333–1416), daughter of Infante Pedro, Count of Ribagorza, Ampurias and Prades
  - Eleanor of Aragon (1346–1405), daughter of John, Duke of Randazzo
  - Eleanor of Aragon, Queen of Castile (1358–1382), daughter of Peter IV of Aragon
  - Eleanor of Aragon (1393–1393), daughter of John I of Aragon
  - Eleanor of Aragon, Queen of Portugal (1402–1445), daughter of Ferdinand I of Aragon
  - Leonora d'Aragona, daughter of Alfonso V of Aragon, married in 1444 Marino Marziano, Prince of Rossano
- Infantas of Aragon known by other regions:
  - Eleanor of Provence (1223–1291), daughter of Ramon Berenguer IV, Count of Provence
  - Eleanor of Naples (1450–1493), daughter of Ferdinand I of Naples
  - Eleanor of Navarre (1426–1479), daughter of John II of Aragon
  - Eleanor of Austria (1498–1558), daughter of Joanna I of Aragon
- Four queen consorts of Aragon:
  - Eleanor of Castile (died 1244), wife of James I of Aragon
  - Eleanor of Castile (1307–1359), wife of Alfonso IV of Aragon
  - Eleanor of Sicily, wife of Peter IV of Aragon
  - Eleanor of Alburquerque, wife of Ferdinand I of Aragon
