= Enrique de Aragón y Pimentel =

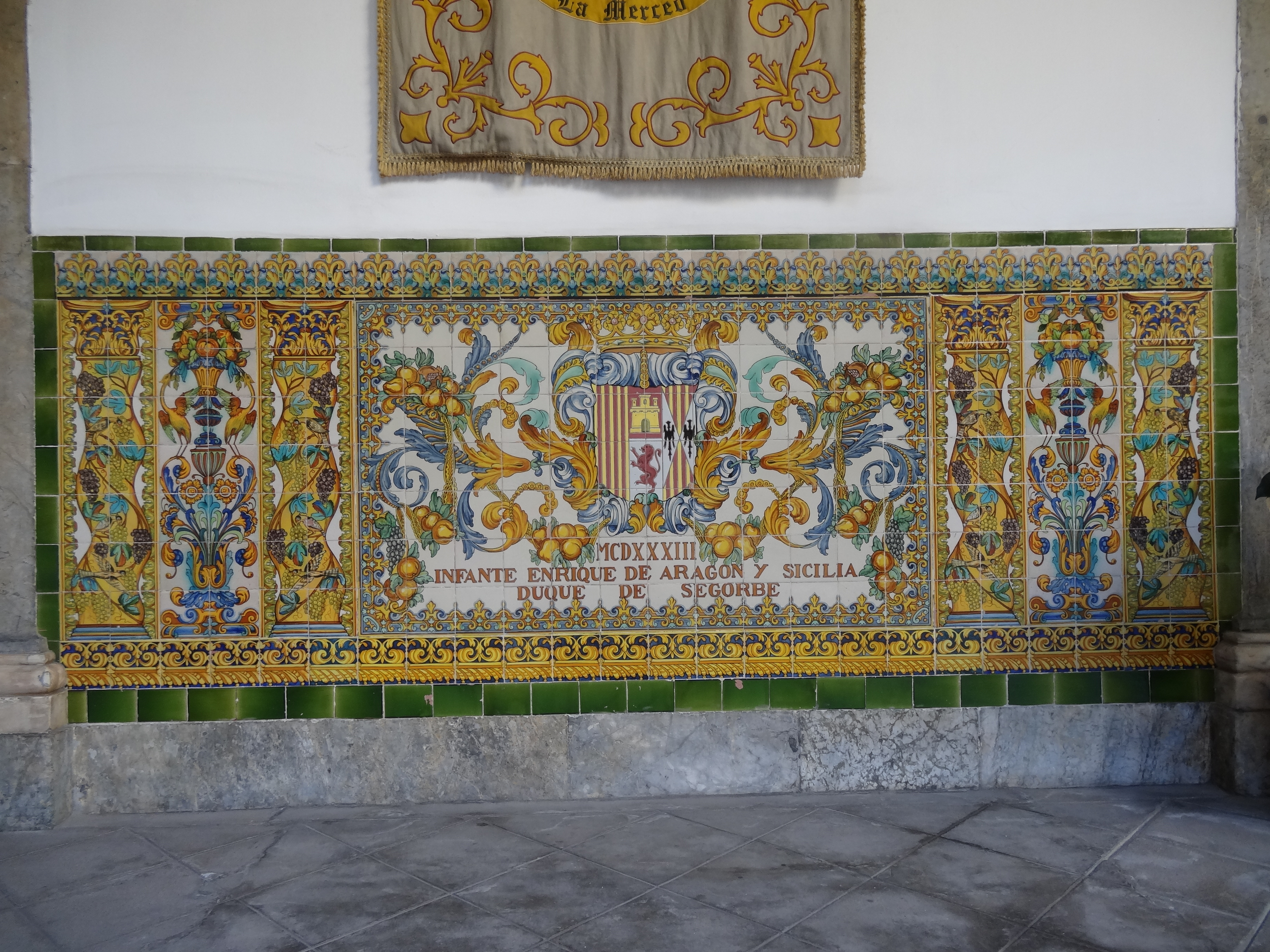
- Born: 25 July 1445; Calatayud
- Died: 2 July 1522 (aged 76); Castelló d'Empúries
- Spouse: Guiomar de Portugal

Duke of Segorbe arms

Enrique de Aragón y Pimentel, known as el Infante Fortuna (Calatayud, 25 July 1445 – Castelló d'Empúries, 2 July 1522), was Count of Empúries becoming Count later 1st Duke of Segorbe.

He served as Viceroy of Catalonia between 1479 and 1493.

== Life ==
The only and posthumous son of Henry, Duke of Villena and his second wife Beatriz de Pimentel, he succeeded his father as Count of Empúries and Count of Segorbe, when his uncle Alfonso V of Aragon, who had served as Regent, died in 1458. In 1469 his countship of Segorbe was elevated to a dukedom.

Known as Infante Fortuna due to the vicissitudes he experienced in his life, his tutor was his uncle, John II, King of Navarre. He was educated in Barcelona until the age of fourteen, "not without some discomfort and hardship" due to the neglect of his uncles, the aforementioned John II and King Alfonso V of Aragon.

During the Catalan Civil War, he was imprisoned in Barcelona but escaped and participated in the Battle of Calaf, commanding the royal cavalry (1465). In this battle, the Constable of Portugal, who had been elected king by the Catalans, was captured. In 1467, during the siege of Roses, which belonged to the Infante as part of the County of Ampurias, he was wounded by a lance.

In 1436, Alfonso V of Aragon granted his brother Enrique the lordship of Segorbe, which included Vall d’Uixó and the Sierra de Eslida, Benaguasil, Paterna, and La Pobla de Vallbona, in the Kingdom of Valencia.

John II of Aragon confirmed the rights to this lordship for Infante Fortuna, which was elevated to a duchy in 1469. In 1474, driven by ambition, Enrique sided with Joanna la Beltraneja in her conflict with the future Isabella I, wife of Prince Ferdinand, heir to the Aragonese crown. The goal of the noble league was to divide the forces of Aragon. As a result, John II—unable to stop Enrique from abandoning his cause in 1473—deprived him of his estates. The Infante took refuge with his cousin, the Count of Benavente, his only serious supporter. On January 11, 1474, the count even demanded that Enrique Fortuna marry Joanna, though this effort was unsuccessful.

However, in 1475, Prince Ferdinand confirmed the privileges granted by Alfonso V and his father, John II. Enrique Fortuna rejoined the side of Isabella and Ferdinand. He participated in the Battle of Toro against the Portuguese and in the siege of Uclés, after which he returned to the Kingdom of Valencia, where his lordship matters required his attention. Indeed, throughout this time, Infante Enrique never physically took possession of the implicated lordships, and the vassals of Segorbe had not sworn allegiance to him. The resistance to abandoning their royal status led to strong unrest in Segorbe. Prince Ferdinand attempted to quell this resistance by economically blockading the Segorbe population, but the Valencian towns did not follow suit. Finally, a siege of Segorbe was ordered, carried out by the lieutenant governor from June 25 to September 3, 1478. After the surrender, there was a general pardon, although it was humiliating for the people of Segorbe.

The possession of Segorbe was primarily an ideological investment rather than an economic one, as the duke’s income mainly came from other sources linked to political control of the state apparatus. These included the 30,370 sueldos annually allocated by the newly crowned King Ferdinand II following his marriage, drawn from royal rents and rights in the Kingdom of Sicily. This pension was confirmed by Charles I in 1516. Other income included 43,000 sueldos granted by John II and confirmed by Ferdinand II, 10,000 from the General Bailiwick of the Kingdom of Aragon, and 30,000 from the General Bailiwick of Valencia. He owned various urban properties in the city of Valencia, acquired in 1501.

These were his main incomes, as those from the former estate of María de Luna—later the Duchy of Segorbe—were mortgaged.

Infante Fortuna, first Duke of Segorbe, held important political positions in the governance of the kingdom (1475) and military posts. He was Viceroy of Valencia in 1478 until November 16, 1479, when he became Viceroy of Catalonia, a position he held from 1479 until 1494, and again in 1497. He supported the war effort in Granada and kept the French at bay in Roussillon.

In 1491, he subdued Count Hugo Roger of Pallars, a rebel to the Crown, whose county was confiscated on December 12, 1491. In 1496, he was again Viceroy of Valencia. He participated in suppressing the Germanías and minor Mudéjar revolts in the Kingdom of Valencia—this time against his own vassals.

The Duke of Segorbe presided over the Military Arm in the Cortes of Valencia. He married the Portuguese noblewoman Guiomar de Castro—daughter of Alfonso, first Count and Lord of Faro and Aveiro, and his wife, María de Noronha.

They were the parents of Juan de Aragón and Sicily, who died as a child on September 1, 1490; Alfonso de Aragón, the second Duke of Segorbe, Count of Ampurias, and Viceroy of Valencia; and Isabel de Aragón and Sicily, who married Íñigo López de Mendoza de la Vega y Lerma, Count of Saldaña, fourth Duke of the Infantado, and fifth Marquess of Santillana, in 1513.

The Duke of Segorbe died on 2 July 1522 at Castelló d'Empúries and is buried in the Poblet Monastery.

== Marriage and Children ==
In 1488, Enrique de Aragón married Guiomar de Portugal (died 1516), sister of Fadrique de Portugal, Privy Counsellor to Ferdinand II of Aragon.
They had 3 children :

- Juan de Aragón (1488–1490).
- Alfonso de Aragón y Portugal (1489–1562), Viceroy of Valencia.
- Isabel de Aragón (1491–1530), married in 1513 Íñigo López de Mendoza, 4th Duke of the Infantado.

== See also ==
- House of Trastámara

== Sources ==
- Gran enciclopèdia catalana
- www.censoarchivos.mcu.es
