= Infanta Catherine, Duchess of Villena =

Infanta Catherine
- Duchess of Villena
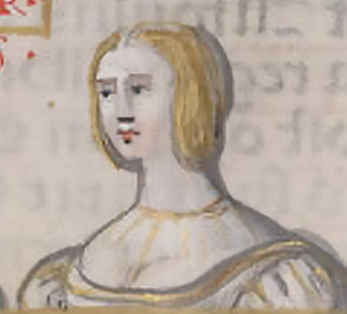
- Born: 1403
- Died: 1439 (aged 35–36)
- Spouse: Infante Henry of Aragon
- House: Trastámara
- Father: Henry III of Castile
- Mother: Catherine of Lancaster

Infanta Catherine of Castile (1403–1439) was suo jure Duchess of Villena and, by marriage, Infanta of Aragon, Countess of Alburquerque and Countess of Ampurias.

Catherine was the second child born to King Henry III of Castile and Catherine of Lancaster. In 1418, she was married off to her first cousin and brother-in-law, Infante Henry of Aragon. The marriage was a part of an agreement by which Henry's older brother Alfonso married Catherine's older sister Maria and by which Henry's sister Maria married Catherine's brother, King John II of Castile.

The Infanta was forced to follow her husband into exile after he failed to take the power away from her brother's favourite, Álvaro de Luna, in 1420. They did not receive all of her dowry until 1427. Her dowry included the Dukedom of Villena. Their marriage was childless. The Duchess of Villena died following a miscarriage in 1439. After her death, her brother confiscated the dukedom.
