= Sancho of Aragon (disambiguation) =

Sancho of Aragon may refer to:

- Sancho Ramírez (d. 1094), king of Aragon from 1063 and king of Pamplona from 1076
- Sancho, Count of Provence (d. 1223), regent of Aragon from 1214 to 1218
- Sancho of Aragon (archbishop of Toledo) (d. 1275), archbishop from 1266
- Sancho of Aragon (died 1416), master of the Order of Alcántara from 1409
