= Maria of Castile =

Queen of Aragon from 1416 to 1458

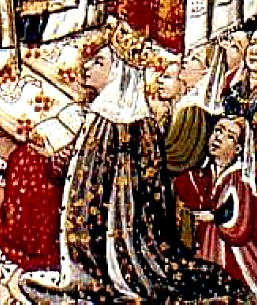

Queen consort of Aragon
- Tenure: 2 April 1416 – 27 June 1458

Queen consort of Naples
- Tenure: 2 June 1442 – 27 June 1458
- Born: 14 September 1401; Segovia, Crown of Castile
- Died: 4 September 1458 (aged 56); Valencia, Kingdom of Valencia
- Burial: Royal Monastery of the Trinity, Valencia, later Piccolomini Chapel, Sant'Anna dei Lombardi, Naples
- Spouse: Alfonso V of Aragon (m. 1415; died 1458)
- House: Trastámara
- Father: Henry III of Castile
- Mother: Catherine of Lancaster

Maria of Castile (14 September 1401 – 4 September 1458) was Queen of Aragon and Naples as the spouse of Alfonso V of Aragon. Maria acted twice as the regent of Aragon during the reign of her spouse, as he was absent during most of his reign; those regencies lasted between 1420 and 1423 and between 1432 and 1458. She was also briefly Princess of Asturias in her own right as the heiress presumptive to the throne of Castile. She succeeded her father, Henry III of Castile, as Princess of Asturias in 1402.

== Childhood ==
Maria was the eldest child of King Henry III of Castile and Catherine of Lancaster. Her godmother was her mother's aunt, María de Ayala, a nun and illegitimate daughter of King Peter of Castile. She grew up in an entirely Castilian household in which she lived until her marriage, which was unusual for a royal daughter destined to marry a foreign prince. Her education was supervised by the great steward, Pedro González de Mendoza, while her governess was Inés de Ayala y Toledo, 3rd Lady de Casarrubios del Monte. As the king's eldest child, Maria was granted the title of Princess of Asturias, the title reserved for the first-in-line to the throne. Her father had her formally recognised as heiress presumptive at the Cortes of Toledo on 6 January 1402. At the same time, she was betrothed to her first cousin, Alfonso, the son of her paternal uncle Ferdinand, as a way to strengthen her status. However, the birth of her brother John (the future king) displaced the Princess in the line of succession; from that moment on, she was merely an infanta.

Her childhood was quite happy by all accounts; the frailty of her health was not evident until she was a married adolescent. Her father died when she was four, leaving the crown to her only brother, John II, and making her heiress presumptive again. Her mother, Queen Catherine, governed the Crown of Castile as regent during King John II's minority and the Infanta was able to observe her mother's statesmanship. The queen mother's political actions would later make Maria aware of her own responsibilities and prerogatives as a queen and as a regent. Mother and daughter were very close and remained in frequent correspondence even after the latter's marriage.

== Marriage ==
The engagement of Maria and Alfonso was not formalised until she was seven, but it had been reconfirmed by King Henry III's last will and testament. By the same arrangement, Maria's brother John was to marry Alfonso's sister Maria and Maria's sister Catherine was to marry Alfonso's brother Henry. The marriage of Maria and Alfonso was celebrated in the Cathedral of Valencia on 12 June 1415. The couple was wedded by Antipope Benedict XIII who had also provided a dispensation for their marriage. Maria was given a splendid dowry in form of land and revenues, while Alfonso was raised to the rank of infante of Castile. Her brother would later complain that the dowry was too large and that it was, in fact, the largest dowry ever given to an infanta of Castile.

Family squabbles were frequent due to the politics of her father-in-law and mother-in-law, Eleanor of Alburquerque. The infantes of Aragon, her brothers-in-law, Henry, Peter and especially the meddlesome John would prove problematic and pertinent to Maria's regency.

Maria had a delicate health; it is possible that she had epilepsy. A bout of smallpox left her permanently scarred and unattractive. She did not have her first menstrual period until she was sixteen and the consummation of the marriage had to be delayed; the couple would have no children. Her marriage was simply a political alliance. The few moments of marital happiness occurred during the early years of the marriage. The lack of children deeply affected their marriage and Alfonso's reign. Their relationship began visibly deteriorating in 1423, after Alfonso's return from Naples and upon learning that her husband's Italian lover, Giraldona Carlino, had given him a son, Ferdinand. Deeply hurt by his infidelity, she falsely informed him that his mother had died in order to inflict pain on him. Divorce was not an option and the couple remained together out of convenience.

== Queen regent ==
Maria's coat of arms as queen

Less than one year later, on 1 April 1416, King Ferdinand I died, leaving the crown to Maria's husband and making her Queen of Aragon. Illness prevented her from attending both her father-in-law's and her mother's funeral. Like all queens of Aragon except for only five (her mother-in-law included), Maria was never crowned queen. There is no evidence that the politically active Queen Eleanor ever prepared her daughter-in-law for her role, as would have been customary. She was overshadowed by her formidable mother-in-law who continued to exercise strong political influence even after her husband's death. The young Queen appeared in public only when it was necessary and refrained from taking part in politics, instead deferring to Eleanor. Maria moved into the public eye only when the queen mother's health began deteriorating.

In 1420, Alfonso left Aragon to pursue his claim to the throne of Naples. He was unwilling to leave the regency to any of his ambitious and untrustworthy brothers who almost caused war between Castile and Aragon on several occasions. Instead, he declared Maria his regent. Before departing, he issued a document granting her authority second only to his own and the right to govern as if she were him.

As the King was absent from Aragon almost his entire reign, the Queen was the de facto ruler of the kingdom, holding the formal title of lieutenant-general. While her personal retinue included many Castilians, Maria strategically appointed only Aragonese to the offices during her regency, which contributed to her popularity and the smooth functioning of her court.

Her first tenure as regent lasted from 1420 until 1423, and her second from 1432 until her husband's death in 1458. As such, she was forced to handle the conflicts with the burghers and the peasants which broke out during her husband's reign. When Alfonso was captured after his defeat at Ponza in Italy in 1435, she organised the funds to pay his release. On one occasion, Queen Maria of Aragon and Queen Maria of Castile, the two cousins and sisters-in-law, mediated the peace treaty between Aragon and Castile in Valladolid on behalf of their husbands; it was said that there would have been peace in Spain at that time if the Queen of Castile had as much authority as the Queen of Aragon. In 1454, after her brother's death, the Queen of Aragon travelled to Castile to negotiate with its new king, her nephew, Henry IV. She stayed in Arévalo, Castile, until the year before her death in 1458, 2 months after her husband.

== Bibliography ==
- Earenfight, Theresa (2010). The King's other Body: María of Castile and the Crown of Aragon. University of Pennsylvania Press. ISBN 978-0-8122-4185-3.
- Jansen, Sharon L. (2002). The Monstrous Regiment of Women: Female Rulers in Early Modern Europe. Palgrave Macmillan. ISBN 0-312-21341-7.
- Previte-Orton, C.W. (1912). The Shorter Cambridge Medieval History. Vol. 2. Cambridge at the University Press.

Maria of Castile House of Trastámara Born: 14 September 1401 Died: 4 September 1458
Spanish royalty
Preceded by Eleanor of Alburquerque	Queen consort of Aragon, Majorca, Valencia and Sicily; 1416–1458	Succeeded by Juana Enríquez
Preceded by Isabella of Lorraine	Queen consort of Naples; 1442–1458	Succeeded by Isabella of Clermont
Spanish royalty
Preceded by Henry	Princess of Asturias; 1402–1405	Succeeded by John
