= Peter of Aragon, Count of Alburquerque =

Peter, Infante of Aragon (1406/1411 ? – 1438 besieging Naples, Italy), Viceroy of Sicily (1424–1425) and Duke of Noto, was the sixth child of King Ferdinand I of Aragón and Countess Eleanor of Alburquerque.

== Biography ==
The brothers future king John, Henry and Peter formed an ambitious group of princes, known as the Infantes of Aragon, who aimed to seize power in Castile at the expense of their cousin and brother in law, King Juan II of Castile. They were particularly opposed to Álvaro de Luna, favourite of the king and central figure of the Castilian Kingdom.

He participated in the fights of his brother Infante Enrique, against King John II and Álvaro de Luna, taking an active part in the struggles in the eastern part of Castile between 1426 and 1431. His capture in 1431 led to the pacification of the regions of Salamanca and Extremadura, as he was required to surrender all the fortresses and possessions that his family owned there in order to be released.

In 1434 he moved to the Kingdom of Sicily together with his brother Infante Enrique, to help their older brother Alfonso V of Aragon, King of Aragon, in his aspirations to occupy the throne of the Kingdom of Naples. Thus he participated in the disastrous Battle of Ponza, managing to escape capture by leading two galleys towards Gaeta and managing to seize this city and later also Terracina.

Peter, Duke of Noto, died in battle, aged 27, in Italy, when besieging Naples during the Aragonese conquest of Naples .

=== Contact with Ethiopia ===
Yeshaq I made the earliest known contact from post-Axumite Ethiopia to a European ruler. He sent a letter by two dignitaries to king Alfonso V of Aragon, which reached the king in 1428, proposing an alliance against the Muslims, which would be sealed by a dual marriage, that would require Infante Peter to bring a group of artisans to Ethiopia, where he would marry Yeshaq's daughter. It is not clear how or if Alfonso responded to this letter, although in a letter that reached Yeshaq's successor Zara Yaqob in 1450, Alfonso wrote that he would be happy to send artisans to Ethiopia if their safe arrival could be guaranteed, for on a previous occasion a party of thirteen of his subjects traveling to Ethiopia had all perished.
