= Sack of Tétouan (1399) =

Castilian attack to Tétouan

- Part of Reconquista
Date	1399
Location	Tétouan, Marinid Sultanate
Result	Castilian victory

Belligerents
Crown of Castile	Marinid Sultanate

Commanders and leaders
Hugo de Mendoza	Unknown

Casualties and losses
Low	The entire population of the city massacred or enslaved

The Sack of Tétouan of 1399 was an attack led by Hugo de Mendoza to Tétouan, then controlled by the Marinid Sultanate. The objective of this attack was to put an end to their pirates, who were attacking Castilian ships after the Marinid ruler incited them to do so.

== Background ==
During the late 14th century, Tétouan was known for its pirates which were constantly attacking Castilian ships. Henry III of Castile, tired of them, decided send a fleet commanded by Hugo de Mendoza to attack the city and to put an end to these pirates.

== Sacking ==
In 1399, Hugo de Mendoza landed on the banks of the Martil and marched to Tétouan. Without encountering much resistance, he destroyed their fortifications, their port and then occupied and sacked the city. Half of the population was killed and the other half was enslaved. This attack caused the city to be abandoned for almost a century.

== Bibliography ==
- Stone, Caroline (1985). The Embroideries of North Africa. Longman. ISBN 9780582783713.
- Rézette, Robert (1976). Les enclaves espagnoles au Maroc (in French). Nouvelles Editions Latines.
- Guide Vert Maroc epub (in French). Michelin. 2024. ISBN 9782067267664.
- Paez Lopez, Jerónimo (2006). Ibn Khaldoun: la Méditerranée au XIVe siècle (in French). Fundación El legado andalusì. ISBN 9788496395268.
- Ángel Ferreiro, Miguel (2022). La segunda columna: Lo que dejamos en África (in Spanish). ISBN 9788441441989.
- Le Panot, Alain (1990). Le guide du Maroc (in French). FeniXX. ISBN 9782402567428.
- Hirschberg, H. Z. (2024). A History of the Jews in North Africa: Volume 1 From Antiquity to the Sixteenth Century. BRILL. ISBN 9789004671102.
