= Ferdinand I of Aragon =

King of Aragon, Valencia, and Sicily from 1412 to 1416

Ferdinand I
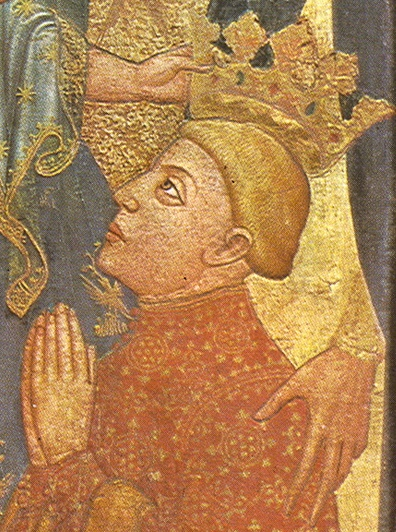
- Ferdinand I being crowned by the infant Jesus in San Benito el Real Valladolid, by Juan Rodríguez de Toledo (c..1410–15)

King of Aragon, Valencia, Majorca, Sicily, Sardinia, and Corsica Count of Barcelona, Roussillon, and Cerdanya Duke of Athens and Neopatria
- Reign: 25 June 1412 – 2 April 1416
- Coronation: 11 February 1414 (Zaragoza)
- Predecessor: Martin
- Successor: Alfonso V
- Born: 27 November 1380; Medina del Campo
- Died: 2 April 1416 (aged 35); Igualada
- Burial: Poblet Monastery
- Consort: Eleanor of Alburquerque (m. 1394)
- Issue among others...: Alfonso V, King of Aragon; Maria, Queen of Castile; John II, King of Aragon; Henry, Duke of Villena; Eleanor, Queen of Portugal; Peter, Count of Alburquerque; Sancho, Grand Master of Alcántara
- House: Trastámara
- Father: John I of Castile
- Mother: Eleanor of Aragon

Ferdinand I (Spanish: Fernando I; 27 November 1380 – 2 April 1416 in Igualada, Òdena) named Ferdinand of Antequera and also the Just (or the Honest) was king of Aragon, Valencia, Majorca, Sardinia and (nominally) Corsica and king of Sicily, duke (nominal) of Athens and Neopatria, and count of Barcelona, Roussillon and Cerdanya (1412–1416). He was also regent of Castile (1406–1416). He was the first Castilian ruler of the Crown of Aragon.

== Biography ==
Ferdinand was born 27 November 1380 in Medina del Campo, the younger son of King John I of Castile and Eleanor of Aragon.

On 15 August 1403 in Medina del Campo, Ferdinand founded a new order of knighthood, the Order of the Jar.

In 1406, upon the death of his elder brother, King Henry III of Castile, Ferdinand declined the Castilian crown and instead, with Henry's widow Catherine of Lancaster, became coregent during the minority of his nephew John II of Castile. In this capacity he distinguished himself by his prudent administration of domestic affairs.

In a war with the Muslim Kingdom of Granada, he conquered the town of Antequera (1410), whence his surname.

After Ferdinand's maternal uncle, King Martin I of Aragon (Martin II of Sicily), died without surviving legitimate issue, Ferdinand was chosen King of Aragon in 1412 to succeed him in the Compromise of Caspe. The other candidate, Count James II of Urgell (see Counts of Urgell), revolted and Ferdinand dissolved the County of Urgell in 1413.

Ferdinand created the title of Prince of Girona for the heir of the Crown of Aragon on 19 February 1416.

The most notable accomplishment of his brief reign was his agreement in 1416 to depose the Antipope Benedict XIII, thereby helping to end the Western Schism, which had divided the Roman Catholic Church for nearly 40 years.

He is buried in the Crown of Aragon's royal pantheon of the monastery of Poblet, in a magnificent tomb ordered by his son Alfonso to Pere Oller in 1417.

The Italian humanist Lorenzo Valla wrote an official biography of Ferdinand, Historiarum Ferdinandi regis Aragonum libri sex.

== Family and children ==
In 1394 Ferdinand married Eleanor of Alburquerque (1374–1435). They had seven children:

- Alfonso V of Aragon (1396–1458), king of Aragon, Sicily and Naples, married Maria of Castile
- John II of Aragon (1398–1479)
- Henry of Aragon (c. 1400-1445), duke of Villena, count of Alburquerque and Empuries, lord of Sogorb, etc. and grand master of the military Order of Santiago, married Catherine of Castile
- Eleanor of Aragon, (1402–1445), queen of Portugal, who married Edward I of Portugal
- Maria of Aragon, (1403–1445), queen of Castile, first wife of John II of Castile
- Peter of Aragon (1406–1438), count of Alburquerque and duke of Noto
- Sancho of Aragon (c.1400–1416), grand master of the Orders of Calatrava and Alcántara

== Appearance and character ==
"He was tall, a little more than average, and thin and ruddy, and his cheeks had a few freckles... very patient to all who wanted to talk to him, even if their speeches were ordinary or not well-reasoned..."

== Genealogy ==
Alfonso IV of Aragon
Peter IV of Aragon	James I of Urgell
Peter II of Urgell
John I of Castile	Eleanor of Aragon	Martin of Aragon	Isabella of Aragon	James II of Urgell
Catherine of Lancaster	Henry III of Castile	Ferdinand I of Aragon
John II of Castile

Ferdinand I of Aragon House of Trastámara Born: 27 November 1380 Died: 2 April 1416
Regnal titles
Preceded by Martin the Humane	King of Aragon, Valencia, Majorca, Sicily, Sardinia and Corsica; Count of Barcelona, Roussillon and Cerdagne; 1412–1416	Succeeded by Alfonso the Magnanimous
