= House of Trastámara =

Royal house of Castilian origin

House of Trastámara Casa de Trastámara
- Parent house: Castilian House of Burgundy (illegitimate)
- Country: Crown of Castile, Crown of Aragon
- Founded: 1366; 660 years ago
- Founder: Henry II of Castile
- Final ruler: Joanna of Castile
- Titles: King of Castile and León; King of Aragon, Valencia, Majorca, Sicily and Naples; Count of Barcelona; Emperor and Autocrat of all Romans (Note: Andreas's genealogical heir(s) would have been his children (if he had any) or his younger brother, Manuel. Upon his death, Andreas however willed the title of 'Emperor of Constantinople' to Ferdinand II of Aragon and Isabella I of Castile. Unlike the French kings, neither monarch, nor any of their descendants, ever used or even acknowledged the title. Since Andreas's death, numerous forgers and imposters have falsely claimed Byzantine descent and titles, though none have been widely recognized.)
- Dissolution: 1555; 471 years ago
- Cadet branches: House of Trastámara – Avis

The House of Trastámara (Spanish: Casa de Trastámara, Catalan: Casal de Trastàmara) was a Spanish dynasty of Castilian origin which ruled in the Crown of Castile from 1369 to 1504, in the Crown of Aragon from 1412 to 1516, in the Kingdom of Navarre from 1425 to 1479 and from 1512 to 1516, and in the Kingdom of Naples from 1458 to 1501 and from 1504 to 1516.

The Trastámaras, an illegitimate cadet line of the ruling House of Burgundy (Castile), take its name from the County of Trastámara (from Trans Tamaris, ‘beyond the River Tambre’), one of the titles held by Henry II of Castile, the founder of the dynasty, before he became king.

They acceded to power in Castile as a result of the victory of Henry of Trastámara over his half-brother Peter I in the 1351–1369 Castilian Civil War, in which the nobility, and, to a lesser extent the clergy, had played a decisive role in favour of the former. The resulting dynastic change saw a radicalization of the anti-Jewish sentiment in Castile in which religious doctrinal anti-Judaism, aristocratic political antisemitism, and folk antisemitism converged, already exacerbated by the ongoing economic and social crisis, which had its climax in the 1391 pogroms.

After the succession crisis in the neighbouring Crown of Aragon, due to the death of Martin of Aragon without a legitimate heir, the 1412 Compromise of Caspe installed a member of the house of Trastámara, Ferdinand of Antequera, as monarch.

After the marriage of the Catholic Monarchs (Isabella of Castilla and Ferdinand of Aragon, both members of the house of Trastámara), Castile and Aragon were ruled under a dynastic union, despite former conflicts, such as the War of the Castilian Succession, waged between Aragon-supported and Portuguese-supported parties over the throne of Castile.

The dynasty was succeeded by the House of Habsburg upon the effective enthronement of Charles V as king of Castile and Aragon in 1516, even though his mother Joanna lived (imprisoned from 1509 and with deteriorating health) until 1555.

== 14th century: toward unification with Aragon ==
=== Peter I and the Rise of Trastámara ===
Upon the death of the Castilian King Alfonso XI in 1350, his eldest son, Peter, took control of the Castilian throne as Peter I of Castile. Peter was born to Alfonso and his wife, Maria of Portugal, but Alfonso lived out a long and public affair with Eleanor of Guzman. Alfonso's illegitimate children by Eleanor, known collectively as the Trastámaras, immediately became rivals of the newly crowned Peter. Because of a personal history, including political murders, his enemies quickly nicknamed him Peter the Cruel. Also increasing the hostilities between Peter and his half brothers was the act of Peter's mother taking the opportunity of his power to have Eleanor of Guzman arrested and executed.

Peter first resisted an attempt at his crown by defeating a coalition led by Henry of Trastámara (for whom Peter's half siblings derived their surname) in 1356. Peter again defeated his rivals at Nájera in 1360 and had his half brothers Juan and Pedro executed. Having been protected by Aragon, Henry was forced to flee to France when the Castilian crown signed a peace treaty with Aragon in 1360.

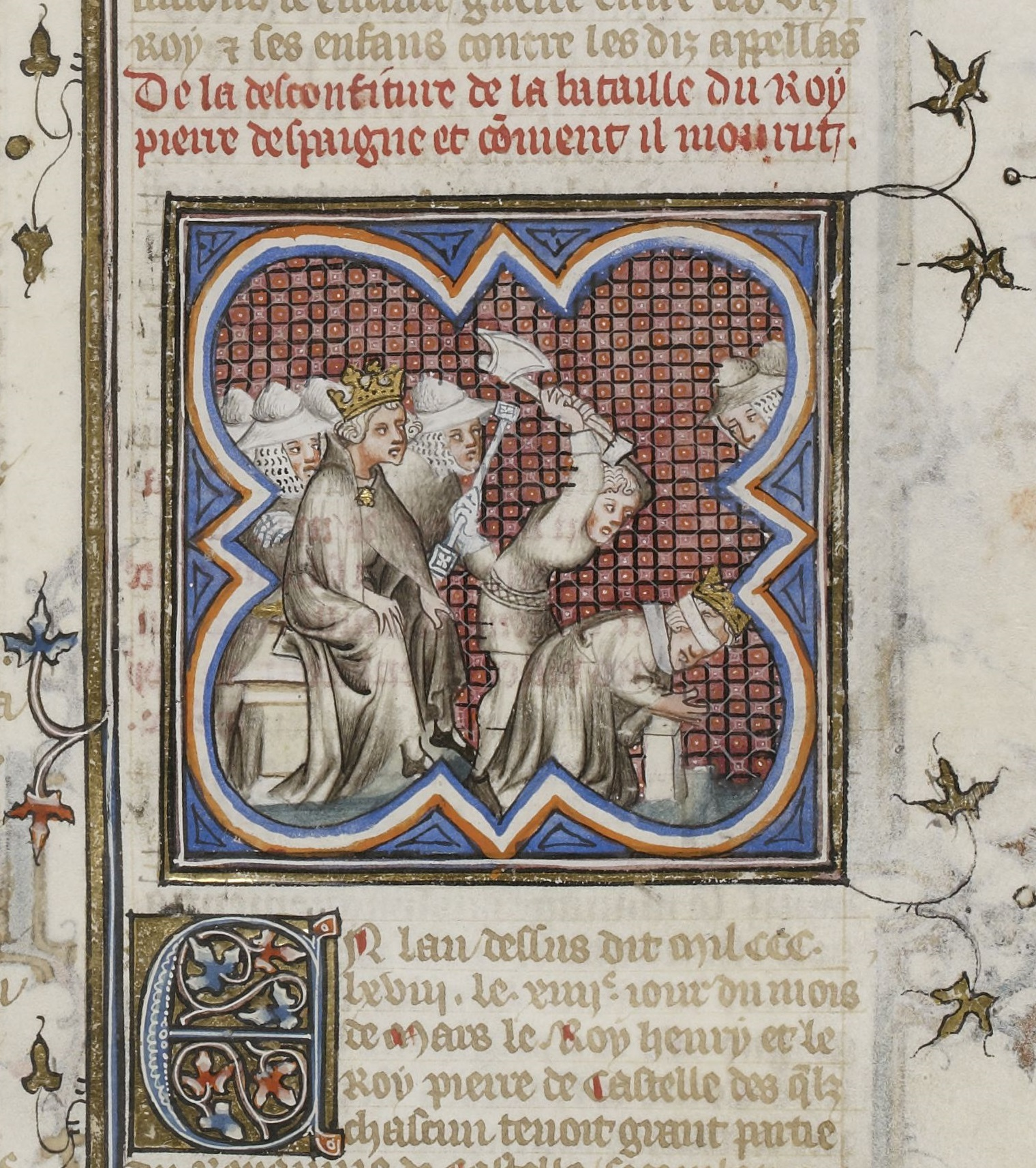
Henry supervising the beheading of his rival Peter, from the Grandes Chroniques de France.

Gaining support throughout Castile because of his relation to Alfonso XI and Peter's continuous military escapades, Henry built an alliance with Aragon and France, including mercenaries led by French constable Bertram Du Guesclin for another attempt at the Castilian crown in 1365. Peter gained the support of Edward the Black Prince, heir to the English throne and son of Edward III of England, to help defend his crown with the promise of territorial gains. On 13 April 1367, Peter and Edward's forces strongly defeated the armies of Francs, Aragonese, and Castilians led by Henry and captured Bertram Du Guesclin. As Edward fell ill, and sick with Peter's attempts to get Edward's prisoners executed, and perhaps with Peter's delay or failure to fulfill his promises of land to England, the Plantagenets withdrew from their direct battlefield support of the Castilian Crown to the new front in Gascony opened to the French. In March 1369, with the continued support of France and Aragon, and growing support in important cities in parts of Castile, Henry's forces again invaded the Castilian Crown's realm and checked Peter's army. Henry of Trastámara himself was responsible for the death of his brother, Peter I of Castile.

=== Reign of Henry II ===
Following his killing of his half brother, Peter I, Henry of Trastámara took control of the crown of Castile as Henry II. Under Henry, a new nobility rose in prominence to gain land grants of large estates and vast royal privileges. The public rise of this new class of nobles caused discontent and instability in Castile. This class of nobility was driven by their desire to reclaim family holdings and was generally compelled to use any means necessary. Despite the instability, Henry's forces were able to withstand Portuguese, Navarrese, and Granadian attempts to invade and take control of Castile.

Henry made an agreement with the ruler of Aragon, Peter IV, to have their children wed. Henry's son, John, was married to Peter IV's daughter, Eleanor, on 18 June 1375. This marriage by Henry's son would eventually put the Trastámaras in control of both Castile and Aragon, comprising a majority of the Iberian Peninsula. After giving birth to three children, Eleanor died in 1382, after only seven years of marriage.

== The Trastámaras' rule in several realms ==
Upon Henry II's death in 1379, his son John came to power as John I of Castile. During his reign, John took Beatrice, daughter of King Ferdinand I of Portugal, as his second wife. On the basis of this marriage, John made an unsuccessful claim to the throne of Portugal upon Ferdinand I's death in 1383, a move that possibly could have led to the unification of all of the Iberian Peninsula. John died very unexpectedly in 1390.

Upon his untimely death, John's eldest son Henry came to the throne as Henry III, at the very young age of twelve. He waited only two years to independently take control of the throne in 1393 at only fourteen, amidst a great deal of violence being carried out against Jews throughout Castile. Among the young king's accomplishments was his taking of control of the Canary Islands, providing Castile with a holding in the Atlantic Ocean. In 1406, amidst an invasion by Granada's forces in Murcia, Henry died while planning a response at the age of 27.

John II, Henry III's son, was left as the only heir upon Henry's death in 1406, but he was only two years old. Henry's brother, Ferdinand, served as regent, along with John's mother, Catherine of Lancaster.

During his time as regent, Ferdinand was chosen as the ruler of Aragon, due to his maternal relation to the Aragonese throne through the Compromise of Caspe in 1412. The Trastámaras now ruled in both the realms of Castile and Aragon.

== 1418–69: Conflict within the House of Trastámara ==
=== John II and Don Álvaro ===
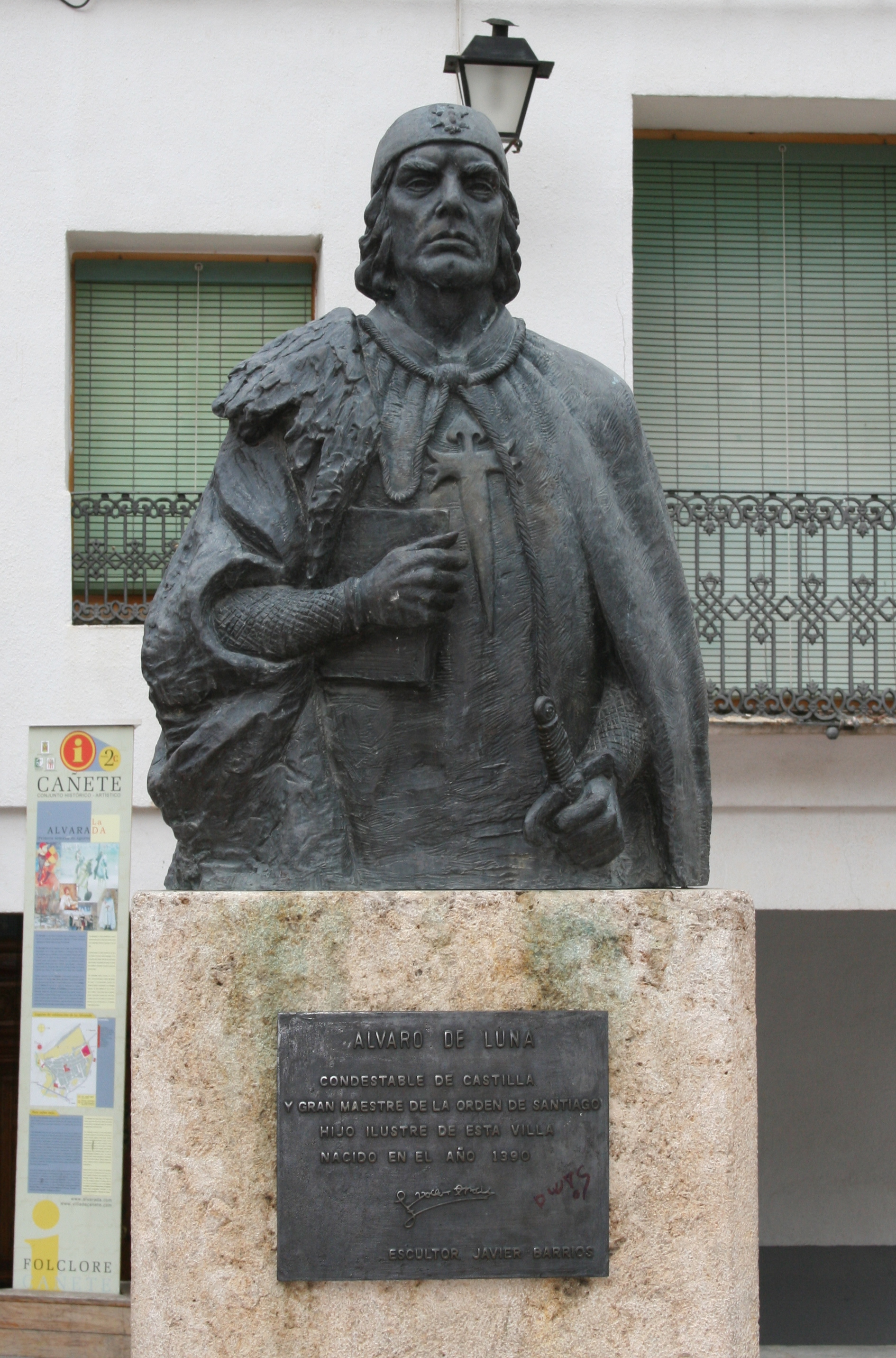
Statue of Álvaro de Luna in Cañete

John II came to power upon his mother's death in 1418. He was now a cousin to the King of Aragon, as Alfonso ascended to the throne upon Ferdinand I's death. John married Maria, the sister of Alfonso V of Aragon. Alfonso himself had already married John's sister, Maria, making the two rulers both cousins and brothers-in-law twice over. John II was now also a cousin and brother-in-law to Alfonso's brothers John and Henry, known collectively as the Infantes of Aragon, who had been given large amounts of land in Castile while their father worked as regent during John II's childhood.

John II lacked widespread authority, and Castile became a battlefield for nobles to gain power and political influence. In 1420, just two years after coming to power, John was kidnapped by his cousin Infante Henry. Henry ruled on John's behalf for much of the year until John was able to escape because of the help of his friend, and eventual royal favorite, Álvaro de Luna, who was known as Don Alvaro.

In 1429, Alfonso V ordered the Infantes to lead a joint attack on Castile. Now John II's constable, Don Alvaro, agreed to a basically victorious truce, as the Aragonese branch of Trastámaras was removed from Castile. John II's authority continued to decline following this military engagement, and he eventually ceded all power to Don Alvaro, who created an oligarchy of nobles. Don Alvaro lost this power in 1439 to a nobility which was allied with Alfonso V, and in 1443, John II was once again captured by Infante John of Aragon, throwing Castile into near anarchy. This confusion was settled in 1445, when a group of nobles favoring the monarchy, led by Don Alvaro, won a battle at Olmedo. Infante Henry was killed as a result of this battle.

In 1453, Don Álvaro was publicly beheaded for charges of tyranny. In July of the following year, John II died, and his son Henry became King Henry IV of Castile.

=== Henry IV and the rise of Isabella I ===
Henry IV of Castile was an unpopular ruler, in part because of his taste for Moorish fashion and his disagreement with military engagement with Granada. He was married at the age of 15 in 1440 to John II of Aragon's daughter, Blanche. John II had succeeded to the throne of Aragon upon the death of his brother Alfonso V of Aragon. This marriage failed, however, as a result of Henry's inability to consummate it. He was remarried in 1455 to Joanna of Portugal. Queen Joanna gave birth to Princess Joanna in 1462, and she was recognized by the Cortes as Henry's legitimate successor. In 1464, charges were raised by powerful noble families that Princess Joan was the daughter of one of Henry's favourites, The 1st Duke of Alburquerque.

These powerful noble families eventually forced Henry IV to hand over power to his brother Alfonso in 1465, but Alfonso suddenly died a month later. Amidst the struggle to settle the ensuing claims to the throne, Henry's wife Joan became pregnant again while being held as a hostage of a noble family. This sign of misbehavior further weakened her daughter Princess Joan's claim to the throne, and paved the way for Henry's half-sister Isabella to take power.

=== Treaty of the Bulls of Guisando and War of Succession ===
The Treaty of the Bulls of Guisando was signed in 1468 and named Isabella heir to Henry's throne, as she and the nobles renewed their allegiance to Henry in return. A quick marriage for Isabella was a condition of the agreement, but Henry objected to her 1469 marriage to Ferdinand, who was the King of Sicily and the heir to the Aragonese throne, as a breach of the pact. He once again named his daughter Joanna as his heir, and a civil war ensued throughout the next decade. Isabella's military factions were eventually victorious with the help of Aragon, which made her queen and united the Crowns of Aragon and Castile.

== Family tree ==
House of Trastámara family tree

Monarchs of Castile: ; monarchs of Aragon: ; monarchs of Navarre: ; monarchs of Castile & Aragon (i.e. Spain): ; monarchs of Naples only: ;
—————— legitimate children
— — — marriage
........................ liaison and illegitimate children

Maria of Portugal; 1313–1357	Alfonso XI; 1311–1350; King of Castile r.1313–1350	Eleanor de Guzmán; 1310–1351
Peter; 1334–1369; King of Castile r.1350–1366; 1367–1369	Henry II; 1334–1379; King of Castile r.1366–1367; 1369–1379	Juana Manuel of Villena; 1339–1381
Constance; Duchess of Lancaster; 1354–1394	John I 1358–1390; King of Castile; 1379–1390	Eleanor of Aragon; 1358–1382	(illeg.) Alfonso Enriquez count of Gijón and Noreña
Catherine of Lancaster; 1373–1418	Henry III; 1379–1406; King of Castile; 1390–1406	Ferdinand I 1380–1416; King of Aragon; 1412–1416	Eleanor; Countess of Alburquerque; 1374–1435	Fernando de Noronha count of Vila Real
John II; 1405–1454; King of Castile; 1406–1454	Maria of Aragon; 1403–1445	Juana; Enríquez de Córdoba; 1425–1468	John II; 1398–1479; King of Aragon; 1458–1479	Blanche I 1387–1441; Queen of Navarre; 1425–1441	Maria of Castile; 1401–1458	Alfonso V 1396–1458; King of Aragon; 1416–1458	Henry duke of Villena	Peter count of Alburquerque
Alfonso prince of Asturias	Henry IV; 1425–1474; King of Castile; 1454–1474	Isabella I 1451–1504; Queen of Castile; 1474–1504	Ferdinand II; 1452–1516; King of Aragon; 1479–1516	Charles IV; 1421–1461 de jure King of Navarre; 1441–1461	Blanche II; 1424–1464 de jure Queen of Navarre; 1461–1464	Eleanor; 1426–1479; Queen of Navarre; 1479	Maximilian I Holy Roman; Emperor; 1459–1519 r.1486–1519	(illeg.) Alfonso duke of Villahermosa	(illeg.) Juan archbishop of Zaragoza	Ferdinand I 1423–1494; King of Naples; 1458–1494; Royal Family of Naples	Enrique count of Empúries, duke of Segorbe
(illeg.) Alfonso archbishop of Zaragoza	Afonso, Crown Prince of Portugal; 1475–1491	Isabella of Aragon; 1470–1498; Queen of Portugal; 1497–1498	Manuel I 1469–1521; King of Portugal; 1495–1521	Maria of Aragon; 1482–1517; Queen of Portugal; 1500–1517	Joanna; 1479–1555; Queen of Castile; 1504–1555; Queen of Aragon; 1516–1555	Philip I 1478–1506; King of Castile; 1506	John; Prince of Asturias; 1478–1497	Margaret of Austria; 1480–1530; Duchess of Savoy	Catherine of Aragon; 1485–1536; Queen of England; 1509–1533	Henry VIII; 1491–1547; King of England r.1509–1547	Alfonso II king of Naples; 1494–1495	Frederick king of Naples; 1496–1501	Giovanni archbishop, cardinal 1456–1481	Ferdinando duke of Montalto bef.1494–1542
Hernando archbishop of Zaragoza	Miguel da Paz; Prince of Portugal and Asturias; 1498–1500	Royal; Family of Portugal	Isabella of Portugal; 1503–1539; Queen and Empress; 1526–1539	Charles; 1500–1558; King of Spain; 1516–1556; Holy Roman; Emperor; 1519–1556	Mary I 1516–1558; Queen of England r.1553–1558	Ferdinand II king of Naples; 1495–1496	(illeg.) Alfonso duke of Bisceglie; 1498–1500	Ferdinand duke of Calabria; 1488–1550
House of Habsburg (casa de Austria)	Rodrigo duke of Bisceglie; 1500–1512

== See also ==
- List of Navarrese monarchs from the House of Trastámara
- Navarre monarchs family tree

== Notes ==
*Royal House* House of Trastámara Cadet branch of the Castilian House of Ivrea
Preceded by Castilian House of Ivrea	Ruling house of the Kingdom of Castile and León; 1369 – 1555	Succeeded by House of Habsburg
Preceded by House of Barcelona	Ruling house of the Aragon, Catalonia, Valencia, Mallorca, Sardinia & Sicily; 1412–1555	Succeeded by House of Habsburg
Preceded by Capetian House of Anjou, House of Valois-Anjou	Ruling house of the Kingdom of Naples; 1442–1555	Succeeded by House of Habsburg
