= Eleanor, Princess of Asturias =

Heir to the Castilian throne (1423–1425)

Eleanor
- Princess of Asturias
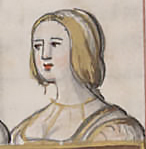
- Born: 10 September 1423; Burgos
- Died: 22 August 1425 (aged 1 year 11 months); La Espina
- Burial: La Espina
- House: Trastámara
- Father: John II of Castile
- Mother: Maria of Aragon

Eleanor of Castile (Castilian: Leonor de Castilla; 10 September 1423 – 22 August 1425) was heir presumptive to the throne of the Crown of Castile and Princess of Asturias from 1424 until a few months before her death.

Eleanor was born an infanta of Castile. She was the second child of King John II of Castile and his first wife, Maria of Aragon. She was named after her maternal grandmother. Eleanor's elder sister, Catherine, Princess of Asturias, died seven days after Eleanor's first birthday. Thus, the one-year-old infanta became heir presumptive to the throne. Her father had her recognised as successor to the kingdom and as Princess of Asturias by the Cortes of Valladolid shortly after her sister's funeral. The new Princess of Asturias received homage in the presence of her father, the King, in City of Burgos.

Princess Eleanor held this title and status for two months only. On 5 January 1425, she was displaced by the birth of a brother, the future King Henry IV of Castile. Now merely infanta and second-in-line to the throne again, Eleanor died the same year near the Cistercian monastery in La Espina.

Eleanor of Castile House of Trastámara Born: 10 September 1423 Died: 1425
Spanish royalty
Preceded by Catherine	Princess of Asturias; 1424–1425	Succeeded by Henry
