= Eleanor of Portugal =

Eleanor or Leonor of Portugal is the name of:

- Eleanor of Portugal, Queen of Denmark (1211–1231), daughter of Afonso II of Portugal and wife of Valdemar, co-King of Denmark
- Eleanor of Portugal, Queen of Aragon (1328–1348), daughter of Afonso IV of Portugal and wife of King Peter IV of Aragon
- Eleanor of Portugal, Holy Roman Empress (1434–1467), daughter of Edward I of Portugal and wife of Frederick III, Holy Roman Emperor
- Eleanor of Viseu, Queen of Portugal (1458–1525), aka Eleanor of Lancaster, wife of King John II of Portugal
- Eleanor of Austria, Queen of Portugal (1498–1558), wife of King Manuel I of Portugal
