= Catherine of Lancaster =

Queen of Castile and León from 1390 to 1406

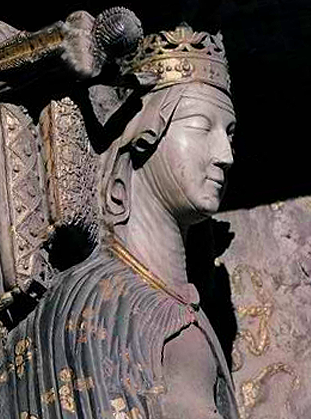
- Sculpture of Catherine atop her tomb at Toledo Cathedral

Queen consort of Castile and León
- Tenure: 9 October 1390 – 25 December 1406
- Born: 31 March 1373; Hertford Castle, Hertfordshire, Kingdom of England
- Died: 2 June 1418 (aged 45); Valladolid, Castile and León
- Burial: Cathedral of Toledo, Castile-La Mancha
- Spouse: Henry III, King of Castile (m. 1388; died 1406)
- Issue: Catherine, Duchess of Villena; Maria, Queen of Aragon; John II, King of Castile
- House: Lancaster
- Father: John of Gaunt, 1st Duke of Lancaster
- Mother: Constance of Castile

Arms of Catherine as Queen of Castile

Catherine of Lancaster (Castilian: Catalina; 31 March 1373 – 2 June 1418) was Queen of Castile by marriage to King Henry III of Castile. She governed Castile as regent from 1406 until 1418 during the minority of her son.

Queen Catherine was the daughter of John of Gaunt, 1st Duke of Lancaster, and his second wife, Constance of Castile (the eldest daughter and heiress of King Peter of Castile, who died at the hands of his half-brother Henry II). She was born in Hertford Castle, her father's chief country home, on 31 March 1373. Catherine became Queen of Castile through her marriage to Henry III.

== Marriage ==
After King John I of Portugal defeated King John I of Castile at the Battle of Aljubarrota, South Leiria, in 1385, fully establishing Portuguese independence, Catherine's parents, the Duke and Duchess of Lancaster, were encouraged to press their claim for the Castilian throne. In 1386, Catherine joined her parents in an expedition to Castile to claim the throne. England and Portugal entered into an alliance against Castile in 1386 and solidified their ties through the marriage of King John I and Catherine's half-sister, Philippa.

John of Gaunt had ruled Santiago de Compostela, Vigo, and Pontevedra with ease, but had to withdraw to Portugal in 1387 because of an unsuccessful invasion of León. It was then that he accepted the proposal of King John I of Castile, to marry Catherine to his son, the future Henry III, and that Constance, Duchess of Lancaster, should renounce all claims to the Castilian throne. A final treaty in regards to this proposal was ratified at Bayonne in Gascony on 8 July 1388. The marriage helped to restore a semblance of legitimacy to the Trastámara line. Furthermore, together with the Truce of Leulingham and the one made at Monção Municipality, the betrothal helped to end the Spanish period of the Hundred Years War.

On 5 August 1388, the 15-year-old Catherine announced that she entered into the marriage freely and fully accepted the treaty. The treaty had included a dower of the towns of Soria, Almazán, Atienza, Deza, and Molina. By 17 September 1388, Catherine was married to the nine-year-old Henry in Palencia Cathedral. Her husband took over the throne after the death of his father in 1390, but only in 1393 was he declared of age and began to rule. Catherine's only contribution to Henry's rule was the bearing of his three children and her devotion to the religious patronage of the Dominican Order. In September 1390, Catherine accepted the authority of the Avignon Papacy, under Antipope Clement VII and became a staunch supporter.

The couple's three children:

- Maria of Castile (1401–1458), who married Alfonso V "the Magnanimous", King of Aragon and Naples, without issue
- Catherine of Castile (1403/1406–1439), who wed as his first wife in 1420 Henry of Aragon, 4th Count of Alburquerque, 32nd Count of Ampurias and 35th Master of the Order of Santiago (1400-Calatayud, 1445), without issue
- John II (1405–1454), who succeeded his father as King of Castile.

== Widowhood ==
=== Regency with Ferdinand ===
Henry III died in 1406, and according to his will, his widow, Catherine, and his brother, Ferdinand I of Aragon were to be joint regents during John II's minority, sharing their power with a royal council. Of those three parties, Ferdinand was to be the one with the greatest share of power. However, the custody of John II was given to two nobles, Diego López de Zúñiga and Juan Fernandez de Velasco. Catherine prepared to defend herself and her household in a famous Spanish castle, the Alcázar of Segovia, because she was not willing to relinquish her one year old son. Ferdinand was eventually able to make a deal that allowed Catherine to maintain custody of her son.

Ferdinand ordered Mudéjars (Muslims living in Christian Spain) to wear a symbol; a blue moon on their clothing. They were not allowed to leave their homes, nor were they allowed to work or trade with Christians. The Jews, too, were not allowed to work or trade with Christians. This was an attempt to suppress religious minorities, which was supported by Catherine and only lasted until her death. Furthermore, tensions between the regents led to a division of rule. The royal council awarded Catherine control over the Northern part of the Kingdoms of Castile, and Leon.

As Catherine became increasingly involved in the wars of Ferdinand against Granada in the south, Castile's alliance with France suffered and she was able to strengthen her relations with Portugal, where her half-sister Philippa was queen, and with England, where her half-brother Henry IV ruled since 1399. Catherine and her half-brother fostered trade between Castile and England. Her international policies were beneficial to the Castilian communities, but her co-regents did not always act in their best interests. Because of Catherine's opposition to Ferdinand, she supported the position of Antipope Benedict XIII and initially spoke up against the Council of Constance (1414–1418).

=== Second regency ===
When Ferdinand died in 1416, Catherine's authority was reduced, because his rivals no longer supported her. The government became very conciliar. Catherine, sickly due to a stroke, relinquished the custody of her son.

There is one vivid account of Catherine towards the end of her life recorded by Fernán Pérez de Guzmán. It alludes to the fact that she probably inherited physical characteristics from her father, and that she was a sickly woman. He describes her as being very tall and fat, pink with white in her complexion and fair. He states that she moved as though she was a man. He also says that she was virtuous and reserved, in both her person and her reputation. She was said to be generous and magnificent in her ways, although she did play "favourites" and was greatly influenced by them. Despite her "favouritism", she was twice as likely to banish women from her household.

== Death and burial ==
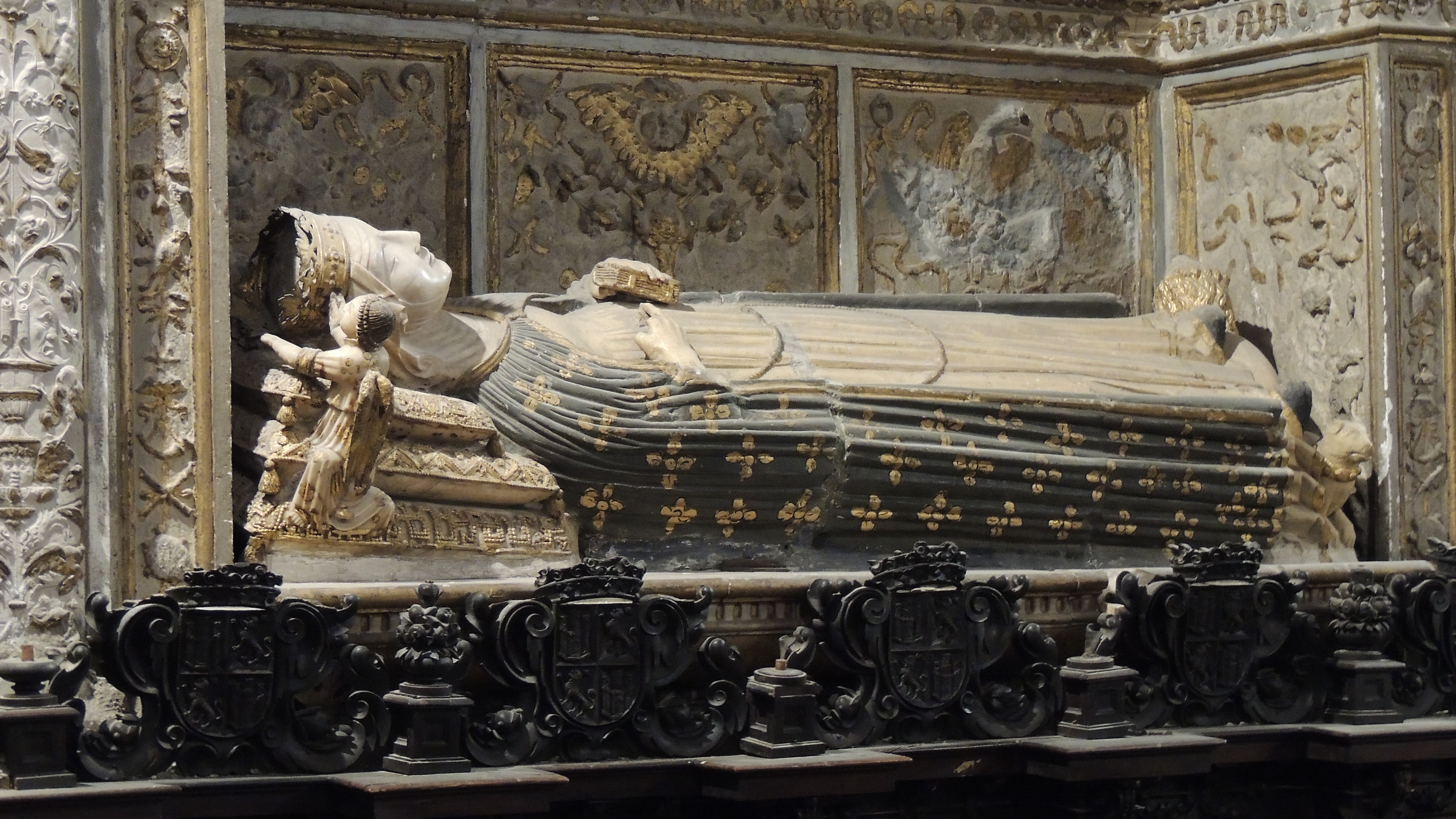
Catherine's tomb

Queen Catherine died at Valladolid on 2 June 1418, of a stroke, leaving her thirteen-year-old son at the mercy of self-interested courtiers. She is buried with her husband in the Capilla de los Reyes Nuevos in Cathedral of Toledo. Her monumental effigy shows her with a long face and a highly arched forehead.

Catherine of Lancaster's great-granddaughter Catherine of Aragon, the first of the six wives of Henry VIII, was named after her.

== Genealogy ==
Alfonso XI of Castile
Peter of Castile | Henry II of Castile
John of Gaunt | Constance of Castile | John I of Castile
Catherine of Lancaster | Henry III of Castile | Ferdinand I of Aragon

== Notes ==
Catherine of Lancaster House of Lancaster Cadet branch of the House of Plantagenet Born: 31 March 1373 Died: 2 June 1418
Spanish royalty
| Vacant Title last held by Beatrice of Portugal | Queen consort of Castile and León; 1393–1406 | Vacant Title next held by Maria of Aragon |
