= Henry, Duke of Villena =

Infante Henry
- Duke of Villena
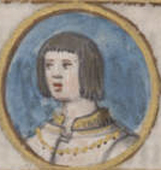

Count of Alburquerque
- Reign: 1435–1445
- Predecessor: Eleanor of Alburquerque

Count of Ampurias
- Reign: 1436–1445
- Successor: Henry of Aragon
- Born: 1400
- Died: June 15, 1445 (aged 44–45)
- Spouse: Infanta Catherine of Castile; Beatriz Pimentel
- Issue: Henry, 1st Duke of Segorbe
- House: Trastámara
- Father: Ferdinand I of Aragon
- Mother: Eleanor of Alburquerque

Infante Henry of Aragon (1400 – 15 June 1445), Duke of Villena, 3rd Count of Alburquerque, Count of Ampurias, and Grand Master of the Order of Santiago, was the third son of King Ferdinand I of Aragon and Eleanor of Alburquerque, and a member of the House of Trastamara. His brothers were King Alfonso V of Aragon and King John II of Navarre (not to be confused with John II of Castile).

== Early life ==
In 1409, following the death of Lorenzo Suárez de Figueroa, Grand Master of the Order of Santiago, Infante Henry was proclaimed the new Grand Master despite being a child of merely nine years, which his father secured with the intervention of Benedict XIII.

After the Compromise of Caspe, Henry's father, Ferdinand of Castile, became the King of Aragon, which led the family to move to this kingdom. With his subsequent death, in 1416, they returned to Castile. In that time, Henry's mother, Eleanor, ceded the County of Alburquerque in his favor, rendering him one of the most powerful figures in the Castilian nobility, together with his brother John.

== Struggle for power ==
Both Henry and John desired to control power in Castile, but that common project was marred by conflict. The enmity first arose from their desire to marry the Infanta Catherine of Castile, sister to John II of Castile, and their first cousin. The marriage meant obtaining the lordship of Villena and to stand in line of succession for the throne of Castile. John settled for a marriage to Blanche, heiress to the Kingdom of Navarre, but Catherine refused to wed Henry.

=== The Coup of Tordesillas ===
This refusal led Henry to take advantage of his brother's trip to Navarre to force the question of the marriage. In 14 July of 1420, Henry and his supporters broke into the palace of Tordesillas, kidnapping the King of Castile and taking him to Talavera de la Reina (event known as the coup of Tordesillas). Henry convened the Cortes, wed Catherine and the already planned wedding between John II and the infantes' sister, Maria, took place. This event would become the origin of a large scale civil war in Castile.

The king escaped in November, with the help of Álvaro de Luna, a man who would become the King's favorite and gain massive power and influence within the Castilian court.

In June of 1422, Henry was arrested for treason, due to his alleged correspondence with the King of Granada, which was forged. He was stripped of the title of Grand Master and all his assets were confiscated. He was imprisoned in the Castle of Mora.

Alfonso V, after his return from Naples, demanded Henry's release, threatening to invade Castile. Henry was released in October of 1425, and returned to Castile in the end of 1426.In September of 1427 Álvaro de Luna was exiled from the Court. Henry and his wife, Catherine, were awarded compensations and Henry was fully rehabilitated. However, shortly after, Álvaro returned to the court.

=== War with Castile and flight to Naples ===
In June of 1429, Alfonso V and John of Navarre crossed the Castilian border in front of an army hoping to cause an uprising in Castile. Henry joined them, managing to gather only a small amount of troops. Alfonso had never intended to wage war with Castile, wanting to negotiate.

Henry was punished by John II of Castile and lost all of his titles and properties. The assets of his wife, Catherine; of his brother, John, and his wife, Blanche and their child, Charles, were also later confiscated. Henry retreated to his estates and resisted Castile until his brother, Peter, was captured. He was released in exchange of Henry's fortresses and his surrender.

Henry and Peter then fled to the Kingdom of Naples, seeking to convince Alfonso to return to Iberia. However, Alfonso was occupied with his own political struggle for power. Alfonso's defeat at the Battle of Ponza and his imprisonment, together with his brothers, meant a major setback for his project.

=== 2nd War with Castile ===
In 1439, Henry and John returned to the Castilian Court. At that time, two factions emerged, one surrounding Álvaro de Luna, and a second opposing his authority. In October, Álvaro exited the Court for six months and Henry and John's assets were restored. Álvaro's exit was only temporary, which led the infantes to wage a war to fully deprive him of his power in the Court. Henry sparked the conflict, by taking Toledo in January of 1441. At last, him and his brother, John, entered Medina del Campo to take hold of the King. However Álvaro managed to escape.

The war restarted with Henry's military actions. He took Carmona, Córdoba and Alcalá de Guadaira and tried to take Seville. After the expiration of a truce, in 1445, John and Henry took Olmedo, and the Castilian troops laid siege to the city. This led to the First Battle of Olmedo, with the defeat of the infantes. Henry was wounded in battle and died of a stroke a few weeks later, in the 15th of June, in Calatayud.

== Marriages and issue ==
In October 1439, his wife Catherine died after suffering a miscarriage. Their marriage was childless.

The 1st of September of 1443, Henry married Beatriz de Pimentel (1416-1490), sister of the Count of Benavente, by whom he had one child:

- Henry of Aragon (1445–1522), 1st Duke of Segorbe, whose granddaughter Anne was the last member of the House of Trastámara.

== See also ==
- Castilian Civil War of 1437–1445

Henry, Duke of Villena House of Trastámara Born: 1400 Died: 15 June 1445
Spanish nobility
Preceded by Eleanor of Alburquerque	Count of Alburquerque; 1435–1445	Merged with the Crown
Preceded by Alfonso V of Aragon	Count of Ampurias; 1436–1445	Succeeded by Henry of Aragon
Honorary titles
Preceded by Lorenzo Suárez de Figueroa	Grand Master of the Order of Santiago; 1409–1445	Succeeded by Álvaro de Luna
