= Henry III of Castile =

King of Castile and León from 1390 to 1406

Henry III
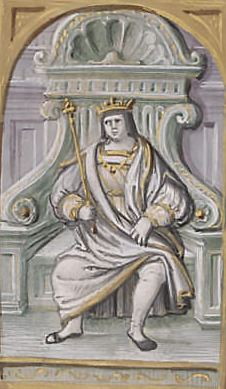
- Depiction in Alfonso de Cartagena's Liber Genealogiae Regum Hispaniae

King of Castile and León
- Reign: 9 October 1390 – 25 December 1406
- Predecessor: John I
- Successor: John II
- Born: 4 October 1379; Burgos
- Died: 25 December 1406 (aged 27); Toledo
- Burial: Cathedral of Toledo
- Spouse: Catherine of Lancaster (m. 1388)
- Issue Detail: Maria, Queen of Aragon; Infanta Catherine, Duchess of Villena; John II, King of Castile
- House: Trastámara
- Father: John I of Castile
- Mother: Eleanor of Aragon

Henry III of Castile (4 October 1379 – 25 December 1406), called the Suffering due to his ill health (Spanish: Enrique el Doliente, Galician: Henrique o Doente), was the son of John I and Eleanor of Aragon. He succeeded his father as King of Castile in 1390.

== Birth and education ==
Henry was born in Burgos, the capital of Castile, the first-born child of the recently crowned king John I of Castile and his wife Eleanor of Aragon. His younger brother Ferdinand grew up to become king of Aragon.

His upbringing was entrusted to Inés Lasso de la Vega, the wife of John Niño. As a child he was educated by Diego de Anaya Maldonado, Bishop of Tui-Vigo, who later became Archbishop of Seville. His tutor was Juan Hurtado de Mendoza el Limpio and his confessor was the Dominican Alonso de Cusanza, who later became Bishop of Salamanca and León.

== Prince of Asturias ==
At the time of his wedding, he received the title Prince of Asturias with the approval of the court of Briviesca. This title designated him as the heir apparent. He was the first person to hold this title, with earlier heirs to the throne being known as infantes mayores.

In 1390, his father considered abdicating in his favour to gain the recognition of the Portuguese, but he was dissuaded from this plan by his council. They were against it because of the damage caused to the kingdom by earlier similar decisions. However, in October of the same year, King John died in Alcalá de Henares by falling off his horse, and Henry was proclaimed king.

He assumed power on 2 August 1393, at the age of 13, during a tumultuous period of changes in the regency.

== Reign ==
Despite his nickname, King Henry III engaged in a vigorous foreign policy and manoeuvres during the first few years of the 15th century. He was able to pacify the nobility and restore royal power.

Henry III was supported by the aristocracy and displaced their most powerful relatives (such as Alfonso Enríquez and his aunt, Eleanor of Castile, Queen of Navarre). He repealed privileges granted by his predecessors at the Court of Castile, such as the alcabala (a heavy sales tax) and the right to attend the council. He increased the number of city magistrates and cleaned up the kingdom's economy. He reduced persecution of the Jews and passed various bills against the violence, which had become particularly bad by 1391.

During King Henry's reign, the Castilian fleet won several victories against the English; Henry III sent a naval fleet in 1399 that destroyed Tétouan in North Africa, a pirate base. In 1402, he began the colonisation of the Canary Islands, sending French explorer Jean de Béthencourt to do so. In 1396, he deflected a Portuguese invasion with an attack on Badajoz, finally signing a peace treaty with his brother-in-law, King John I of Portugal, on 15 August 1402.

Henry III also sent Payo Gómez de Sotomayor and Hernán Sánchez de Palazuelos, and later on 21 May 1403, Ruy González de Clavijo, as ambassadors to Timur to discuss the possibility of an alliance between the Timurid Empire and Castile against the Ottoman Empire. The latter recounted his travels in a book, Embajada a Tamorlán.

Henry III supported the papal pretension of Antipope Benedict XIII. He restarted the conflict against the kingdom of Granada, winning a victory at the Battle of Collejares, near Úbeda, which freed the town in 1406. However his untimely death later in that same year prevented him from completing this campaign. In 1406, King Henry built a pavilion (hunting lodge) on Mount El Pardo because of abundant game there. The lodge would later be transformed into the Royal Palace of El Pardo by Charles V, Holy Roman Emperor, who would rule as King of Spain.

Due to Henry III's poor health, he delegated part of his power to his brother King Ferdinand I of Aragon in the later part of his reign, who became regent while his son John II of Castile was too young to rule.

King Henry III died in the city of Toledo on 25 December 1406, while preparing a campaign against the Emirate of Granada.

== Tomb ==
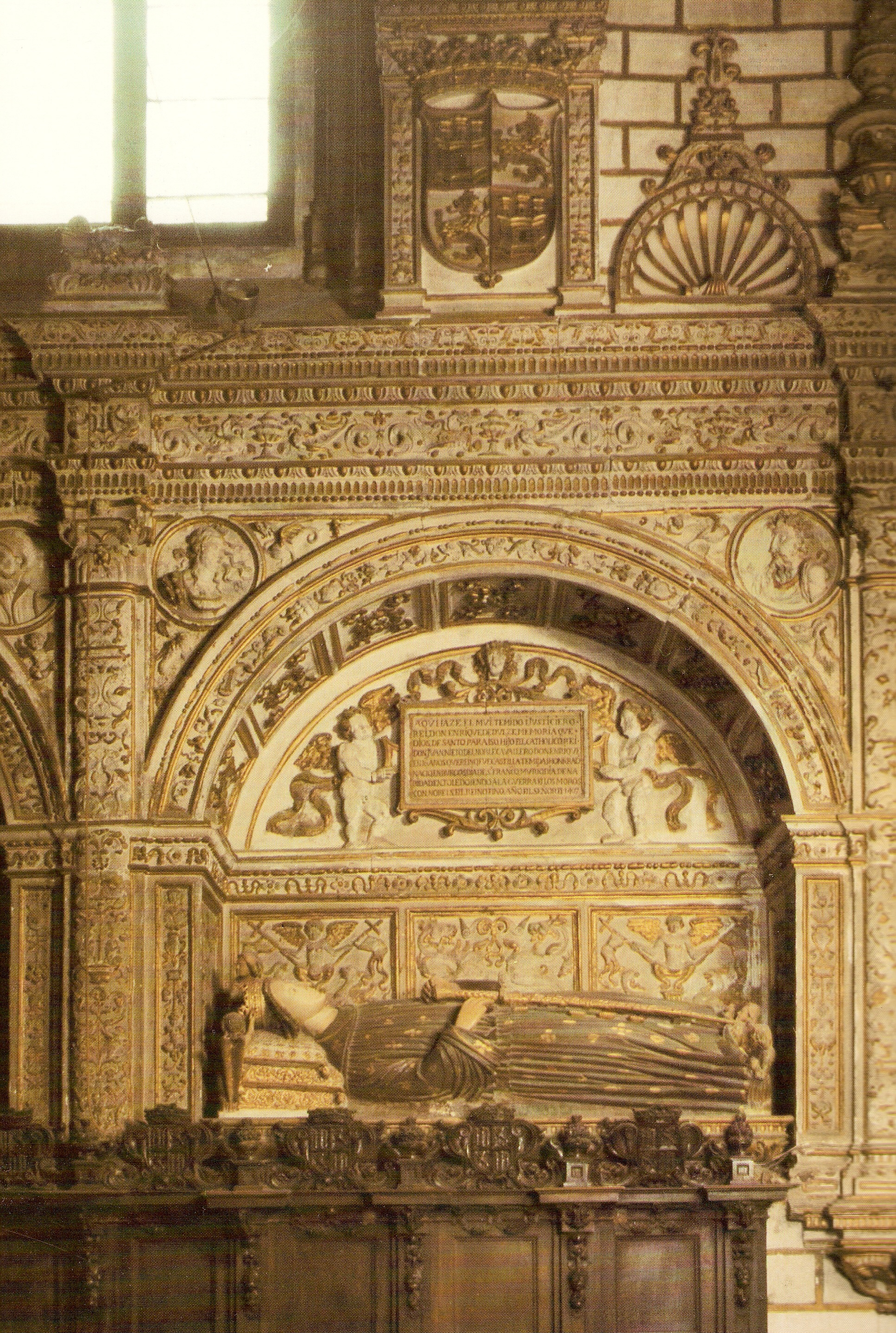
The tomb of Henry III of Castile. Chapel of the New Monarchs of Toledo.

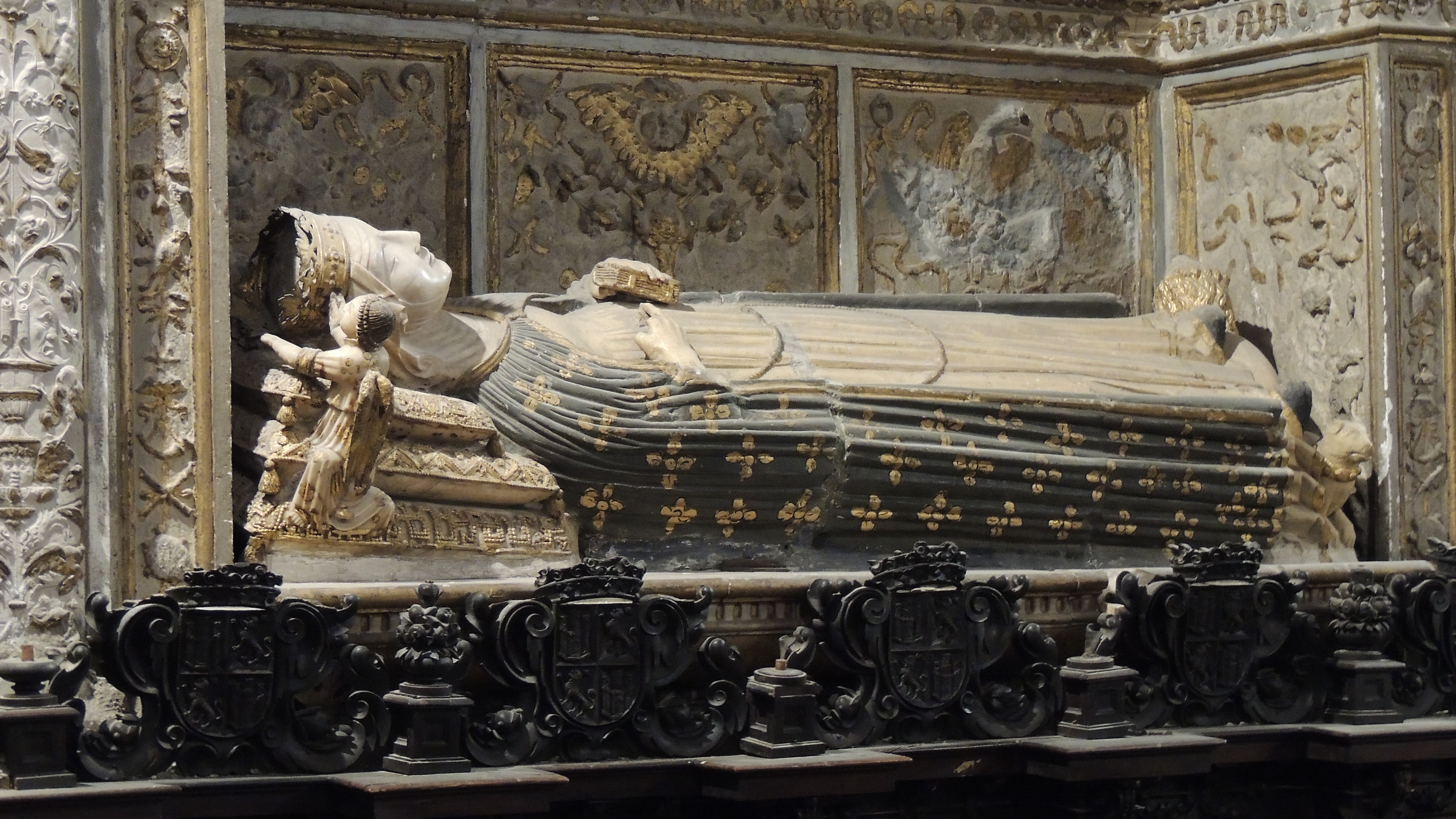
Catherine's tomb

After his death, Henry's body was taken to the city of Toledo, where he was interred in a tomb in the Chapel of the New Monarchs of the Cathedral of Toledo, and his remains are still there today. The tomb is located above the choir stalls on the Gospel side and is in the Plateresque style. The box part is decorated with the shields of Castile and León, and the lower interior has three panels decorated with trophies. Above the three panels two cherubs hold a plaque on which is engraved the Monarch's epitaph in medieval Spanish:

AQUI IACE EL MUI TEMIDO Y JUSTICIERO REI DON ENRIQUE DE DULCE MEMORIA QUE DIOS DE SANTO PARAISO HIJO DEL CATHOLICO REI DON JUAN NIETO DEL NOBLE CAVALLERO DON ENRIQUE EN 16 AÑOS QUE REINO FUE CASTILLA TEMIDA Y HONRRADA NACIO EN BURGOS DIA DE SAN FRANCISCO Y MURIO DIA DE NABIDAD EN TOLEDO IENDO A LA GUERRA DE LOS MOROS CON LOS NOBLES DEL REINO FINO AÑO DEL SEÑOR DE 1407.

Translation:

Here lies the much feared and righteous king Henry, of sweet memory, may God [give him] the Holy Paradise, [he was] son of the Catholic King John I and grandson of the noble knight Henry[.] In the 16 years he reigned, Castile was feared and honored[. He] was born in Burgos on the day of St Francis and died on Christmas Day in Toledo, going to war against the Moors with the kingdom's nobles, finishing AD 1407.

There is a recumbent statue of Henry III over the tomb, made in polychrome alabaster. Henry appears clothed in a Franciscan habit, although his hands are holding his sword in his girdle, which runs parallel to the Cordón de San Francisco. The king's head in his crown rests on three rich cushions, and his feet are bare. Four kneeling angels are at the corners of the statue.

== Marriage and issue ==
Shortly after his birth, he was promised to be married to Beatrice of Portugal, the heir to the Portuguese throne. This was part of a peace treaty between Castile and Portugal, who had signed a truce after the Ferdinand Wars. But this marriage did not happen. Instead, Beatrice married his father, who would instigate a war of succession with John of Aviz.

On 17 September 1388, as part of the Treaty of Bayonne, Henry married Catherine of Lancaster (1372–1418), the daughter of John of Gaunt, 1st Duke of Lancaster, and Constance of Castile, who was the elder daughter of King Peter. This ended a dynastic conflict and solidified the House of Trastámara. Their marriage ceremony took place in Palencia Cathedral and they had:

- Maria (1401–1458), wife of Alfonso V of Aragon and Queen of Aragon
- Catherine (1403–1439), wife of Infante Henry, Duke of Villena
- John II (1405–1454), King of Castile

== Ancestry ==
Ancestors of Henry III of Castile

8. Alfonso XI of Castile
4. Henry II of Castile
9. Eleanor of Guzman
2. John I of Castile
10. Juan Manuel, Prince of Villena
5. Juana Manuel
11. Blanca de La Cerda y Lara
1. Henry III of Castile
12. Alfonso IV of Aragon
6. Peter IV of Aragon
13. Teresa d'Entença
3. Eleanor of Aragon
14. Peter II of Sicily
7. Eleanor of Sicily
15. Elisabeth of Carinthia

== Bibliography ==
- González Dávila, Gil: Historia de la vida y hechos del rey don Henrique tercero de Castilla (The life and times of King Henry III of Castile) (1638)
- López de Ayala, Pedro: Crónicas de los Reyes de Castilla Don Pedro, Don Enrique II, Don Juan I, Don Enrique III. 2 v. Editorial Órbigo, S.L. ISBN 84-96966-50-X
- Previte-Orton, C.W. (1912). The Shorter Cambridge Medieval History. Vol. 2. Cambridge at the University Press.
- Suárez Bilbao, Fernando: Enrique III. Diputación Provincial de Palencia 1994 ISBN 84-8173-013-0
- Veas Arteseros, Francisco de Asís: Itinerario de Enrique III. Editum: Ediciones de la Universidad de Murcia 2003 ISBN 84-8371-400-0

Henry III of Castile House of Trastámara Born: 4 October 1379 Died: 25 December 1406
Regnal titles
Preceded by John I	King of Castile and León; 1390–1406	Succeeded by John II
Spanish royalty
New title	Prince of Asturias; 1388–1390	Succeeded by Maria
