= Maria of Aragon, Queen of Castile =

Queen of Castile and León from 1420 to 1445

Maria of Aragon
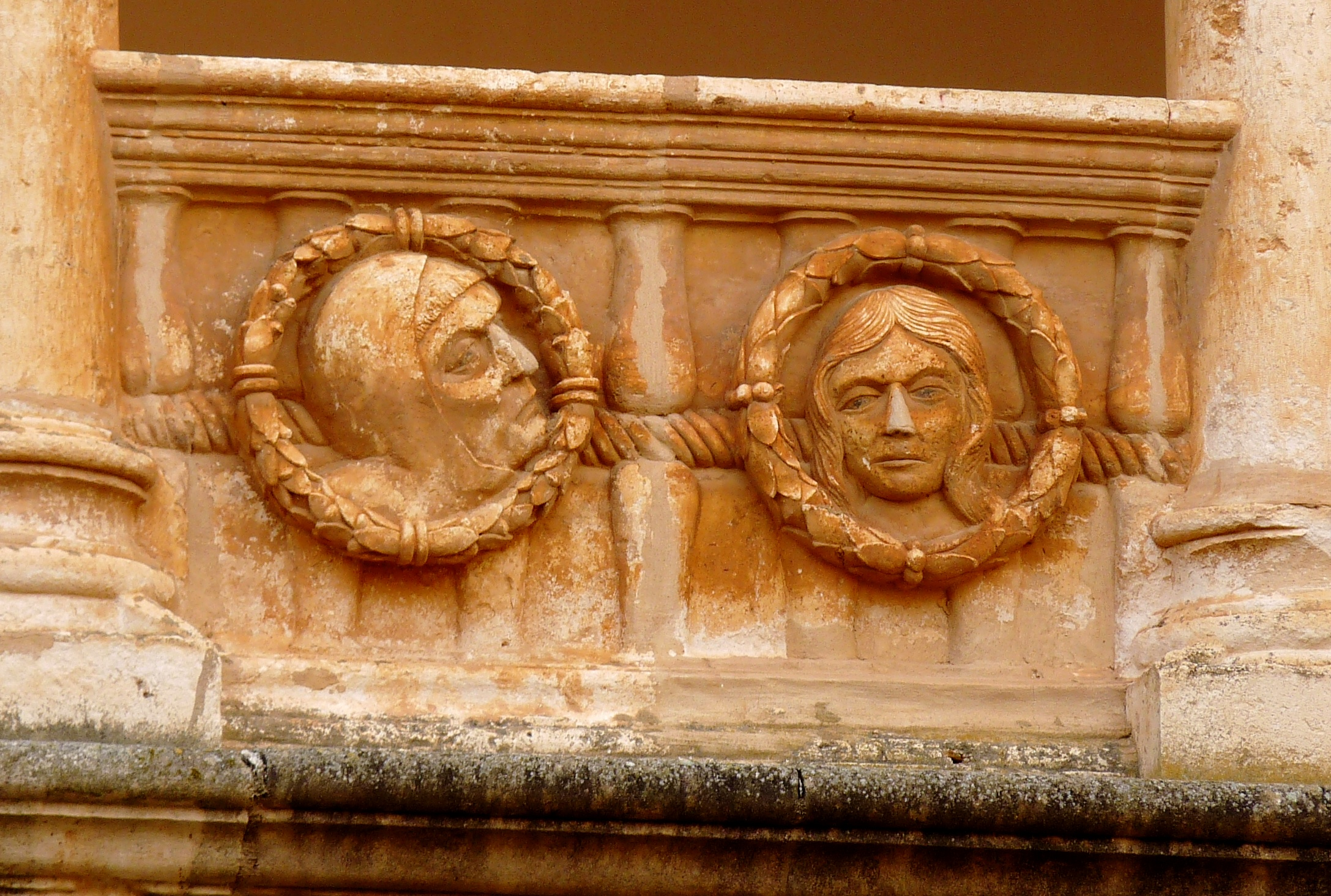

Queen consort of Castile and León
- Tenure: c. 1420–18 February 1445
- Born: 24 February 1403; Crown of Castile
- Died: 18 February 1445 (aged 41); Villacastín, Crown of Castile
- Burial: Santa María de Guadalupe, Spain
- Spouse: John II of Castile
- Issue Detail: Catherine, Princess of Asturias; Eleanor, Princess of Asturias; Henry IV of Castile
- House: Trastámara
- Father: Ferdinand I of Aragon
- Mother: Eleanor of Alburquerque

Maria of Aragon (24 February 1403 – 18 February 1445) was the Queen of Castile as the first wife of King John II from their marriage in 1420 until her death in 1445. She was the daughter of Ferdinand I of Aragon and Eleanor of Alburquerque.

== Life ==
Arms of Maria of Aragon

On 27 October 1418, Maria's engagement to her first cousin, King John II of Castile, was celebrated in Medina del Campo. The marriage was officialized on 4 August 1420, when John reached the age of majority. Maria was granted the incomes of the towns of Molina de Aragón, Huete, Atienza, Deza, Arévalo, and Soria.

Maria was occasionally politically active on behalf of her brothers, the princes of Aragon; in this wise the relationship between Maria and John was somewhat tense. After her death on 18 February 1445, her husband married Isabella of Portugal and they became the parents of Isabella I of Castile. Maria has no descendants today, her line having gone extinct within a few decades of her death.

== Children ==
Maria and John II of Castile had four children:

- Catherine, Princess of Asturias (5 October 1422–10 September 1424).
- Eleanor, Princess of Asturias (10 September 1423–22 August 1425).
- Henry IV of Castile (5 January 1425–11 December 1474). First married Blanche II of Navarre and later married Joan of Portugal.
- Infanta Maria (c. 1428–c. 1429).

== Ancestry ==
Maria's ancestors in three generations
Maria of Aragon	Father: Ferdinand I of Aragon	Paternal grandfather: John I of Castile	Paternal great-grandfather: Henry II of Castile
Maria of Aragon	Father: Ferdinand I of Aragon	Paternal grandfather: John I of Castile	Paternal great-grandmother: Juana Manuel
Maria of Aragon	Father: Ferdinand I of Aragon	Paternal grandmother: Eleanor of Aragon	Paternal great-grandfather: Peter IV of Aragon
Maria of Aragon	Father: Ferdinand I of Aragon	Paternal grandmother: Eleanor of Aragon	Paternal great-grandmother: Eleanor of Sicily
Maria of Aragon	Mother: Eleanor of Alburquerque	Maternal grandfather: Sancho Alfonso of Alburquerque	Maternal great-grandfather: Alfonso XI of Castile
Maria of Aragon	Mother: Eleanor of Alburquerque	Maternal grandfather: Sancho Alfonso of Alburquerque	Maternal great-grandmother: Eleanor de Guzmán
Maria of Aragon	Mother: Eleanor of Alburquerque	Maternal grandmother: Beatrice of Portugal	Maternal great-grandfather: Peter I of Portugal
Maria of Aragon	Mother: Eleanor of Alburquerque	Maternal grandmother: Beatrice of Portugal	Maternal great-grandmother: Inês de Castro

Maria of Aragon, Queen of Castile House of Trastámara Born: 24 February 1403 Died: 18 February 1445
Royal titles
Preceded by Catherine of Lancaster	Queen consort of Castile and León; 1420–1445	Succeeded by Isabella of Portugal
