= John II of Aragon =

King of Aragon from 1458 to 1479

John II
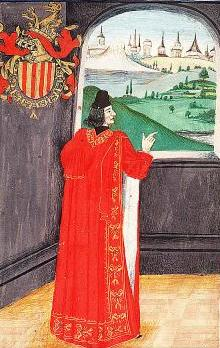
- John as a Knight of the Golden Fleece; Miniature from the southern Netherlands, 1473

King of Aragon
- Reign: 27 June 1458 – 20 January 1479
- Predecessor: Alfonso V
- Successor: Ferdinand II

King of Sicily
- Reign: 27 June 1458 – 10 June 1468
- Predecessor: Alfonso V
- Successor: Ferdinand II

King of Navarre
- Reign: 8 September 1425 – 20 January 1479
- Predecessor: Charles III
- Successor: Eleanor
- Co-ruler: Blanche I (until 1441)
- Contenders: Charles IV (1441–1461); Blanche II (1461–1464)
- Born: 29 June 1398; Medina del Campo, Crown of Castile
- Died: 20 January 1479 (aged 80); Barcelona, Principality of Catalonia
- Burial: Poblet Monastery
- Spouses: Blanche I of Navarre (m. 1420; died 1441) Juana Enríquez (m. 1447; died 1468)
- Issue Detail: Charles IV, King of Navarre; Blanche II, Queen of Navarre; Eleanor, Queen of Navarre; Ferdinand II, King of Aragon; Joanna, Queen of Naples; Illegitimate: Alfonso, Duke of Villahermosa; John, Archbishop of Zaragoza
- House: Trastámara
- Father: Ferdinand I of Aragon
- Mother: Eleanor of Alburquerque

John II (Spanish: Juan II, Catalan: Joan II, Aragonese: Chuan II and Basque: Joanes II; 29 June 1398 – 20 January 1479), called the Great (el Gran) or the Faithless (el Sense Fe), was King of Aragon from 1458 until his death in 1479. As the husband of Queen Blanche I of Navarre, he was King of Navarre from 1425 to 1479. John was also King of Sicily from 1458 to 1468.

== Biography ==
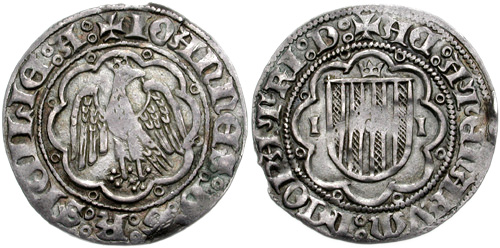
A Sicilian–Athenian–Neopatrian carlino of John II.

John was born at Medina del Campo (in the Crown of Castile), the son of King Ferdinand I of Aragon and Eleanor of Alburquerque. In his youth he was one of the infantes (princes) of Aragon who took part in the dissensions of Castile during the minority and reign of John II of Castile. Until middle life he was also lieutenant-general in Aragon for his brother and predecessor Alfonso V, whose reign was mainly spent in Italy. In his old age he was preoccupied by incessant conflicts with his Aragonese and Catalan subjects, with Louis XI of France, and in preparing the way for the marriage of his son Ferdinand with Isabella I of Castile which brought about the union of the crowns of Aragon and Castile and which was to create the Monarchy of Spain. His troubles with his subjects were closely connected with tragic dissensions within his own family.

John was first married to Blanche I of Navarre of the House of Évreux. In 1432, John II appointed Juan Vélaz de Medrano, Lord of Igúzquiza and Learza, as his royal chamberlain, a position he had previously held under Blanche's late father, Charles III of Navarre. By right of Blanche he became king of Navarre, and on her death in 1441 he was left in possession of the kingdom for his lifetime. But one son, Charles, given the title "Prince of Viana" as heir of Navarre, had been born of the marriage. John quickly came to regard this son with jealousy. After his second marriage, to Juana Enríquez, it grew into absolute hatred, being encouraged by Juana. John tried to deprive his son of his constitutional right to act as lieutenant-general of Aragon during his father's absence. Charles's cause was taken up by the Aragonese, however, and the king's attempt to make his second wife lieutenant-general was set aside.

There followed the long Navarrese Civil War, with alternations of success and defeat, ending only with the death of the prince of Viana, possibly by poison administered by his father in 1461. The institutions of the Principality of Catalonia, who had adopted the cause of Charles and who had grievances of their own, called in a succession of foreign pretenders in the ten years' Catalan Civil War. John spent his last years contending with them. He was forced to pawn Roussillon, his Catalan possession on the north-east of the Pyrenees, to King Louis XI of France, who refused to part with it.

In his old age John was blinded by cataracts, but recovered his eyesight with an operation (couching) conducted by his Jewish physician, Abiathar Crescas. The Catalan revolt was pacified in 1472, but until his death in 1479 John carried on a war, in which he was generally unfortunate, with his neighbor the French king. He was succeeded by Ferdinand, his son by his second marriage, who was already married to Isabella I of Castile. With his death and son's accession to the throne of Aragon, the unification of the realms of Spain under one royal house began in earnest.

== Marriages and issue ==
From his first marriage to Blanche of Navarre, John had the following children:

- Charles, Prince of Viana (1421–1461), married Agnes of Cleves (1422–1448), no legitimate issue.
- Joanna of Navarre (1423 – 22 August 1425)
- Blanche II of Navarre (1424–1464), married Henry, Prince of Asturias, no issue.
- Eleanor of Navarre (1426–1479), married Gaston IV, Count of Foix (1422–1472), had issue.

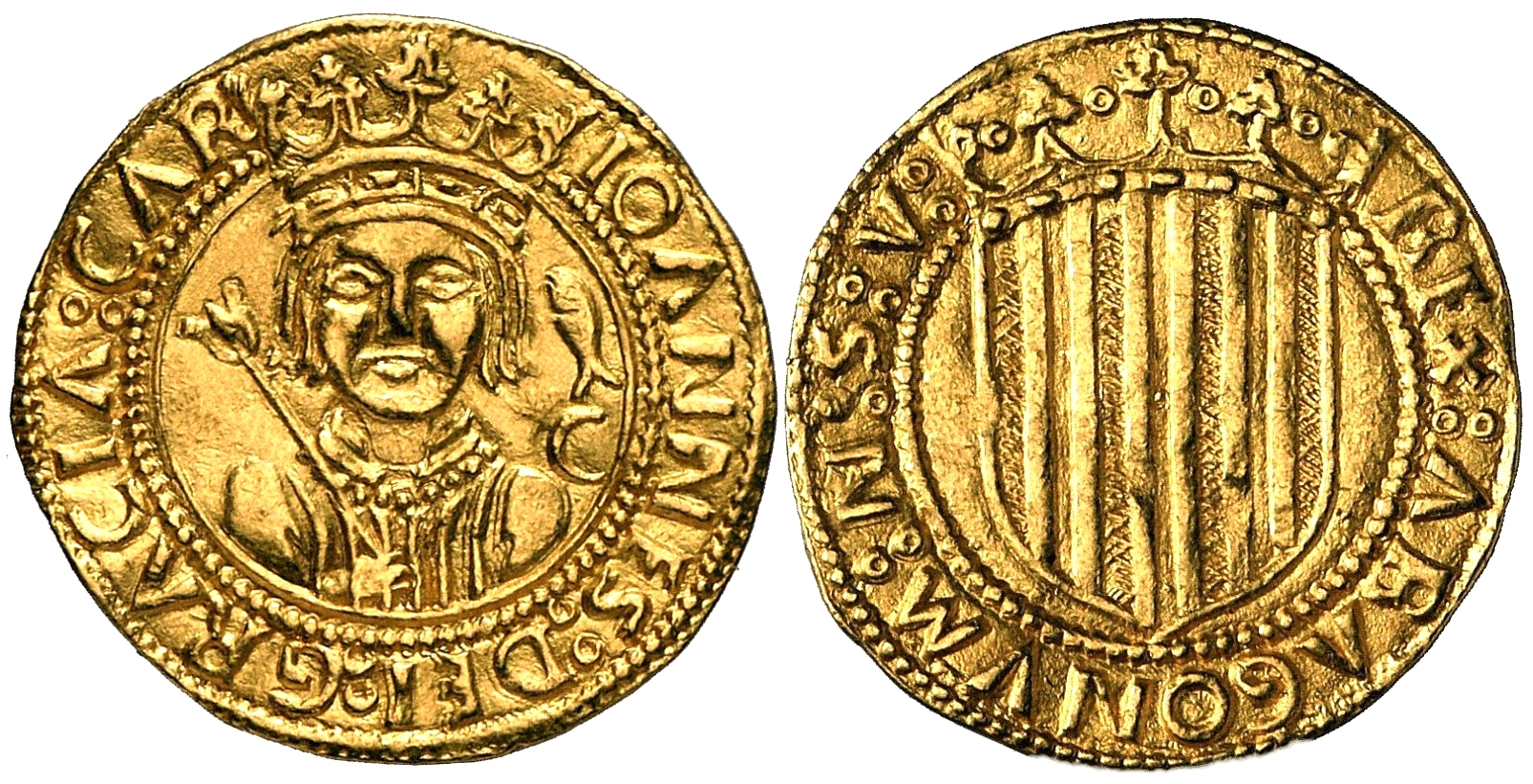
A ducat with John II's effigy

From his second marriage to Juana Enríquez, John had the following children:

- Ferdinand II of Aragon (1452–1516). Married Isabella I of Castile and later Germaine de Foix.
- Joanna of Aragon (1455–1517). Married Ferdinand I of Naples.

Illegitimate children:

- Alfonso de Aragón y de Escobar (1417–1495), Duke of Villahermosa
- Juan de Aragón (1440–1475), Archbishop of Zaragoza
- Felipe de Carrayos del Radona (Phillipe del Radona)

== Ancestors ==
Ancestors of John II of Aragon

8. Henry II of Castile
4. John I of Castile
9. Juana Manuel
2. Ferdinand I of Aragon
10. Peter IV of Aragon
5. Eleanor of Aragon
11. Eleanor of Sicily
1. John II of Aragon
12. Alfonso XI of Castile
6. Sancho Alfonso
13. Leonor de Guzmán
3. Eleanor of Alburquerque
14. Peter I of Portugal
7. Beatrice of Portugal
15. Inês de Castro

== See also ==
- Castilian Civil War of 1437–1445

== Sources ==
- Earenfight, Theresa (2015). "Trastamara Kings, Queens, and the Gender Dynamics of Monarchy". In Todesca, James (ed.). The Emergence of León-Castile c.1065–1500: Essays Presented to J.F. O'Callaghan. Ashgate. pp. 141–160.
- Livermore, H. V. (1966). A New History of Portugal (2nd ed.). Cambridge University Press.120
- Merriman, Roger Bigelow (1918). The Rise of the Spanish Empire in the Old and in the New. Vol. 2. The Macmillan Company.
- Ruiz, Teófilo F. (2007). Spain's centuries of crisis: 1300–1474. Wiley-Blackwell. ISBN 978-1-4051-2789-9.
- Scofield, Cora Louise (1923). The Life and Reign of Edward the Fourth, King of England and of France, and Ireland. Vol. 1. Longmans, Green, and Co.
- Woodacre, Elena (2013). The Queens Regnant of Navarre: Succession, Politics, and Partnership, 1274–1512. Palgrave Macmillan.
- Rivadeneyra. "Cronicas de los reyes de Castilla," Biblioteca de autores espanoles, vols. Ixvi, Ixviii. Madrid, 1845.
- Zurita, G. Anales de Aragon. Saragossa, 1610.
- Prescott W. H. History of the Reign of Ferdinand and Isabella. 1854.

John II of Aragon House of Trastámara Born: 29 June 1397 Died: 20 January 1479
Regnal titles
Preceded by Alfonso the Magnanimous	King of Aragon, Valencia, Majorca, Sicily, Sardinia and Corsica; Count of Barcelona; 1458–1479 1458–1468 (Sicily)	Succeeded by Ferdinand the Catholic
Preceded by Alfonso the Magnanimous	Count of Roussillon and Cerdagne; 1458–1462	Succeeded by Louis the Prudent
Preceded by Charles III	King of Navarre (jure uxoris); 1425–1441 with Blanche I	Succeeded by Charles IV de jure
Preceded by Charles III	King of Navarre de facto withholding the crown from Charles IV and Blanche II; 1441–1479	Succeeded by Eleanor
Spanish nobility
Vacant Title last held by Martin of Aragon	Duke of Montblanc; 1415–1458	Succeeded by Ferdinand II of Aragon
Preceded by James II of Urgell	Lord of Balaguer; 1418–1458	Succeeded by Ferdinand II of Aragon
Preceded by Hugh of Cardona	Duke of Gandia; 1433–1439	Succeeded by Charles of Viana
