= Eleanor of Aragon, Queen of Castile =

Queen of Castile and León from 1379 to 1382

Eleanor of Aragon
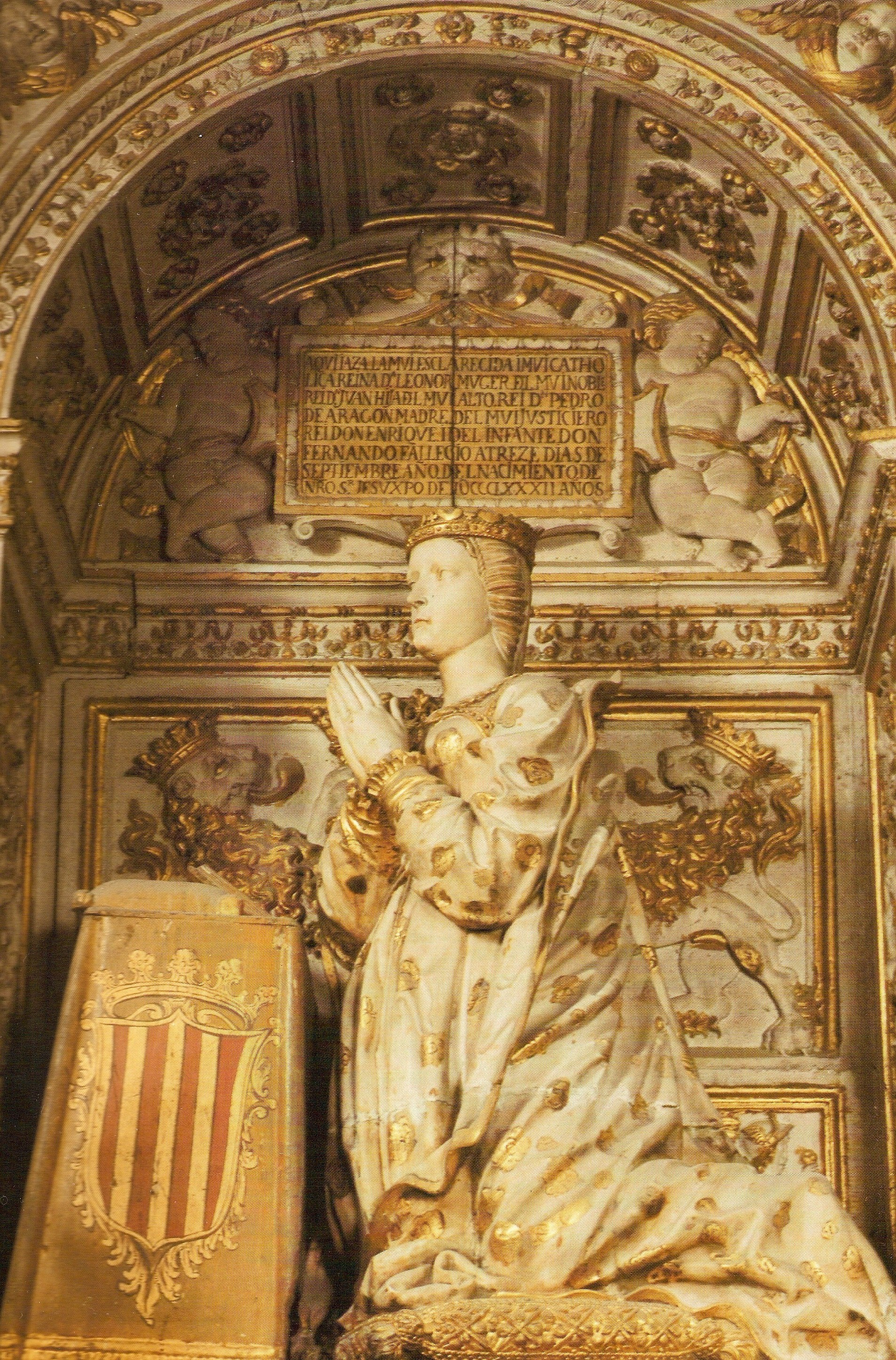
- A statue of Queen Eleanor praying at her Sepulcher

Queen consort of Castile and León
- Tenure: 1379–1382
- Born: 20 February 1358; Santa Maria del Puig, Crown of Aragon
- Died: 13 August 1382 (aged 24); Cuéllar, Crown of Castile
- Spouse: John I of Castile (m. 1375)
- Issue: Henry III of Castile; Ferdinand I of Aragon; Eleanor
- House: Barcelona
- Father: Peter IV of Aragon
- Mother: Eleanor of Sicily

Eleanor of Aragon (20 February 1358 – 13 August 1382) was the daughter of King Peter IV of Aragon and Eleanor of Sicily. She was a member of the House of Barcelona and Queen of Castile by her marriage.

== Family ==
Eleanor was the youngest child and only daughter of her father by his third marriage. Eleanor was a sister of John I of Aragon and Martin of Aragon. She was a half-sister of Constance, Queen of Sicily, Joanna, Countess of Ampurias and Isabella, Countess of Urgell.

== Marriage ==
At Soria on the 18 June 1375, Eleanor married John I of Castile. Her marriage was arranged as part of the arrangements for peace between Aragon and Castile agreed at Almazán on the 12 April 1374 and at Lleida on the 10 May 1375.

Eleanor and John were married for seven years, in which time they had three children:

1. Henry (4 October 1379 – 25 December 1406), succeeded his father as King of Castile
2. Ferdinand (27 November 1380 – 2 April 1416), became King of Aragon in 1412
3. Eleanor (b. 13 August 1382), died young

After seven years of marriage on 13 August 1382, Eleanor died giving birth to her daughter and namesake Eleanor, who died young. Eleanor's son Ferdinand later claimed his mother's rights on the Kingdom of Aragon when both of Eleanor's brothers died without surviving sons.

Coat of arms and shield of Eleanor of Aragon as Queen Consort of Castile

== Sources ==
- Previté-Orton, Charles William (1960). The Shorter Cambridge Medieval History. Vol. 2. Cambridge University Press.
- Louda, Jirí; MacLagan, Michael (1999), Lines of Succession: Heraldry of the Royal Families of Europe (2nd ed.), London: Little, Brown and Company

Royal titles
Preceded by Juana Manuel of Castile	Queen consort of Castile and León; 1379–1382	Succeeded by Beatrice of Portugal
