= John II of Castile =

King of Castile and León from 1406 to 1454

John II
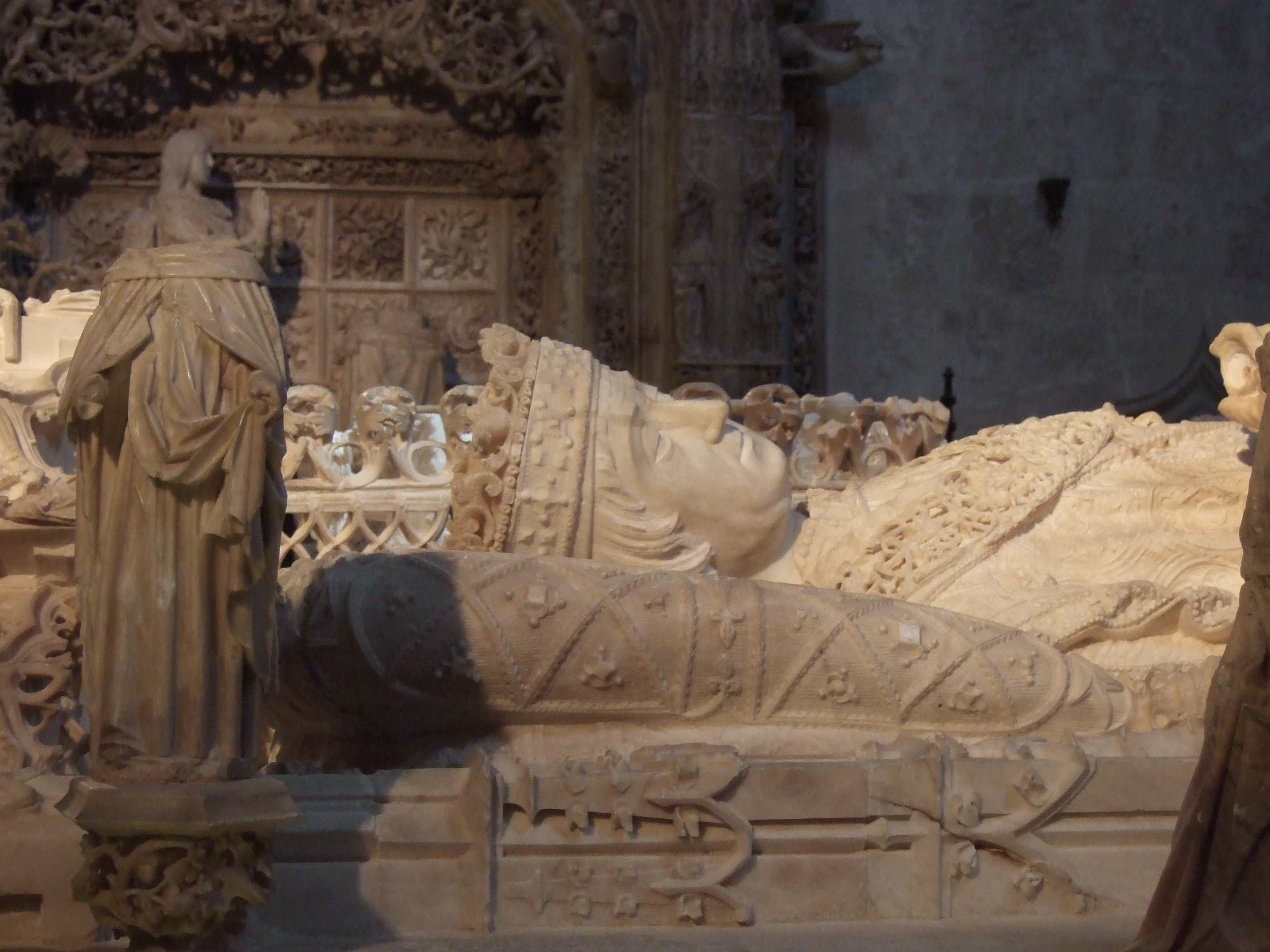
- Tomb of John II in the Miraflores Charterhouse

King of Castile and León
- Reign: 25 December 1406 – 20 July 1454
- Predecessor: Henry III
- Successor: Henry IV
- Born: 6 March 1405; Toro, Zamora
- Died: 20 July 1454 (aged 49); Valladolid
- Burial: Miraflores Charterhouse
- Spouses: Maria of Aragon (m. 1420; died 1445) Isabella of Portugal (m. 1447)
- Issue among others...: Catherine, Princess of Asturias; Eleanor, Princess of Asturias; Henry IV; Isabella I; Alfonso, Prince of Asturias
- House: Trastámara
- Father: Henry III of Castile
- Mother: Catherine of Lancaster

John II of Castile (Juan; 6 March 1405 – 20 July 1454) was King of Castile and León from 1406 to 1454. He succeeded his older sister, Maria of Castile, Queen of Aragon, as Prince of Asturias in 1405.

== Regency ==
John was the son of King Henry III and his wife, Catherine of Lancaster, a granddaughter of King Peter. Peter had been ousted by Henry III's grandfather King Henry II. John succeeded his father on 25 December 1406, and united in his person the claims of both Peter and Henry II. His mother and his uncle, King Ferdinand I of Aragon, were co-regents during his minority. When Ferdinand I died in 1416, his mother governed alone until her death in 1418.

== Personal rule ==
John II's reign, lasting 48 years, was one of the longest in Castilian history, but John himself was not a particularly capable monarch. He spent his time verse-making, hunting, and holding tournaments. His favourite, Álvaro de Luna, heavily influenced him until his second wife, Isabella of Portugal, obtained control of his feeble will. At her instigation, he dismissed and executed his faithful and able servant, an act which is said to have caused him much remorse. The relationship between Álvaro and Juan has been described as pederastic.

John II's Regents declared the Valladolid laws in 1411, which restricted the social activity of Jews. Among the most notable of the provisions were outlining that Jews must wear distinctive clothes and banned them from holding administrative positions. However, once John took control of the throne for himself in 1418, he (though likely influenced politically by de Luna) reversed such ordinances, favoring instead a more tolerant attitude toward the already battered Jewish population of Castile following the mass wave of conversions between 1391 and 1415.

In 1431, John placed Yusuf IV on the throne as the Sultan of Granada in the Moorish Emirate of Granada, in exchange for tribute and vassal status to Castile. This exchange is depicted in the short ballad the Romance of Abenamar.

He was "[T]all and handsome, fair-skinned and slightly ruddy... his hair was the color of a very mature hazelnut, the nose a little snub, the eyes between green and blue... he had very graceful legs and feet and hands."

John II was the single largest contributor to the continuing construction of the Alcázar of Segovia and built the "New Tower" known today as the "Tower of John II".

John II died on 20 July 1454 in Valladolid.

== Family and children ==
In 1418, John married Maria of Aragon, the oldest daughter of his paternal uncle, Ferdinand I of Aragon. The marriage produced:

- Catherine, Princess of Asturias (1422–1424), his heiress presumptive from her birth until her death
- Eleanor, Princess of Asturias (1423–1425), his heiress presumptive from the death of Catherine until the birth of Henry
- King Henry IV of Castile (1425–1474)
- Infanta Maria (1428–1429)

Of all their children, only the future Henry IV of Castile survived infancy. John was widowed in 1445 and remarried to Isabella of Portugal, daughter of Infante John of Portugal, with whom he had two children:

- Queen Isabella I of Castile (1451–1504)
- Alfonso, Prince of Asturias (1453–1468)

== See also ==
- Castilian Civil War of 1437–1445

== Sources ==
- Harvey, L. P. (1990). Islamic Spain, 1250 to 1500. Chicago: University of Chicago Press.
- Previte-Orton, C.W. (1912). "The States of Western Europe". The Shorter Cambridge Medieval History. Vol. 2. Cambridge: Cambridge University Press. pp. 872–910.

John II of Castile House of Trastámara Born: 6 March 1405 Died: 20 July 1454
Regnal titles
Preceded by Henry III	King of Castile and León; 1406–1454	Succeeded by Henry IV
Spanish royalty
Preceded by Infanta Maria	Prince of Asturias; 1405–1406	Succeeded by Infanta Catherine
