= Constance of Sicily (1324–1355) =

Regent of Sicily from 1352 to 1355

Constance of Sicily (Italian: Costanza or Constanca), (1324/1326 – 22 October 1355) was a Sicilian princess regent. She ruled the Kingdom of Sicily as regent in the name of her brother, King Louis, between 1352 and 1355.

She was the daughter of King Peter II and his wife, Elisabeth of Carinthia. Constance was the second-born child of Peter II and Elisabeth of Carinthia, but the first to survive to adulthood. She had nine siblings in total, including Louis the Child and Frederick IV of Sicily, who ascended to the throne of Sicily during their lives. Constance lived into her thirties without submitting to marriage.

== Early life ==
Constance never married, like her sister Euphemia, whether this was due to their duties to continue the Sicilian family dynasty at the service of their brothers, or to avoid marriage, is indeterminate. They also had the ability to escape the duties of marriage by joining religious orders. One source addresses Constance as Abbess Costanza. Instead of pursuing marriage, Constance spent much of her life educating her younger brothers in politics until they became of age to rule and take the throne. It is evident Constance and her sisters were strong-willed women dedicated to their family.

== Regency ==
There is little known of the inner workings of the Sicilian court in which Constance grew up except for the appearance of determined and strong-willed women who occasionally stepped in to exert their control over weaker and ill-intentioned members of the Sicilian court. Women, like Constance, played an important role in maintaining inter-family relations as they were often adept at diplomatic negotiation, acted like ambassadors in unofficial capacities, but could also exert great influence in official capacities as regents, like Constance.

Constance's regency in 14th century Sicily was marked by conflicts between noble factions as well as the black plague. Constance was regent during one of the most devastating periods in European history and could not afford to stand by as a mere figurehead. As regent and ruler in place of her underage brother, her decisions mattered. Her appearance as a strong ruler was of great importance admidst rivaling factions and a populace terrorized by the Plague. This likely aided her decision to remain unmarried.

Like the regents who came before her, however, Constance failed to maintain peace amongst the rivaling Sicilian nobles or keep war off Sicily's shores. Her records are brief and in their lack of volume suggest that Constance failed to make a lasting impact in Sicilian history.

=== Civil War ===
When Constance's father King Peter II died 15 August 1342, her uncle John of Aragon, Duke of Athens and Neopatra, became the vicar of the kingdom and regent to her four-year-old brother and heir to the throne, Louis. When John died on 3 April 1348, the regency was passed to Blasco Alagona the Younger, a Catalan nobleman and grand justiciar of the kingdom who had been the vicar's lieutenant since October 1342. Four years later in 1352, Constance took over the role as regent during the minority of her brother.

Tensions between the local noble Sicilian families and rivaling noble families, existed long before the birth of Constance and her time as regent. The Civil Wars that raged from the 1330s to the 1360s had long-lasting effects on institutions and economic life. The monarchy was short on resources to fight their enemies or influence factions to their side. Though the monarchy profited from grain sales, increasingly the barons came to control even the sale of grain. Barons increased their rights through alienation of fiefs, and the Monarchy tolerated the barons' growing power to use them as buffers against their enemies, the Angevins, but at a high cost. The chairmonte known as the 'Latin' faction, and their rivals, the 'Catalan' faction, waged civil wars within the kingdom over their private disputes.

Following Louis's accession as king in 1342, the Latins rebelled against the new regent but did not have permanent Angevin Success. In 1348, civil war broke out. On one side of the rivaling barons was the Alagona family of Catalan origin, and on the other side, the local noble Sicilian families of Palizzi and Chiaramonte. Infighting within the kingdom between cities was common, particularly between Messina and Palermo.

On 1 September 1350, an agreement was made between the warring barons to cease fighting until Louis had reached the age of majority.

When Louis turned fourteen, he wrote a correspondence to communicate his wish to assume responsibility of the government as king to the Catanian people. In June 1353, Constance and her brother Louis arrived in Taormina to meet with Blasco. As regent, and someone who aspired for peace within the kingdom, Constance arranged for a meeting between Blasco and Louis. According to one source, the meeting never occurred due to Chiaramonte protest. An agreement was later reached on 4 October 1353 in Messina.

By November 1353, Constance was confirmed from a document to have taken over the responsibilities of vicar after the death of her mother, Queen Elizabeth of Carinthia.

=== The Black Death ===
The Black Death arrived in the port of Messina in Sicily in October 1347. Disease was a problem in cities in the decades before the plagues arrival, made worse by an influx of peasant refugees, city finical burdens, and high crime rates. Many people believed the arrival of the Plague was an act of God's wrath upon sinful people. One account blamed the Genoese for bringing the Plague to Sicily because of their sins and blamed Messina for its hasty spread. This was due, in part, to the economic importance of port cities like Messina, where ships would arrive on the island bearing goods and people. Ships that bore plague afflicted passengers were not identified until it was too late, spreading the Plague to port cities across the island and the Mediterranean.

Constance, though not yet regent, had to contend with the effects of the Plague as it spread thought the island where her people regardless of age or sex, died after coming into contact with the Black Death. Homes were left empty, and entire cities were destroyed or abandoned. With the spread of the Plague, revenue from trade and other sources of wealth from agriculture declined further hurting the kingdom's economy. The high death toll, combined with the people's fear, lead the ruling family and Constance to advise her brother, Louis, at nine years of age, to grant all priests the power to absolve sins so that all who died of the Plague would reach heaven. Constance, as a member of the royal family with a King not yet of age, had to grapple with a dying citizenry worsening economic conditions, and continued rivaling between cities and barons.

== Death ==
In 1355, Eight years after the Black Death first arrived in Sicily, King Louis died of the Plague. Shortly after the death of her brother, Constance too died from the Plague. Constance during her life remained unmarried despite the expectation to do so. Her regency may have made marriage difficult for her position, or she may have chosen to put her family before herself. Constance did not create lasting change within Sicilian politics but still managed to exert her influence through diplomatic negotiation as regent and sister to Louis, the King of Sicily during her reign. Her position as regent of Sicily was taken over by her sister Euphemia, who kept it until 1356 when their brother Fredrick IV came of age.
