= Constance of Sicily =

Constance of Sicily can refer to:

- Constance I of Sicily (1154–1198)
- Constance II of Sicily (1249–1302)
- Constance of Sicily, Queen of Italy, died 1138
- Constance of Sicily, Queen of Cyprus (1304–1344)
- Constance of Sicily, Regent of Sicily, (1324–1355)
- Constance of Aragon, Queen of Sicily (1343–1363)

== See also ==
- Constance of Aragon (disambiguation)
