= Treaty of Villeneuve =

The Treaty of Villeneuve (1372) was the definitive agreement that ended the dispute between the House of Anjou and the House of Barcelona over the Kingdom of Sicily that began ninety years earlier in 1282. Its final form was approved by Pope Gregory XI in a bull issued at Villeneuve-lès-Avignon on 20 August 1372, and it was ratified by Queen Joan I of Naples and King Frederick IV of Sicily (Note: He is sometimes called "Frederick III", since he was only the third Frederick to rule Sicily. However, his grandfather, Frederick II, called himself Fredericus tercius (Frederick the Third), since he was the third son of his father. Thus, some historians prefer "Frederick IV" for clarity. The first Frederick to rule Sicily was the Emperor Frederick II.) on 31 March 1373 at Aversa, in Joan's kingdom, in front of the papal legate, Jean de Réveillon, Bishop of Sarlat.

== Background ==
In 1266, Charles, Count of Anjou, took the Kingdom of Sicily by force at the invitation of the pope. The kingdom at that time included the island of Sicily and all of southern Italy. In 1282, a revolt broke out against the French on Sicily, the so-called Sicilian Vespers. King Peter III of Aragon, who claimed the kingdom as his inheritance through his wife, took advantage of the situation and invaded the island. The protracted War of the Vespers only ended in 1302 with the Peace of Caltabellotta. The treaty divided the kingdom in two: the Kingdom of Sicily (regnum Siciliae) was restricted to the mainland and continued to be ruled by the House of Anjou, while the island of Sicily itself became the Kingdom of Trinacria (regnum Trinacriae) under the rule of Peter's son Frederick III. The treaty dictated that Trinacria was to pass to Anjou after Frederick's death, but it was ignored and the House of Barcelona was still in control of it in 1372, despite decades of intermittent warfare. Contemporaries distinguished between "Sicily on this side of and beyond the lighthouse" (Sicilia citra et ultra Pharum), referring to the Punta del Faro that marked the narrowest width of the Straits of Messina between the island and the mainland. The Italian terms were al di qua del Faro and di la del Faro. Modern historians prefer to label the island kingdom Sicily, and its mainland counterpart the Kingdom of Naples, after its capital city.

== Negotiations ==
Negotiations to resolve the Sicilian question were resumed in 1371, mediated by the Chiaramonti, the most prominent aristocratic family supporting the Aragonese claim in Sicily. In January 1372, Joan and Frederick signed a preliminary agreement without the approval of Gregory. In February, King Peter IV of Aragon and his queen, Eleanor, sister of Frederick IV, appealed to Pope Gregory, as suzerain over the old, unified Kingdom of Sicily, to invest Eleanor as queen of the island on the grounds that Frederick was incompetent to rule. The Aragonese monarchs even claimed that the Sicilian barons had requested Eleanor be their queen. Although Gregory feared Aragonese intervention, he was more interested in obtaining the military assistance of Naples against his rival Bernabò Visconti, who was meanwhile seeking the alliance of Frederick of Sicily. Some sources even describe the initiative for the settlement as coming from Gregory. In February, the pope proposed that Frederick marry Antoinette des Baux (Antonietta del Balzo), the daughter of Duke Francis of Andria, one of the leading magnates of Joan's kingdom, to seal the peace between the rivals.

In the second half of 1372, Gregory sent Jean de Réveillon to Naples to sound out Queen Joan about the proposed settlement. Gregory was trying simultaneously to preserve his right to preside over a regency in Sicily, to preserve the church's freedom from secular interference and to open up Italians markets to Sicilian grain once the papal interdict on Sicily was lifted. He insisted that Frederick should do homage and swear fealty to him as well as to Joan. In this way, the fiction of a unified Kingdom of Sicily could be retained—since the ruler of the island was a vassal of the ruler of the mainland—and the papacy's independent right to interfere in Sicily prevented its domination by the House of Anjou—to the comfort of Peter and Eleanor of Aragon.

== Terms ==
The other terms of the treaty approved on 20 August 1372 were that, every year on the Feast of Saints Peter and Paul (29 June), Frederick was to pay a tribute of three thousand ounces of gold, equivalent to about 15,000 florins; he was to supply ten war galleys to the Neapolitan fleet; and he owed Joan servitium (military service), which in practice meant a loan of troops to her army. In return, as per the preliminary agreement, Joan promised not to support or give shelter to any rebel against Frederick, and to intercede with the pope to have the interdict on Sicily lifted and Frederick and his supporters absolved. Gregory's bull of ratification of affirmed the right of Frederick's daughter Mary and her descendants to inherit, but since Sicily was regarded a wholly new kingdom, no other relatives of Frederick (like his sister) had any rights in it. Frederick was to take the title "King of Trinacria", as in the treaty of 1302, and Joan had the sole right to the title "Queen of Sicily". The main difference between the agreement confirmed at Villeneuve and that reached at Caltabellotta was that in the former the cession of Sicily was in perpetuity.

After the settlement, Bertrand du Mazel was sent to Sicily as papal nuncio. Joan swore to uphold the treaty on 31 March 1373. On 26 November 1373, Frederick married Antoinette at Messina, in his kingdom. On 17 December 1373 he swore to the treaty, and on 17 January 1374 he did homage and swore fealty to the pope through the person of the nuncio, who in turn revoked the interdict in December 1374. Although the pope had taken to calling Frederick regens insule Trincalie ("ruler of the island of Trinacria"), he could now call him rex (king). Frederick's subinfeudation—he became a vassal of Joan, who was a vassal of the Holy See—has been seen as humiliating, while other historians argue that his status was enhanced, since by the treaty of Villeneuve he became indisputably sovereign over Sicily. In any case, he soon ignored the annual tribute and the repudiation of the Sicilian title, as did his successors. In 1442, Alfonso I of Sicily inherited Naples and assumed the title rex Siciliae citra et ultra Farum (King of Sicily on this side and beyond the lighthouse). In 1503, Ferdinand II modified this to rex Utriusque Siciliae (King of Both Sicilies), and this title continued to be used down to the demise of the Kingdom of the Two Sicilies in 1860.
