= Louis, King of Sicily =

King of Sicily from 1342 to 1355

Louis the Child
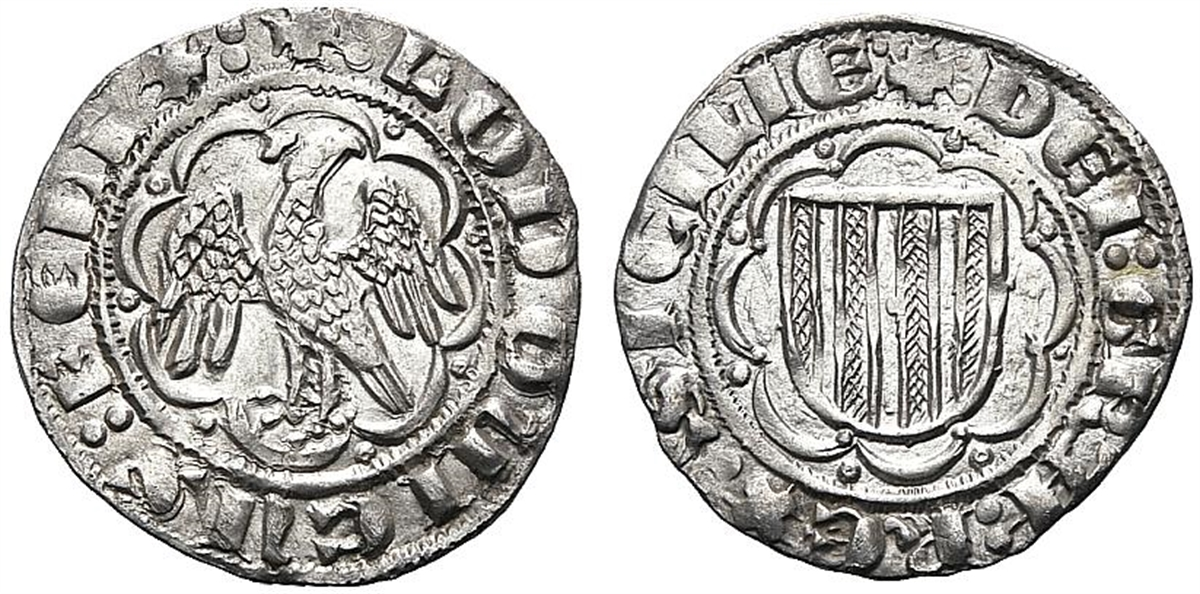
- Pierreale minted for Louis

King of Sicily
- Reign: 15 August 1342 – 16 October 1355
- Predecessor: Peter II
- Successor: Frederick IV
- Born: 4 February 1338; Catania, Kingdom of Sicily
- Died: 16 October 1355 (aged 17); Castello Normanno, Aci Castello
- Burial: Catania Cathedral
- Issue: Antonio, Lord of Cocentaina; Louis, Lord of Tripi
- House: Barcelona
- Father: Peter II of Sicily
- Mother: Elizabeth of Carinthia

Louis the Child (Italian: Ludovico or Luigi; 4 February 1338 – 16 October 1355) was King of Sicily (also known as "Trinacria") from 15 September 1342 until his death. He was a minor upon his succession, and was under a regency until 1354. His actual rule was short, for he died in an outbreak of plague the next year. His reign was marked by civil war.

== Birth and succession ==
Born in Catania, Louis was the son of King Peter II and Elisabeth of Carinthia. On the day of his birth, his father announced him as his heir in a proclamation to the municipal governments (universitates) of the realm. Louis was the first male child of Peter since the death of the firstborn, Frederick, in 1325. On 12 February, Peter issued a privilege to the city of Catania exempting it from the payment of the customary hospitality to the royal court. He also credited the intervention of Catania's patron saint, Agatha, on whose feast the child was born, for the successful delivery of a boy.

Louis was only four years old when his father died on 15 August 1342, and he was not immediately given the title of king. His uncle, Marquis John of Randazzo, already Peter's second-in-command as vicar, assumed the regency. During his father's lifetime, Louis was called primogenitus (first born) and infans (royal prince, i.e. infante). After his father's death and before his own coronation, he was titled successor. On 10 September John ordered the citizens of Palermo to nominate their representatives to swear the oath of fealty at Louis's coronation. Louis was crowned in the cathedral of Palermo on 15 September and thereafter he bore the title of king (rex).

== Early reign ==
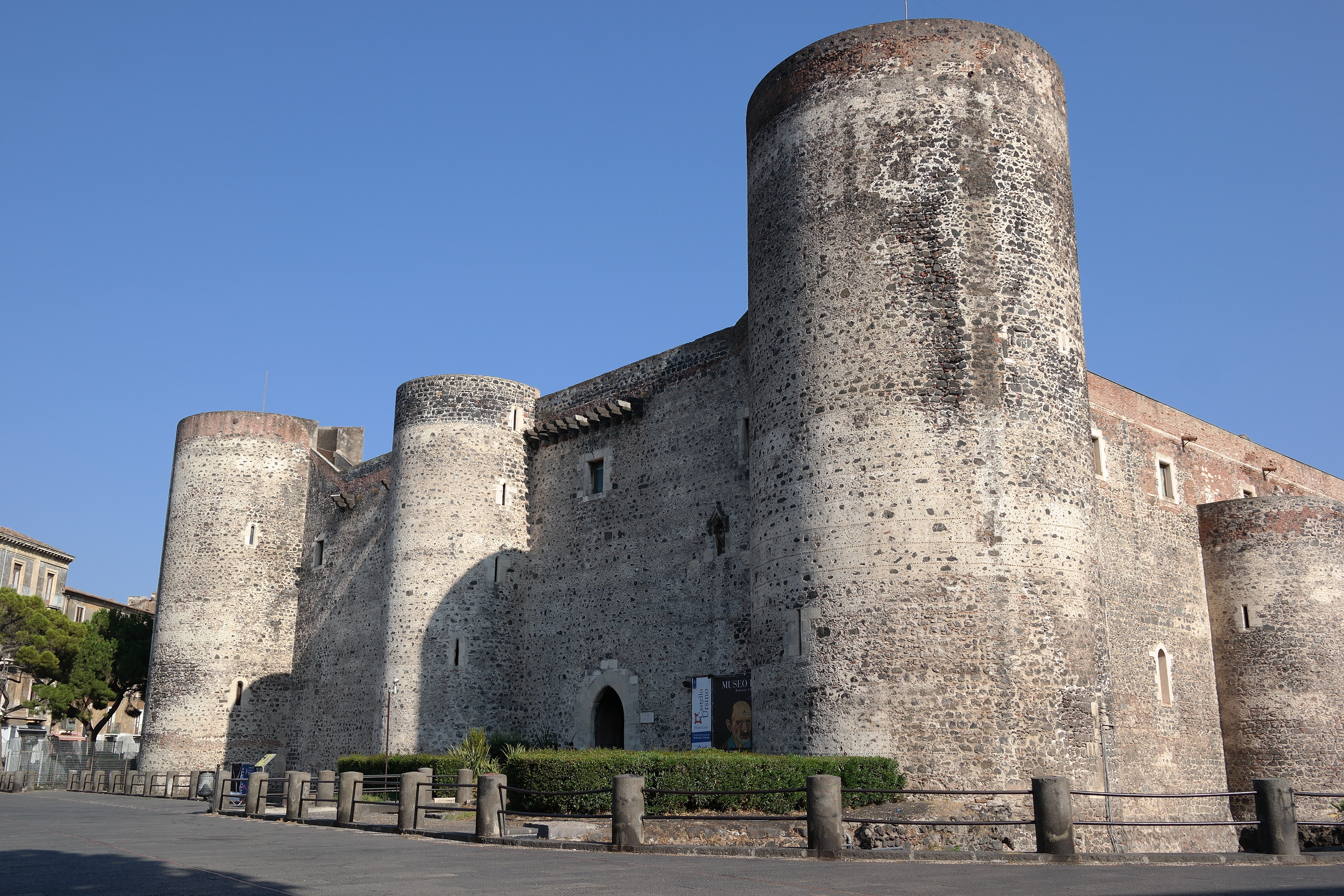
The Castello Ursino, where the peace of Catania was signed in 1347 and Louis's primary residence from June–November 1353

After his coronation, Louis lived at Catania from October 1342 until at least March 1343. Towards the end of 1344 negotiations were begun to marry Louis to Constance, the newborn daughter of Peter IV of Aragon. In June 1346 an ambassador from Louis I of Hungary arrived proposing a marriage between Louis and one of the Hungarian king's relatives.

On 7 November 1347 Sicily concluded a peace treaty at Catania with the Kingdom of Naples, which claimed the island of Sicily. The latter's independence was preserved, but Louis was required to take the title king of "Trinacria", an ancient name for Sicily. The treaty never received the necessary ratification of Pope Clement VI. After the death of John of Randazzo on 3 April 1348, the regency passed by his testament to Blasco II de Alagona, a Catalan nobleman who was already the grand justiciar and had been John's lieutenant since October 1342. In May 1348 Louis was residing in Messina when he confirmed the succession of John's son Frederick to the duchies of Athens and Neopatria and the marquisate of Randazzo.

== Civil war ==
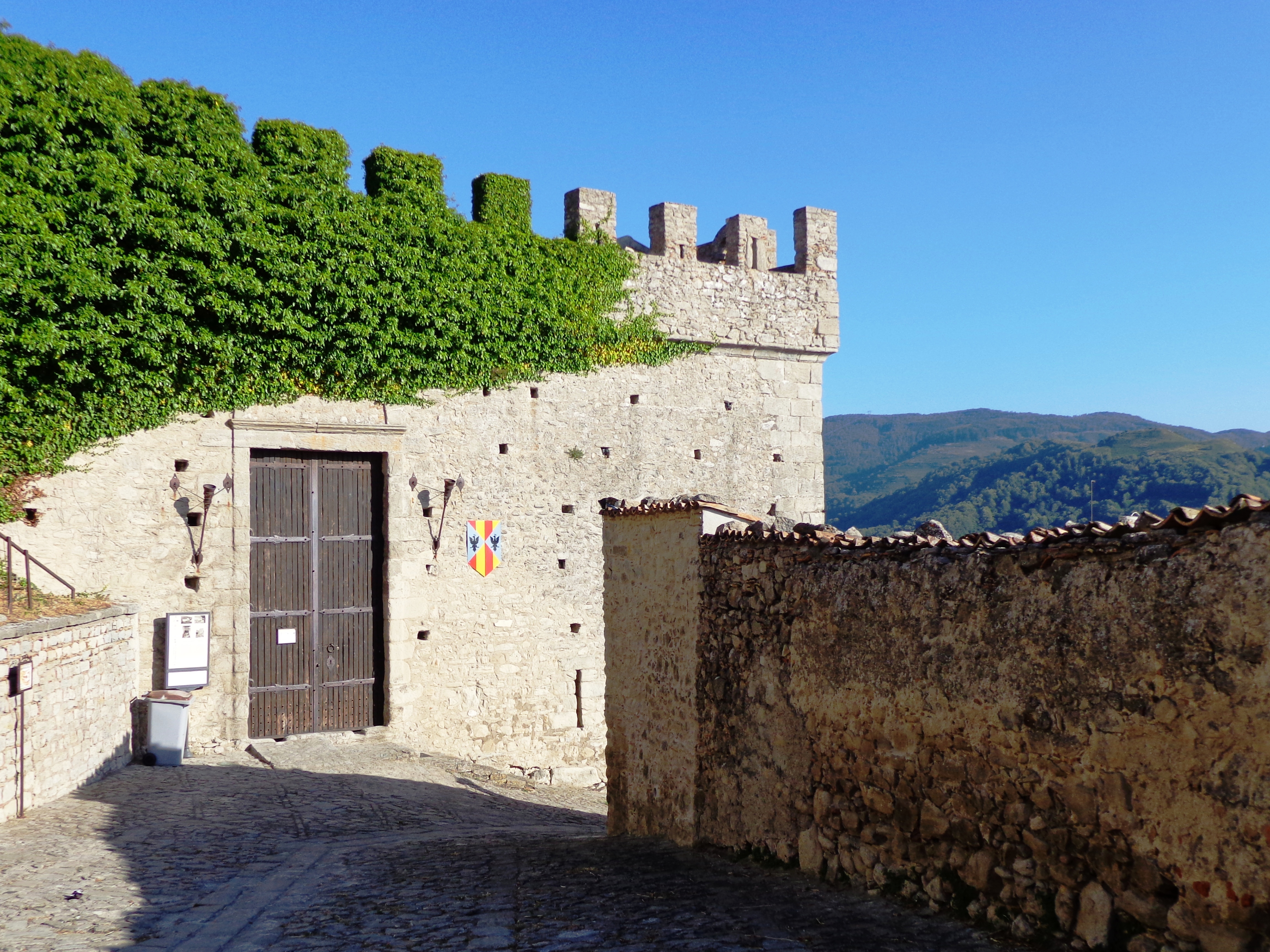
Louis was at the castle of Montalbano Elicona in November 1348, when Matteo Palizzi took over his guardianship

=== Guardianship of Palizzi ===
In the first half of June 1348, Count Matteo Palizzi returned from exile in Pisa. This act spurred the rivalry between the local Sicilian nobility (the families of Chiaramonte, Palizzi and Scaloro degli Uberti) and that of Catalan origin (the families of Peralta, Alagona and Ventimiglia), which eventually degenerated into civil war. The Sicilian families are sometimes called filoangioini (pro-Angevin, the house that ruled Naples) and the Catalans filoaragonesi (pro-Aragonese). Initially, Blasco sent Louis to Catania, but the court stopped at Taormina early in November and then moved to the castle of Montalbano Elicona. From there the queen mother made contact with Matteo, who was at Messina, and made him guardian of the young king.

By the end of the year, open warfare had broken out between the two camps. Louis's movements can be traced during the period of civil war, in which his mother sided with the pro-Angevin (Neapolitan) party. He was at Lentini from late March through April 1349 and at Augusta in May and early June. Around this time, between May and July, the queen mother died and her role was taken up by Louis's older sister, the abbess Constance. From late June through July Louis was with the army besieging Catania. By 22 July Louis had returned to Lentini. In September and October he was at Castrogiovanni, in November at Agira and in December at Messina.

An armistice was signed on 10 September 1350 in the king's presence. Both parties agreed to suspend hostilities until the king attained his majority and could judge the dispute. On 23 February 1352, after Louis had turned fourteen, Matteo pushed him to write a letter to the people of Catania declaring his intention to begin his personal rule. Blasco denounced the letter and sent ambassadors to Louis's court on 22 August. Peace was finally concluded in October.

=== Vicariate of Constance ===
On 9 June 1353 Louis left Messina in the company of the Chiaramonte, his supporters, to put down the revolt of Castroreale. At Taormina he received the homage of Count Enrico Rosso, who nevertheless refused to help him put down the revolt. On 13 June the king was on the plain of Milazzo, but he had soon returned to Taormina, where the Chiaramonte prevented him from meeting with the nominal regent, Blasco, in spite of the accord that he been reached through the intervention of his sister Constance, who was also with him. By the end of June he had returned to Messina to attend the burial of his brother John (died 22 June) in the cathedral there.

Support for the king had been slipping among his erstwhile allies, and on 17 July a popular riot in the city of Messina opened the gates to the armed forces of Enrico Rosso and Count Simone Chiaramonte. They demanded that Louis hand over his guardian, Matteo Palizzi, which he refused on 19 July. The palace was invaded but, while Matteo was found and killed, the king escaped. He boarded a Catalan ship and on 29 July arrived at Catania, where he joined his new allies under Blasco de Alagona. The king moved into the Castello Ursino.

On 2 October, Louis and Blasco led a force against Milazzo, but were repulsed and retreated to Catania on 24 October. On 8 November Louis declared the Chiaramonte traitors. A royal charter from 10 November indicates that at some point the office of vicar was transferred to Constance. Louis's subsequent attempts to break out from Catania were failures. On 15 November he entered the fortress at Agira and then moved on to Calascibetta, but he could not take Castrogiovanni and was forced to return to the safety of Catania by 28 November. A few days later he ventured to Taormina, but had returned to Catania by 4 December.

== Neapolitan invasion and death ==
In April 1354, the Neapolitans, with Grand Seneschal Niccolò Acciaiuoli at the head of a small fleet, invaded Sicily and subjugated Palermo and most of the interior in alliance with the Chiaramonte and the other filoangioini families. Only Catania and Messina remained under Louis's control, that is, with the Catalan (filoaragonese) faction. Fortunately for Louis, the new Neapolitan king, Louis I, refused to provide the required reinforcements and supplies to maintain the invasion. In May the king of Sicily (Trinacria) sent an ambassador to Naples to protest the invasion. On 4 June he sent out an embassy to Peter IV of Aragon to request assistance.

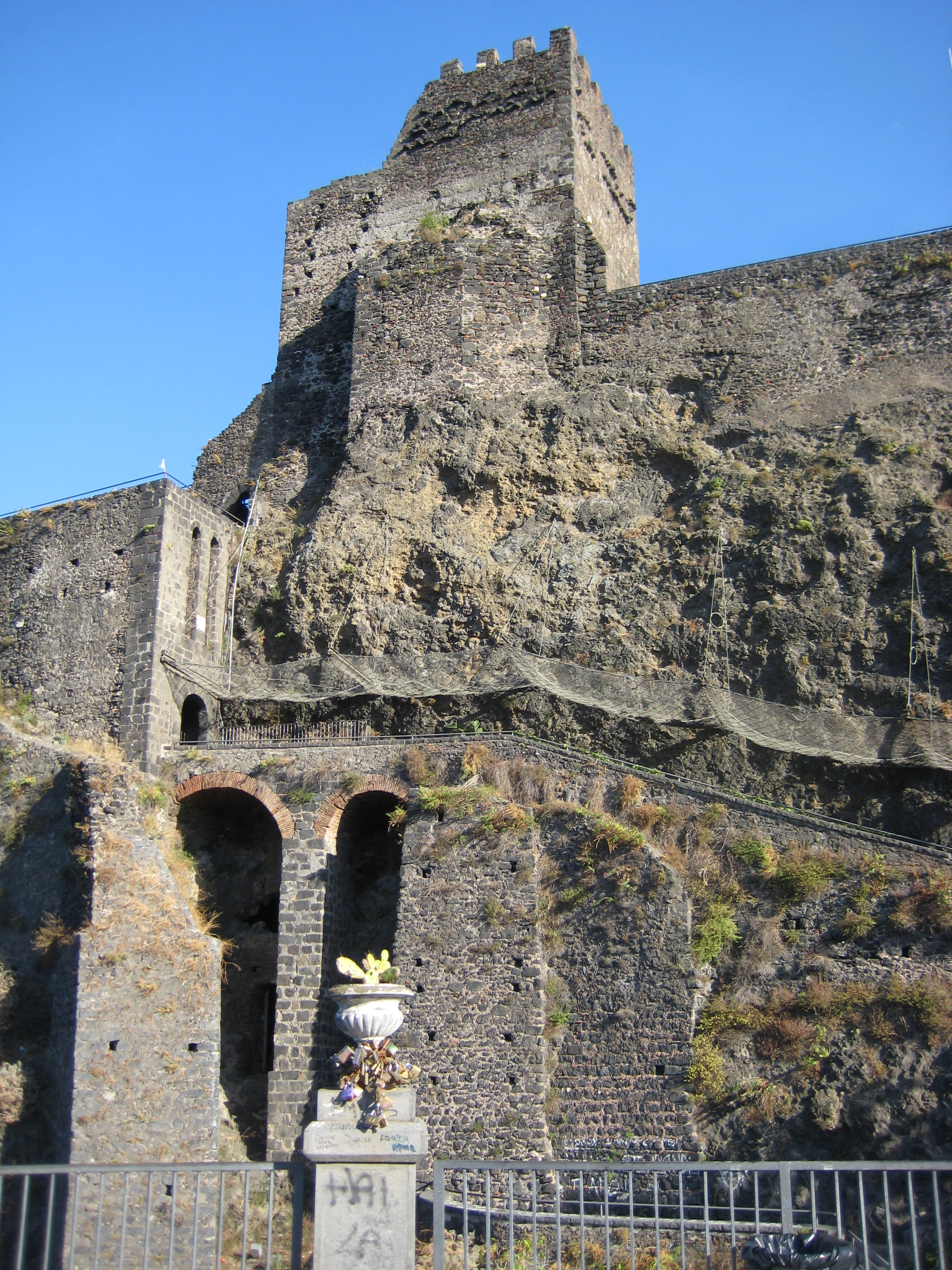
The castle of Aci, where Louis died

In June Louis rehabilitated the Ventimiglia family, old rivals of the Chiaramonte, and restored them to the office of chamberlain. In November he personally led the force that reconquered Piazza Armerina. He followed up his success with further actions in the westernmost Sicilian province, the Val di Mazara, occupying Cammarata and Trapani. During late December and early January he was in Calatafimi. Only the town of Castronovo continued to resist in the province. On 7 January 1355 Louis was in Giuliana, but he returned to Catania in February. From there he and the Alagona launched an assault against Lentini on 13 May, but the siege of the town had to be lifted in mid-June. On 10 July an epidemic of bubonic plague broke out at Catania and the king left for Messina.

From Messina Louis led a naval and land campaign against Palermo, but succeeded only in devastating the countryside. By September he was able to return to Catania. He was struck by the plague, moved to Aci, a castle belonging to the recently deceased Frederick of Randazzo. There he died on 16 October, only seventeen years of age. That same night his body was moved to the church of Santa Maria la Grande outside the walls of Catania. The next day (17 October) his funeral procession passed through the streets to the cathedral of Sant'Agata, where his body was placed in the same tomb as his grandfather, Frederick III, and uncle, John of Randazzo.

Although marriage negotiations had languished since his accession, Louis did leave two illegitimate sons, Antonio (Anthony) and Luigi (Louis), who were sent to Barcelona to be raised by their aunt Eleanor, queen of Aragon. On 10 October 1355, days before his death, Eleanor had written to Louis to reopen the negotiations for his marriage to Constance, her stepdaughter. Negotiations were apparently also underway for the hand of a daughter of Matteo II Visconti, ruler of Milan, and for the hand of the King of Naples's niece Margaret of Durazzo, ten years Louis's junior.

== Sources ==
- Abulafia, David (2000). Jones, Michael (ed.). The New Cambridge Medieval History, Volume 6: c.1300–c.1415. Cambridge: Cambridge University Press. pp. 488–514.
- Fodale, Salvatore (2007). "Ludovico (Luigi) d'Aragona, re di Sicilia (Trinacria)". Dizionario Biografico degli Italiani. Vol. 66. Rome: Istituto dell'Enciclopedia Italiana.

Regnal titles
| Preceded by Peter II | King of Sicily; 1342–1355 | Succeeded by Frederick IV |
