= Peter of Aragon (heir of Sicily) =

Heir apparent to the Sicilian throne (1398–1400)

Peter
- Born: 17 November 1398; Catania, Sicily
- Died: 8 November 1400 (aged 1 year, 356 days); Catania, Sicily
- Burial: Catania Cathedral
- House: Barcelona
- Father: Martin I of Sicily
- Mother: Maria of Sicily

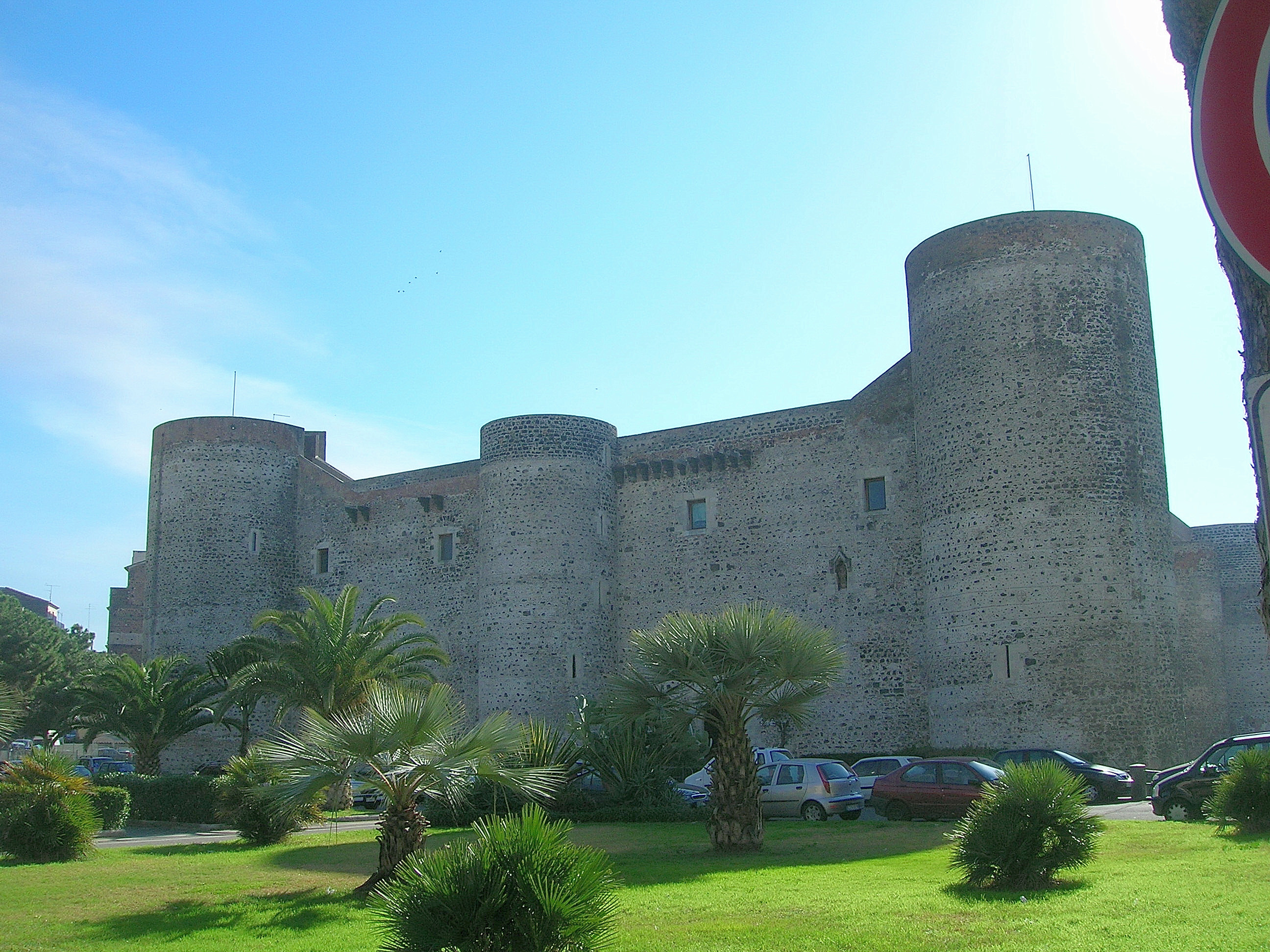
Ursino Castle

Peter (17 November 1398 – 16 August/8 November 1400) was the son and heir apparent of Queen Maria and King Martin I of Sicily. He was a member of the House of Barcelona.

== Life ==
He was the only son and heir apparent of Queen Maria and King Martin I of Sicily. He was born on 17 November 1398 at Ursino Castle in Catania. His birth was long and difficult for the mother. His birth name was Frederick according to the Sicilian traditions, but according to the Aragonese customs he was baptized as Peter on 29 April 1399 at his birthplace Ursino Castle with great ceremony. The king and queen had been childless for a long time, so the birth of a son was a great joy not only for Kingdom of Sicily but for Kingdom of Aragon too.

In Aragon he was second in line after his father. His birth solved the succession in Sicily and the continuity of the dynasty in Aragon at that time. The good news of his birth arrived in Aragon on February 1399 because his paternal grandfather, King Martin of Aragon, expressed his joy over his long-awaited grandson's birth in the letter about his forthcoming coronation to notary Vitale de Filesio, vicesecreto of Agrigento on 28 February 1399. This period was the zenith of the King of Aragon's rule when he and his wife, Maria de Luna, were crowned in Zaragoza. The House of Barcelona seemed to be in full bloom.

Shortly before his second birthday, he died in an accident on 16 August or 8 November 1400 in Catania. He was killed by a spear in the head during a tournament. His death threw his mother into deep melancholy, and she died next year in Lentini from the plague.

Peter was buried at Cathedral of St Agatha, Catania beside his grandparents, Frederick III the Simple and Constance of Aragon, where his mother, Queen Maria's mortal remains also were laid to rest next year.

== Bibliography ==
- Lo Forte Scirpo, Maria Rita: C'era una volta una regina... : due donne per un regno: Maria d'Aragona e Bianca di Navarra, Napoli, Liguori, 2003. ISBN 88-207-3527-X
- Maria d'Aragona, regina di Sicilia, Enciclopedia Italiana (Treccani), Rome, 1938–2006. URL: See External links
- Fodale, Salvatore: Blanca de Navarra y el gobierno de Sicilia, Príncipe de Viana 60, 311–322, 1999. URL: See External links
- Silleras-Fernández, Núria: Spirit and Force: Politics, Public and Private in the Reign of Maria de Luna (1396–1406), In: Theresa Earenfight (ed.): Queenship and Political Power in Medieval and Early Modern Spain, Ashgate, 78–90, 2005. ISBN 0-7546-5074-X, 9780754650744 URL: See External links
- Miron, E. L.: The Queens of Aragon: Their Lives and Times, London, Stanley Paul & Co, 1913. URL: See External links
- Tramontana, Salvatore: Il matrimonio con Martino: il progetto, i capitoli, la festa, Príncipe de Viana 60, 13–24, 1999. URL: See External links
- Aprile, Francesco: Della cronologia universale della Sicilia, Palermo, 1725. URL: See External links
- Sardina, Patrizia: Il notaio Vitale de Filesio, vicesecreto di Agrigento nell'età dei Martini (1392–1410), Mediterranea. Ricerche storiche 3, 2006, 423–442. URL: See External links
