= Louis of Naples =

Louis of Naples may refer to:

- Saint Louis of Toulouse (1274–1297), son of king Charles II of Naples
- Louis I of Naples (r. 1348–1362), also known as Louis of Taranto
- Louis I of Anjou (d. 1384), titular king (or anti-king) of Naples (coronation by Antipope Clement VII in 1382)
- Louis II of Anjou (1377–1417), king of Naples as Louis II (r. 1389–1399)
- Louis III of Anjou (d. 1434), titular king of Naples as Louis III (r. 1417–1426)

== See also ==
- List of monarchs of Naples
- List of monarchs of Sicily
- Louis of Sicily
