= Elizabeth of Carinthia =

Elizabeth of Carinthia may refer to:

- Elisabeth of Carinthia, Queen of Germany (died 1312), wife of King Albert I from 1298 until 1308, also duchess of Austria from 1282
- Elizabeth of Carinthia, Queen of Sicily (1298–1352), wife of King Peter II and regent for her son, Louis, from 1348 until 1352
