= Elizabeth of Carinthia, Queen of Sicily =

Elizabeth of Carinthia
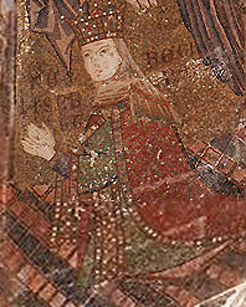

Queen consort of Sicily
- Tenure: 25 June 1337 – 15 August 1342
- Born: 1298
- Died: 1370 (aged 71–72)
- Spouse: Peter II of Sicily (m. 1323; died 1342)
- Issue: Constance, Regent of Sicily; Eleanor, Queen of Aragon; Beatrice, Countess Palatine; Euphemia, Regent of Sicily; Louis I the Child; Frederick IV the Simple; Blanche, Countess of Ampurias
- House: Gorizia
- Father: Otto III of Carinthia
- Mother: Euphemia of Silesia-Liegnitz

Elizabeth of Carinthia (1298–1352) was Queen of Sicily by marriage to Peter II of Sicily. She was the regent of Sicily during the minority of her son Louis, King of Sicily from 1348 until her death in 1352.

The daughter of Otto, the penultimate duke of Carinthia and lord of Carniola from the House of Gorizia, she married Peter II of Sicily in 1323 and became the Queen of Sicily. During her time as Queen, Elizabeth ensured that the royal lineage of the Aragonese in Sicily continued. Two sons eventually ascended the throne, Louis of Sicily and Frederick IV of Sicily. Elizabeth was the regent for her young son Louis from 1348 until her death in 1352.

Politically, the decades leading up to Elizabeth's reign were full of conflicts between Frederick III, King of Sicily, and Robert of Naples who had the backing of the papacy in Avignon. Famine, warfare and plague were widespread in Europe during the mid-fourteenth century, which had a devastating impact on Sicily in particular, due to its economic expansion and prosperity in the two centuries prior. Elizabeth's reign occurred during a period where Italian citizens were disheartened and anxious, which caused tension among the local populace. The island was also marked by turbulent relations between the throne and Sicily's noble families, eventually degenerating into a civil war. These internal rivalries between the noble families required the coming of age of Elizabeth's sons to resolve the fighting.

== Early life ==
Elizabeth of Carinthia, born in 1298, was the second daughter to Otto III of Carinthia (also known as Otto II in Tyrol), who ruled Carinthia, Tyrol and the margravates of Carniola and Savinja jointly with his younger brother Henry. Her mother was Euphemia of Silesia-Liegnitz (1274-1347), the daughter of Henry V, Duke of Legnica. Otto and Euphemia had no male heirs. Little is known about Elizabeth's early life, prior to her marriage, as is the case with many medieval women, even noble medieval women. Since her father died when she was 12, it is very likely that she spent her teens under the tutelage of her uncle Henry of Bohemia and that her marriage was arranged through his help.

Elizabeth's family, the House of Gorizia, had been staunch supporters of the Emperor in the struggle against the papacy. In the 13th century, they had been loyal allies of the Hohenstaufens against the Spanheim dukes of Carinthia who had sided with the papacy. Elizabeth's father and uncle were half-brothers of Conradin, the last Hohenstaufen scion. The connection with the Aragonese rulers in Sicily was thus natural, even though they were too far apart to have a tangible common interest at the time of Elizabeth's betrothal. Perhaps, the marriage was aimed to check the rising Angevin influence in Central Europe after Charles I's ascension to the Hungarian throne, especially since the Anjou allies in Croatia were in conflict with the Carinthian dukes.

== Queenship ==
On 23 April 1323, Elizabeth married Peter II of Sicily (Trinacria), son of Frederick III, King of Sicily (Trinacria) (1271–25 June 1337) and Eleanor of Anjou (1289–9 August 1341) a little more than a year after his coronation. Speculation by Francesco Testa suggests that Elizabeth was not Frederick III's first choice for a daughter-in-law. Frederick wished to marry his heir to Beatrice, the daughter of the Holy Roman Emperor, Henry. Instead, Beatrice married Charles of Hungary, a nephew of king Robert of Naples, Frederick's main enemy. In turn, Frederick married his eldest son and heir to Elizabeth of Carinthia, whose family was in fierce rivalry to Beatrice's (John of Luxembourg, Beatrice's brother, had taken the Bohemian crown from Elizabeth's uncle and caretaker Henry). The lavish ceremonies of the wedding and coronation served as reminders to Sicilian nobility of the power of the royalty, a struggle the Aragonese family had been battling for years. Elizabeth's reign as regent would be marked by the tensions created over these struggles.

As the queen, Elizabeth's primary occupation was the production of viable heirs for the Sicilian throne, as task she took up soon after marriage. Less than two years after their wedding, Peter II and Elizabeth had a son in Messina in February 1324, whom they named Frederick and buried a few months later. Following the death of their first born, Elizabeth and Peter II had seven more children, their first four daughters whom survived to maturity were; Constance (1324–October 1355), regent of Sicily for her younger brother, Louis, from 1352 to 1354 following the death of her mother, Elizabeth. Constance never married. Their second daughter, Eleanor (1325–1375), married Peter IV of Aragon, and was the mother of John I of Aragon and Martin the Humane. Beatrice (1326–1365) their third daughter, married Rupert II, Elector Palatine, and they had Rupert of Germany. Their fourth surviving child, Euphemia (1330–1359), was regent for her brother Frederick IV of Sicily from 1355 to 1357. Like her sister Constance, Euphemia never married.

Following their four daughters, Elizabeth gave birth to Louis on 4 February 1338. Louis became the heir to Peter II, his father. After successfully producing a male heir, Elizabeth and Peter II had Frederick, later Frederick IV of Sicily and his brother Louis's successor. Peter II and Elizabeth had three more children together; Violante, who was born in 1334, died young, John (1342–22 June 1353) and Blanche (1342–1373), who married John, Count of Ampurias. Of their ten children, five daughters and two sons survived into adulthood.

The death of Frederick III in 1337 sparked the explosion of Sicilian tensions, created from the confluence of strain of political uncertainty, a bad economy and unstable power imbalance between the divided feudal class. The death of her father-in-law began the solo reign of Peter II as King of Sicily. King Frederick's reign, which ended in 1337 with the succession of his son Peter, was a tale of two types. The early years were an attempt at reconstruction from the fighting with Naples that ended in 1302. Frederick wanted to integrate the people of Sicily and unite them into a true Kingdom of Sicily. He attempted to do this by drawing on the people's hate of the Angevins and was largely successful. During this reconstruction process, the Sicilians saw improvement in their fortunes, both culturally and commercially, until around 1312. As invasions by the Angevins increased during the 1310s, Sicily was ravaged. Siding with the Ghibellines resulted in a loss of Guelph trading partners in northern Italy. It appears that most Sicilians were ambivalent to the Guelph/Ghibelline conflict, which made Frederick's decision seem unreasonable. Various food crises also occurred between 1311 and 1335. After 1321, the economy was in ruins. Constant port blockades by Robert of Naples hurt Sicily further, and by 1325 its economy was destroyed. Frederick's government became increasingly hated and powerless. The economic burden of constantly being at war had taken its toll on the population. The king had also dispensed the majority of his personal wealth to churches and hospitals, so there was nothing left to give barons or ecclesiastical leaders. If all of this was not bad enough, eruptions of Mount Etna in 1329 and 1333 signaled to Sicilians that God was punishing them for Frederick's sins. Once the decline started, it just got worse and worse. When Frederick died in 1337, civil war broke out in Sicily, with the barons feuding for control of the island. Peter II and Elizabeth were left with a kingdom that went from a high point in the early part of Frederick's reign, to a low point at his death when Sicily was in shambles. The decisions made by Frederick may have protected Sicily from the Angevins, but it came at a cost that would be a common theme when Elizabeth became queen.

As it was easy to influence Peter II, Sicily would have been much more negatively impacted by his reign if it were not for Elizabeth. In the struggles between the feuding groups, Elizabeth sided with the Palizzi, who won the favour of the king over Chiaramonte. Further from their home in Messina, the Aragonese interest warred the Angevins warred in Greece. With her mother-in-law, Eleanora of Naples, Elizabeth worked to support mediation and reconciliation between the two feuding houses. Although very limited in actual power, Elizabeth used her influences to impact the governance of Sicily.

With the death of her husband Peter II in August 1342, Elizabeth lost the influence over the political management of the Kingdom of Sicily. At Elizabeth's insistence, Louis, her four-year-old son, was crowned King of Sicily, ensuring his rightful place on the throne. Peter II's brother, Duke John, acted as regent for the first six years of the young king's reign. During this time, Elizabeth kept a power balance with her brother-in-law. When Duke John died of plague in 1348, Elizabeth became the regent for ten-year-old Louis. Elizabeth's regency lasted from 1348, until her death. Her daughter Constance took over as regent for Louis.

It is unclear when exactly Elizabeth died. Some sources suggest that she died between 1349 and 1350, while others date it later to 1352. She is buried in Messina in St. Francis. Her last son, King Frederick IV (d. 1377), is buried next to her.

Although little information remains on Elizabeth of Carinthia, Queen of Sicily, what little is known makes it clear that she worked to positively impact the decisions of those around her. Her influence over her husband Peter II ensured that the Kingdom of Sicily remain intact. Later, her delicate negotiations with Duke John, her brother-in-law and regent of Louis, helped to maintain the Kingdom of Sicily. Elizabeth's agency ensured that her children did inherit the Sicilian throne. Elizabeth's action exhibits how queens were able to exert influence, not just as wives, but as mothers of the future generation.

== Regency ==
The period of Elizabeth's regency was marked by a continuing growth in feudalism and a consequent loss of royal control of areas of the island of Sicily. This had begun with Frederick III. He succeeded in the agglomeration of so-called "lands" along the coasts in domains such as Trapani, Marsala, Sciacca, Licata, Terranova, Lentini, Taormina, Milazzo and Termini, and also in the hinterland in domains such as Nicosia, Randazzo, Troina and Castrogiovanni, Caltagirone, Noto, Corleone and Biovna, Polizza and Monte San Giuliano. Yet despite this consolidation of control, Sicily overall experienced an increase of domains under feudal control, either through the creation or the restoration of numerous baronies, such as the domains of Geraci, Mineo, Modica, Adernò, Aidone, Collesano and Augusta. During her regency, Alcamo notably passed to the control of the military aristocracy, in 1349, and other barons enclosed within their walls fiefdoms such as Buscemi, Pettineo and Luppino, along with constructing numerous fortresses. All of Sicily eventually came into contact with the military power of the aristocracy through the duties of military service and the carrying out of justice possessed by the nobility. This influence of local power was, beyond the simple creation or re-establishment of baronies, another way in which the aristocracy gained power and threatened the authority of the Sicilian throne. The two sides of the struggle to come between the baronies and the throne had thus been outlined before the beginning of Elizabeth's regency and continued along the same course during it, eventually flaring up into civil war.

In this atmosphere of increasing feudalisation, the goal of the Sicilian throne to maintain the dynasty from the House of Barcelona after the death of Frederick III in 1337 was soon to deteriorate. Elizabeth's coat of arms was shared by the competing baronial factions, yet several powerful and power-hungry figures emerged to challenge royal power, serving as the heads of competing family lines. These included the families of the Chiaramonte, the Palizzi, the Scaloro degli Uberti, the Peralta, the Alagona and the Ventimiglia. As historian Henri Bresc describes, several dynastic "war cries" were heard from these families around Sicily in the years of Elizabeth's regency and beyond, in places such as Palermo in 1348, Fontanarossa in 1349, Noto in 1349, Vizzini in 1353, Polizzi in 1354, and Naso in 1356. Yet the causes of this threat to the throne's rule did not arise, in these families of the Sicilian aristocracy, from factors such as inter-familial agreements and solidarity, but personal ambition and the goal of maintaining it for a family's posterity, through the bestowing of rule to their children. As a result, betrayals in this brew of competing families were common, and any agreement or coalition between them had ill-defined borders, easily liable to be crossed breached. When Elizabeth's husband, Peter II of Sicily took to the throne after the death of Frederick III of Sicily in 1337, the Palizzi were expelled from Sicily. His reign lasted for merely five years, as Peter II died in 1342. Thereupon Elizabeth and Peter's son Louis, King of Sicily (Ludovico or Luigi in Italian) took to the throne, Louis being only a child of five years of age. He was to be the object of the competing intrigues of Sicily's baronial families.

Now a civil war between Sicily's aristocratic families took shape and they each formed battle camps under their respective familial flags. Although there was a large factor of personal ambition at play, as already stated, the parties' principal objective was the domination and control of the crown of Sicily. To this end, each family vied for a friendly ear of the queen-regent Elizabeth. The two groups of families in this war have come to be known respectively as the local "Latin" faction, the Chiaramonte, the Palizzi and the Scaloro degli Uberti, with whom Elizabeth sided, and the "Catalans", whose members included the families of foreign origin, the Peralta, the Alagona and the Ventimigilia. The "Catalans" found favour with Elizabeth's brother in law, the nobleman John, Duke of Randazzo (also known as the Infant John), until John made the bold and unexpected decision to seek reconciliation with his brother Peter II, who had been so far on the side of the "Latins", and who had feared the ambition of his nobleman brother. As a result, the Palizzi were exiled from the island and the "Catalans" thus gained the upper hand thanks to their favor with the Sicilian throne. This division among the descendants of King Frederic III of Sicily had thus even split up Elizabeth's family for a time, as Elizabeth remained favorable to the Palizzi faction, yet royal control remained with Duke John through his co-regency in the name of his nephew Louis II, still a minor, and therefore the Catalans remained with the upper hand. The opposing "Latin" faction encountered a reversal of their negative fortunes when John succumbed, presumably, to the plague and died in 1348, leaving Elizabeth as the sole regent in the name of her son Louis. Thereupon the "Latin" party allied to the Queen Mother seized control of the Sicilian state and recalled the exiled Palizzi.

=== Economic and sociopolitical concerns ===
Sicily experienced one of the most significant population collapses in Europe in the fourteenth century, falling from approximately 850,000 in 1277 to approximately 350,000 in 1376. The population was therefore at an unusually low point at the time of Elizabeth's reign. The most significant contributor to this was the bubonic plague, which ravaged Sicily in the second half of the century. Although the lower population due to the bubonic plague undoubtedly benefited the lower class in the long term, its immediate effects were widespread attitudes of defeatism and uneasiness.

The Black Death reached Sicily in 1347, before it affected mainland Italy. This was during Elizabeth's reign, and was likely one of her prime concerns throughout the remainder of her time in power. Outbreaks of the Black Death had occurred in Italy before in the thirteenth century, but they were generally localized and confined to one or two towns. 1347 was the first severe case recorded in Sicily, and initiated the pandemic that became a familiar aspect of European life for centuries. Elizabeth could do nothing to relieve the people, although she refrained from fleeing the country which was a common trend among those Italians who could afford to. Gabriel de Mussis, an Italian notary in the fourteenth century, recounts an attitude of despondency in Sicily; occurrences such as heavy rainfalls, the birth of Siamese twins, and horses refusing to enter Messina were all considered signs that God had abandoned the people. The plague had drastic economic effects on Italy as well, and contributed to the first significant economic crisis in centuries.

Sicily's economy in the fourteenth century was turbulent, and marked a drastic departure from its success in the twelfth and thirteenth centuries. Fiscal revenue in Sicily was concernedly low during Elizabeth's reign, primarily relating to Europe's declining population. Domestically, the low population meant lower revenue from domestic taxation. The lower population abroad and in mainland Italy meant that there was a lower demand for Sicilian exports, namely grain. In addition, feudal revenues began to decline significantly in approximately 1330; total feudal revenue dropped from 20691 onze in 1336, to 14405 onze in 1343. It is probable that the aristocracy pressured Elizabeth and the monarchy to reduce feudal military duties, a pressure which increased after the death of Frederick III in 1337. This pressure likely had numerous contributing factors; Elizabeth's reign was also characterized by famine, with particularly low-yielding harvests in 1345 and 1346. Increased military expenditure combined with the negative economic effects of the famine which provoked widespread debt among the aristocracy. The unstable equilibrium between the nobility and the throne characterized both Elizabeth's and her husband's reign, and resulted in a significant reduction in monarchical power. Economic historian Stephan Epstein refers to mid-to-late-fourteenth-century Sicily as a period of aristocratic hegemony.

The nobility of this period were highly antagonistic towards each other, and caused problems for Elizabeth and the monarchy. Sicilian magnate families waged a civil war with one another between the 1330s and 1360s. The collective disquiet due to the declining aristocratic incomes culminated in a social and political conflict between them and the throne. Since the nobility controlled the majority of the military force in the kingdom, their rebellion had severe implications towards the throne. From the 1330s until the 1370s, the aristocracy took increasing control of demesne land and towns. The throne's attempts to reduce the power of the nobility was unsuccessful despite Elizabeth's efforts. She proposed a peaceful partition of the country among the most powerful magnate houses in 1350, but it failed after six months. A second attempt was made in 1352, but it too failed after only a year. No final settlement dividing Sicily's administration was reached until the 1360s, after Elizabeth's death. The conclusion was a division of power based on military supremacy between a few feudal states, with the throne retaining little practical influence.

There is little evidence of organized, premeditated peasant revolt in Sicily during the period of Elizabeth's reign, though small-scale insurrections did occur. During Peter II's reign in 1337 there was an uprising against the Count of Geraci, and another in 1350 against Scaloro degli Ubertini. Both of these men were individual nobles who claimed feudal jurisdiction, and in fact it is speculated by historian John Larner that the revolts were brought about by royal incitement. This is possible considering the tension between the royalty and the aristocracy during this period. Elizabeth of Carinthia's brief rule occurred during a period of social change and economic crisis. It was characterized by conflict between the throne and the aristocracy, and the socioeconomic, ideological and behavioural changes brought about by the devastating effects of the Black Death.

== Death and legacy ==
Upon this success of the "Latin" faction, many urban Sicilian populations manifested what Henri Bresc has described as an "Anti-Catalan" Vespers, reminiscent of the famous Sicilian Vespers of several decades past. After the recalling of the Palizzi family, it was common, especially around Palermo, to hear calls for the expulsion of the noble families in the "Catalan" faction, "from their castles, their offices, their dignities and their honours", or chants of "May they leave the Kingdom!". This sentiment was not new, as early as 1342, this popular anti-Catalan feeling found expression in chanting "Viva lu Re et lu Populu" in Messina (Long Live the King and the People: "Long live the King and the People" in the Medieval Sicilian). The success of Elizabeth's chosen faction therefore appeared secure, despite all the challenges presented in internal and foreign intrigues, when Elizabeth died, possibly to the plague, as late as 1370. For a time after her death, there existed a notable unity between the families of the "Latin" faction, yet all this unity was overturned when Louis himself died from the plague in 1355 at the young age of 17, and the pro-Catalan Frederick IV came to the throne, along with the Neapolitan invasion to restore Angevin influence on the island in 1354.

== Ancestry ==
Ancestors of Elizabeth of Carinthia, Queen of Sicily

16. Engelbert III, Count of Gorizia
8. Meinhard I of Gorizia-Tyrol
17. Matilda of Andechs
4. Meinhard of Carinthia
18. Albert IV, Count of Tyrol
9. Adeleide, Countess of Tyrol
19. Uta of Frontenhausen-Lechsgemünd
2. Otto III of Carinthia
20. Louis I, Duke of Bavaria
10. Otto II, Duke of Bavaria
21. Ludmilla of Bohemia
5. Elizabeth of Bavaria
22. Henry V, Count Palatine of the Rhine
11. Agnes of the Palatinate
23. Agnes of Hohenstaufen
1. Elizabeth of Carinthia
24. Henry II the Pious
12. Bolesław the Bald
25. Anne of Bohemia
6. Henry V of Legnica
26. Henry I, Count of Anhalt
13. Hedwig of Anhalt
27. Irmgard of Thuringia
3. Euphemia of Legnica
28. Władysław Odonic
14. Bolesław the Pious
29. Jadwiga of Greater Poland
7. Elisabeth of Kalisz
30. Béla IV of Hungary
15. Yolanda of Poland
31. Maria Laskarina

== Notes ==
=== References ===
- Abulafia, David (2000). "The Italian South". In Michael Jones (ed.). c. 1300 – c. 1415. The New Cambridge Medieval History. Vol. 6. Cambridge: Cambridge University Press. pp. 488–514. doi:10.1017/CHOL9780521362900.023. ISBN 978-0-521-36290-0.
- Backman, Clifford R. (1995). The Decline and Fall of Medieval Sicily: Politics, Religion, and Economy in the Reign of Frederick III, 1296–1337. Cambridge: Cambridge University Press.
- Bisson, Thomas N. (1986). Medieval Crown of Aragon: a Short History. Oxford: Clarendon Press.
- Bresc, Henri (1986). Un Monde Méditerranéen: Économie et Société en Sicile, 1300–1450. Rome: École Française de Rome.
- Davies, Stephen (1998). Marriage and the Politics of Friendship: the Family of Charles II of Anjou, King of Naples (1285–1309) (PhD thesis). University College London.
- Epstein, Stephan R. (1992). An Island for Itself: economic development and social change in late medieval Sicily. Cambridge University Press.
- Housley, Norman (1982). The Italian Crusades: the Papal–Angevin Alliance and the Crusades against Christian Lay Powers, 1254–1343. Oxford: Clarendon Press.
- Housley, Norman (1986). The Avignon Papacy and the Crusades, 1305–1378. Oxford: Clarendon Press.
- Kelly, Samantha (2003). The New Soloman: Robert of Naples (1309–1343) and Fourteenth-century Kingship. Boston: Brill.
- Kos, Milko (1985). Srednjeveška družbena, kulturna in politična zgodovina Slovencev: zbrane razprave. Ljubljana: Slovenska matica.
- Kos, Milko (1933). Zgodovina Slovencev: od naselitve do reformacije. Ljubljana: Jugoslovanska knjigarna.
- Killinger, Charles L. (2002). History of Italy. Greenwood Press. ISBN 9780313314834.
- Larner, John (1980). Italy in the Age of Dante and Petrarch 1216–1380. MA: Addison-Wesley Longman.
- Martin, Sean (2009). The Black Death. NJ: Chartwell Books.
- Rugolo, Carmela Maria (1993). Elisabetta di Carinzia, regina di Sicilia. Vol. 42.
- Testa, Francesco (1775). De vita et rebus gestis Federici II Siciliae regis. Palermo: Cajetanus M. Bentivenga.
- Tramontana, Salvatore (1963). Michele da Piazza e il potere baronale in Sicilia. Messina.

Elizabeth of Carinthia, Queen of Sicily Meinhardiner Born: 1298 Died: 1352
Royal titles
Preceded by Eleanor of Anjou	Queen consort of Sicily; 25 June 1337 – 15 August 1342	Succeeded by Constance of Aragon
