= Constance of Aragon =

Constance of Aragon may refer to:

- Constance of Aragon, Holy Roman Empress (1179–1222), daughter of Alfonso II of Aragon, married Emeric of Hungary and then, secondly, Frederick II, Holy Roman Emperor
- Constance of Aragon, Lady of Villena (1239–1269), daughter of James I of Aragon, married Manuel, Lord of Villena
- Constance II of Sicily (1249–1302), Queen of Aragon as wife of Peter III of Aragon
- Constance of Aragon, Princess of Villena (1300–1327), daughter of James I of Aragon, married Juan Manuel, Prince of Villena
- Constance, Queen of Cyprus and Armenia (1305–1344), infanta of Aragon, daughter of Frederick III of Sicily
- Constance of Aragon, Queen of Majorca (1318–1346), daughter of Alfonso IV of Aragon, married James III of Majorca
- Constance of Aragon, Queen of Sicily (1343–1363), daughter of Peter IV of Aragon, married Frederick III the Simple

== See also ==
- Constance of Sicily (disambiguation)
