= Frederick of Sicily =

Frederick of Sicily may refer to:

- Frederick II, Holy Roman Emperor (1194-1250), also known as Frederick I of Sicily
- Frederick III of Sicily (1272–1337), self-styled the third despite being the second Frederick to rule Sicily (Trinacria)
- Frederick the Simple (1341–1377), third Frederick to rule Sicily (Trinacria)
- Frederick IV of Naples (1452–1504), continued Neapolitan claim to Kingdom of Sicily
