= Frederick of Randazzo =

Duke of Athens

Frederick I
- count of Malta
- Coat of arms of Aragonese Sicily

Duke of Athens & Neopatria
- Reign: 1348–1355
- Predecessor: John, Duke of Randazzo
- Successor: Frederick III of Sicily
- Died: 11 July 1355
- Buried: Sant' Agatha in Palermo
- Noble family: of Barcelona
- Father: John, Duke of Randazzo
- Mother: Cesarea of Castalnasetta

Frederick I (died 11 July 1355) was the Duke of Athens and Neopatria from 1348 to his death, also the Count of Malta. He succeeded his father John, Duke of Randazzo, in Greece after his father died of the Black Plague, but he too died of the same plague seven years later.

Frederick was an absentee lord throughout his reign, although his regent Blasco II of Alagona, urged him to visit his duchy in 1349. Frederick appointed Ramón Bernardi as his vicar general there, but the latter was opposed by the baronage, who requested his removal from power just before the duke died. Frederick died young and was buried in Sant'Agata in Palermo.

| Preceded by John of Randazzo | Duke of Athens and of Neopatria; 1348–1355 | Succeeded by Frederick II |
