= Eleanor of Aragon (1346–1405) =

- Infanta of Aragon
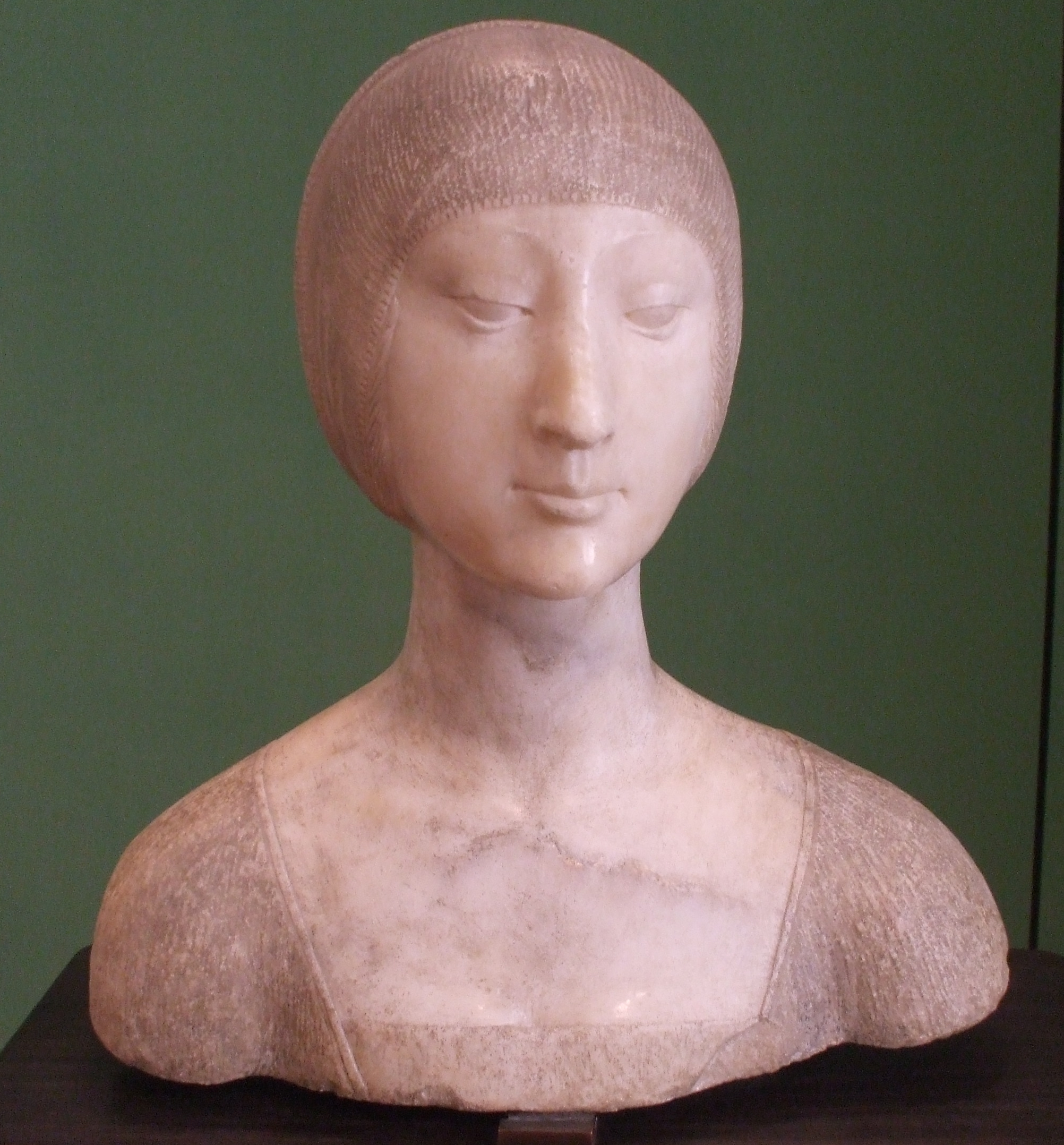

Countess consort of Caltabellotta
- Born: 1346
- Died: 1405; Giuliana, Sicily
- Spouse: Guglielmo Peralta
- Issue: Nicholas Peralta
- House: Barcelona
- Father: John, Duke of Randazzo
- Mother: Cesarea Lancia

Eleanor of Aragon (1346–1405) was a countess of Caltabellotta (Sicilian: Cataviddotta), a comune (municipality) in the Province of Agrigento in the Italian region Sicily, located about 60 kilometres (37 mi) south of Palermo and about 45 kilometres (28 mi) northwest of Agrigento.

== Life ==
She was the daughter of infante John, fourth son of Frederick III of Aragon and Eleanor of Anjou. Eleanor of Aragon's mother Cesarea Lancia was eldest daughter of Peter, Count of Caltanissetta. She died in Giuliana, Sicily and the bust from her funerary monument is now in the Galleria regionale di Palazzo Abatellis in Palermo.

== Sources ==
- "Una tomba svelerà il mistero di Eleonora d' Aragona". la Repubblica (in Italian). 20 November 2004.
