= Pierreale =

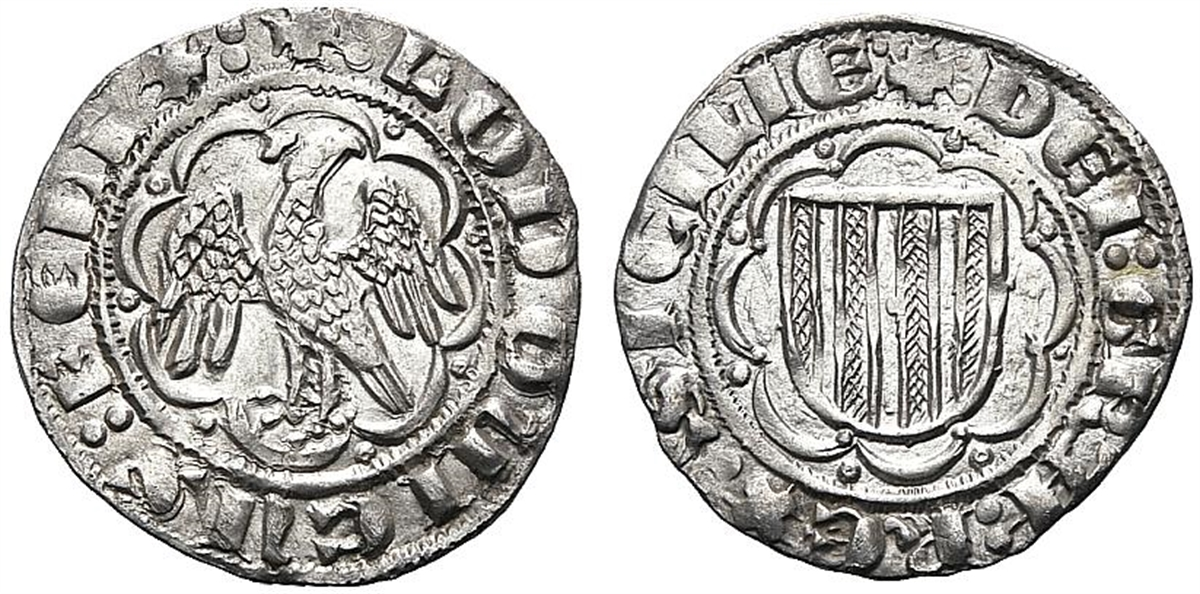
Pierreale of Louis (1342–1355)

The pierreale (plural pierreali, i.e. "reale of Peter") was a silver coin minted by the Kingdom of Trinacria (Sicily) between the reigns of Peter I (1282–1285) and Ferdinand II (1479–1516). It was equivalent in weight and fineness to the Neapolitan carlino and was sometimes called a carlino. It carried on the obverse the imperial eagle, the favoured emblem of the Staufer dynasty of Peter I's queen, Constance II, and on the reverse the arms of Aragon, representing Peter's native kingdom. The design deliberately contrasted with that of the carlino. After Alfonso I's conquest of Naples in 1442, he replaced the arms with an image of the seated ruler (in imitation of the carlino) and replaced the eagle with the quartered arms of Aragon and Naples.

Gold pierreali equivalent to ten silver ones were minted under Peter I, but only rarely thereafter. Half-pierreali and quarter-pierreali were minted between 1377 and 1410 and again during the reign of John (1458–1479).

== Gallery ==
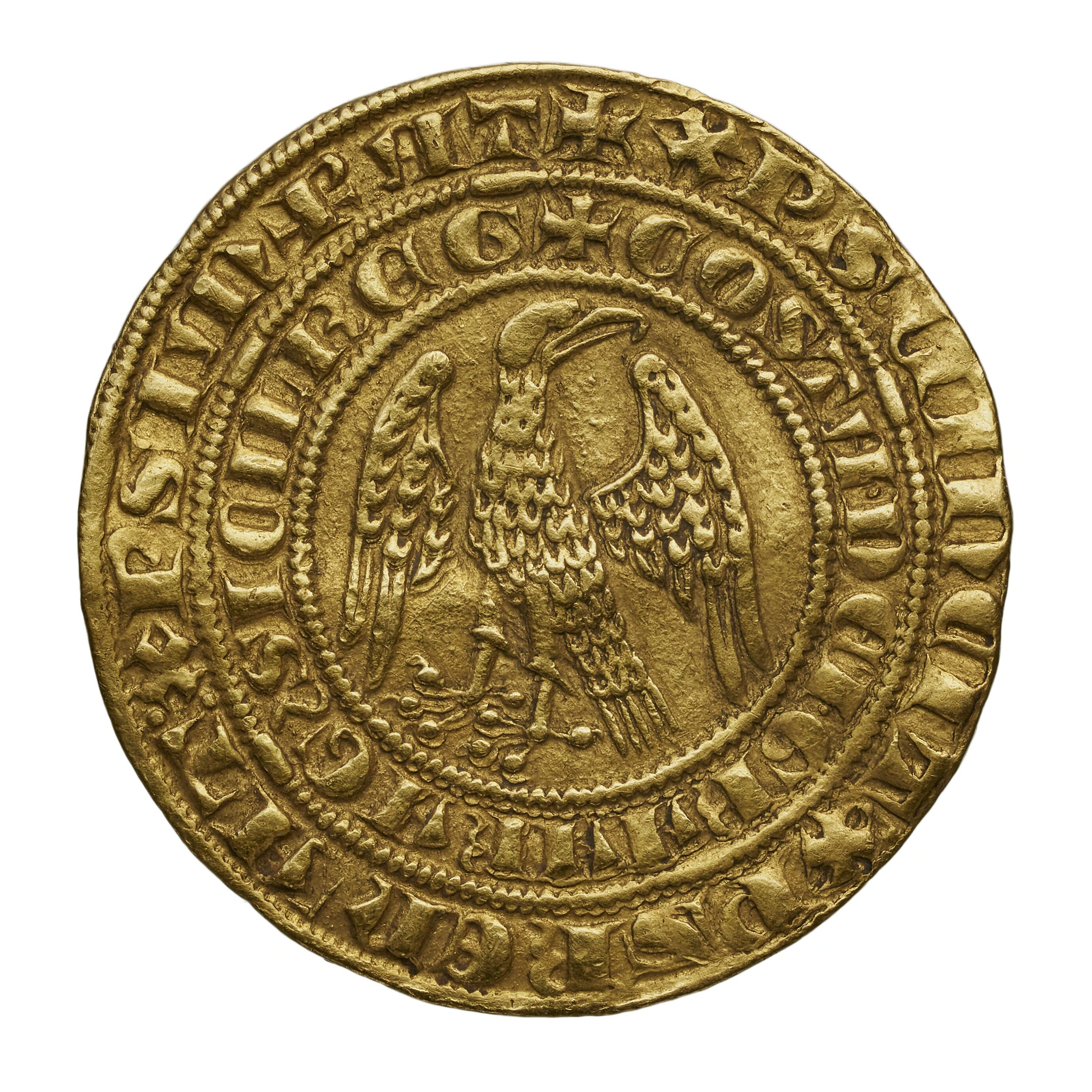
Gold pierreale of Peter I (obverse)

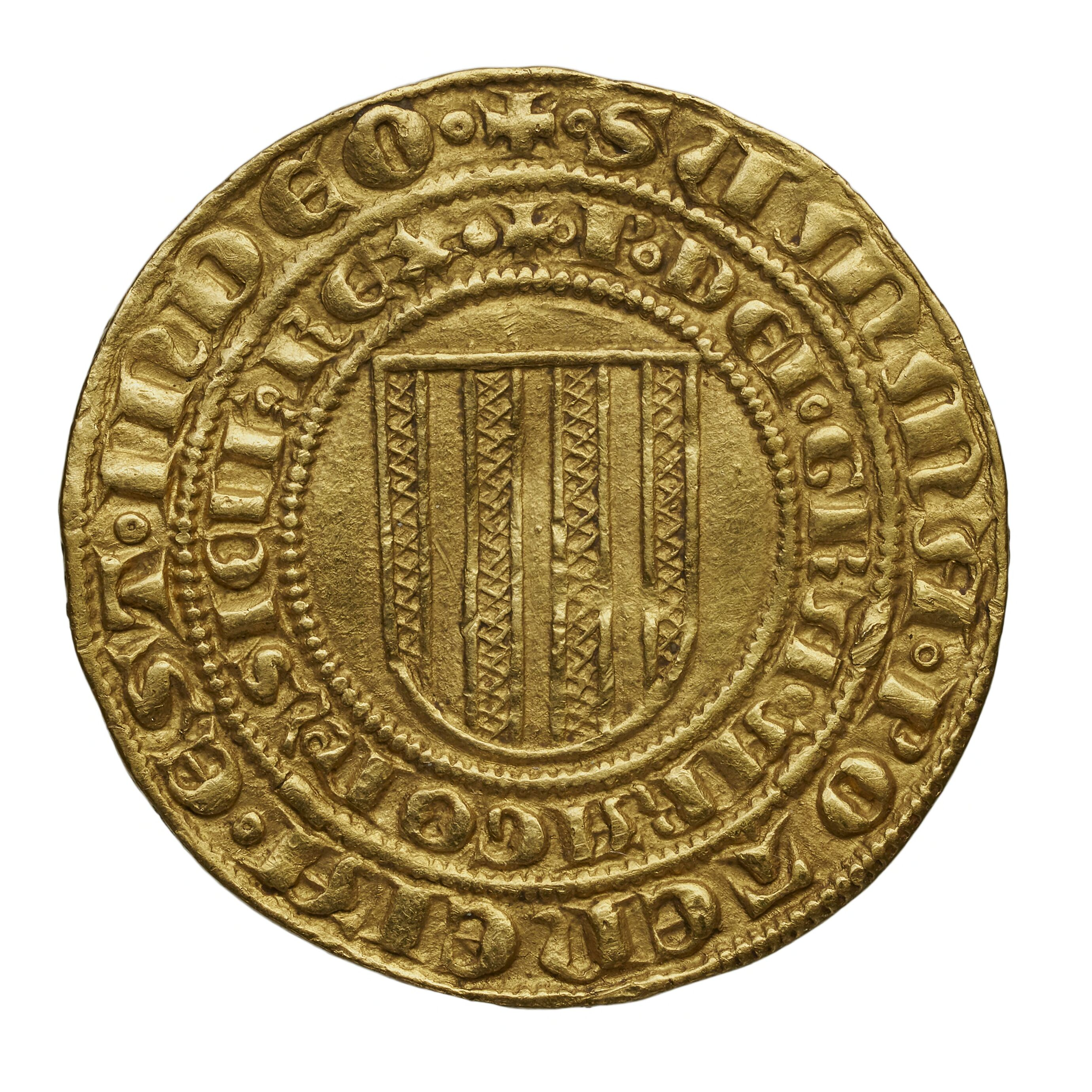
Gold pierreale of Peter I (reverse)

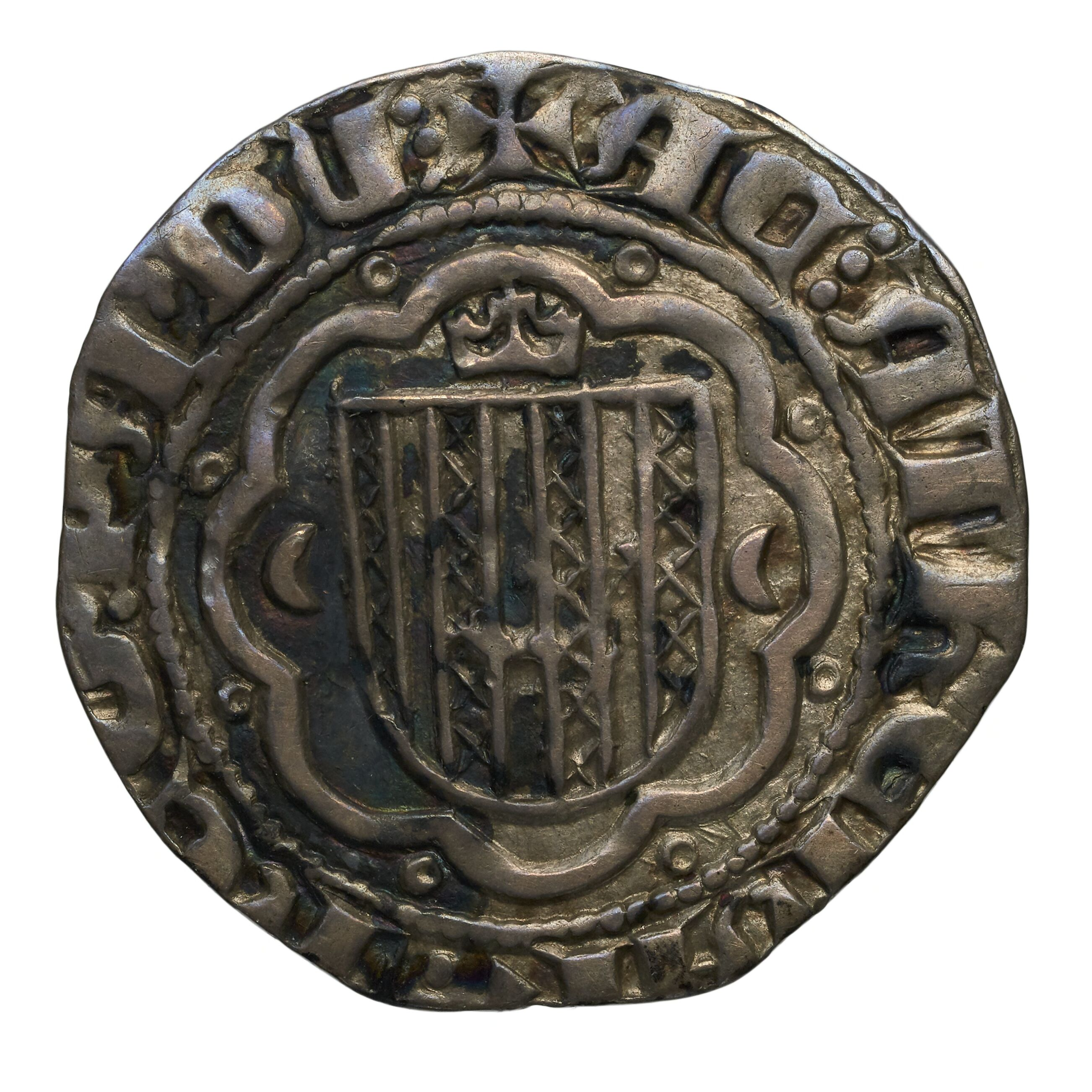
Half-pierreale of Martin I (1402–1409)

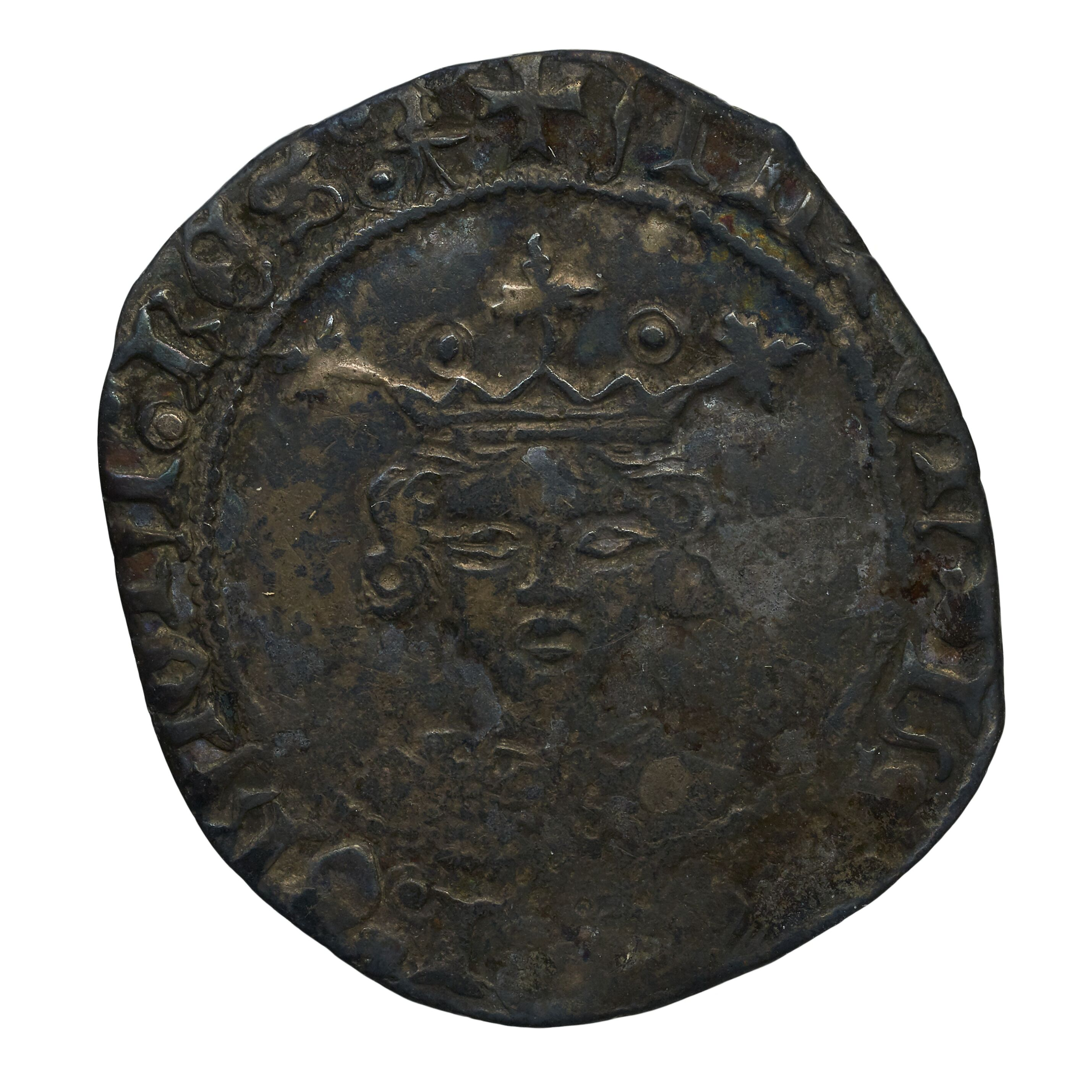
King's face on a pierreale of Alfonso I

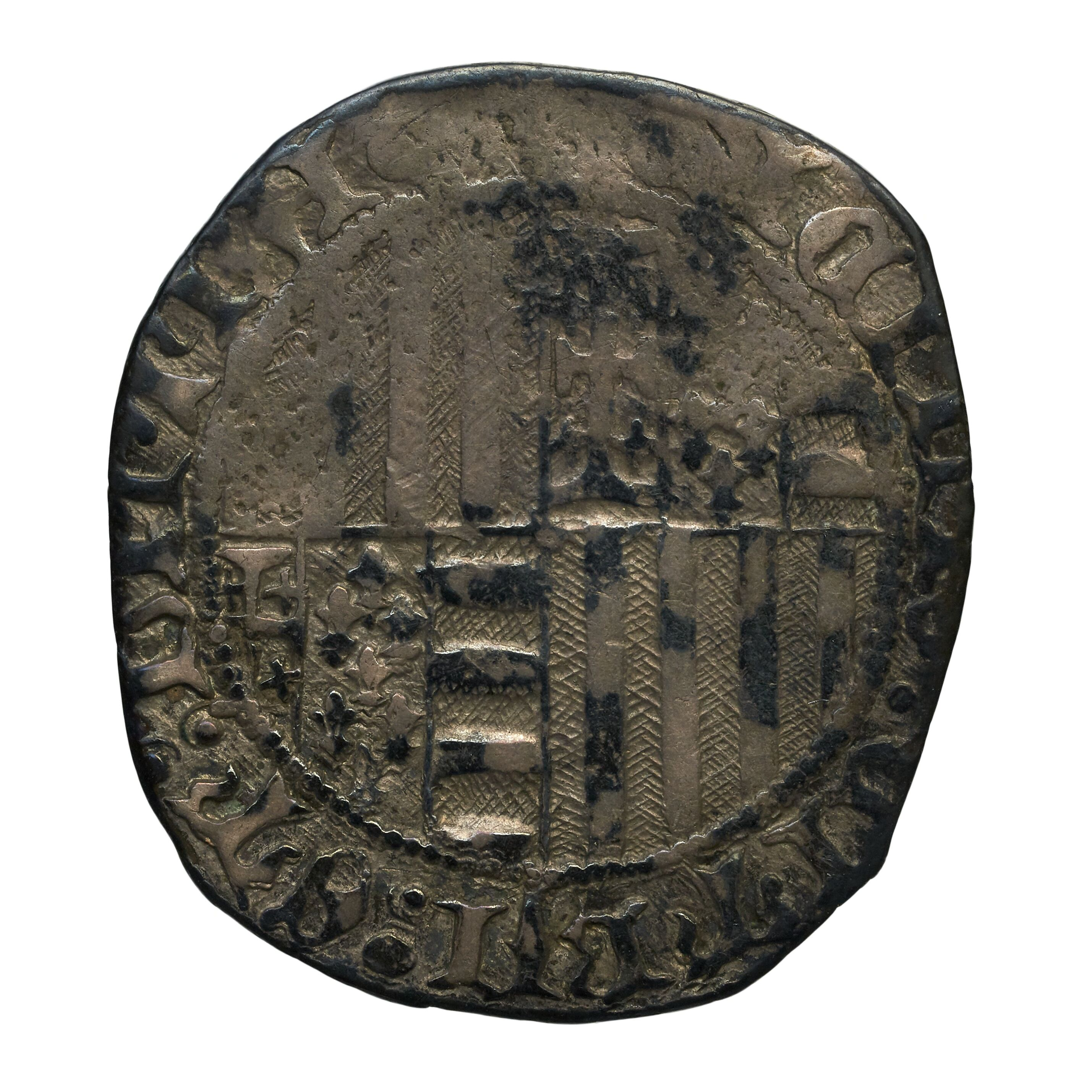
Quartered arms on a pierreale of Alfonso I

== See also ==
- History of coins in Italy
