= Eleanor of Sicily =

Queen of Aragon from 1325 to 1375

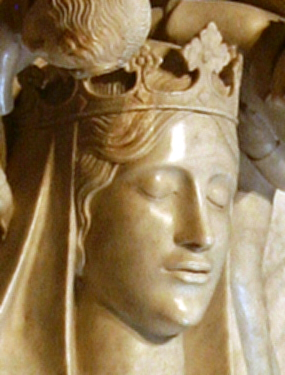
- Tomb of Peter IV of Aragon and Eleanor of Sicily (detail)

Queen consort of Aragon
- Tenure: 27 August 1349 – 20 April 1375
- Born: 1325; Sicily
- Died: 1375 (aged 49–50); Lleida, Principality of Catalonia
- Burial: Monastery of Poblet
- Spouse: Peter IV of Aragon (m. 1349)
- Issue: John I, King of Aragon; Martin, King of Aragon; Eleanor, Queen of Castile; Alfonso
- House: Barcelona
- Father: Peter II of Sicily
- Mother: Elisabeth of Carinthia

Eleanor of Sicily (in Italian, Eleonora; in Spanish, Leonor; 1325–1375) was Queen of Aragon from 1349 until 1375 as the third wife of King Peter IV.

== Early life ==
Eleanor was the daughter of Peter II of Sicily and Elisabeth of Carinthia. She was the second of eight children, six of whom survived to adulthood.

== Queen of Aragon ==
Coat of arms of Queen Eleanor

Eleanor married in Valencia on 27 August 1349 to Peter IV of Aragon, (Note: Kagay states she was married in August, no date given.) on the condition that she renounce all rights to any Sicilian Crown. He was twice-widowed, had two surviving daughters: Constance and Joanna but no surviving sons.

Eleanor became a powerful influence at the Aragonese court, replacing Bernardo de Cabrera as Peter's chief adviser.

Eleanor's brother Frederick III the Simple, married Constance of Aragon (Eleanor's stepdaughter). Frederick and Constance had a daughter, Maria, but no sons. Then in 1357 Frederick proposed to transfer the duchies of Athens and Neopatria to Eleanor in return for military help from her husband in Sicily, but was refused.

In 1373 Eleanor's eldest son John married Martha of Armagnac, a calm and conciliatory woman. Eleanor treated Martha as her own daughter.

By 1374, Eleanor founded and patronized the Poor Clares convent at Teruel. It was furnished with an annual income and a 20,000 sous construction donation. The convent employed 15 to 20 nuns to pray for the souls of her parents.

Upon a stay at her home in Empordà, Eleanor made Sibila of Fortia her lady-in-waiting; she eventually married Eleanor's widower.

== Death ==
In Lleida on 20 April 1375, Eleanor died leaving her husband a widower and her three surviving children. Her husband remarried to Sibila, a girl that was over thirty years his junior. Most of the family, including Eleanor's children, came into conflict with Sibila.

== Issue ==
Eleanor and Peter had:

- John I of Aragon (1350–1396), succeeded his father and was father himself of Yolande of Aragon, however he had no male issue so the throne passed to his younger brother
- Martin I of Aragon (1356–1410), succeeded John but had no surviving issue
- Eleanor (1358–1382), who married John I of Castile and was the mother of Ferdinand I of Aragon.
- Alfonso (1362–1364), died young

== Sources ==
- Hulme, Edward Maslin (1915). The Renaissance, The Protestant Revolution and the Catholic Reformation in Continental Europe. The Century Co.
- Jaspert, Nikolas (2019). "Testaments, Burials and Bequests. Tracing the 'Franciscanism' of Aragonese Queens and Princesses". In Jaspert, Nikolas; Just, Imke (eds.). Queens, Princesses and Mendicants: Close Relations in a European Perspective. LIT Verlag.
- Kagay, Donald J. (2021). Elionor of Sicily, 1325–1375: A Mediterranean Queen of Two Worlds. Palgrave Macmillan.
- Matilla, Enrique Rodríguez-Picavea (1999). La Corona de Aragón (in Spanish). Ediciones Akal, S.A.
- Roebert, Sebastian (2020). Die Königin im Zentrum der Macht. Reginale Herrschaft in der Krone Aragón am Beispiel Eleonores von Sizilien (1349-1375). Berlin: de Gruyter. ISBN 978-3-11-064081-6.

Royal titles
Preceded by Eleanor of Portugal	Queen consort of Aragon; 1349–1375	Succeeded by Sibila of Fortia
