= List of Sicilian monarchs =

Coat of arms of the Kingdom of Sicily (14th century).

The monarchs of Sicily ruled from the establishment of the Kingdom of Sicily in 1130 until the "perfect fusion" in the Kingdom of the Two Sicilies in 1816.

The origins of the Sicilian monarchy lie in the Norman conquest of southern Italy which occurred between the 11th and 12th century. Sicily, which was ruled as an Islamic emirate for at least two centuries, was invaded in 1071 by Norman House of Hauteville, who conquered Palermo and established a feudal county named the County of Sicily. The House of Hauteville completed their conquest of Sicily in 1091.

In 1130, the County of Sicily and the County of Apulia, ruled by different branches of the House of Hauteville, merged as the Kingdom of Sicily, and Count Roger II was crowned king by Antipope Anacletus II. In 1282, after the Sicilian Vespers, the kingdom split into separate states: the properly named "Ultra Sicily" (Siciliae ultra Pharum, Latin for "Sicily over the Strait") and "Hither Sicily" (Siciliae citra, commonly called "the Kingdom of Naples"). Definitive unification occurred in 1816, when Ferdinand IV and III made the two entities into a single state, the Kingdom of the Two Sicilies.

== Kings of Sicily ==
Roger II received royal investiture from Antipope Anacletus II in 1130 and recognition from Pope Innocent II in 1139. The Kingdom of Sicily, which by then comprised not only the island, but also the southern third of the Italian peninsula, rapidly expanded itself to include Malta and the Mahdia, the latter if only briefly.

Genealogy of the Hautevilles and the Kings of Sicily

Kings of Sicily Family Tree

Tancred of Hauteville
William Iron Arm (d. 1046); 1st count of Apulia (1042–1046)	Drogo, 2nd count of Apulia (1046–1051)	Humphrey; 3rd count of Apulia (1051–1057)	Robert Guiscard; 4th count (1057–1059) and 1st duke of Apulia(1059–1085)	Roger I Bosso or the Grand Count Roger; 1031–1101; C. of Sicily r. 1071–1101	Hauteville dynasty
Bohemond I c. 1054 – 1111 mother repudiated Prince of Taranto, 1088; Prince of Antioch,1098 m. Constance d. of Philip I of France	Roger Borsa c. 1061 – 1111; 2nd duke of Apulia, 1085	Simon; 1093–1105 r. 1101–1105	Roger II the Great; 1095–1154; C. of Sicily r. 1105–1154 & D. of Apulia, 1127; 1st. K. of Sicily, 1130
Bohemond II; 1107/1108 – 1130; Prince of Taranto r.1111-1128 Prince of Antioch r. 1111/1119-1130	Roger III Borsa; 1118–1148 heir, D. of Apulia	William I the Bad; 1131–1166; 2nd K. of Sicily r. 1154–1166	Constance I 1154–1198; 7th Q. of Sicily, r. 1194–1198	Henry I 1165–1197; 8th K. of Sicily (Jure uxoris), r. 1194–1197; Holy Roman Emperor, 1191	House of Hohenstaufen
Constance of Antioch c. 1128–1163 ruling Princess of Antioch r. 1130-1160 m. Raymond of Poitiers, 2m. Raynald of Châtillon	Tancred I (illeg.); 1138–1194; C. of Lecce, 1168; 4th K. of Sicily r. 1189–1194	William II the Good; 1155–1189; 3rd K. of Sicily r. 1166–1189	Frederick II Roger; 1194–1250; 9th K. of Sicily r. 1198–1250; Holy Roman Emperor, 1212
Bohemond III the Child or the Stammerer of Poiters c. 1148–1201; Prince of Antioch r. 1163–1201	Roger III (co-king); 1175–1193; 5th K. of Sicily, r. 1193	William III; 1186–1198; 6th K. of Sicily, r. 1194	Henry II; 1211–1242; 10th/co - K. of Sicilyr. 1212–1217	Conrad I 1228–1254; 11th K. of Sicily r. 1250–1254	Manfred; 1232–1266; 13th K. of Sicily r. 1258–1266
Charles I 1226–1285; 14th K. of Sicily, but really Naples r. 1266–1282	Conrad II (Conradin); 1252–1268; 12th K. of Sicily r. 1254–1258	Capetian House of Anjou
Charles II (Mainland territories); 1254–1309	Peter I 1239–1285 r. 1282–1285	Constance II; 1249–1302; 15th 12th Q. of Sicily r. 1282–1285 (pretender from 1268)	Aragon
Eleanor; 1289–1341	Frederick II; 1272–1337 r. 1296–1337	James (II of Aragon); 1267–1327 r. 1285–1295
Peter II; 1305–1342 r. 1337–1342	Alfonso; 1299–1336
Frederick III; 1341–1377 r. 1355–1377	Louis I 1337–1355 r. 1342–1355	Eleanor; 1325–1375	Peter; 1319–1387
Martin II; 1356–1410 r. 1409–1410	Eleanor; 1358–1382
Maria I 1363–1401 r. 1377–1401	Martin I 1374–1409 r. 1395–1409	Ferdinand I 1380–1416 r. 1412–1416	House of Trastámara
John I 1398–1479 r. 1458–1479	Alfonso I 1396–1458 r. 1416–1458
Ferdinand II; 1452–1516 r. 1479–1516
Joanna I 1479–1555 r. 1516–1555
House of Habsburg	Charles II; 1500–1558 r. 1516–1554	Ferdinand; 1503–1564
Philip I 1527–1598 r. 1554–1598	Charles; 1540–1590
Catherine Michelle; 1567–1597	Philip II; 1578–1621 r. 1598–1621	Ferdinand; 1578–1637
House of Savoy	Victor Amadeus; 1587–1637	Philip III; 1605–1665 r. 1621–1665	Maria Anna; 1606–1646	Ferdinand; 1608–1657
Charles Emmanuel; 1634–1675	Maria Theresa; 1638–1683	Charles III; 1661–1700 r. 1665–1700	Leopold; 1640–1705
Victor Amadeus; 1666–1732 r. 1713–1720	Louis; 1661–1711	Charles IV; 1685–1740 r.1720–1735
House of Bourbon-Anjou	Philip IV; 1683–1746 r. 1700–1713
Charles V 1716–1788 r. 1735–1759
Ferdinand III; 1751–1825 r. 1759–1816

=== House of Hauteville, 1130–1198 ===
Name	Portrait	Birth	Marriage(s)	Death	Claim
Roger II; 1130–1154	Roger II	22 December 1095; Mileto son of Roger I of Sicily and Adelaide del Vasto	Elvira of Castile; 1117; 6 children Sibyl of Burgundy; 1149; 2 children Beatrix of Rethel; 1151; 1 child	26 February 1154; Palermo aged 58	Papal bull by Antipope Anacletus II
William I the Bad; 1154–1166	William I	1121 son of Roger II and Elvira of Castile	Margaret of Navarre; 4 children	7 May 1166; Palermo aged 45	Son of Roger II Agnatic primogeniture
William II the Good; 1166–1189	William II	1155 son of William I and Margaret of Navarre	Joan of England; February 1177; 1 child	11 November 1189; Palermo aged 34	Son of William I Agnatic primogeniture
Tancred; 1189–1194 (joint rule)	Tancred	1138 illegitimate son of Roger III, Duke of Apulia	Sibylla of Acerra; 6 children	20 February 1194; Palermo aged 56	Illegitimate grandson of Roger II Seizure
Roger III; 1193 (joint rule)	Hauteville	1175 son of Tancred of Sicily and Sibylla of Acerra	Irene Angelina no children	24 December 1193 aged 18	Son of Tancred Agnatic primogeniture
William III; 1194	William III	1190 son of Tancred and Sibylla of Acerra	never married	1198 aged 8	Son of Tancred I Agnatic primogeniture
Constance I 1194–1198	Constance	2 November 1154 daughter of Roger II and Beatrix of Rethel	Henry VI, Holy Roman Emperor; 1184; 1 child	27 November 1198; Palermo aged 44	Posthumous daughter of Roger II Right of Conquest

Constance was married to the Emperor Henry VI and he pressed his claim to the kingdom from William II's death, but only succeeded in displacing his wife's family in 1194.

There is evidence that, during the baronial revolt of 1197, there was an attempt to make Count Jordan Lupin of Bovino king in opposition to Henry VI. He may even have been crowned and seems to have had the support of Constance, who had turned against her husband. In the end he was captured and executed. He is accepted as a pretender to the throne by modern historians Evelyn Jamison and Thomas Curtis Van Cleve.

=== House of Hohenstaufen, 1194–1266 ===
Name	Portrait	Birth	Marriage(s)	Death	Claim
Henry I 1194–1197	Henry (I)	November 1165; Nijmegen son of Frederick I, Holy Roman Emperor and Beatrix of Burgundy	Constance of Sicily; 1184; 1 child	28 September 1197; Messina aged 32	Husband of Constance Jure uxoris
Frederick II; 1198–1250 (joint rule)	Frederick I	26 December 1194; Jesi son of Henry I and Constance I	Constance of Aragon; 15 August 1209; 1 child Isabella II of Jerusalem; 9 November 1225; 2 children Isabella of England; 15 July 1235; 4 children	13 December 1250; Torremaggiore aged 55	Son of Constance Jure matris
Henry II; 1212–1217 (joint rule)	Henry (II)	1211; Sicily son of Frederick II and Constance of Aragon	Margaret of Austria; 29 November 1225; 2 children	12 February 1242; Martirano aged 30	Son of Frederick II Agnatic primogeniture
Conrad I 1250–1254	Conrad I	25 April 1228; Andria son of Frederick II and Isabella II of Jerusalem	Elisabeth of Bavaria; 1 September 1246; 1 child	21 May 1254; Lavello aged 26	Son of Frederick II Agnatic primogeniture
Conrad II the Younger aka Conradin; 1254–1258	Conrad II	25 March 1252; Wolfstein son of Conrad I and Elisabeth of Bavaria	never married	29 October 1268; Naples aged 16 (executed)	Son of Conrad I Agnatic primogeniture
Manfred; 1258–1266	Manfred of Sicily	1232; Illegitimate son of Frederick II	Beatrice of Savoy; 21 April 1247; 1 child Helena Angelina Doukaina; 9 November 1255; 5 children	26 February 1266; Battle of Benevento aged 34 (killed in action)	Illegitimate son of Frederick II Seizure

Manfred was regent of Sicily for his nephew, the child Conrad II ("Conradin"), but took the crown in 1258, and continued to fight to keep the kingdom under the Hohenstaufen. In 1254 the pope, having declared the kingdom a Papal possession, offered the crown to the King of England's son, Edmund Crouchback, but the English never succeeded in taking the kingdom. In 1262 the pope reversed his previous decision and granted the kingdom to the King of France's brother, Charles of Anjou, who succeeded in dispossessing Manfred in 1266. Conradin continued his claim to the throne until his death by decapitation perpetrated by Charles of Anjou in 1268.

==== House of Plantagenet ====
Edmund Crouchback, son of King Henry III of England, claimed the Crown of Sicily between 1254 and 1263. Both he and his father took the claim very seriously, but it was completely ineffectual.

=== Capetian House of Anjou, 1266–1282 ===
Name	Portrait	Birth	Marriage(s)	Death
Charles I 1266–1282	Charles I	21 March 1227 son of Louis VIII of France and Blanche of Castile	Beatrice of Provence; 31 January 1246; 6 children Margaret of Nevers; 18 November 1268 childless	7 January 1285; Foggia aged 57

Peter III of Aragon, Manfred's son in law, of the House of Barcelona, conquered the island of Sicily from Charles I in 1282 and had himself crowned King of Sicily. Thereafter the old Kingdom of Sicily was centred on the mainland, with capital at Naples, and although informally called Kingdom of Naples it was still known formally as "Kingdom of Sicily". Thus, there were two "Sicilies" — the island kingdom, however, was often called "Sicily beyond the Lighthouse" or "Trinacria", by terms of a treaty between the two states.

=== House of Barcelona, 1282–1410 ===
Name	Portrait	Birth	Marriage(s)	Death	Claim
Constance II; 1268/1282–1285 (joint rule)	Constance II	1249; Sicily daughter of Manfred of Sicily and Beatrice of Savoy	Peter I the Great; 13 June 1262; 6 children	9 April 1302; Barcelona, Spain aged 52 or 53	Daughter of Manfred of Sicily Right of conquest
Peter I the Great; 1282–1285 (joint rule)	Peter I	1240; Valencia son of James I of Aragon and Yolanda of Hungary	Constance of Sicily; 13 June 1262; 6 children	2 November 1285; Vilafranca del Penedès aged 45	Husband of Constance II Jure uxoris
James the Just; 1285–1295	James	10 August 1267; Valencia son of Peter I and Constance of Sicily	Isabella of Castile; 1 December 1291; No children Blanche of Anjou; 29 October 1295; 10 children Marie de Lusignan; 15 June 1315; No children Elisenda de Montcada; 25 December 1322; No children	5 November 1327; Barcelona aged 60	Son of Peter I and Constance II Salic patrimony
Frederick III; 1295–1337	Aragon	13 December 1272; Barcelona son of Peter I and Constance of Sicily	Eleanor of Anjou; 17 May 1302; 9 children	25 June 1337; Palermo aged 65	Regent brother of James Election
Peter II; 1337–1342	Aragon	July 1305 son of Frederick III and Eleanor of Anjou	Elisabeth of Carinthia; 23 April 1322; 9 children	15 August 1342; Calascibetta aged 37	Son of Frederick III Agnatic primogeniture
Louis; 1342–1355	Aragon	1337; Catania son of Peter II and Elisabeth of Carinthia	Never married	16 October 1355; Aci Castello aged 18	Son of Peter II Agnatic primogeniture
Frederick IV the Simple; 1355–1377	Aragon	1 September 1341; Catania son of Peter II and Elisabeth of Carinthia	Constance of Aragon; 11 April 1361; 1 child Antonia of Balzo; 17 January 1372; No children	27 January 1377; Messina aged 36	Son of Peter II; Brother of Louis Agnatic primogeniture
Maria; 1377–1401 (joint rule)	Aragon	1363; Catania daughter of Frederick III and Constance of Aragon	Martin I of Sicily; 1390; 1 child	25 May 1401; Lentini aged 38	Daughter of Frederick III Cognatic primogeniture
Martin I the Younger; 1390–1409 (joint rule)	Aragon	1374 son of Martin I of Aragon (Martin II of Sicily) and Maria of Luna	Maria of Sicily; 1390; 1 child	25 July 1409; Cagliari aged 35	Husband of Maria Jure uxoris
Martin II the Elder; 1409–1410	Martin II	1356; Girona son of Peter IV of Aragon and Eleanor of Sicily	Maria de Luna; 13 June 1372; 4 children Margarita of Aragon-Prades; 1409; No children	31 May 1410; Barcelona aged 54	Maternal grandson of Peter II Cognatic primogeniture

Martin II of Sicily died without an heir in 1410 and the kingdom was inherited by his nephew.

=== House of Trastámara, 1412–1516 ===
Name	Portrait	Birth	Marriage(s)	Death
Ferdinand I the Honest; 1412–1416	Ferdinand I	27 November 1380; Medina del Campo son of John I of Castile and Eleanor of Aragon	Eleanor of Alburquerque; 1394; 8 children	2 April 1416; Igualada aged 36
Alfonso the Magnanimous; 1416–1458	Alfonso	1396; Medina del Campo son of Ferdinand I and Eleanor of Alburquerque	Maria of Castile; 1415; No children	27 June 1458; Naples aged 52
John the Great; 1458–1468	Ferdinand II	29 June 1397; Medina del Campo son of Ferdinand I and Eleanor of Alburquerque	Blanche I of Navarre; 6 November 1419; 4 children Juana Enríquez; 2 children	20 January 1479; Barcelona aged 81
Ferdinand II the Catholic; 1468–1516	Ferdinand II	10 March 1452 son of John II of Aragon and Juana Enriquez	Isabella I of Castile; 19 October 1469; 5 children Germaine of Foix; 1505; No children	23 January 1516; Madrigalejo aged 63
Joanna the Mad; 1516–1555	Joanna	6 November 1479 daughter of Ferdinand II of Aragon and Isabella I of Castile	Philip IV of Burgundy; 1496; 6 children	12 April 1555; Madrigalejo aged 75

Joanna was confined under alleged insanity during her whole reign.

=== House of Habsburg, 1516–1700 ===
Name	Portrait	Birth	Marriage(s)	Death
Charles II; 1516–1554	Charles I	24 February 1500; Ghent son of Philip I of Castile and Joanna of Castile	Isabella of Portugal; 10 March 1526; 3 children	21 September 1558; Yuste aged 58
Philip I 1554–1598	Philip I	21 May 1527; Valladolid son of Charles I and Isabella of Portugal	Maria of Portugal; 1543; 1 child Mary I of England; 1554; No children Elisabeth of Valois; 1559; 2 children Anna of Austria; 4 May 1570; 5 children	13 September 1598; Madrid aged 71
Philip II; 1598–1621	Philip II	14 April 1578; Madrid son of Philip I and Anna of Austria	Margaret of Austria; 18 April 1599; 5 children	31 March 1621; Madrid aged 42
Philip III; 1621–1665	Philip III	8 April 1605; Valladolid son of Philip II and Margaret of Austria	Elisabeth of Bourbon; 1615; 7 children Mariana of Austria; 1649; 5 children	17 September 1665; Madrid aged 60
Charles III; 1665–1700	Charles II	6 November 1661; Madrid son of Philip III and Mariana of Austria	Maria Luisa of Orléans; 19 November 1679; No children Maria Anna of Neuburg; 14 May 1690; No children	1 November 1700; Madrid aged 38

=== House of Bourbon, 1700–1713, during War of the Spanish Succession ===
Name	Portrait	Birth	Marriage(s)	Death
Philip IV; 1700–1713	Charles V	19 December 1683; Versailles son of Louis, Dauphin of France and Maria Anna of Bavaria	Maria Luisa of Savoy; 2 November 1701; 4 children Elisabeth of Parma; 24 December 1714; 7 children	9 July 1746; Madrid aged 62

At the end of the War of the Spanish Succession, by the Treaty of Utrecht, Sicily was ceded to the Duke of Savoy.

=== House of Savoy, 1713–1720 ===
Name	Portrait	Birth	Marriage(s)	Death
Victor Amadeus; 1713–1720	Victor Amadeus	14 May 1666; Turin son of Charles Emmanuel II, Duke of Savoy and Marie Jeanne Baptiste de Savoie-Nemours	Anne Marie of Orléans; 10 April 1684; 6 children	31 October 1732; Moncalieri aged 66

The Spanish invaded the kingdom in 1718 during the War of the Quadruple Alliance. The Duke of Savoy ceded it to Austria in 1720 by the Treaty of The Hague.

=== House of Habsburg, 1720–1735 ===
Name	Portrait	Birth	Marriage(s)	Death
Charles IV; 1720–1735	Charles III	1 October 1685; Vienna son of Leopold I, Holy Roman Emperor and Eleonore-Magdalena of Pfalz-Neuburg	Elisabeth Christine; 1 August 1708; 4 children	20 October 1740; Vienna aged 55

Charles I, Duke of Parma conquered the kingdom during the War of the Polish Succession. At the end of the war, Sicily was ceded to him as Charles III of Sicily.

=== House of Bourbon 1735–1816 ===
Name	Portrait	Birth	Marriage(s)	Death
Charles V 1735–1759	Charles III	20 January 1716; Madrid son of Philip IV and Elizabeth of Parma	Maria Amalia of Saxony; 1738; 13 children	14 December 1788; Madrid aged 72
Ferdinand III; 1759–1816	Ferdinand IV	12 January 1751; Naples son of Charles III and Maria Amalia of Saxony	Marie Caroline of Austria; 12 May 1768; 17 children Lucia Migliaccio of Floridia; 27 November 1814; No children	4 January 1825; Naples aged 73

In 1816 the Kingdom of Naples and the Kingdom of Sicily were merged as the new Kingdom of the Two Sicilies.

=== House of Bourbon-Two Sicilies 1816–1861 ===
Portrait	Coat of arms	Name	Reign		Relationship with predecessor(s)	Title
		Ferdinand I (Ferdinando I)	12 December 1816	4 January 1825	• Son of Charles III of Spain	King of the Two Sicilies (Rè delle Due Sicilie)
		Francis I (Francesco I)	4 January 1825	8 November 1830	• Son of Ferdinand I	King of the Two Sicilies (Rè delle Due Sicilie)
		Ferdinand II (Ferdinando II)	8 November 1830	22 May 1859	• Son of Francis I	King of the Two Sicilies (Rè delle Due Sicilie)
		Francis II (Francesco II)	22 May 1859	17 March 1861	• Son of Ferdinand II	King of the Two Sicilies (Rè delle Due Sicilie)

== See also ==
- List of Sicilian consorts
- List of viceroys of Sicily
- County of Apulia and Calabria
- List of monarchs of Naples
- List of monarchs of the Two Sicilies
