= Sibila de Fortià =

Queen of Aragon from 1377 to 1387

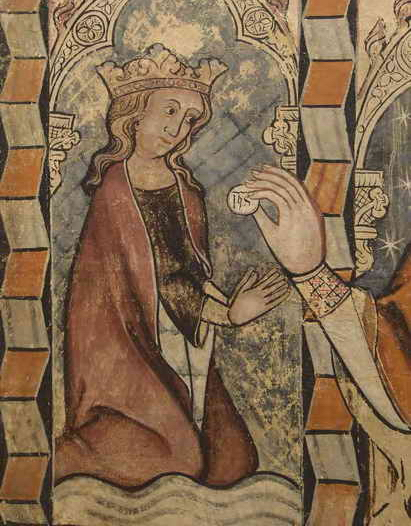
- Image of Sibila of Fortià in San Miguel de Daroca

Queen consort of Aragon
- Tenure: 11 October 1377 – 6 January 1387
- Coronation: January 1381 (Zaragoza)
- Died: 24 November 1406; Barcelona, Principality of Catalonia
- Burial: Sant Francesc (Framenors); Pantheon of Poblet; Cathedral of Barcelona
- Spouse: Artal de Foces; Peter IV of Aragon
- Issue: Isabella, Countess of Urgel
- Father: Berenguer de Fortià
- Mother: Francesca de Vilamarí

Sibila de Fortià (died 1406), Queen of Aragon, was daughter of Berenguer de Fortià and his wife Francesca de Vilamarí. Sibila belonged to the family of Fortià, of the lower nobility, with possessions in rural Empordà, in the County of Empúries. She was the fourth wife of Peter IV of Aragon.

== Early life ==
Sibila was said to be a natural beauty in her early adulthood. She married her first husband, Artal de Foces on an unknown date. Upon her widowhood, Sibila became a lady in waiting to Peter's third wife, Eleanor of Sicily, during the royal couple's stay in Sibila's home of Empordà. Eleanor died in 1375; she had left Peter two surviving sons and one daughter.

Sibila attracted the attention of the king soon after Eleanor's death, when Sibila was in her twenties and Peter was fifty six. When the king's sons, Martin and John, found out what was happening, they opposed their father's remarriage, as it could cause dynastic problems. The marriage announcement of the lovers led to tense relations between the king and his sons.

== Second marriage: Queen of Aragon ==
On 11 October 1377, in Barcelona, Sibila married Peter IV of Aragon, becoming his fourth wife. It's believed that before the marriage, Sibila gave birth to a son, Alfonso, who only lived for a year. The child's birth has been doubted, as the only record of his birth is in the Chronicle of Peter IV of Aragon.

The couple had three children:

- Alfonso of Aragon (1376 – 1377), Count of Morella.
- Peter of Aragon (born and died April 1379).
- Isabella of Aragon (1380–1424), married James II of Urgell and was mother of Isabella of Urgell, Duchess of Coimbra. Through Isabella, Peter and Sibila are ancestors to Joana, Princess of Portugal and John II of Portugal.

Over time, things grew worse. Sibila's family were invited to court, and the king began to favor Sibila's brother, Bernard. Peter, Sibila and her family formed one faction of the court, the other being composed of Peter's son and heir, John, his French wife Violant of Bar, and their followers.

== Widowhood ==
Arms as Queen Consort

After Peter died in 1387, John and Violant became King and Queen of Aragon, and they wanted to be rid of Sibila. For her own safety, Sibila fled to Sant Martí Sarroca; where her stepdaughter Eleanor of Aragon had lived before her death. Sibila did not stay there long, as she was forced to return to Aragon on the command of John and Violant.

They did not execute Sibila but sent her to live in Barcelona under close surveillance; however, she was treated better there than at the royal court. After John died in 1396, and Martin succeeded him, Sibila remained in Barcelona.

== Death and burial ==
Sibila died in Barcelona on 24 November 1406. By order of King Martin she had a state funeral. She was buried in the convent of Sant Francesc (Framenors) in Barcelona, traditional burial place of kings and queens of Aragon. She was later transferred to the pantheon of Poblet.

When the convent was demolished in the nineteenth century, Sibila and others were reburied on 20 April 1852 at the Cathedral of Barcelona. She was the first deposited in a box embedded in the wall of the chapel of the Martyrs of the cloister, covered by Isabella II of Spain, and on 13 October 1998, moved inside the temple, in a box placed on the wall to the left of the altar major.

== In popular culture ==
- The aftermath of King John's death and Sibila's capture from Sant Martí Sarroca is dramatized in the 2022 Spanish television series, Heirs to the Land.

== Bibliography ==
- E. Albertí, ladies, queens, abbesses: Eighteen female figures in medieval Catalonia, Barcelona, Alberto, 2007.
- J. Nonell Bassegoda, "The Royal Tombs of the Cathedral of Barcelona", Bulletin de la Real Academia Catalana de Belles Arts de Sant Jordi, 13 (1999), 237-255.
- A. Boscolo, Fortià di Sibila, regina d'Aragona, Padua, CEDAM, 1970 [trad. Catalan: Queen Sibylla of Fortià, Barcelona, Rafael Dalmau, 1971].
- L. Riber, Fortis Sibila, Madrid, Ediciones y Publicaciones Españolas, 1944, pp. 13–55.
- J. M. Roca, "La Reyna ampurdanesan" Sovereignty of Catalonia: collection of historical monographs, Barcelona, Fundació Concepció Rabell and Cibils, widow Romaguera, 1928, pp. 9–211.
- R. Tasis and Mark, The King lives in Pere III, Barcelona, Aedos, 1954

Royal titles
Preceded by Eleanor of Sicily	Queen consort of Aragon; 1377–1387	Succeeded by Violante de Bar
