= Euphemia of Sicily =

Regent of Sicily from 1355 to 1357

Euphemia of Sicily (1330–1359) was a Sicilian princess regent. She ruled the Kingdom of Sicily as regent from 1355 until 1357 during the minority reign of her brother, King Frederick the Simple.

== Life ==
She was the daughter of King Peter II and his wife, Elisabeth of Carinthia.

Her father died in 1342 and her brother Louis succeeded him under the regency of their uncle and, from 1348, their mother. When their mother died in 1352, her sister succeeded her mother as regent during the minority of her brother.

In 1355 she succeeded her sister Constance as regent, after the latter succumbed to the Black Death. Her regency had made marriage difficult, and she died unmarried.

When Naples attacked Sicily, regent Euphemia organized the defense of the island and managed to push back the invasion in the Battle of Aci on 27 May 1357.

Her mandate as regent finished when her brother was declared of legal majority in 1357.

Euphemia died childless in 1359.
