= Blasco II Alagona =

Nobleman in 14th century Sicily

Blasco II Alagona (died 23 October 1355), called Blasco the Younger, was a nobleman in fourteenth century Sicily.

== Early life and family ==
Born in Sicily in the late 13th century, he was the grandson and successor of Blasco the Elder. The family originated in Alagón.

== Career ==
Blasco was very close to the ruling house, also of Aragonese origin, and received many favours from them. The Alagona family was the most powerful in Catania at first and then eastern and eventually, under Blasco II, all of Sicily. In 1320, Frederick II of Sicily ceded the Castle of Aci, expropriated from Margherita, descendant of the Admiral Roger of Lauria, to Blasco. In 1326, Blasco defended the city of Palermo from the Angevins. While there, Beltrando del Balzo pillaged Aci.

During the reign of Peter II, Blasco was the Grand Justiciar of the realm. Giovanni of Randazzo, brother of Peter, appointed him regent for his nephew, the young King Louis. As regent, Blasco was opposed by Matteo Palizzi, lord of Tripi and Saponara and vicar of the realm.

== Death and legacy ==
He was killed in a revolt of Messina in 1355. He was succeeded by his son Artale I d'Alagona.
