= Maria, Queen of Sicily =

Sicilian monarch from 1377 to 1401

Maria
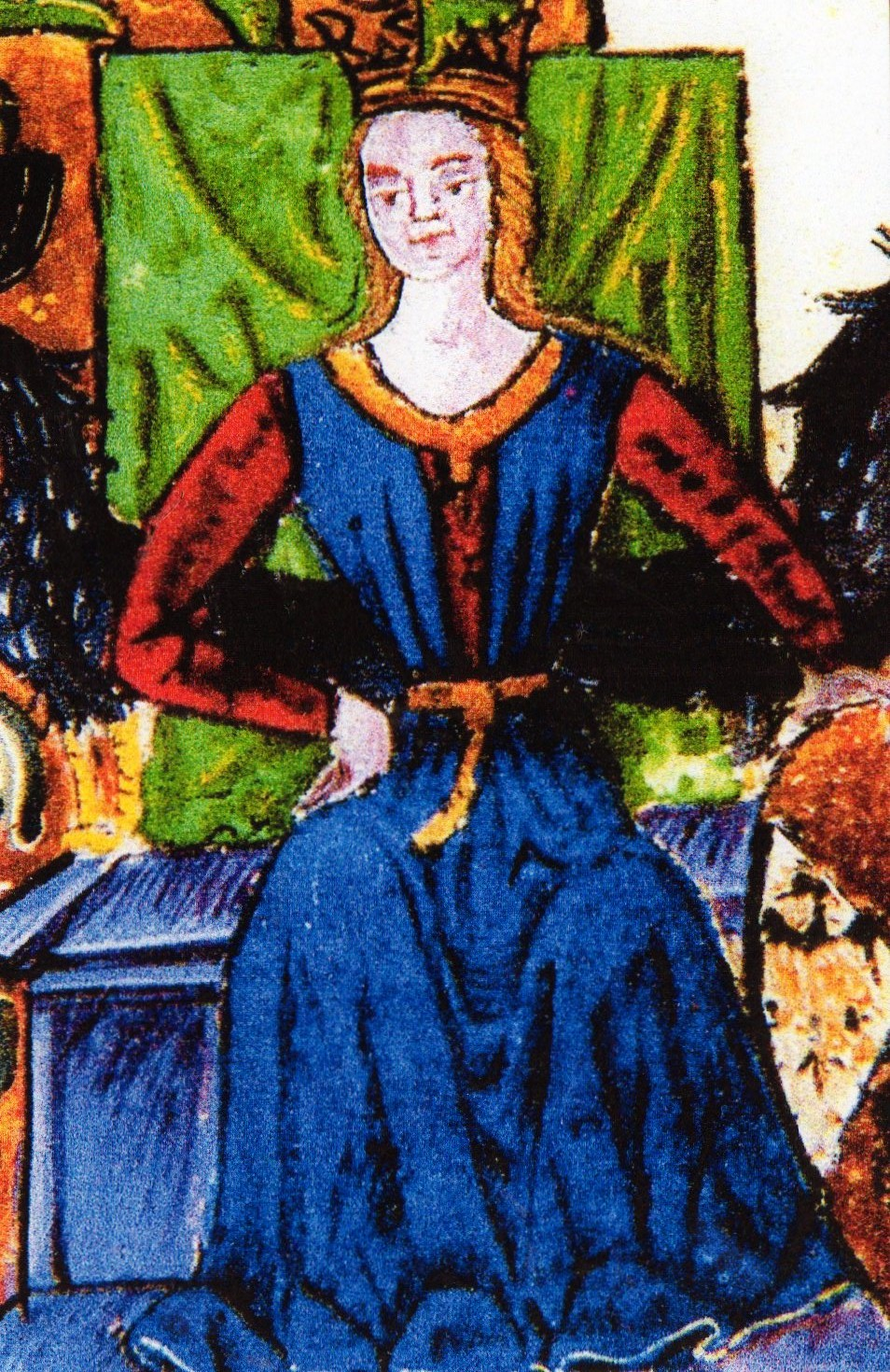

Queen of Sicily
- Reign: 27 July 1377 – 25 May 1401
- Coronation: 1377, Palermo
- Predecessor: Frederick the Simple
- Successor: Martin the Younger
- Co-ruler: Martin the Younger (from 1390)
- Born: 2 July 1363; Catania, Kingdom of Sicily
- Died: 25 May 1401 (aged 37); Lentini, Kingdom of Sicily
- Burial: Cathedral of St Agatha, Catania, Kingdom of Sicily
- Spouse: Martin the Younger
- Issue: Peter of Sicily
- House: Aragón
- Father: Frederick the Simple
- Mother: Constance of Aragon

Maria (2 July 1363 – 25 May 1401) was Queen of Sicily and Duchess of Athens and Neopatria from 1377 until her death.

== Accession to the Sicilian Throne ==
Born in Catania, Maria was the daughter and heir of Frederick the Simple by his first wife Constance of Aragon. After her father's death in 1377, she ascended the Sicilian throne. Her government, however, was effectively taken over. She was only thirteen years old at the time, and the four baronial families who claimed her power styled themselves "vicars."

One of the Vicars, Artale I d'Alagona, was previously named regent by Maria's father. In 1360—seventeen years before Queen Maria's ascension—Alagona had burnt and razed to the ground Augusta, an important fortified city, using forces from Syracuse and Catania. However, Alagona's regency failed because of conflicts between the "Sicilian" and "Aragonese" parties, and he was forced to form a government with three other Vicars instead. The four baronial families were chosen to represent and equally distribute power between the Sicilian and Aragonese factions.

== Unrest during the Vicars' Reign ==
Starting in 1377, the Kingdom of Sicily was ruled by four Vicars: Artale I Alagona, Count of Mistretta, Francesco II Ventimiglia, Count of Geraci, Manfredi III Chiaramonte, Count of Modica, and Guglielmo Peralta, Count of Caltabellotta. The composition of the College of Vicars was intended to include a parity of exponents of the "Sicilian" and "Aragonese" parties. However, the four men ruled effectively in their separate baronial lands alone. In 1379, Queen Maria was kidnapped by Guglielmo Raimondo III of Moncada, Marquis of Malta and Gozzo, a Sicilian nobleman and member of the Aragonese House of Montcada, who had been specifically excluded from the government by Alagona. Moncada intended to prevent Maria's planned marriage to Giangaleazzo Visconti, Duke of Milan, and held her for two years first at Augusta, then at Licata. Moncada's actions had been approved by Maria's grandfather, King Peter IV of Aragon, but naturally provoked opposition, particularly by his rivals Alagona and Chiaramonte, who proceeded to attack Moncada's fortresses. In 1381, Moncada turned Maria over to the envoys of Peter IV, and in 1382 she was rescued from the advancing forces of Chiaramonte by an Aragonese fleet; she was taken first to Sardinia, then, in 1384, to Aragon, where she was married to her cousin Martin of Aragon in 1390.

== Co-reign with Martin the Younger ==
In 1392 Maria and Martin returned with a military force and defeated the opposing barons, ruling jointly until Maria's death in 1401. At that time, Martin repudiated the Treaty of Villeneuve (1372) and ruled Sicily independently of Naples. She also survived their only son, Peter (1398–1400). The kingdom remained without a crown prince and this caused a succession crisis for Martin, who ruled by right of his wife. Frederick the Simple had named his illegitimate son, Guglielmo, Count of Malta, as heir presumptive in the case of the extinction of his daughter's line. Guglielmo had died in c. 1380, but he had a daughter, Giovanna, wife of the Sicilian nobleman Pietro di Gioeni. She, however, cannot have contested her uncle's claim since Martin continued to rule unopposed until his death.

Maria of Sicily died at Lentini in 1401.

Maria, Queen of Sicily House of Barcelona Cadet branch of the House of Barcelona Born: 2 July 1363 Died: 25 May 1401
Regnal titles
Preceded by Frederick the Simple	Queen of Sicily; 1377–1401; With: Martin the Younger	Succeeded by Martin the Younger
Preceded by Frederick the Simple	Duchess of Athens and Neopatria; 1377–1388; With: Peter IV of Aragon	Succeeded by Nerio I Acciaioli
