= John of Randazzo =

14th Century Duke of Randazzo

John, regent of Sicily
- Duke of Randazzo, Count of Malta
- Coat of arms of Aragonese Sicily

Duke of Athens & Neopatria
- Reign: 1338 - 1348
- Predecessor: William II, Duke of Athens
- Successor: Frederick I, Duke of Athens
- Born: 1317
- Died: 1348 (aged 30–31)
- Buried: Catania Cathedral
- Noble family: of Barcelona
- Spouse: Cesarea of Castalnasetta
- Issue: Frederick I, Duke of Athens; Eleanor of Aragon; Constance
- Father: Frederick II of Sicily
- Mother: Eleanor of Anjou

John (1317–1348) was duke of Randazzo, Athens and Neopatria in 1338-1348, Count of Malta and regent of Sicily (1342–1348).

The fourth son of Frederick III of Sicily and Eleanor of Anjou, he was the most powerful nobleman in Sicily during the reigns of his brother Peter and his nephew Louis, during whose minority he was regent.

He kept the peace during regency, though he supported the Catalan party over the local Italian nobility. Thus he appointed Blasco II de Alagona, a Catalan, as his successor. War broke out upon his death during the Plague.

He married Cesarea, daughter of Peter Count of Castalnasetta and had three recorded children: Frederick I who succeeded him as Duke of Athens and Neopatria; and two daughters Eleanor and Constance.

He died of the Black Plague in 1348 and was buried next to his father and nephew in the cathedral of Catania.

Preceded by William II	Duke of Athens and of Neopatria; 1338–1348	Succeeded by Frederick I
