= Lupino =

- Pronunciation: Italian: [luˈpiːno]
- Language: Italian

Origin
- Meaning: "Pertaining to or relating to the wolf"
- Region of origin: Italy

Other names
- Variant forms: Lupin (French), López (Spanish), Lopes (Portuguese), Lupu (Romanian)

Lupino, or Luppino, is a surname of Italian origin derived from the Latin lupīnus, which is said of something or someone pertaining to or relating to the wolf.

The name may refer to:

- The Lupino family of British and American actors:
  - Ida Lupino (1918–1995), Anglo-American film actress and director
  - Lupino Lane (Henry William George Lupino) (1892–1959), British actor
  - Richard Lupino (1929–2005), American actor
  - Stanley Lupino (1893–1942), English actor, dancer, and author; father of Ida Lupino
  - Wallace Lupino (1898–1961), British film actor
- Nathalie Lupino (born 1963), French judoka
- Carmine Luppino (born 1948), Italian gymnast
- The Luppino crime family, an Italian-Canadian crime family
- A lupini bean
