= Peter II of Sicily =

King of Sicily from 1337 to 1342

Peter II
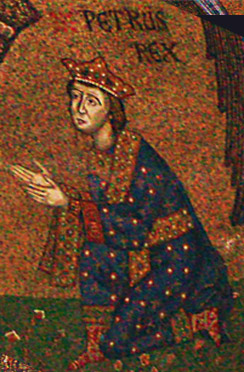
- Peter kneeling before Christ, from a mosaic in the cathedral of Messina

King of Sicily
- Reign: 25 June 1337 – 15 August 1342
- Predecessor: Frederick III
- Successor: Louis
- Born: 1305; Altofonte, Kingdom of Sicily
- Died: 15 August 1342; Calascibetta, Kingdom of Sicily
- Burial: Cathedral of Palermo
- Spouse: Elisabeth of Carinthia
- Issue more...: Constance, Regent of Sicily; Eleanor, Queen of Aragon; Beatrice, Countess Palatine; Euphemia, Regent of Sicily; Louis I the Child; Frederick IV the Simple; Blanche, Countess of Ampurias
- House: Barcelona
- Father: Frederick III of Sicily
- Mother: Eleanor of Anjou

Peter II (Note: Latin: Petrus, Italian: Pietro, Sicilian: Pietru) (1304 – 8 August 1342) was the King of Sicily from 1337 until his death, although he was associated with his father as co-ruler from 1321. Peter's father was Frederick III of Sicily and his mother was Eleanor, a daughter of Charles II of Naples. His reign was marked by strife between the throne and the nobility, especially the old families of Ventimiglia, Palizzi and Chiaramonte, and by war between Sicily and Naples.

Contemporaries regarded Peter as feeble-minded. Giovanni Villani, in his Nuova Cronica, calls him "almost an imbecile" (Italianate Latin: quasi un mentacatto) and Nicola Speciale, in his Historia Sicula, calls him "pure and simple" (purus et simplex).

Under Peter, the Neapolitans conquered the Lipari Islands and took the cities of Milazzo and Termini in Sicily itself. He died after a short illness on 8 August 1342 in Calascibetta and was buried in the cathedral of Palermo. He was succeeded by Louis, his eldest son, who was only four years old.

== Marriage and children ==
He married Elisabeth of Carinthia, with whom he had nine children:

- Constance (1324 – October 1355), regent of Sicily from 1352 to 1354, unmarried
- Eleanor (1325–1375), married Peter IV of Aragon, mother of Martin II of Sicily
- Beatrice (1326–1365), married Rupert II, Elector Palatine, mother of Rupert of Germany.
- Euphemia (1330–1359), regent from 1355 to 1357, unmarried
- Louis of Sicily (1338–1355), succeeded his father
- Frederick IV (1341–1377), successor of Louis
- Violante (born 1334), died young
- John (1342 – 22 June 1353), died young
- Blanche (1342–1373), married Count John I of Empúries, but had no issue

== Sources ==
- Drees, Clayton J., ed. (2001). The Late Medieval Age of Crisis and Renewal, 1300-1500: A Biographical Dictionary. Greenwood Press.
- Grierson, Philip; Travaini, Lucia (1998). Medieval European Coinage: With a Catalogue of the Coins in the Fitzwilliam Museum, Cambridge. Vol. 14 (Italy) part 3 (South Italy, Sicily, Sardinia). Cambridge University Press.
- Hulme, Edward Maslin (1915). The Renaissance: The Protestant Revolution and The Catholic Reformation in Continental Europe. The Century Co.
- Ritzerfeld, Ulrike (2015). "The Language of Power: Transgressing Borders in Luxury Metal Object of the Lusignan". In Rogge, Sabine; Grünbart, Michael (eds.). Medieval Cyprus: a Place of Cultural Encounter. Waxmann Verlag GmbH.

Peter II of Sicily House of Barcelona Born: July 1305 Died: 15 August 1342
Regnal titles
Preceded by Frederick III	King of Sicily; 1337–1342	Succeeded by Louis
