= Kingdom of Trinacria =

Sicilian kingdom (1282–1442)

Kingdom of Trinacria: Regnu di Trinacria (Sicilian); Regno di Trinacria (Italian); Regne de Trinacria (Catalan)
- 1282–1442
- Flag Coat of arms
- Motto: Animus Tuus Dominus (Latin for 'Courage is thy Lord') (in use in the Sicilian Vespers of 1282)
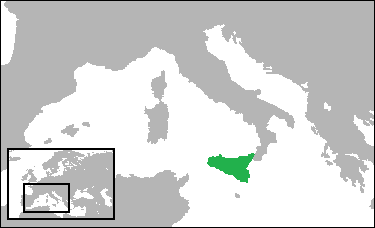
- Status: Sovereign state (until 1412); Part of the Crown of Aragon (1412–1442)
- Capital: Palermo; 38°35′31″N 16°4′44″E
- Religion: Roman Catholicism
- Demonym: Sicilian
- Government: Feudal monarchy
- King
  - 1282–1285: Peter I the Great
  - 1416–1458: Alfons V
- Legislature: Parliament
- Historical era: Middle Ages
  - Coronation of Peter III of Aragon and Constance II of Sicily in Palermo: 4 September 1282
  - Peace of Caltabellotta: 31 August 1302
  - Alfonso V conquered the Kingdom of Naples and unified both Kingdoms: 1442
Preceded by	Succeeded by
Kingdom of Sicily	Kingdom of Sicily
- Today part of: Italy; Malta

The Kingdom of Trinacria (Note: Trinacria (Greek Τρινακρία, "having three headlands") is the ancient name of Sicily island.) or the Kingdom of Sicily on the other side of the Lighthouse, was established after Sicilian Vespers in 1282, when King Peter III of Aragon ascended the throne, and was consolidated after the War of the Sicilian Vespers in 1302. According to the Peace of Caltabellota, the Kingdom of Sicily was officially divided into two parts — one of which pertained to the territory on the mainland, later called Naples — and the other relegated to the island itself — Sicily proper. Due to the overlap of titular Sicily with geopolitical Sicily, the kingdom is most often informally referred to as the Kingdom of Sicily. Its formal name — Kingdom of Trinacria — reflected the name given to the island by the local Greek population when it was an imperial province of Rome.

Since 1282, Sicily proper was ruled as an independent kingdom by relatives of the House of Barcelona, and was then added permanently to the Crown of Aragon as a result of the Compromise of Caspe in 1412. Meanwhile, the continental part of the Kingdom of Sicily, known colloquially as the Kingdom of Naples, remained under the crown of King Charles II of Anjou. The two resulting kingdoms were separated until 1442, when King Alfonso V of Aragon conquered the Kingdom of Naples and unified both Kingdoms.
