= Frederick the Simple =

King of Sicily from 1355 to 1377

Frederick IV
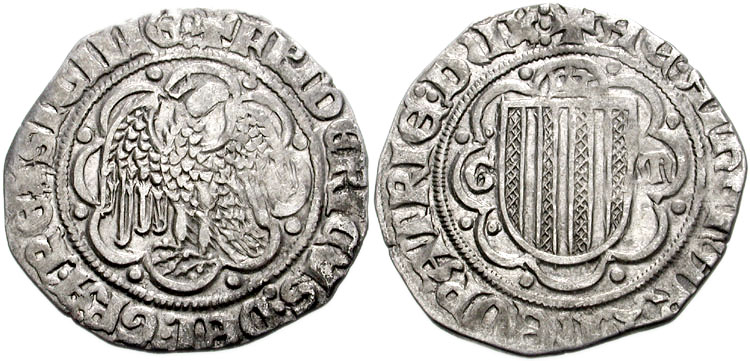
- A pierreale of Frederick the Simple

King of Sicily
- Reign: 16 October 1355 – 27 July 1377
- Predecessor: Louis
- Successor: Maria
- Born: 1 September 1341; Catania, Kingdom of Sicily
- Died: 27 July 1377 (aged 35); Messina, Kingdom of Sicily
- Spouse: Constance of Aragon; Antonia of Baux
- Issue: Maria, Queen of Sicily
- House: Barcelona
- Father: Peter II of Sicily
- Mother: Elizabeth of Carinthia

Frederick IV (or III) (in Italian, Federico; 1 September 1341 – Messina 27 July 1377), called the Simple, was King of Sicily from 1355 to 1377. He was the second son of Peter II of Sicily and Elisabeth of Carinthia. He succeeded his brother Louis. The documents of his era call him the "infante Frederick, ruler of the kingdom of Sicily", without any regnal number.

"Frederick the Simple" is often confused with an earlier Sicilian monarch, his grandfather Frederick III, who chose to call himself "Frederick III" even though he was actually only the second King Frederick to occupy the Sicilian throne; his self-appellation was sometimes retained by later generations of genealogists and historians, producing rival numberings of Sicilian kings named Frederick. The first King Frederick on the Sicilian throne was the latter's great-grandfather, King Frederick II, Holy Roman Emperor.

Frederick the Simple was born in Catania and succeeded his brother Louis in 1355 under the regency of his sister, Euphemia of Sicily. In his youth the reign was under the control of powerful Sicilian barons, in particular of Artale I Alagona. The beginning of Frederick IV's reign was also plagued by the Black Death, to which his elder brother and predecessor had succumbed. On 25 December 1369, Frederick ordered all Jews to wear a badge indicating their heritage. The badge consisted of a piece of red material, not smaller than the largest royal seal; men were required to wear it under the chin, and women on the chest. In 1372 he was able to come to peace terms with Naples and Pope Gregory XI, obtaining the title of tributary King of "Trinacria".

After the death of his mother's cousin, Margaret of Tyrol in 1369, Frederick remained the sole descendant of the House of Gorizia-Tyrol which had ruled a vast territory in the Eastern Alps, comprising Tyrol, Carinthia and Carniola. However, due to his problems at home, he is not known to have ever raised any claims to those territories which thus passed to the Habsburgs.

== Marriages ==
On 11 April 1361, Frederick married firstly Constance of Aragon, daughter of King Peter IV of Aragon. They had only one daughter, Maria.

On 17 January 1372, Frederick married secondly Antonia of Baux. This marriage was designed to seal the Treaty of Villeneuve of 1372, by which Frederick's right to rule Sicily was recognised by Naples and the Papacy. There were no children from this marriage. Frederick was betrothed again to Antonia Visconti, but he died before the wedding and was succeeded by his only child, Queen Maria.

== Sources ==
- Grierson, Philip; Travaini, Lucia (1998). Medieval European Coinage: With a Catalogue of the Coins in the Fitzwilliam Museum, Cambridge. Vol. 14 (Italy) part 3 (South Italy, Sicily, Sardinia). Cambridge University Press.

Regnal titles
Preceded by Louis	King of Sicily; 1355–1377	Succeeded by Maria
Preceded by Frederick I	Duke of Athens and of Neopatria; 1355–1377	Succeeded by Maria
