= Constance of Aragon, Queen of Sicily =

Queen consort of Sicily from 1361 to 1363

Constance

Queen consort of Sicily
- Reign: 11 April 1361 – 18 July 1363
- Born: 1343; Royal Monastery of Santa Maria de Poblet, Kingdom of Aragon
- Died: 18 July 1363 (aged 19–20); Kingdom of Sicily
- Burial: Cathedral of St Agatha, Catania, Kingdom of Sicily
- Spouse: Frederick the Simple (m. 1361 – 1363)
- Issue: Maria of Sicily
- House: Barcelona
- Father: Peter IV of Aragon
- Mother: Maria of Navarre

Constance of Aragon (Catalan: Constança; 1343 – 2/18 July 1363), was the queen of Sicily as the first wife of King Frederick the Simple. She was an infanta of Aragon, the eldest child of Peter IV of Aragon and his first wife Maria of Navarre. Her father unsuccessfully proposed her as heir to the throne in early 1347, in the absence of a male heir.

On 8 February 1351 at Perpignan, a betrothal between Constance and Louis I of Anjou, son of King John II of France, was performed. However, the marriage never took place.

On 11 April 1361 at Catania, Constance married King Frederick the Simple of Sicily. They had one daughter, Maria (2 July 1363 - 25 March 1401), who succeeded her father as reigning queen of Sicily in 1377 and married Martin of Aragon.

In 1363 Constance died in Sicily from the plague. She is buried in the Cathedral of Catania.

Royal titles
Preceded by Elisabeth of Carinthia	Queen consort of Sicily; 1361–1363	Succeeded by Antonia of Balzo
