= Count of Urgell's revolt =

Date	1413–1414
Location	Crown of Aragon
Result	Defeat of James of Urgell, dispossession of his county and titles, and capture.

Belligerents
Ferdinand of Antequera	James of Urgell

Commanders and leaders
Ferdinand of Antequera	James of Urgell

Units involved
Gascon and English cavalry	Castilian, Catalan, Aragonese, and Valencian cavalry.

The Count of Urgell's revolt was a military uprising led by James II, Count of Urgell against king Ferdinand I of Aragón in June 1413 as a result of the disagreement with the result of the Compromise of Caspe, to which James presented himself as a candidate to succeed the king of Aragón Martin I, in which the final decision of the delegates, made public on June 28 of the previous year, was not favorable.

The scenes of the uprising were the outskirts of Huesca, with the Loarre castle as the main square defended by Antón de Luna; the surroundings of Buñol, fortress belonging to the count of Urgell and Balaguer, the capital of his county.

The armed uprising, which only saw isolated episodes, was suppressed at its bases, laying siege to these three enclaves, without the rebellious troops being able to connect or generate significant adhesions, contrary to what the Count of Urgell expected; James of Urgell's initial attempt to lay siege to Lérida from his base in Balaguer at the end of June 1413 was rejected within a few days. It did not endanger the monarch nor did any major social disorders occur among the population. Due to the limited support of the nobility (the only class from which the count's cause could expect support) and through the troops summoned by the kingdoms and the principality of the Crown of Aragon, the rebellion was put down on October 31, when James II surrendered the fortress and was captured.

== Background ==
The king of Aragon Martin I the Human had great regard for James II of Urgell, whom he proposed in January 1407 to appoint as governor and viceroy of Valencia, but James did not answer nor did he go to Valencia. After the death of his father Peter II, offered him the lieutenancy of the kingdom of Aragon on June 15, 1408, a position he accepted on September 22. After the death of royal heir Martin the Younger on July 25, 1409, James is named Governor General of the Crown of Aragon on August 5 of that year, since he used to hold the royal firstborn. introduced armed troops, among which stood out the contingent of Antón de Luna, and confronted the governor of Aragón Gil Ruiz de Lihorí, the Justicia Mayor of said kingdom Juan Jiménez Cerdán and the archbishop García Fernández de Heredia. The king He died without leaving a successor named. These events led to the Concord of Alcañiz and the Compromise of Caspe, a meeting of representatives of the Crown of Aragon to elect the new king.

The result installed the candidate Ferdinand I on the throne. Although James believed that his rights were preeminent, once it had been established that the transmission of the royal succession was legitimate through the female route, the issue was simplified by comparing the degree of consanguinity of the suitors with Martin I of Aragon. According to this, Fernando de Antequera had a relationship of the third degree, Luis of Anjou of the fourth and James II of the fifth. Furthermore, Count of Urgell had not known how to manage the political opportunities that King Martín had provided him. The assassination of the archbishop of Zaragoza by supporters of Antón de Luna, with the idea of dissolving the opposition, caused him to lose many followers In any case, he did not have the support of the Catalan nobility, but only a part of it during the entire period of the Interregnum. The aspirations of James II of Urgell, who had allies in the high nobility of Aragon (such as the Luna) and of Valencia (such as the Vilaragut), should not be focused on Catalonia. The scenes of his revolt were northern Aragón (traditional fiefdom of Antón de Luna), Balaguer in the county of Urgell (belonging to his solar house) and Buñol in Valencia, a manor of his. Finally, Fernando de Antequera was elected by the committees of Caspe and proclaimed king of Aragon on June 28, 1412.

== The preparation ==
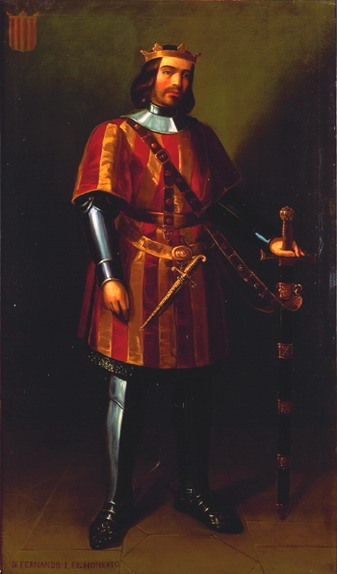
Imaginary portrait of Ferdinand I of Aragon

Ferdinand I and his advisors had a favorable deal with James II of Urgell that took the form of territorial and economic concessions for him, his wife Isabellla and his mother Margarita de Montferrat. However, the instigation of some faithful counselors and nobles, such as the Aragonese Antón de Luna, encouraged him to revolt in May 1413 against the king with the support of mercenarys English and Gascones, who fought in the Hundred Years' War, while the Cortes of 1413, according to his account in his Anales (1562-1580) Jerónimo Zurita with the support of Tomás de Clarencia, son of the king of England, who offered a thousand knights and three thousand archers, in exchange for the Kingdom of Sicily, which would be guaranteed with the wedding with one of the sisters by James of Urgell.

Revolting in the interior of the country while the notables of the entire principality, presided over by the monarch, had gathered in Barcelona turned out to be a mistake. The deputies, frightened by the news of a revolt in the countryside and unwilling to return to a situation of political uncertainty that had already lasted two years, ran to close ranks with what, despite everything, was the new king recognized by everyone. Fernando, with more political skill, had obtained support from notables and the Cortes. He also obtained the endorsement of the Kingdom of Castile and the Kingdom of France, although during the Interregnum the latter had always supported Louis of Anjou, grandson of John I of Aragon and Violant of Bar, and son of Louis II, duke of the Angevin dynasty.

Furthermore, James II of Urgell did not have the support he expected in Catalonia, and he did have great opposition. The cities and towns of the Principality did not support him, and the supporters he had in the ecclesiastical establishment were few; Among the nobility, there were not many followers of him (and they did not even deploy all the force they were capable of in his favor), in addition to the fact that he attracted the rejection of many of the Catalan nobles. He also failed to get the Generality to grant him its trust, nor to reject the ruling of Caspe, unanimously accepted by all the elites of the Crown of Aragon. Only his vassals and his strongest supporters fought for his claims, such as Antón de Luna, who had executed the plan to kill the archbishop of Zaragoza.

== The revolt ==
Upon hearing the news of the proclamation of Fernando de Antequera as king of Aragon, James II of Urgell was incredulous, and took refuge in his castle of Balaguer without wanting to go to the Cortes of Aragón that were going to meet in Zaragoza starting on August 25, 1412 in order for the king to swear the Fueros of Aragon before the Cortes of the kingdom with witnesses representing the entire Crown (the archbishop of Cagliari, the Count of Cardona—prominent Urgellist before the proclamation of the new king—or Ramón Fivaller) despite the fact that the former had been invited to this solemn meeting.

In these Cortes, reciprocally, all those present had to pay homage of fidelity to the king, in addition to doing so with the heir Alfonso, future king Magnanimo; With his attitude, the Count of Urgell avoided swearing vassalage to the monarch. Despite everything, Fernando I offered him financial compensation of 150,000 golden florins for expenses incurred in defending his aspirations to the throne, in addition to the county of Montblanch and income. for him, his wife and his mother, plus forgiveness for his supporters except for those who had been convicted of the murder of the archbishop of Zaragoza.

A few months later, James of Urgell undertook armed rebellion against the king. At that point in Fernando's reign, when it had already been accepted by almost everyone, this decision is described by Vicens Vives as a sterile revolt and by Santiago y Sobrequés as "fora de temps", since Ferdinand I represented constitutionality, order and public peace and the Count of Urgell altered all this with his rebellion. Pope Benedict XIII, with extensive influence in the region, even gave it the title of crusade to the war against James II.

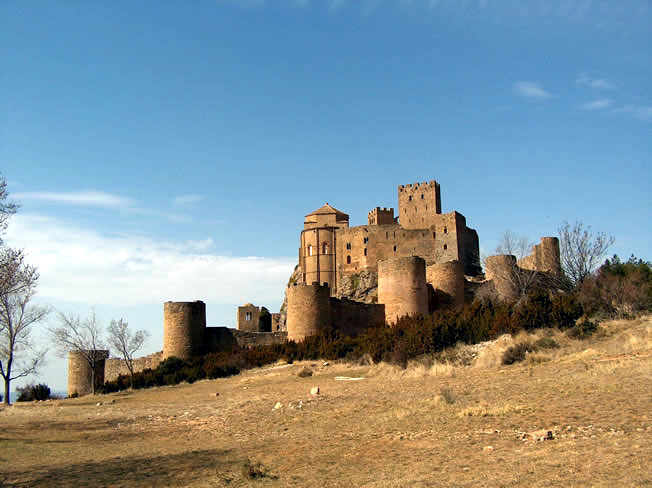
Castle of Loarre

In May 1413, Antón de Luna began operations, taking by surprise the castles of Trasmoz and Montearagón. He had the Loarre castle, from where five hundred knights and some companies of mercenary archers from Basil of Genoa and Menaut de Favars recruited among the Gascon troops that supported the interests in this region of the king of England, they carried out isolated military episodes north of Huesca.

According to Jerónimo Zurita (1580) some of the Gascon mercenaries who joined the Count of Luna's contingent abandoned the fight due to historical circumstances and because they considered that there was no chance of victory since the death of Henry IV of England had his son Henry crowned in March 1413, so Thomas of Clarence returned to England with Menaut de Favars and his men for the coronation, and They left their troops in Bordeaux and Aix. However, Canellas López points out that military actions against the troops were mercenaries who supported the Count of Urgell in the Aragonese Pyrenees who forced the Gascons to retreat to their bases. In any case, King Ferdinand sent his troops gathered in Zaragoza against the rebel centers, recovered Montearagón and blocked Antón de Luna in his Loarre castle.

In Valencia, the Urgellistas only revolted in Buñol, which was a manor of James II, where Siege of Buñol they were besieged. The king's army, under the command of Joan Escrivà (who held the lieutenant of the governorship of the city of Valencia) and thanks to the contribution of the government of Valencia, which decided to send artillery and one hundred crossbowmen among other military resources to "reduce the rebellion to obedience", achieved the capitulation of the fortress before July 19.

On June 27, 1413, Siege of Lérida, the same day that the Catalan Cortes decreed the confiscation of all his property; and later his army was defeated on July 10, which made it impossible for him to reunite the armies of Urgell and Aragón in Alcolea de Cinca, and the forces of the Kingdom of Valencia after the previous year's defeat at the Battle of Morvedre.

The count had to retreat to Balaguer awaiting English intervention, to which King Ferdinand responded by leaving Barcelona on July 26, and organizing a siege in July 1413 with six bombards of large caliber and three trebuchets, with the support of troops from all the territories of the Crown; For example, it is known that a contingent of approximately 500 armed men and horses was sent from Valencia, under the command of Alfonso de Gandía the Younger, Bernardo de Centelles and Pero Maça de Liçana in charge of the General Deputation of the Kingdom or Generality of Valencia with the unanimity of its three estates. The siege of Balaguer ended with the surrender of the count to the king on October 31 and the entry of Ferdinand I into the stronghold on November 5, 1413. The Siege of Loarre at the end of that year, the revolt considered quelled.

== Result ==
Tried and sentenced to death for treason, commuted to life imprisonment, all of his assets were confiscated and sold off, as well as those of his family and sister Leonor de Urgell . He ordered the demolition of the Formós Castle in Balaguer, which was the county palace and symbol of the resistance. Margaret of Montferrat and some of her daughters were found guilty of raising an uprising against the king and encouraging preparations for his assassination, for which they were held in Cullera (1414–1415). James was imprisoned and thus began a long exile, which passed through the castle of Urueña (1414–1420), Mora (1420–1422), Alcázar of Madrid (1422–1424), Castro Torafe, Zamora (1424–1426), Teruel and finally in Játiva ( 1426–1433), in a more dignified seclusion at the request of Alfonso V the Magnanimous, son of Ferdinand I, where he died on 1 June 1433.

== Sources ==
- Abella, Juan. The Crown of Aragon in the center of its history. The Interregnum and the Compromise of Caspe (1410-1412). Zaragoza: Government of Aragon. ISBN 978-84-8380-295-3.
- Enrique Bague. History of Catalonia. Madrid: Cupsa. ISBN 84-390-0125-8.
- Canellas. "The establishment of the Trastámara in Aragón" (PDF). Zaragoza: Institución Fernando el Católico. ISSN 0044-5517.
- Henry John (1978). The "Compromise" of Caspe. London. ISBN 978-0-40 -401479-7.
- Xavier Hernandez (2004). Military History of Catalonia. Barcelona: Studies in the History of Spain. ISBN 978-8-42-320673-5.
- José Iglesias y Fort (1964). Pere d'Urrea and Joan II's war in Camp de Tarragona. Barcelona: Rafael Dalmau. ISBN 978-84-232-0550-9.
- José Ángel Sesma Muñoz. The Interregnum (1410-1412). Concord and political commitment in the Crown of Aragon. Zaragoza: Institución Fernando el Católico. ISBN 978-8-49-911143-8.
- Santiago Sobrequés. History of Catalonia. Madrid: Cupsa. ISBN 84-390 -0125-8.
- Josep Maria Solé i Sabaté. Catalan Encyclopèdia. Barcelona: Generalitat of Catalonia. ISBN 978-8-44-120883-4.
- Ferran Valls i Taberner. History of Catalonia. Barcelona: Selecta-Catalònia. ISBN 978-84-298-0438-6.
- Història de la Generalitat de Catalunya. Barcelona: Enciclopèdia Catalana. ISBN 84-412-0884-0.
- Xavier Hernández. Història militar de Catalunya. ISBN 84-232-0638-6.
- Juan. La Corona de Aragón en el centro de su historia. El Interregno y el Compromiso de Caspe (1410-1412). Zaragoza: Gobierno de Aragón. ISBN 978-84-8380-295-3.
