= Antón de Luna =

Antonio de Luna y de Xérica (deceased in Mequinenza, Aragón, in 1419) was an Aragonese nobleman, Lord of Almonacid, Loarre, Morés, Pola and Rueda. He was leader of the supporters of James II of Urgell in the Kingdom of Aragon after the death without sons of Martin I of Aragon.

== Family ==
He was the only son of Pedro Martínez de Luna y Saluzzo and Elfa de Xérica y Arborea (illegitimate descendant of James I of Aragón and Roger of Lauria). He had kinship with the Aragonese queen consort Maria de Luna and the anti-pope Benedict XIII.

He married Aldonza de Luna y Ximénez de Urrea. After she died, in 1409 he married Leonor Cervelló. They had one daughter, Elfa de Luna y Cervelló.

== Political life ==
In 1396 he was a member of the embassy for Martin I of Aragon when he was crowned King. Martin I knighted de Luna. During the "war of factions", he led his family's faction against the Urrea family. When Martin I died, he supported James II of Urgell in his unsuccessful candidacy to the throne.

In 1411, he and a gang of men murdered the Archbishop of Zaragoza, García Fernández de Heredia, an ally of the child candidate Louis of Anjou. This action earned him excommunication and damaged James.

Finally, in the compromise of Caspe, Ferdinand of Antequera became King. De Luna accepted the decision, but later rebelled along with the count of Urgell. The rebellion was defeated and Antón de Luna was dispossessed of his properties and arrested in Mequinenza.
