= List of 2005 box office number-one films in Austria =

This is a list of films which placed number one at the weekend box office for the year 2005.

== Number-one films ==
†	This implies the highest-grossing movie of the year.

#	Date	Film	Admissions	Notes	Ref.
1	January 2, 2005	Ocean's Twelve			
2	January 9, 2005	After the Sunset			
3	January 16, 2005	Closer			
4	January 23, 2005	Blade: Trinity			
5	January 30, 2005	Blade: Trinity			
6	February 6, 2005	Cellular			
7	February 13, 2005	Felix – Ein Hase auf Weltreise			
8	February 20, 2005	Meet the Fockers			
9	February 27, 2005	Meet the Fockers			
10	March 6, 2005	Hitch	115,000		
11	March 13, 2005	Hitch			
12	March 20, 2005	Hitch			
13	March 27, 2005	Hitch			
14	April 3, 2005	The Ring Two			
15	April 10, 2005	The Ring Two			
16	April 17, 2005	The Pacifier			
17	April 24, 2005	The Pacifier			
18	May 1, 2005	XXX: State of the Union			
19	May 8, 2005	Kingdom of Heaven	55,000		
20	May 15, 2005	Kingdom of Heaven			
21	May 22, 2005	Star Wars: Episode III – Revenge of the Sith			
22	May 29, 2005	Star Wars: Episode III – Revenge of the Sith		As of this weekend Star Wars: Episode III has already attracted over 300,000 viewers to the movies.	
23	June 5, 2005	Star Wars: Episode III – Revenge of the Sith			
24	June 12, 2005	The Hitchhiker's Guide to the Galaxy			
25	June 19, 2005	Batman Begins			
26	June 26, 2005	Batman Begins			
27	July 3, 2005	War of the Worlds	80,000		
28	July 10, 2005	War of the Worlds			
29	July 17, 2005	Madagascar †	120,000		
30	July 24, 2005	Mr. & Mrs. Smith			
31	July 31, 2005	Mr. & Mrs. Smith			
32	August 7, 2005	Madagascar †			
33	August 14, 2005	Sin City			
34	August 21, 2005	The Skeleton Key			
35	August 28, 2005	Must Love Dogs			
36	September 4, 2005	Bewitched			
37	September 11, 2005	Bewitched			
38	September 18, 2005	Bewitched			
39	September 25, 2005	The White Masai			
40	October 2, 2005	The 40-Year-Old Virgin			
41	October 9, 2005	The 40-Year-Old Virgin			
42	October 16, 2005	Wallace & Gromit: The Curse of the Were-Rabbit	30,000		
43	October 23, 2005	Flightplan			
44	October 30, 2005	The Legend of Zorro			
45	November 6, 2005	The Legend of Zorro			
46	November 13, 2005	In Her Shoes			
47	November 20, 2005	Harry Potter and the Goblet of Fire	240,000		
48	November 27, 2005	Harry Potter and the Goblet of Fire			
49	December 4, 2005	Harry Potter and the Goblet of Fire			
50	December 11, 2005	The Chronicles of Narnia: The Lion, the Witch and the Wardrobe	80,000		
51	December 18, 2005	King Kong			
52	December 25, 2005	The Chronicles of Narnia: The Lion, the Witch and the Wardrobe			

== Most successful films by box office admissions ==
Most successful films of 2005 by number of movie tickets sold in Austria.

Rank	Title	Tickets sold	Country
1.	Madagascar	792,138	United States
2.	Harry Potter and the Goblet of Fire	699,372	United Kingdom, United States
3.	Meet the Fockers	516,903	United States
4.	Mr. & Mrs. Smith	514,083	United States
5.	Star Wars: Episode III – Revenge of the Sith	491,973	United States
6.	Hitch	482,171	United States
7.	The Chronicles of Narnia: The Lion, the Witch and the Wardrobe	312,834	United Kingdom, United States
8.	War of the Worlds	283,661	United States
9.	Kingdom of Heaven	232,521	United Kingdom, Germany, United States
10.	The Pacifier	229,446	United States

== See also ==
- Cinema of Austria

Preceded by 2004	2005	Succeeded by 2006
