= Compromise of Caspe =

Aragonese parliamentary agreement on succession

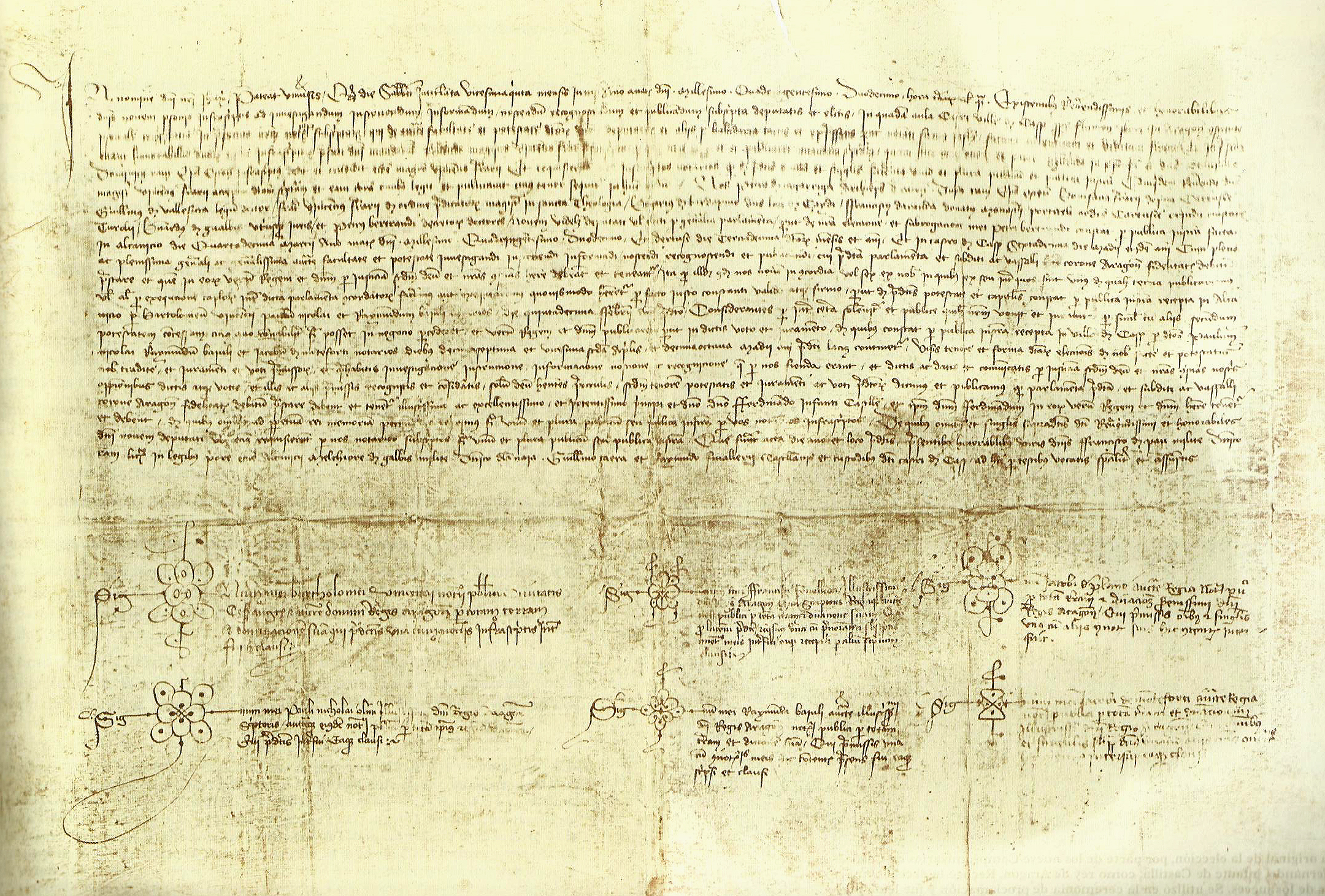
- Original deed of the compromise.
- Date: 29 March - 25 June 1412
- Location: Caspe, Aragon.
- Participants: Nine compromisaries (delegates) of the peninsular realms of the Crown of Aragon.
- Outcome: Proclamation of Ferdinand of Castile as King of Aragon.; Establishment of House of Trastámara in Aragon.; County of Urgell was dissolved and merged with the Crown.

The 1412 Compromise of Caspe (Compromiso de Caspe in Spanish, Compromís de Casp in Catalan) was an act and resolution of parliamentary representatives of the constituent realms of the Crown of Aragon (the Kingdom of Aragon, Kingdom of Valencia, and Principality of Catalonia), meeting in Caspe, to resolve the interregnum following the death of King Martin of Aragon in 1410 without a legitimate heir. Succession through the male line, as ordained in the will of James I of Aragon should have gone to James II, Count of Urgell, but multiple others claimed the throne, which led to the "conclave" and compromise.

== Background ==
The Aragonese succession laws at that time were based more on custom than any specific legislation, and even case law did not exist. However the will of an earlier king, James I of Aragon had been followed most of the time and all successions after the union of Catalonia with Aragon in 1137 had been to the eldest son, to the next younger brother, or to the only daughter. However, earlier successions indicated that agnates (males in the male line) of the Aragonese royal family had precedence over daughters and descendants of daughters; for example, Martin himself had succeeded over the daughters of his late elder brother, King John I.

However, more distant agnates had lost out to the daughter of the late king in the 11th century, when Petronilla succeeded over claims of the then agnates (second cousins or the like), the kings of Navarre.

J. N. Hillgarth writes: "Among the descendants by the male line, the closest relation to Martin was James II, Count of Urgell." T. N. Bisson writes that "the issue was (or became) political rather than simply legal, a utilitarian question of which candidate with some dynastic claim would make the best king."

== Candidates ==
The major candidates for succession were:

- James II, Count of Urgell, Martin's closest agnate as patrilineal great-grandson of Alfonso IV of Aragon. Incidentally, he was also Martin's brother-in-law. Appointed Lieutenant of the Kingdom by Martin, he was heir male of the line and claimed the throne according to agnatic primogeniture.
- Louis of Anjou, matrilineal grandson of John I of Aragon and grandnephew of Martin. He was heir general to the line and claimed the Aragonese throne according to cognatic primogeniture.
- Alfonso I, Duke of Gandia, 80-year-old patrilineal grandson of James II of Aragon. He claimed the throne by both agnatic seniority and proximity of blood to the previous kings of Aragon. He died in March 1412.
- John of Ribagorza, brother of Alfonso, who inherited his claim.
- Ferdinand of Castile, matrilineal grandson of Peter IV of Aragon and nephew of Martin, claimed the throne by proximity of blood to the last king.
- Frederic, Count of Luna, natural grandson of Martin of Aragon, being the bastard of Martin's predeceased son, Martin I of Sicily. Born illegitimate, he had been legitimized by Antipope Benedict XIII.

=== Family tree ===
James II of Aragon
Alfonso IV of Aragon | Peter IV of Ribagorza
Peter IV of Aragon | James I of Urgell | Alfonso I of Gandia | John of Ribagorza
Peter II of Urgell
John I of Aragon | Martin of Aragon | Eleanor of Aragon | Isabella of Aragon | James II of Urgell
Yolande of Aragon | Martin I of Sicily | Ferdinand of Castile
Louis of Anjou | Frederic of Luna

== Interregnum 1410–12 ==
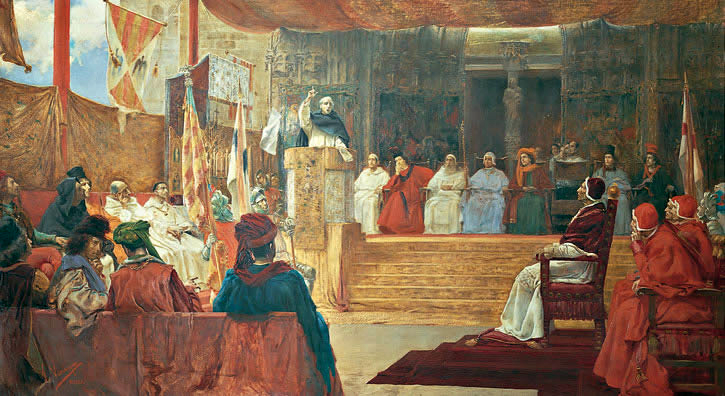
Salvador Vinegra's depiction of the deliberations

The parties had agreed to a parliamentary process to resolve the issue, but coordinating deliberations between the cortes (parliaments) of Aragon, Valencia and Catalonia was made difficult by their diverging interests. Thus, a general cortes was demanded by the governor of Catalonia to meet in Montblanc, but the meeting was delayed and ended up in Barcelona, starting in October 1410 and only being Cortes of the Principality of Catalonia. As the Cortes dragged on, the situation became violent.

Antón de Luna, an Aragonese supporter of Count James II of Urgell, assassinated the Archbishop of Zaragoza, García Fernández de Heredía (supporter of Louis of Anjou). This event damaged the candidacy of James of Urgell and gave strength to the candidacy of Ferdinand of Castile (regent of Castile and therefore commanding a nearby army with which he protected his allies). There was fighting in the streets, especially between partisans of Aragon and Valencia. The conflict divided the Kingdom of Aragon, with two rival Cortes meeting: one favorable to Ferdinand of Castile in Alcañiz, and another favorable to James II, Count of Urgell in Mequinenza (but this one was not recognized by the Catalan parliament at Tortosa). The same occurred in Valencia, with Cortes in Traiguera and Vinaròs. Furthermore, in 1410-1412 Ferdinand's troops entered Aragon and Valencia to fight the Urgellists. The Trastamarist victory at the Battle of Morvedre on 27 February 1412 finally left Valencia in their hands.

=== Conflicts and deliberations ===
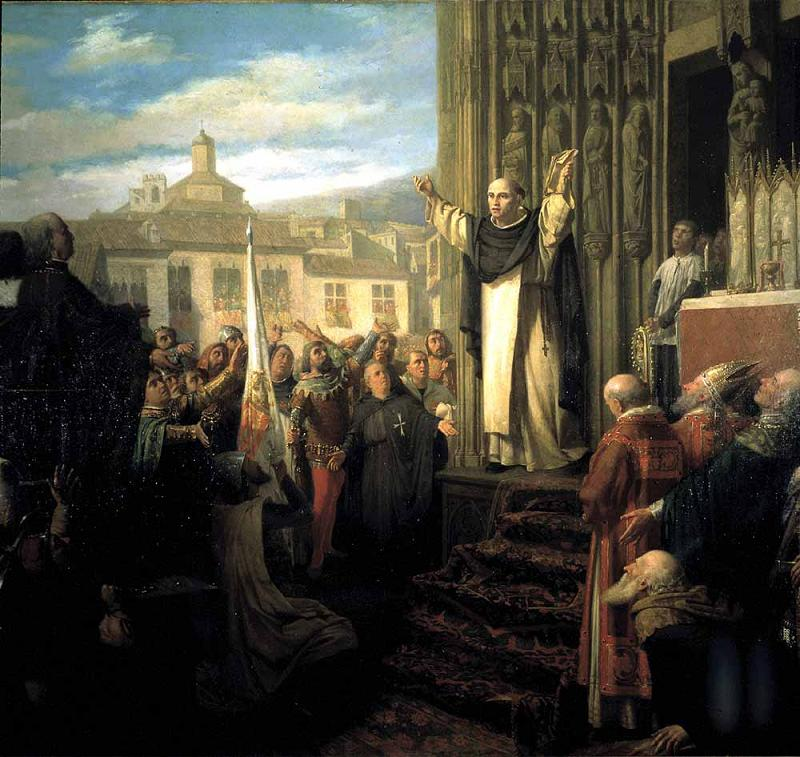
Proclamation of Ferdinand I as king of Aragon, by Dióscoro Puebla

Pope Benedict XIII (Avignon) intervened and proposed a smaller group of nine compromisarios (negotiators). The Trastamarist parliament of Alcañiz agreed with the proposition, which was finally accepted by a Catalan-Aragonese board of fourteen Aragonese Trastamarists and five varied Catalan emissaries: the agreement known as the Alcañiz Concord of 15 February 1412. But a few days later, the Alcañiz parliament chose not only the three compromisarios from Aragon but also the three Catalan and the three Valencian compromisarios too. The angry complaints among the Catalan and Valencian parliamentarians for this abuse were ignored, targeting the peaceful discussions sought since 1410; and equally the complaints of James of Urgell and Louis of Anjou.

The appointed compromisarios met in Caspe to choose the next king. The majority of historians have agreed with the account of the election by historian Jerónimo Zurita. Zurita wrote his Anales de la Corona de Aragón from the original records, which he bequeathed to the house of the General Deputation of Aragon in 1576 (they were lost or burned during political disorders in the 19th century). According to Zurita, the compromisarios had conflicting views about the succession to the deceased King Martin, and they voted differently as well. The votes were cast on Friday, 24 June 1412, and recorded on 25 June. Vincent Ferrer was the first one to speak; in a long speech, he voted for Ferdinand, and then Ram, his brother Bonifaci, Gualbes, Bardaixí, and Aranda simply joined him. Sagarriga, Vallseca, and Bertran voted differently, giving their own reasons.

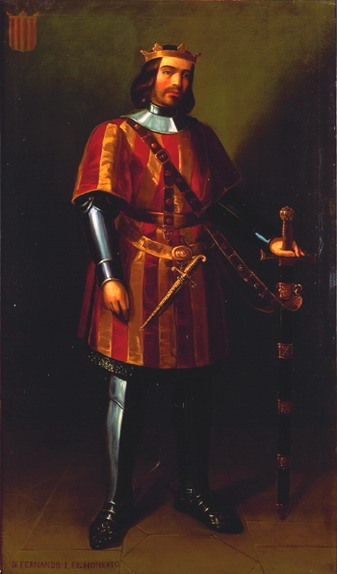
Portrait of Ferdinand of Castile, proclaimed king after the Compromise.

Kingdom of Aragon delegates:

- Domènec Ram (bishop of Huesca): voted for Ferdinand of Castile
- Francesc de Aranda (ancient royal councillor as well as envoy of Benedict XIII): voted for Ferdinand of Castile
- Berenguer de Bardaixí (jurist and official general of the Cortes of Aragon): voted for Ferdinand of Castile

Kingdom of Valencia delegates:

- Vicent Ferrer (Dominican friar, later canonized): voted for Ferdinand of Castile
- Bonifaci Ferrer (brother of Vincent and prior of the monastery of Portaceli): voted for Ferdinand of Castile
- Pere Bertran (substitute for Gener Rabassa, citizen of Valencia and legal expert): abstained

Principality of Catalonia delegates:

- Pere de Sagarriga i de Pau (archbishop of Tarragona): voted for James of Urgell and also for Alphonse of Gandia, but finally the vote have to be got by the most voted of both.
- Bernat de Gualbes (syndicus and councillor of Barcelona): voted for Ferdinand of Castile
- Guillem de Vallseca (officer general of the General Court of Catalonia): voted for James of Urgell

On 28 June 28, Ferdinand of Castile was proclaimed king by Vicent Ferrer in a public speech also recorded. The knights Guillem Ramon Alemany de Cervelló and Íñigo de Alfaro, who were present for the proclamation, brought the news of his election to Ferdinand.

==== Revisionism ====
In recent years, three Aragonese historians (José Ángel Sesma Muñoz, Carlos Laliena, and Cristina Monterde) rejected Zurita's account, arguing that no contemporary sources confirm the existence of any secret ballot. Sesma claimed in 2011 that all nine compromisarios, despite their different preferences, agreed unanimously to select Ferdinand. He repeated this view in 2012 with Laliena and Monterde. Their main argument is that the official notarized deed of proclamation, issued on 25 June 1412, does not mention any results of the supposed election. Furthermore, they quoted testimonies (but not the full statements) from those who were present at the ceremony of proclamation on 28 June, such as Melchor de Gualbes, saying that the three Catalan compromisarios had declared that "they had acted freely and had not been under any pressure" and that at the end "everybody would be of one opinion". As of 2013, there are no new published works that support this new theory.

Already in 2012, this point of view had been refuted by historian Ernest Belenguer, who called attention to the point that in this kind of election (as with papal conclaves), the results of the ballots are not published, therefore one cannot infer a unanimous election only from this kind of deed. He also mentioned that even Trastamara's official chronicler Lorenzo Valla said in the 15th century that there were very different opinions among the compromisarios. Furthermore, Belenguer cited other authors who in the 17th century had seen the same documents as Zurita, such as Uztarroz and Dormer, and reported the same account as Zurita of the preferences stated by every one of the nine compromisarios.

== Aftermath ==
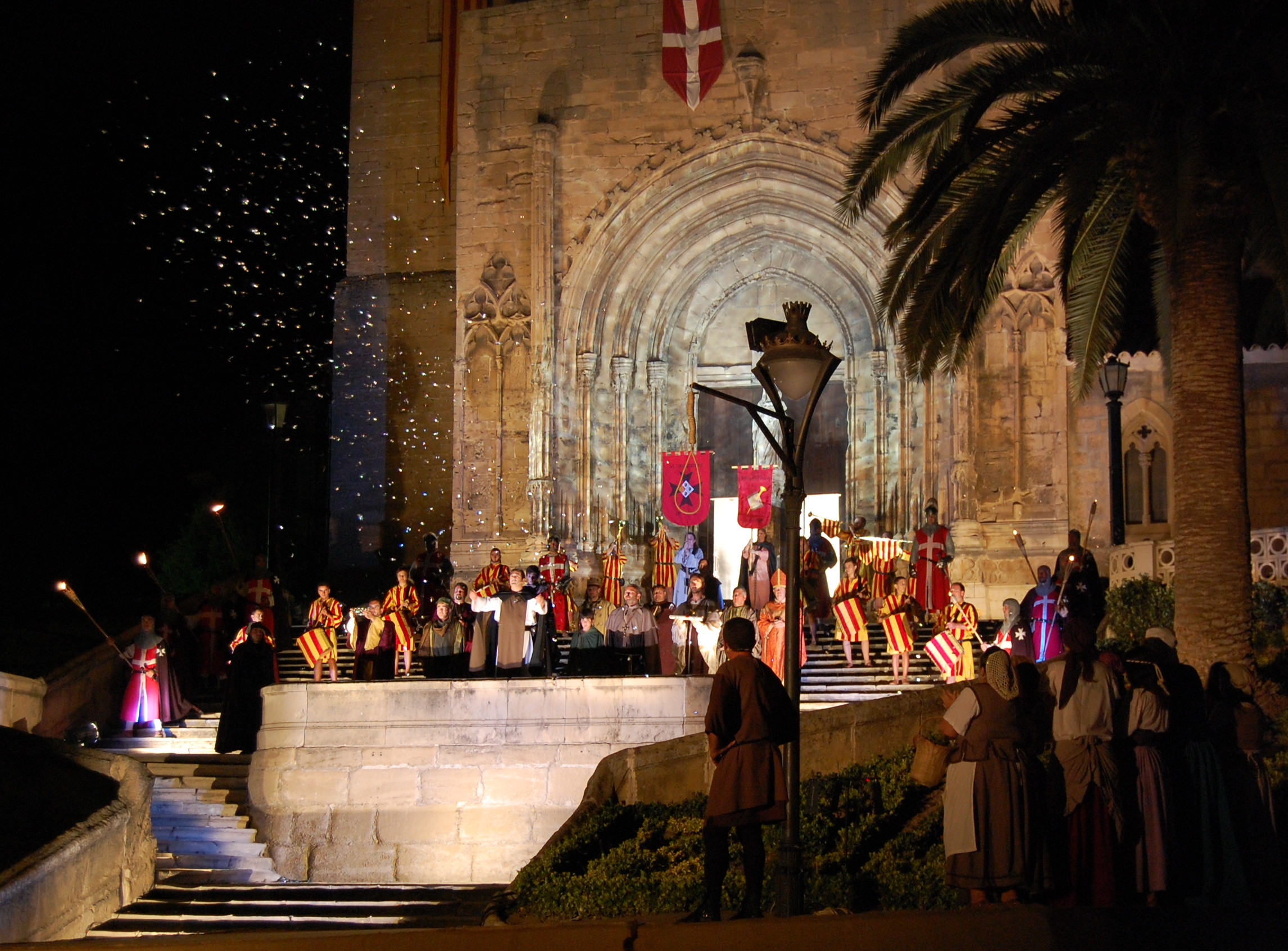
Reenactment of the Compromise

Initially James II of Urgell accepted the sentence and even swore allegiance to the new king, but he revolted in May 1413. However, he was unsuccessful to mobilize more nobles after two years of fights and battles. There were some uprisings in support of James in Valencia and Catalonia and James himself lead sorties out from his domain in Urgell. James's supporters were defeated in battle on 25 June 1413 outside of Lleida. Antón de Luna enlisted the support of Gascon and English troops who invaded at Jaca, but they were defeated on 10 July 1413 before he was able to join James's army.

In August, Ferdinand began the siege of Balaguer. Meanwhile, Antón de Luna had organized defenses in Huesca; however, the Castle of Montearagón was taken on 11 August, and he and his troops fled to Loarre Castle. Finally, in October 1413 James surrendered at his city: Balaguer. The following January, Loarre Castle fell, and the rebellion was over. The County of Urgell was dissolved in 1413 and the area came under the royal domain of the county of Barcelona, but was shared out among the Trastámara's supporters.

With the selection of a younger prince of the Castilian Royal House of Trastámara, the Aragonese Crown became increasingly drawn into the sphere of influence of the Castile. About 50 years after the Compromise, with the marriage of Ferdinand I's grandson Ferdinand II to Queen Isabella I of Castile, the Aragonese and Castilian Crowns formed a dynastic union, precursor of what would become the modern Spanish state.

== See also ==
- La fi del comte d'Urgell, a treatise in support of the dynastic line through Count James of Urgell.

== Bibliography ==
- Belenguer, Ernest (2012). El com i el perquè del Compromís de Casp (1412) (in Catalan). Barcelona: Rafael Dalmau Editions. ISBN 978-84232-0772-5.
- Bonneaud, Pierre (1999). "Le Rôle politique des ordres militaires dans la Couronne d'Aragón pendant l'interrègne de 1410 à 1412 à travers les Anales de Zurita". Aragón en la Edad Media. 14: 119–42.
- Cònsul, Arnau; Casals, Àngel (April 2012). "El Compromís de Casp. Pacte o conxorxa?" [Compromise of Caspe. Pact or plot?]. Sàpiens (in Catalan). 115. Barcelona: Grup Cultura 03: 26–37. ISSN 1695-2014.
- Dualde Serrano, Manuel (1947–1948). "La elección de los compromisarios de Caspe" [The election of the Caspe compromisarios]. Estudios de Edad Media de la Corona de Aragón (in Spanish). III. Zaragoza: 355–395.
- Dualde Serrano, Manuel; Camarena Mahiques, José (1971). El Compromiso de Caspe (in Spanish). Zaragoza: Institución Alfonso el Magnanimo and Institución Fernando el Católico.
- Giménez Fayos, Luis (1911). El Compromiso de Caspe (1412-1912) (in Spanish). Valencia: Miguel Gimeno.
- Gormedino, Luis Vela (1985). Crónica incompleta del reinado de Fernando I de Aragón (in Spanish). Zaragoza: Anubar. ISBN 84-7013-210-5.
- Laliena Corbera, Miguel; Monterde Albiac, Cristina (2012). En el sexto centenario de la Concordia de Alcañiz y del Compromiso de Caspe (in Spanish). Coordinators: Sesma Muñoz, José Ángel. Zaragoza: Gobíerno de Aragón. Archived from the original on December 12, 2012.
- Mestre i Godes, Jesús (1999). El Compromís de Casp: Un moment decisiu en la història de Catalunya (in Catalan). Barcelona: Edicions 62. ISBN 8429745130.
- Sarasa Sánchez, Esteban (1981). Aragón y el Compromiso de Caspe (in Spanish). Zaragoza: Librería General. ISBN 84-7078-107-3.
- Sesma Muñoz, José Ángel (2011). El Interregno (1410-1412) Concordia y compromiso político en la Corona de Aragón (in Spanish). Zaragoza: Institución "Fernando el Católico" (CSIC). ISBN 978-84-9911-143-8.
- Soldevila, Ferran (1994) [1965]. El Compromís de Casp (resposta al Sr. Menéndez Pidal) (in Catalan). Barcelona: Rafael Dalmau Editions. ISBN 84-232-0481-2.
- Valdeón Baruque, Julio (2001). Temas de Hoy (ed.). Los Trastámaras. El triunfo de una dinastía bastarda (in Spanish). Madrid. ISBN 84-8460-129-3.
- Zurita, Jerome (1562). Anales de la Corona de Aragón [Annals of the Crown of Aragon].
