= List of 2011 box office number-one films in Austria =

This is a list of films which placed number one at the weekend box office for the year 2011.

== Number-one films ==
†	This implies the highest-grossing movie of the year.

#	Date	Film	Ref.
1	January 9, 2011	Tangled	
2	January 16, 2011	The Green Hornet	
3	January 23, 2011	The Green Hornet	
4	January 30, 2011	Tron: Legacy	
5	February 6, 2011	Kokowääh	
6	February 13, 2011	Kokowääh	
7	February 20, 2011	No Strings Attached	
8	February 27, 2011	Just Go with It	
9	March 6, 2011	Just Go with It	
10	March 13, 2011	Rango	
11	March 20, 2011	Rango	
12	March 27, 2011	Gnomeo & Juliet	
13	April 3, 2011	Hop	
14	April 10, 2011	Rio	
15	April 17, 2011	Paul	
16	April 24, 2011	Paul	
17	May 1, 2011	Fast Five	
18	May 8, 2011	Fast Five	
19	May 15, 2011	Fast Five	
20	May 22, 2011	Pirates of the Caribbean: On Stranger Tides	
21	May 29, 2011	Pirates of the Caribbean: On Stranger Tides	
22	June 5, 2011	The Hangover Part II †	
23	June 12, 2011	The Hangover Part II †	
24	June 19, 2011	Kung Fu Panda 2	
25	June 26, 2011	Kung Fu Panda 2	
26	July 3, 2011	Transformers: Dark of the Moon	
27	July 10, 2011	Transformers: Dark of the Moon	
28	July 17, 2011	Harry Potter and the Deathly Hallows – Part 2	
29	July 24, 2011	Harry Potter and the Deathly Hallows – Part 2	
30	July 31, 2011	Cars 2	
31	August 7, 2011	The Smurfs	
32	August 14, 2011	The Smurfs	
33	August 21, 2011	The Smurfs	
34	August 28, 2011	Final Destination 5	
35	September 4, 2011	The Three Musketeers	
36	September 11, 2011	Friends with Benefits	
37	September 18, 2011	Friends with Benefits	
38	September 25, 2011	Friends with Benefits	
39	October 2, 2011	Vicky and the Treasure of the Gods	
40	October 9, 2011	Johnny English Reborn	
41	October 16, 2011	Johnny English Reborn	
42	October 23, 2011	Johnny English Reborn	
43	October 30, 2011	The Adventures of Tintin	
44	November 6, 2,020,110	Paranormal Activity 3	
45	November 13, 2011	Immortals	
46	November 20, 2011	The Lion King	
47	November 27, 2011	The Twilight Saga: Breaking Dawn – Part 1	
48	December 4, 2011	The Twilight Saga: Breaking Dawn – Part 1	
49	December 11, 2011	Puss in Boots	
50	December 18, 2011	Puss in Boots	
51	December 25, 2011	Puss in Boots	
52	January 1, 2012	Puss in Boots	

== Most successful films by box office admissions ==
Most successful films of 2011 by number of movie tickets sold in Austria.

Rank	Title	Tickets sold	Country
1.	The Hangover Part II	624,121	United States
2.	Harry Potter and the Deathly Hallows – Part 2]	611,322	United Kingdom, United States
3.	Pirates of the Caribbean: On Stranger Tides	603,200	United States
4.	The Smurfs	423,368	United States
5.	The Twilight Saga: Breaking Dawn – Part 1	417,912	United States
6.	Puss in Boots	359,896	United States
7.	Fast Five	337,605	United States
8.	Kung Fu Panda 2	325,209	United States
9.	Kokowääh	310,442	Germany
10.	Rio	298,892	United States

== See also ==
- Cinema of Austria

Preceded by 2010	2011	Succeeded by 2012
