= List of 2012 box office number-one films in Austria =

This is a list of films which placed number one at the weekend box office for the year 2012.

== Number-one films ==
†	This implies the highest-grossing movie of the year.

#	Date	Film	Notes	Ref.
1	January 8, 2012	The Intouchables		
2	January 15, 2012	The Intouchables		
3	January 22, 2012	The Intouchables		
4	January 29, 2012	The Intouchables		
5	February 5, 2012	The Intouchables		
6	February 12, 2012	The Intouchables		
7	February 19, 2012	The Intouchables		
8	February 26, 2012	The Intouchables	As of this weekend, The Intouchables surpassed the 500,000 admissions mark.	
9	March 4, 2012	This Means War		
10	March 11, 2012	John Carter		
11	March 18, 2012	Turkish for Beginners III		
12	March 25, 2012	The Hunger Games		
13	April 1, 2012	Wrath of the Titans		
14	April 8, 2012	Titanic		
15	April 15, 2012	Battleship		
16	April 22, 2012	Battleship		
17	April 29, 2012	American Reunion		
18	May 6, 2012	American Reunion		
19	May 13, 2012	American Reunion		
20	May 20, 2012	The Dictator		
21	May 27, 2012	Men in Black 3		
22	June 3, 2012	Snow White and the Huntsman		
23	June 10, 2012	Snow White and the Huntsman		
24	June 17, 2012	Snow White and the Huntsman		
25	June 24, 2012	Snow White and the Huntsman		
26	July 1, 2012	The Amazing Spider-Man		
27	July 8, 2012	Ice Age: Continental Drift †		
28	July 15, 2012	Ice Age: Continental Drift †		
29	July 22, 2012	Ice Age: Continental Drift †		
30	July 29, 2012	The Dark Knight Rises		
31	August 5, 2012	Ted		
32	August 12, 2012	Ted		
33	August 19, 2012	Ted		
34	August 26, 2012	Ted		
35	September 2, 2012	The Expendables 2		
36	September 9, 2012	The Expendables 2		
37	September 16, 2012	The Bourne Legacy		
38	September 23, 2012	Resident Evil: Retribution		
39	September 30, 2012	Hope Springs		
40	October 7, 2012	Madagascar 3: Europe's Most Wanted		
41	October 14, 2012	Madagascar 3: Europe's Most Wanted		
42	October 21, 2012	Madagascar 3: Europe's Most Wanted		
43	October 28, 2012	Madagascar 3: Europe's Most Wanted		
44	November 4, 2,020,120	Skyfall		
45	November 11, 2012	Skyfall		
46	November 18, 2012	Skyfall		
47	November 25, 2012	The Twilight Saga: Breaking Dawn – Part 2		
48	December 2, 2012	The Twilight Saga: Breaking Dawn – Part 2		
49	December 9, 2012	The Twilight Saga: Breaking Dawn – Part 2		
50	December 16, 2012	The Hobbit: An Unexpected Journey		
51	December 23, 2012	The Hobbit: An Unexpected Journey		
52	December 30, 2012	The Hobbit: An Unexpected Journey		

== Most successful films by box office admissions ==
Most successful films of 2012 by number of movie tickets sold in Austria.

Rank	Title	Tickets sold	Country
1.	Ice Age: Continental Drift	951,248	United States
2.	Skyfall	779,488	United Kingdom, United States
3.	The Intouchables	725,954	France
4.	Ted	618,101	United States
5.	The Hobbit: An Unexpected Journey	500,570	New Zealand, United States
6.	Madagascar 3: Europe's Most Wanted	493,079	United States
7.	The Twilight Saga: Breaking Dawn – Part 2	480,912	United States
8.	American Reunion	430,851	United States
9.	The Dark Knight Rises	371,147	United States, United Kingdom
10.	Men in Black 3	286,295	United States

== See also ==
- Cinema of Austria

Preceded by 2011	2012	Succeeded by 2013
