= List of 2004 box office number-one films in Austria =

This is a list of films which placed number one at the weekend box office for the year 2004.

== Number-one films ==
| † | This implies the highest-grossing movie of the year. |

| # | Date | Film | Admissions | Notes | Ref. |
|---|---|---|---|---|---|
| 1 | January 4, 2004 | The Lord of the Rings: The Return of the King | | | |
| 2 | January 11, 2004 | The Last Samurai | | | |
| 3 | January 18, 2004 | The Last Samurai | | | |
| 4 | January 25, 2004 | The Haunted Mansion | | | |
| 5 | February 1, 2004 | Mona Lisa Smile | | | |
| 6 | February 8, 2004 | School of Rock | | | |
| 7 | February 15, 2004 | Something's Gotta Give | | | |
| 8 | February 22, 2004 | Something's Gotta Give | | | |
| 9 | February 29, 2004 | Scary Movie 3 | > 100,000 | | |
| 10 | March 7, 2004 | Along Came Polly | | | |
| 11 | March 14, 2004 | Along Came Polly | | | |
| 12 | March 21, 2004 | Brother Bear | | | |
| 13 | March 28, 2004 | Brother Bear | | | |
| 14 | April 4, 2004 | Brother Bear | | | |
| 15 | April 11, 2004 | Brother Bear | | | |
| 16 | April 18, 2004 | Dawn of the Dead | | More than 400,000 moviegoers have seen Brother Bear. | |
| 17 | April 25, 2004 | 50 First Dates | | | |
| 18 | May 2, 2004 | 50 First Dates | | | |
| 19 | May 9, 2004 | Van Helsing | 100,000 | | |
| 20 | May 16, 2004 | Troy | 130,000 | | |
| 21 | May 23, 2004 | Troy | | | |
| 22 | May 30, 2004 | The Day After Tomorrow | > 100,000 | | |
| 23 | June 6, 2004 | Harry Potter and the Prisoner of Azkaban | 200,000 | | |
| 24 | June 13, 2004 | Harry Potter and the Prisoner of Azkaban | | | |
| 25 | June 20, 2004 | Harry Potter and the Prisoner of Azkaban | | | |
| 26 | June 27, 2004 | Harry Potter and the Prisoner of Azkaban | | | |
| 27 | July 4, 2004 | Shrek 2 | 120,000 | | |
| 28 | July 11, 2004 | Spider-Man 2 | 130,000 | | |
| 29 | July 18, 2004 | Spider-Man 2 | | | |
| 30 | July 25, 2004 | Traumschiff Surprise – Periode 1 † | 280,000 | | |
| 31 | August 1, 2004 | Traumschiff Surprise – Periode 1 † | | | |
| 32 | August 8, 2004 | I, Robot | | | |
| 33 | August 15, 2004 | Traumschiff Surprise – Periode 1 † | | Admissions for Traumschiff Surprise – Periode 1 tops 1,000,000. | |
| 34 | August 22, 2004 | Garfield: The Movie | | | |
| 35 | August 29, 2004 | Garfield: The Movie | | | |
| 36 | September 5, 2004 | The Chronicles of Riddick | | | |
| 37 | September 12, 2004 | The Village | | | |
| 38 | September 19, 2004 | The Village | | | |
| 39 | September 26, 2004 | Silentium | | | |
| 40 | October 3, 2004 | DodgeBall: A True Underdog Story | | | |
| 41 | October 10, 2004 | The Terminal | | | |
| 42 | October 17, 2004 | Shark Tale | | | |
| 43 | October 24, 2004 | The Bourne Supremacy | | | |
| 44 | October 31, 2004 | 7 Dwarves – Men Alone in the Wood | | | |
| 45 | November 7, 2004 | 7 Dwarves – Men Alone in the Wood | | | |
| 46 | November 14, 2004 | 7 Dwarves – Men Alone in the Wood | | | |
| 47 | November 21, 2004 | 7 Dwarves – Men Alone in the Wood | | 7 Dwarves – Men Alone in the Wood has drawn over 500,000 viewers to the movies. | |
| 48 | November 28, 2004 | National Treasure | | | |
| 49 | December 5, 2004 | Bridget Jones: The Edge of Reason | | | |
| 50 | December 12, 2004 | The Incredibles | | | |
| 51 | December 19, 2004 | Ocean's Twelve | | | |
| 52 | December 26, 2004 | The Incredibles | | | |
| 53 | January 2, 2004 | Ocean's Twelve | | | |

== Most successful films by box office admissions ==
Most successful films of 2004 by number of movie tickets sold in Austria.

| Rank | Title | Tickets sold | Country |
|---|---|---|---|
| 1. | Traumschiff Surprise – Periode 1 | 1,173,846 | Germany |
| 2. | Harry Potter and the Prisoner of Azkaban | 662,138 | United States, United Kingdom |
| 3. | Shrek 2 | 652,029 | United States |
| 4. | 7 Dwarves – Men Alone in the Wood | 592,330 | Germany |
| 5. | Troy | 554,953 | United States, United Kingdom, Malta |
| 6. | Something's Gotta Give | 494,296 | United States |
| 7. | Brother Bear | 480,633 | United States |
| 8. | The Day After Tomorrow | 444,968 | United States |
| 9. | Spider-Man 2 | 381,755 | United States |
| 10. | The Incredibles | 365,551 | United States |

== See also ==
- Cinema of Austria

| Preceded by 2003 | 2004 | Succeeded by 2005 |
