= List of 2009 box office number-one films in Austria =

This is a list of films which placed number one at the weekend box office for the year 2009.

== Number-one films ==
†	This implies the highest-grossing movie of the year.

#	Date	Film	Ref.
1	4 January 2009	Echte Wiener - Die Sackbauer Saga	
2	11 January 2009	Transporter 3	
3	18 January 2009	Twilight	
4	25 January 2009	Bolt	
5	1 February 2009	The Curious Case of Benjamin Button	
6	8 February 2009	The Curious Case of Benjamin Button	
7	15 February 2009	He's Just Not That Into You	
8	22 February 2009	Yes Man	
9	1 March 2009	Yes Man	
10	8 March 2009	Marley & Me	
11	15 March 2009	The Bone Man	
12	22 March 2009	Slumdog Millionaire	
13	29 March 2009	Paul Blart: Mall Cop	
14	5 April 2009	Fast & Furious	
15	12 April 2009	Fast & Furious	
16	19 April 2009	Crank: High Voltage	
17	26 April 2009	Crank: High Voltage	
18	3 May 2009	X-Men Origins: Wolverine	
19	10 May 2009	Star Trek	
20	17 May 2009	Angels & Demons	
21	24 May 2009	Angels & Demons	
22	31 May 2009	Angels & Demons	
23	7 June 2009	Terminator Salvation	
24	14 June 2009	Terminator Salvation	
25	21 June 2009	Night at the Museum: Battle of the Smithsonian	
26	28 June 2009	Transformers: Revenge of the Fallen	
27	5 July 2009	Ice Age: Dawn of the Dinosaurs †	
28	12 July 2009	Ice Age: Dawn of the Dinosaurs †	
29	19 July 2009	Harry Potter and the Half-Blood Prince	
30	26 July 2009	Harry Potter and the Half-Blood Prince	
31	2 August 2009	The Proposal	
32	9 August 2009	The Hangover	
33	16 August 2009	The Hangover	
34	23 August 2009	Inglourious Basterds	
35	30 August 2009	Inglourious Basterds	
36	6 September 2009	The Final Destination	
37	13 September 2009	Vicky the Viking	
38	20 September 2009	Vicky the Viking	
39	27 September 2009	Vicky the Viking	
40	4 October 2009	The Ugly Truth	
41	11 October 2009	Vicky the Viking	
42	18 October 2009	G-Force	
43	25 October 2009	G-Force	
44	1 November 2009	Michael Jackson's This Is It	
45	8 November 2009	Couples Retreat	
46	15 November 2009	2012	
47	22 November 2009	2012	
48	29 November 2009	The Twilight Saga: New Moon	
49	6 December 2009	Rabbit Without Ears 2	
50	13 December 2009	The Princess and the Frog	
51	20 December 2009	Avatar	
52	27 December 2009	Avatar	

== Most successful films by box office admissions ==
Most successful films of 2009 by number of movie tickets sold in Austria.

Rank	Title	Tickets sold	Country
1.	Ice Age: Dawn of the Dinosaurs	1,272,648	United Kingdom, Germany, United States
2.	Vicky the Viking	796,094	United States
3.	Harry Potter and the Half-Blood Prince	556,145	United Kingdom, United States
4.	Angels & Demons	509,649	United States
5.	The Hangover	441,699	United States
6.	Inglourious Basterds	389,306	United States, United Kingdom
7.	Avatar	375,101	United States
8.	2012	360,181	United States
9.	The Twilight Saga: New Moon	344,499	United States
10.	The Proposal	333,165	United States

== See also ==
- Cinema of Austria

Preceded by 2008	2009	Succeeded by 2010
