= List of 2010 box office number-one films in Austria =

This is a list of films which placed number one at the weekend box office for the year 2010.

== Number-one films ==
†	This implies the highest-grossing movie of the year.

#	Date	Film	Ref.
1	January 3, 2010	Avatar †	
2	January 10, 2010	Avatar †	
3	January 17, 2010	Avatar †	
4	January 24, 2010	Avatar †	
5	January 31, 2010	Sherlock Holmes	
6	February 7, 2010	Avatar †	
7	February 14, 2010	Valentine's Day	
8	February 21, 2010	Valentine's Day	
9	February 28, 2010	Shutter Island	
10	March 7, 2010	Alice in Wonderland	
11	March 14, 2010	Alice in Wonderland	
12	March 21, 2010	Alice in Wonderland	
13	March 28, 2010	How to Train Your Dragon	
14	April 4, 2010	The Bounty Hunter	
15	April 11, 2010	Clash of the Titans	
16	April 18, 2010	Clash of the Titans	
17	April 25, 2010	Clash of the Titans	
18	May 2, 2010	She's Out of My League	
19	May 9, 2010	Iron Man 2	
20	May 16, 2010	Robin Hood	
21	May 23, 2010	Prince of Persia: The Sands of Time	
22	May 30, 2010	Sex and the City 2	
23	June 6, 2010	Sex and the City 2	
24	June 13, 2010	Sex and the City 2	
25	June 20, 2010	Hanni & Nanni	
26	June 27, 2010	Hanni & Nanni	
27	July 4, 2010	Shrek Forever After	
28	July 11, 2010	Shrek Forever After	
29	July 18, 2010	The Twilight Saga: Eclipse	
30	July 25, 2010	Knight and Day	
31	August 1, 2010	Inception	
32	August 8, 2010	Grown Ups	
33	August 15, 2010	Grown Ups	
34	August 22, 2010	The Last Airbender	
35	August 29, 2010	The Expendables	
36	September 5, 2010	The Sorcerer's Apprentice	
37	September 12, 2010	Vampires Suck	
38	September 19, 2010	Resident Evil: Afterlife	
39	September 26, 2010	Eat Pray Love	
40	October 3, 2010	Despicable Me	
41	October 10, 2010	Despicable Me	
42	October 17, 2010	Despicable Me	
43	October 24, 2010	Life as We Know It	
44	October 31, 2010	Jackass 3D	
45	November 7, 2010	Due Date	
46	November 14, 2010	Due Date	
47	November 21, 2010	Harry Potter and the Deathly Hallows – Part 1	
48	November 28, 2010	Harry Potter and the Deathly Hallows – Part 1	
49	December 5, 2010	Harry Potter and the Deathly Hallows – Part 1	
50	December 12, 2010	Tangled	
51	December 19, 2010	Tangled	
52	December 26, 2010	Tangled	
53	January 2, 2011	Little Fockers	

== Most successful films by box office admissions ==
Most successful films of 2010 by number of movie tickets sold in Austria.

Rank	Title	Tickets sold	Country
1.	Avatar	799,639	United States
2.	Alice in Wonderland	526,814	United States
3.	Harry Potter and the Deathly Hallows – Part 1	496,190	United Kingdom, United States
4.	Shrek Forever After	445,754	United States
5.	The Twilight Saga: Eclipse	400,032	United States
6.	Grown Ups	364,582	United States
7.	Inception	322,890	United States, United Kingdom
8.	Tangled	321,912	United States
9.	Sex and the City 2	302,083	United States
10.	It's Complicated	292,228	United States

== See also ==
- Cinema of Austria

Preceded by 2009	2010	Succeeded by 2011
