= List of 2013 box office number-one films in Austria =

This is a list of films which placed number one at the weekend box office for the year 2013.

== Number-one films ==
†	This implies the highest-grossing movie of the year.

#	Date	Film	Ref.
1	January 6, 2013	The Hobbit: An Unexpected Journey	
2	January 13, 2013	Break Up Man III	
3	January 20, 2013	Django Unchained †	
4	January 27, 2013	Django Unchained †	
5	February 3, 2013	Django Unchained †	
6	February 10, 2013	Kokowääh 2	
7	February 17, 2013	A Good Day to Die Hard	
8	February 24, 2013	A Good Day to Die Hard	
9	March 3, 2013	Hansel & Gretel: Witch Hunters	
10	March 10, 2013	Hansel & Gretel: Witch Hunters	
11	March 17, 2013	Hansel & Gretel: Witch Hunters	
12	March 24, 2013	The Croods	
13	March 31, 2013	G.I. Joe: Retaliation	
14	April 7, 2013	The Croods	
15	April 14, 2013	Oblivion	
16	April 21, 2013	Mama	
17	April 28, 2013	Scary Movie 5	
18	May 5, 2013	Iron Man 3	
19	May 12, 2013	Iron Man 3	
20	May 19, 2013	The Great Gatsby	
21	May 26, 2013	Fast & Furious 6	
22	June 2, 2013	The Hangover Part III	
23	June 9, 2013	The Hangover Part III	
24	June 16, 2013	The Hangover Part III	
25	June 23, 2013	Monsters University	
26	June 30, 2013	World War Z	
27	July 7, 2013	Despicable Me 2	
28	July 14, 2013	Despicable Me 2	
29	July 21, 2013	Grown Ups 2	
30	July 28, 2013	The Wolverine	
31	August 4, 2013	The Smurfs 2	
32	August 11, 2013	The Smurfs 2	
33	August 18, 2013	Elysium	
34	August 25, 2013	The Smurfs 2	
35	September 1, 2013	We're the Millers	
36	September 8, 2013	We're the Millers	
37	September 15, 2013	We're the Millers	
38	September 22, 2013	We're the Millers	
39	September 29, 2013	The Internship	
40	October 6, 2013	Rush	
41	October 13, 2013	Rush	
42	October 20, 2013	Rush	
43	October 27, 2013	Jackass Presents: Bad Grandpa	
44	November 3, 2013	Thor: The Dark World	
45	November 10, 2013	Fack ju Göhte	
46	November 17, 2013	Fack ju Göhte	
47	November 24, 2013	The Hunger Games: Catching Fire	
48	December 1, 2013	The Hunger Games: Catching Fire	
49	December 8, 2013	Frozen	
50	December 15, 2013	The Hobbit: The Desolation of Smaug	
51	December 22, 2013	The Hobbit: The Desolation of Smaug	
52	December 29, 2013	The Hobbit: The Desolation of Smaug	

== Most successful films by box office admissions ==
Most successful films of 2013 by number of movie tickets sold in Austria.

Rank	Title	Tickets sold	Country
1.	Django Unchained	549,992	United States
2.	The Hobbit: The Desolation of Smaug	485,154	New Zealand, United States
3.	The Hangover Part III	484,638	United States
4.	Despicable Me 2	424,527	United States
5.	Fast & Furious 6	393,771	United States
6.	Rush	391,469	United Kingdom, Germany, United States
7.	Frozen	383,333	United States
8.	Fack ju Göhte	354,675	Germany
9.	The Hunger Games: Catching Fire	354,658	United States
10.	The Smurfs 2	347,614	United States

== See also ==
- Cinema of Austria

Preceded by 2012	2013	Succeeded by 2014
