= List of 2003 box office number-one films in Austria =

This is a list of films which placed number one at the weekend box office for the year 2003.

== Number-one films ==
†	This implies the highest-grossing movie of the year.

#	Date	Film	Admissions	Notes	Ref.
16	April 20, 2003	Johnny English			
17	April 27, 2003	Johnny English			
18	May 4, 2003	X2			
19	May 11, 2003	Anger Management			
20	May 18, 2003	Anger Management			
21	May 25, 2003	The Matrix Reloaded	230,000		
22	June 1, 2003	The Matrix Reloaded			
23	June 8, 2003	The Matrix Reloaded			
24	June 15, 2003	Bruce Almighty			
25	June 22, 2003	2 Fast 2 Furious			
26	June 29, 2003	2 Fast 2 Furious			
27	July 6, 2003	Hulk			
28	July 13, 2003	Charlie's Angels: Full Throttle			
29	July 20, 2003	Charlie's Angels: Full Throttle			
30	July 27, 2003	Legally Blonde 2: Red, White & Blonde			
31	August 3, 2003	Terminator 3: Rise of the Machines			
32	August 10, 2003	Terminator 3: Rise of the Machines			
33	August 17, 2003	Lara Croft: Tomb Raider – The Cradle of Life			
34	August 24, 2003	American Wedding	85,000		
35	August 31, 2003	American Wedding	80,000		
36	September 7, 2003	Pirates of the Caribbean: The Curse of the Black Pearl	> 100,000		
37	September 14, 2003	Pirates of the Caribbean: The Curse of the Black Pearl			
38	September 21, 2003	Pirates of the Caribbean: The Curse of the Black Pearl			
39	September 28, 2003	Pirates of the Caribbean: The Curse of the Black Pearl			
40	October 5, 2003	The League of Extraordinary Gentlemen		Pirates of the Caribbean: The Curse of the Black Pearl's total reaches almost 600,000.	
41	October 12, 2003	Bad Boys II	90,000		
42	October 19, 2003	Bad Boys II			
43	October 26, 2003	Intolerable Cruelty			
44	November 2, 2003	Intolerable Cruelty			
45	November 9, 2003	The Matrix Revolutions	> 100,000		
46	November 16, 2003	The Matrix Revolutions			
47	November 23, 2003	Finding Nemo	> 200,000	Love Actually enters at #2 with 30,000 tickets sold.	
48	November 30, 2003	Finding Nemo			
49	December 7, 2003	Finding Nemo			
50	December 14, 2003	Finding Nemo			
51	December 21, 2003	The Lord of the Rings: The Return of the King †	> 200,000		
52	December 28, 2003	The Lord of the Rings: The Return of the King †		Almost 1,000,000 have seen Finding Nemo.	

== See also ==
- Cinema of Austria

Preceded by 2002	2003	Succeeded by 2004
