= List of 2006 box office number-one films in Austria =

This is a list of films which placed number one at the weekend box office for the year 2006.

== Number-one films ==
| † | This implies the highest-grossing movie of the year. |

| # | Date | Film | Admissions | Notes | Ref. |
|---|---|---|---|---|---|
| 1 | January 1, 2006 | Rumor Has It | | | |
| 2 | January 8, 2006 | Fun with Dick and Jane | | | |
| 3 | January 15, 2006 | Fun with Dick and Jane | | | |
| 4 | January 22, 2006 | Prime | | | |
| 5 | January 29, 2006 | Chicken Little | | | |
| 6 | February 5, 2006 | Chicken Little | | | |
| 7 | February 12, 2006 | Saw II | | | |
| 8 | February 19, 2006 | Saw II | | | |
| 9 | February 26, 2006 | Cheaper by the Dozen 2 | | | |
| 10 | March 5, 2006 | Underworld: Evolution | | | |
| 11 | March 12, 2006 | The Pink Panther | | | |
| 12 | March 19, 2006 | Failure to Launch | | | |
| 13 | March 26, 2006 | Inside Man | | | |
| 14 | April 2, 2006 | The Wild Soccer Bunch 3 | | | |
| 15 | April 9, 2006 | Ice Age: The Meltdown † | 280,000 | | |
| 16 | April 16, 2006 | Ice Age: The Meltdown † | | | |
| 17 | April 23, 2006 | Ice Age: The Meltdown † | | | |
| 18 | April 30, 2006 | Ice Age: The Meltdown † | | Ice Age: The Meltdown surpassed the 1,000,000 mark. | |
| 19 | May 7, 2006 | Mission: Impossible III | | | |
| 20 | May 14, 2006 | Mission: Impossible III | | | |
| 21 | May 21, 2006 | The Da Vinci Code | 170,000 | | |
| 22 | May 28, 2006 | The Da Vinci Code | | | |
| 23 | June 4, 2006 | The Da Vinci Code | | | |
| 24 | June 11, 2006 | The Da Vinci Code | | | |
| 25 | June 18, 2006 | The Da Vinci Code | | | |
| 26 | June 25, 2006 | The Shaggy Dog | | | |
| 27 | July 2, 2006 | The Shaggy Dog | | | |
| 28 | July 9, 2006 | Over the Hedge | | | |
| 29 | July 16, 2006 | The Fast and the Furious: Tokyo Drift | | | |
| 30 | July 23, 2006 | The Fast and the Furious: Tokyo Drift | | | |
| 31 | July 30, 2006 | Pirates of the Caribbean: Dead Man's Chest | | | |
| 32 | August 6, 2006 | Pirates of the Caribbean: Dead Man's Chest | | | |
| 33 | August 13, 2006 | Pirates of the Caribbean: Dead Man's Chest | | | |
| 34 | August 20, 2006 | Superman Returns | | | |
| 35 | August 27, 2006 | Miami Vice | | | |
| 36 | September 3, 2006 | Miami Vice | | | |
| 37 | September 10, 2006 | Cars | 76,000 | | |
| 38 | September 17, 2006 | Perfume: The Story of a Murderer | 120,000 | | |
| 39 | September 24, 2006 | Perfume: The Story of a Murderer | | | |
| 40 | October 1, 2006 | Perfume: The Story of a Murderer | | | |
| 41 | October 8, 2006 | Perfume: The Story of a Murderer | | | |
| 42 | October 15, 2006 | The Devil Wears Prada | | | |
| 43 | October 22, 2006 | The Devil Wears Prada | | | |
| 44 | October 29, 2006 | 7 Zwerge – Der Wald ist nicht genug | 110,000 | | |
| 45 | November 5, 2006 | 7 Zwerge – Der Wald ist nicht genug | | | |
| 46 | November 12, 2006 | 7 Zwerge – Der Wald ist nicht genug | | | |
| 47 | November 19, 2006 | Open Season | | | |
| 48 | November 26, 2006 | Casino Royale | 140,000 | | |
| 49 | December 3, 2006 | Casino Royale | | After two weeks Casino Royale has been seen at least 300,000 times. | |
| 50 | December 10, 2006 | Casino Royale | | | |
| 51 | December 17, 2006 | Eragon | | | |
| 52 | December 24, 2006 | Eragon | | | |
| 53 | December 31, 2006 | Night at the Museum | | | |

== Most successful films by box office admissions ==
Most successful films of 2006 by number of movie tickets sold in Austria.

| Rank | Title | Tickets sold | Country |
|---|---|---|---|
| 1. | Ice Age: The Meltdown | 1,197,007 | United States |
| 2. | Pirates of the Caribbean: Dead Man's Chest | 882,087 | United States |
| 3. | The Da Vinci Code | 739,337 | United States |
| 4. | Perfume: The Story of a Murderer | 598,884 | Germany, France, Spain |
| 5. | Casino Royale | 527,667 | United Kingdom, United States, Czech Republic, Germany |
| 6. | 7 Zwerge – Der Wald ist nicht genug | 460,671 | Germany |
| 7. | Over the Hedge | 418,874 | United States |
| 8. | The Devil Wears Prada | 406,912 | United States |
| 9. | Cars | 396,010 | United States |
| 10. | Chicken Little | 321,289 | United States |

== See also ==
- Cinema of Austria

| Preceded by 2005 | 2006 | Succeeded by 2007 |
