= List of 2008 box office number-one films in Austria =

This is a list of films which placed number one at the weekend box office for the year 2008.

== Number-one films ==
†	This implies the highest-grossing movie of the year.

#	Date	Film	Ref.
1	January 6, 2008	Rabbit Without Ears	
2	January 13, 2008	I Am Legend	
3	January 20, 2008	I Am Legend	
4	January 27, 2008	National Treasure: Book of Secrets	
5	February 3, 2008	Asterix at the Olympic Games	
6	February 10, 2008	Saw IV	
7	February 17, 2008	Rambo	
8	February 24, 2008	The Wild Soccer Bunch 5	
9	March 2, 2008	Meet the Spartans	
10	March 9, 2008	10,000 BC	
11	March 16, 2008	Horton Hears a Who!	
12	March 23, 2008	Horton Hears a Who!	
13	March 30, 2008	Jumper	
14	April 6, 2008	The Game Plan	
15	April 13, 2008	The Game Plan	
16	April 20, 2008	Sommer	
17	April 27, 2008	Fool's Gold	
18	May 4, 2008	Iron Man	
19	May 11, 2008	What Happens in Vegas	
20	May 18, 2008	What Happens in Vegas	
21	May 25, 2008	Indiana Jones and the Kingdom of the Crystal Skull	
22	June 1, 2008	Sex and the City	
23	June 8, 2008	Sex and the City	
24	June 15, 2008	Sex and the City	
25	June 22, 2008	Forgetting Sarah Marshall	
26	June 29, 2008	Forgetting Sarah Marshall	
27	July 6, 2008	Hancock	
28	July 13, 2008	Hancock	
29	July 20, 2008	Mamma Mia! †	
30	July 27, 2008	Mamma Mia! †	
31	August 3, 2008	Mamma Mia! †	
32	August 10, 2008	The Mummy: Tomb of the Dragon Emperor	
33	August 17, 2008	You Don't Mess with the Zohan	
34	August 24, 2008	The Dark Knight	
35	August 31, 2008	The Dark Knight	
36	September 7, 2008	Wanted	
37	September 14, 2008	Wanted	
38	September 21, 2008	Tropic Thunder	
39	September 28, 2008	Wall-E	
40	October 5, 2008	Wall-E	
41	October 12, 2008	Wall-E	
42	October 19, 2008	Hellboy II: The Golden Army	
43	October 26, 2008	High School Musical 3: Senior Year	
44	November 2, 2008	High School Musical 3: Senior Year	
45	November 9, 2008	Quantum of Solace	
46	November 16, 2008	Quantum of Solace	
47	November 23, 2008	Quantum of Solace	
48	November 30, 2008	Quantum of Solace	
49	December 7, 2008	Madagascar: Escape 2 Africa	
50	December 14, 2008	Madagascar: Escape 2 Africa	
51	December 21, 2008	Madagascar: Escape 2 Africa	
52	December 28, 2008	Echte Wiener - Die Sackbauer-Saga	

== Most successful films by box office admissions ==
Most successful films of 2008 by number of movie tickets sold in Austria.

Rank	Title	Tickets sold	Country
1.	Mamma Mia	741,268	United Kingdom, Germany, United States
2.	Madagascar: Escape 2 Africa	640,015	United States
3.	Quantum of Solace	498,829	United Kingdom, United States
4.	Kung Fu Panda	461,454	United States
5.	Hancock	442,287	United States
6.	The Dark Knight	440,927	United States, United Kingdom
7.	Indiana Jones and the Kingdom of the Crystal Skull	319,050	United States
8.	Sex and the City	302,155	United States
9.	I Am Legend	297,366	United States
10.	Wall-E	295,655	United States

== See also ==
- Cinema of Austria

Preceded by 2007	2008	Succeeded by 2009
