= La fi del comte d'Urgell =

La fi del comte d'Urgell (or the Scriptura privada) is an anonymous Catalan political tract written during the Catalan Civil War (1462–72) by an enemy of king John II. Largely composed of personal stories, including that of the death of James II of Urgell, whose right to the throne is championed. The decadence of the great noble families who supported Ferdinand of Antequera in the Compromise of Caspe is portrayed as a divine curse on them. The earliest known manuscript of La fi dates from 1598 and its editor, Xavier de Salas Bosch (1931), considers it a sixteenth-century work, though most commentators prefer a fifteenth-century provenance, some suggesting as early as 1410–33.
