= List of 2007 box office number-one films in Austria =

This is a list of films which placed number one at the weekend box office for the year 2007.

== Number-one films ==
#	Date	Film	Admissions	Ref.
1	January 7, 2007	Night at the Museum		
2	January 14, 2007	Night at the Museum		
3	January 21, 2007	John Tucker Must Die		
4	January 28, 2007	Blood Diamond		
5	February 4, 2007	The Wild Soccer Bunch 4		
6	February 11, 2007	Rocky Balboa		
7	February 18, 2007	Hannibal Rising		
8	February 25, 2007	Ghost Rider		
9	March 4, 2007	Ghost Rider		
10	March 11, 2007	Music and Lyrics		
11	March 18, 2007	Music and Lyrics		
12	March 25, 2007	Music and Lyrics		
13	April 1, 2007	Mr. Bean's Holiday		
14	April 8, 2007	300		
15	April 15, 2007	300		
16	April 22, 2007	Wild Hogs		
17	April 29, 2007	Wild Hogs		
18	May 6, 2007	Spider-Man 3	100,000	
19	May 13, 2007	Spider-Man 3		
20	May 20, 2007	Spider-Man 3		
21	May 27, 2007	Pirates of the Caribbean: At World's End	200,000	
22	June 3, 2007	Pirates of the Caribbean: At World's End		
23	June 10, 2007	Ocean's Thirteen		
24	June 17, 2007	Ocean's Thirteen		
25	June 24, 2007	Shrek the Third		
26	July 1, 2007	Live Free or Die Hard		
27	July 8, 2007	Live Free or Die Hard		
28	July 15, 2007	Harry Potter and the Order of the Phoenix		
29	July 22, 2007	Harry Potter and the Order of the Phoenix		
30	July 29, 2007	The Simpsons Movie	176,000	
31	August 5, 2007	The Simpsons Movie		
32	August 12, 2007	The Simpsons Movie		
33	August 19, 2007	Rush Hour 3		
34	August 26, 2007	Knocked Up		
35	September 2, 2007	Knocked Up		
36	September 9, 2007	The Bourne Ultimatum		
37	September 16, 2007	The Bourne Ultimatum		
38	September 23, 2007	The Bourne Ultimatum		
39	September 30, 2007	I Now Pronounce You Chuck & Larry		
40	October 7, 2007	Ratatouille		
41	October 14, 2007	Ratatouille		
42	October 21, 2007	Ratatouille		
43	October 28, 2007	Lissi und der wilde Kaiser		
44	November 4, 2007	Lissi und der wilde Kaiser		
45	November 11, 2007	Lissi und der wilde Kaiser		
46	November 18, 2007	Beowulf		
47	November 25, 2007	American Gangster		
48	December 2, 2007	American Gangster		
49	December 9, 2007	The Golden Compass		
50	December 16, 2007	Bee Movie		
51	December 23, 2007	Enchanted		
52	December 30, 2007	Rabbit Without Ears		

== Most successful films by box office admissions ==
Most successful films of 2007 by number of movie tickets sold in Austria.

Rank	Title	Tickets sold	Country
1.	Pirates of the Caribbean: At World's End	715,928	United States
2.	Ratatouille	701,647	United States
3.	The Simpsons Movie	677,001	United States
4.	Harry Potter and the Order of the Phoenix	632,941	United Kingdom, United States
5.	Shrek the Third	498,000	United States
6.	Lissi und der wilde Kaiser	477,535	Germany
7.	Mr. Bean's Holiday	437,366	France, Germany, United Kingdom, United States
8.	Spider-Man 3	367,203	United States
9.	Live Free or Die Hard	341,422	United States
10.	Night at the Museum	275,981	United Kingdom, United States

== See also ==
- Cinema of Austria

Preceded by 2006	2007	Succeeded by 2008
