= Loarre =

Municipality in Spain

Coordinates: 42°19′N 0°37′W

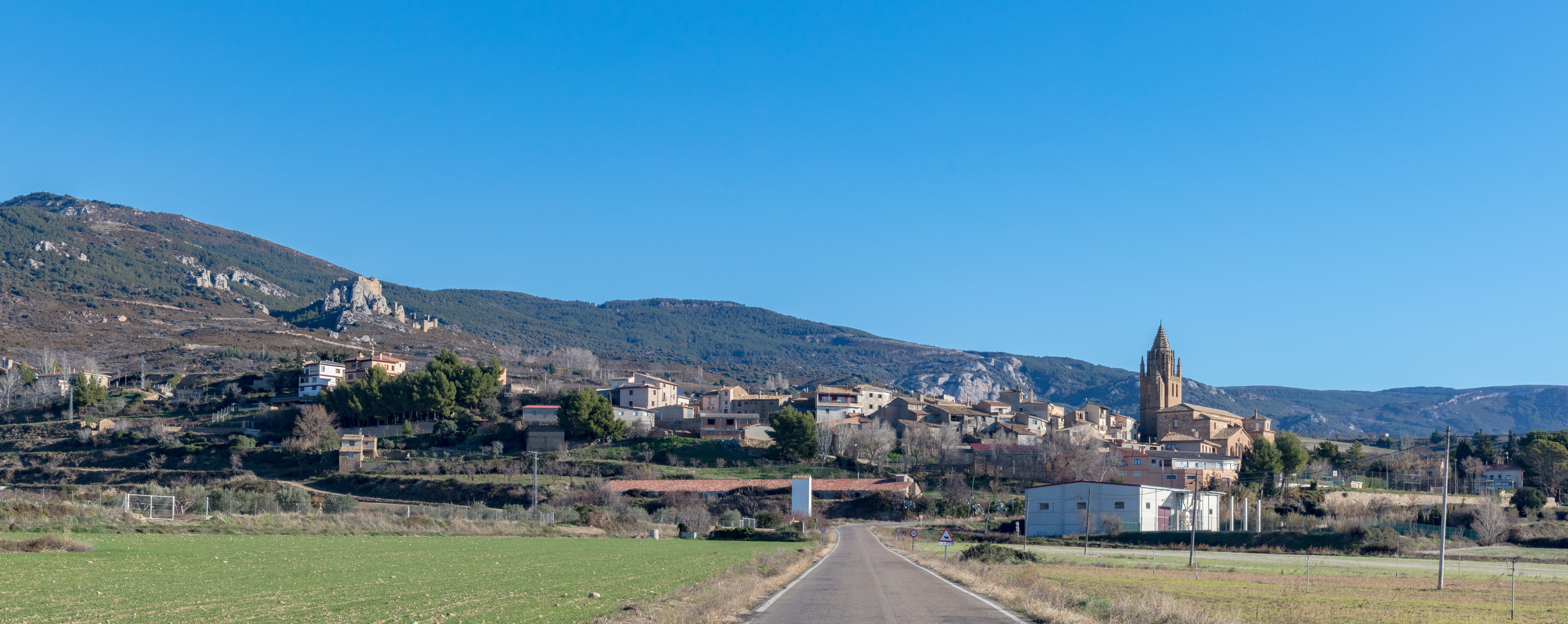
Panorama of Loarre

Loarre's coat of arms

Loarre (Aragonese Lobarre) is a municipality in the province of Huesca, Spain. As of 2010, it had a population of 371 inhabitants.

== See also ==
- Loarre Castle
- List of municipalities in Huesca
