= Kingdom of Heaven (film) =

2005 film directed by Ridley Scott

- Theatrical release poster
- Directed by: Ridley Scott
- Written by: William Monahan
- Produced by: Ridley Scott
- Starring: Edward Norton; Orlando Bloom; Eva Green; Jeremy Irons; David Thewlis; Brendan Gleeson; Marton Csokas; Liam Neeson
- Cinematography: John Mathieson
- Edited by: Dody Dorn
- Music by: Harry Gregson-Williams
- Production companies: Scott Free Productions; Inside Track; Studio Babelsberg
- Distributed by: 20th Century Fox
- Release dates: 2 May 2005 (London); 5 May 2005 (Germany); 6 May 2005 (US)
- Running time: 144 minutes
- Countries: United Kingdom; Germany; United States
- Language: English
- Budget: $130 million
- Box office: $218.1 million

Kingdom of Heaven is a 2005 historical drama film directed and produced by Ridley Scott and written by William Monahan. It features an ensemble cast including Edward Norton, Orlando Bloom, Eva Green, Jeremy Irons, David Thewlis, Brendan Gleeson, Marton Csokas, and Liam Neeson.

The film is a portrayal of the events leading to the Third Crusade, focusing mainly on Balian of Ibelin who fights to defend the Crusader Kingdom of Jerusalem from the Ayyubid Sultan Saladin.

Filming took place in Ouarzazate, Morocco, and in Spain, at the Loarre Castle (Huesca), Segovia, Ávila, Palma del Río, and Seville's Casa de Pilatos and Alcázar. The film was released on 6 May 2005 by 20th Century Fox and received mixed reviews upon theatrical release. A director's cut was released on 23 December 2005 and received a more positive feedback. It grossed $218 million worldwide.

== Plot ==
In Medieval France, Crusaders visit the village of Balian, a blacksmith haunted by his wife's recent suicide after a miscarriage. Their leader introduces himself as Balian's father, Baron Godfrey, and asks him to return with him to the Holy Land, but Balian declines. Later that night, Balian kills his half-brother, the greedy and immoral town priest, after discovering that he desecrated his wife's remains and stole her crucifix, while torching his smithy in the process. He joins his father's men, hoping to gain salvation for himself and his wife in Jerusalem. They are soon confronted by soldiers led by Godfrey's nephew sent to arrest Balian, during which many are killed on both sides, and an arrow strikes Godfrey. Reaching Messina, they have a contentious encounter with Guy de Lusignan, a prospective future king of Jerusalem who intends to break the fragile treaty between the Crusader states and Sultan Saladin with help from the brutal anti-Muslim Templar Knights. Before his death, Godfrey knights Balian and names him the new Baron so that he may obtain a military commission in Jerusalem.

Balian sails for the Holy Land, but his ship runs aground in a storm, leaving him the lone survivor. Balian journeys through the desert, recovers a horse that survived the shipwreck, and fights a Muslim cavalier over it. Balian slays the cavalier but spares his slave, who guides him to Jerusalem. Arriving in the city, Balian frees the slave, who tells him his mercy will earn the respect of the Saracens. Balian meets Jerusalem's leaders: the leper King Baldwin IV; Tiberias, the Marshal of Jerusalem, who informs him that Saladin has forgiven the death of the cavalier; and the King's sister Princess Sibylla, Guy's wife and mother to a boy from an earlier marriage. Balian travels to his inherited estate at Ibelin and uses his engineering knowledge to help the struggling residents irrigate the land. Sibylla visits him, and they become lovers.

Guy and his ally, the cruel Raynald of Châtillon, attack many Saracen caravans, provoking Saladin to march on Raynald's castle despite Baldwin ordering several Templars put to death as punishment. Balian defends the castle and the nearby villagers at the king's request despite being outnumbered. After a fierce battle that ends with the Crusaders defeated, Balian encounters the slave he freed and learns he is actually Saladin's chancellor, Imad ad-Din. Imad ad-Din releases Balian in repayment of his earlier mercy. Saladin and Baldwin meet in parley and negotiate a truce. After punishing Raynald and Guy, a weakened Baldwin asks Balian to marry Sibylla and take control of the army, but Balian declines when he recognizes that Baldwin also expects him to have Guy executed. Sibylla tells Balian that a day may come when he might wish he had committed a small evil to accomplish a greater good, and she departs in tears. Baldwin dies and is succeeded by Sibylla's son, while the fragile peace is maintained. Sibylla, learning to her horror that her son is developing leprosy like his late uncle, tearfully poisons him while he sleeps in her arms. Guy is chosen as the new king.

Guy declares war on the Saracens, attempts to assassinate Balian (who barely survives), and releases Raynald, who kills Saladin's sister. Despite Balian's advice to remain near Jerusalem's water sources, Guy marches to war, and the Saracens overwhelm the exhausted Crusaders in the ensuing desert battle. Saladin captures Guy, beheads Raynald, and marches on Jerusalem. Tiberias evacuates the royal court to Cyprus while Balian remains behind to lead a defense. After a devastating three-day siege, Saladin parleys with Balian, who reaffirms he will destroy Jerusalem before Saladin can take it. Saladin offers safe conduct to all Christians within Jerusalem under Saracen rule, and Balian formally surrenders. The surviving Crusaders leave Jerusalem. Guy angrily challenges Balian to a duel, only to lose and be spared, living in shame. Sibylla renounces her claim to the throne and returns with Balian to France.

A few years later, English knights en route to the Holy Land visit Balian's village, now home to the famed defender of Jerusalem. Balian refuses the English king's offer to join his army, stating that he is merely a blacksmith. Later, Balian passes by his wife's grave as he rides with Sibylla towards the unknown. An epilogue notes that "nearly a thousand years later, peace in the Kingdom of Heaven still remains elusive".

== Cast ==
Many of the characters in the film are fictionalised versions of historical figures:

- Edward Norton as King Baldwin IV of Jerusalem
- Orlando Bloom as Balian of Ibelin
- Eva Green as "Sibylla of Jerusalem" (a merging of Maria Comnena and Sibylla d'Anjou)
- Jeremy Irons as "Tiberias" (Raymond III of Tripoli)
- David Thewlis as The Hospitaller
- Brendan Gleeson as "Reynald" (Raynald of Châtillon)
- Marton Csokas as Guy de Lusignan
- Michael Sheen as Priest
- Liam Neeson as "Godfrey" (Barisan of Ibelin)
- Velibor Topić as Amalric
- Ghassan Massoud as Saladin
- Alexander Siddig as Imad ad-Din al-Isfahani
- Khaled Nabawy as Mullah
- Kevin McKidd as English Sergeant
- Michael Shaeffer as Young Sergeant
- Jon Finch as Patriarch Heraclius of Jerusalem
- Ulrich Thomsen as "Templar Master" (Gerard de Ridefort)
- Nikolaj Coster-Waldau as Godfrey's nephew
- Martin Hancock as Gravedigger
- Nathalie Cox as Balian's Wife
- Eriq Ebouaney as Firuz
- Jouko Ahola as Odo
- Giannina Facio as Saladin's sister
- Philip Glenister as Squire
- Bronson Webb as Apprentice
- Steven Robertson as Angelic Priest
- Iain Glen as King Richard Coeur de Lion
- Angus Wright as Richard's Knight

== Production ==
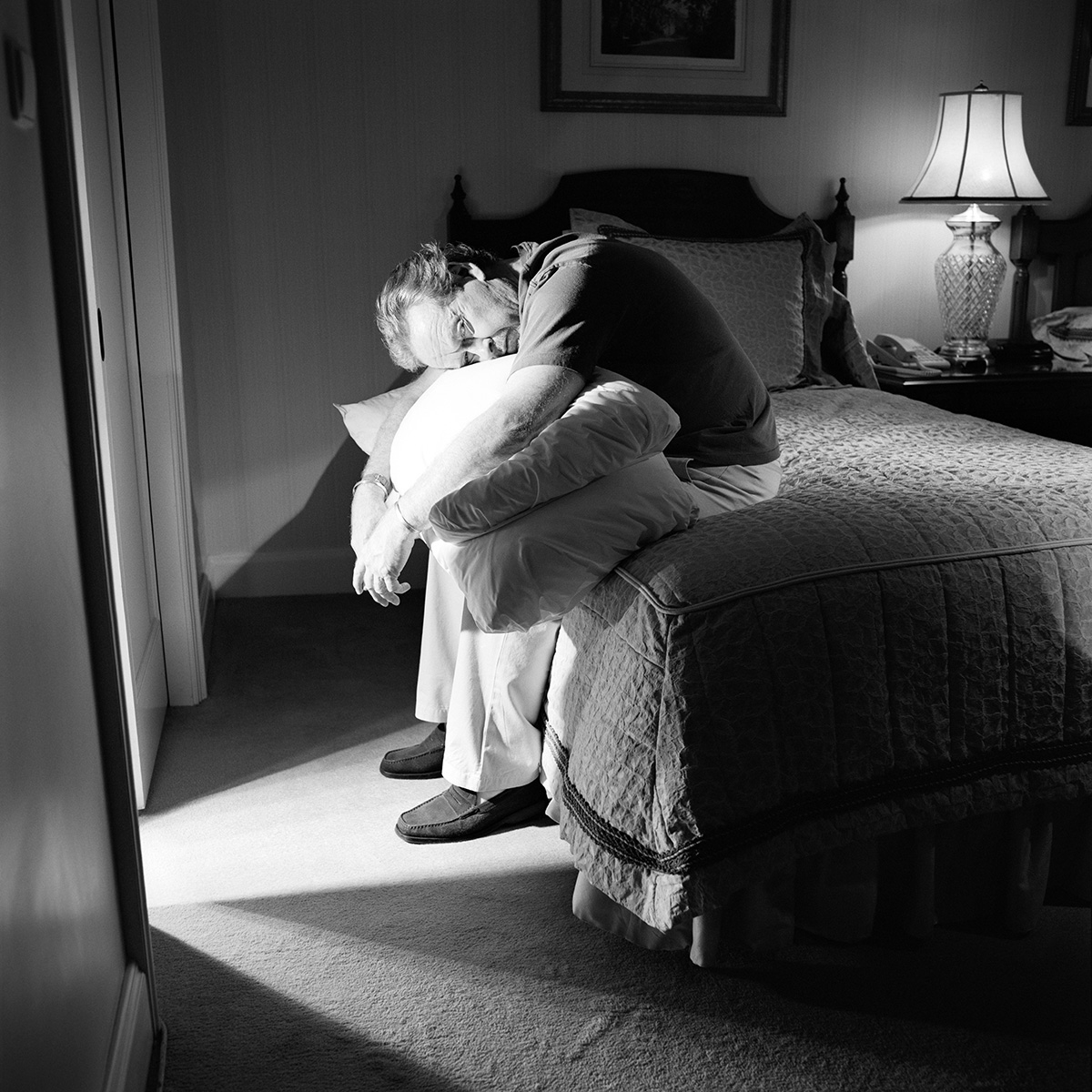
Director Ridley Scott in 2005

=== Filming ===
Filming took place in Ouarzazate, Morocco, where Scott had previously filmed Gladiator (2000) and Black Hawk Down (2001), and in Spain, at the Loarre Castle (Huesca), Segovia, Ávila, Palma del Río, and Seville's Casa de Pilatos and Alcázar. Cinematographer John Mathieson created many large, sweeping landscapes, and a large set of ancient Jerusalem was constructed based on the production design of Arthur Max.

Orlando Bloom reportedly gained 10 kilograms for the part of Balian of Ibelin.

=== Visual effects ===
British visual effects firm Moving Picture Company (MPC) completed 440 visual effects shots for the film. Additionally, Double Negative and Framestore CFC also contributed to complete the CGI work on the film.

=== Music ===
The music differs in style and content from the soundtrack of Scott's earlier 2000 film Gladiator and many other subsequent films depicting historical events. A combination of medieval, Middle Eastern, contemporary classical, and popular influences, the soundtrack is predominantly the work of British film-score composer Harry Gregson-Williams. Jerry Goldsmith's "Valhalla" theme from The 13th Warrior and "Vide Cor Meum" (originally used by Scott in Hannibal and composed by Patrick Cassidy and Hans Zimmer), sung by Danielle de Niese and Bruno Lazzaretti, were used as replacements for original music by Gregson-Williams.

== Reception ==
=== Box office ===
The film was a box office disappointment in the US and Canada, earning $47.4 million against a budget of around $130 million, but did better in Europe and the rest of the world, earning $164.3 million, with the worldwide box office earnings totalling $211,643,158. It was also a success in Arabic-speaking countries, especially Egypt. Scott insinuated that the US failure of the film resulted from poor advertising, which presented the film as an adventure with a love story rather than an examination of religious conflict. It has also been noted that the film was altered from its original version to be shorter and follow a simpler plot line. This "less sophisticated" version is what hit theatres, although Scott and some of his crew felt it was watered down, explaining that by editing, "You've gone in there and taken little bits from everything".

=== Critical response ===
Review aggregation website Rotten Tomatoes reported that 39% of 190 critics gave the film a positive review. The site's critical consensus reads: "Although it's an objective and handsomely presented take on the Crusades, Kingdom of Heaven lacks depth." Metacritic assigned the film a weighted averages score of 63 out of 100 based on 40 critics, indicating "generally favorable" reviews. Audiences polled by CinemaScore gave the film an average grade of "B–" on an A+ to F scale.

Roger Ebert called the film "spectacular" and found its message to be deeper than that of Scott's Gladiator. Stephanie Zacharek of Salon.com praised the cinematography but found the storytelling "muddled and oppressive", the battles "one long gray smudge of action with some talking in between." James Berardinelli wrote, "You may not leave the theater feeling better educated about history or enlightened about the Crusades, but you will leave satisfied that the filmmakers have delivered 145 minutes of exciting, visceral cinema." Geoffrey O'Brien describes, "The film's underlying antiheroic pessimism fits oddly with a style that aspires to the heroic." John Aberth said, "Kingdom of Heaven wants it far too simple to accommodate its unnecessarily convoluted plot innovations."

Most of the cast was praised. Jack Moore described Edward Norton's performance as the leper-King Baldwin as "phenomenal", and "so far removed from anything that he has ever done that we see the true complexities of his talent". The Syrian actor Ghassan Massoud was praised for his portrayal of Saladin, described in The New York Times as "cool as a tall glass of water". Zacharek thought Eva Green's Princess Sibylla had "a measure of cool that defies her surroundings", and commended David Thewlis and Jeremy Irons.

Lead actor Bloom's performance generally elicited a lukewarm reception from American critics, with the Boston Globe stating Bloom was "not actively bad as Balian of Ibelin" but "seems like a man holding the fort for a genuine star who never arrives". Other critics conceded that Balian was more of a "brave and principled thinker-warrior" than a strong commander, and that he used brains rather than brawn to gain an advantage in battle.

During production, Ridley Scott consulted Hamid Dabashi. Scott stated that Dabashi had approved and verified the film: "I showed the film to one very important Muslim in New York, a lecturer from Columbia, and he said it was the best portrayal of Saladin he's ever seen". Dabashi praised the film for "linking historical events with contemporary issues" and called it a "work of art by a major filmmaker".

=== Accolades ===
Awards for Kingdom of Heaven
Award	Date of ceremony	Category	Recipient	Outcome	Ref.
Golden Schmoes Awards		Best DVD/Blu-ray of the Year	4-Disc Director's Cut Special Edition	Nominated	
Goya Awards	26 January 2006	Best Costume Design	Janty Yates	Nominated	
Hollywood Film Awards	24 October 2005	Composer of the Year	Harry Gregson-Williams (also for The Chronicles of Narnia: The Lion, the Witch, and the Wardrobe)	Won	
International Film Music Critics Association		Best Original Score for an Action/Adventure Film	Harry Gregson-Williams	Nominated	
International Online Cinema Awards		Best Costume Design	Janty Yates	Nominated	
Motion Picture Sound Editors	4 March 2006	Best Sound Editing in Feature Film – Foreign		Nominated	
Motion Picture Sound Editors	4 March 2006	Best Sound Editing in Feature Film – Music		Nominated	
Satellite Awards	17 December 2005	Outstanding Actor in a Supporting Role, Drama	Edward Norton	Nominated	
Satellite Awards	17 December 2005	Outstanding Art Direction and Production Design	Arthur Max	Nominated	
Satellite Awards	17 December 2005	Outstanding Costume Design	Janty Yates	Nominated	
Satellite Awards	17 December 2005	Outstanding Visual Effects	Tom Wood	Nominated	
Satellite Awards	17 December 2005	Outstanding Original Score	Harry Gregson-Williams	Won	
Teen Choice Awards	14 August 2005	Choice Movie: Action Adventure		Nominated	
Teen Choice Awards	14 August 2005	Choice Movie Actor: Action Adventure/Thriller	Orlando Bloom	Nominated	
Teen Choice Awards	14 August 2005	Choice Movie Love Scene	Orlando Bloom and Eva Green	Nominated	
Teen Choice Awards	14 August 2005	Choice Movie Liplock	Orlando Bloom and Eva Green	Nominated	
Visual Effects Society Awards	15 February 2006	Outstanding Supporting Visual Effects in a Motion Picture	Wesley Sewell, Victoria Alonso, Tom Wood, and Gary Brozenich	Won	
Saturn Awards	8 March 2026	Best Classic Film Home Media Release	Kingdom of Heaven: Director's Cut	Nominated	

== Academic critique and historical accuracy ==
In the time since the film's release, scholars have offered analysis and criticism within the context of contemporary international events and religious conflict, including: broad post-9/11 politics, neocolonialism, Orientalism, the Western perspective of the film, and the detrimental handling of differences between Christianity and Islam.

Academic criticism has focused both on the directors' stylistic and artistic choices and on the depiction of a supposedly peaceful relationship between Christians and Muslims in Jerusalem and other cities.

The historical Sibylla was devoted to Guy, but the filmmakers wanted the character to be "stronger and wiser". Some have said that the character of Sibylla was reimagined to fit the trope of exotic Middle Eastern woman. In contrast, historically, Sibylla and Baldwin belonged to a distinct Western class that sought to set themselves apart from Middle Eastern culture. While Baldwin is described in contemporary accounts as a young man vigorous in spite of his leprosy, author Christine Neufeld argued that his film depiction showed him as passive, androgynous, and bound to his chamber, with there moreover being no accounts of him wearing a mask to conceal his illness.

Jonathan Riley-Smith, quoted by The Daily Telegraph, described the film as "dangerous to Arab relations", calling the film "Osama bin Laden's version of history", which would "fuel the Islamic fundamentalists".

John Harlow of The Times wrote that Christianity is portrayed in an unfavourable light and the value of Christian belief is diminished, especially in the portrayal of Patriarch Heraclius of Jerusalem.

Thomas F. Madden, Director of Saint Louis University's Center for Medieval and Renaissance Studies, criticised the film's presentation of the Crusades:

Given events in the modern world it is lamentable that there is so large a gulf between what professional historians know about the Crusades and what the general population believes. This movie only widens that gulf. The shame of it is that dozens of distinguished historians across the globe would have been only too happy to help Scott and Monahan get it right.

Medievalist Paul Halsall defended Ridley Scott, claiming that "historians can't criticize filmmakers for having to make the decisions they have to make ... [Scott is] not writing a history textbook".

Scott said: "Story books are what we base our movies on, and what we base our characters on." The story of Balian of Ibelin was heavily fictionalised; the historical Balian was not a French artisan but a prominent lord in the Kingdom of Jerusalem. The characters of Godfrey of Ibelin and the Hospitaller were wholly invented, while the stories of others were "tweaked"; for example, Raynald of Châtillon's responsibility for the Christian defeat is downplayed to make Guy "more of an autonomous villain".

The "Director's Cut" of the film is a four-disc set, two of which are dedicated to a feature-length documentary called The Path to Redemption. This contains an additional featurette on historical accuracy called "Creative Accuracy: The Scholars Speak", in which Dr Nancy Caciola said that despite the various inaccuracies and fictionalised/dramatised details, she considered the film a "responsible depiction of the period". Caciola agreed with the fictionalisation of characters because "crafting a character who is someone the audience can identify with" is necessary for a film. She said, "I, as a professional, have spent much time with medieval people, so to speak, in the texts that I read; and quite honestly there are very few of them that if I met in the flesh I feel that I would be very fond of."

Screenwriter William Monahan, who is a long-term enthusiast of the period, has said, "If it isn't in, it doesn't mean we didn't know it ... What you use, in drama, is what plays. Shakespeare did the same."

Professor Dawn Marie Hayes states, "Many students felt that Kingdom of Heaven was enjoyable on a cinematic level, but cautioned against being deceived by its historical values, highlighting the perception of deliberate misleading in historical representation." Murray Dahm says, "Kingdom of Heaven was an examination of the politics and issues of a contemporary, post-September 11, Middle East dressed up in medieval garb."

== Extended director's cut ==
Unhappy with the theatrical version of Kingdom of Heaven (which he blamed on paying too much attention to the opinions of preview audiences, and acceding to Fox's request to shorten the film by 45 minutes), Ridley Scott supervised a director's cut of the film, which was released on 23 December 2005 at the Laemmle Fairfax Theatre in Los Angeles, California. Unlike the mixed critical reception of the film's theatrical version, the director's cut received overwhelmingly positive reviews from film critics, including a four-star review in the British magazine Total Film and a ten out of ten from IGN DVD. Empire magazine called the reedited film an "epic", adding, "The added 45 minutes in the director's cut are like pieces missing from a beautiful but incomplete puzzle." One reviewer suggested it is the most substantial director's cut of all time and James Berardinelli wrote that it offers a much greater insight into the story and the motivations of individual characters. In 2005, Scott said, "This is the one that should have gone out".

The DVD of the extended director's cut was released on 23 May 2006. It comprises a four-disc box set with a runtime of 194 minutes. It is shown as a roadshow presentation with an overture and intermission in the vein of traditional Hollywood epic films. The first Blu-ray release omitted the roadshow elements, running at 189 minutes, but they were restored for the 2014 'Ultimate Edition' release. A remastered version was released on Ultra HD Blu-ray on May 27, 2025. This version was also shown in theaters throughout the United States, as a one-night-only event, on May 14, 2025.

Scott gave an interview to STV on the occasion of the extended edition's UK release, when he discussed the motives and thinking behind the new version. Asked if he was against previewing in general in 2006, Scott stated: "It depends who's in the driving seat. If you've got a lunatic doing my job, then you need to preview. But a good director should be experienced enough to judge what he thinks is the correct version to go out into the cinema."

== See also ==
- List of Islam-related films
- Lists of historical films
- Battle of Hattin
- Siege of Jerusalem (1187)

== Bibliography ==
- Scott, Ridley (2005). Kingdom of Heaven: The Making of the Ridley Scott Epic. New York: Newmarket Press. ISBN 978-1-55704-661-1.
- Hamilton, Bernard (2005). The Leper King and his Heirs: Baldwin IV and the Crusader Kingdom of Jerusalem. Cambridge: Cambridge University Press. ISBN 978-0-521-01747-3. Archived from the original on 2 September 2020.
- Runciman, Steven (1987) [1952]. A History of the Crusades, Volume II: The Kingdom of Jerusalem and the Frankish East. Cambridge: Cambridge University Press. pp. 403–469. ISBN 978-0-521-34771-6.
