= Castle of Loarre =

Castle in Spain

Loarre Castle
- Castillo de Loarre
- Huesca; Near Loarre in Spain
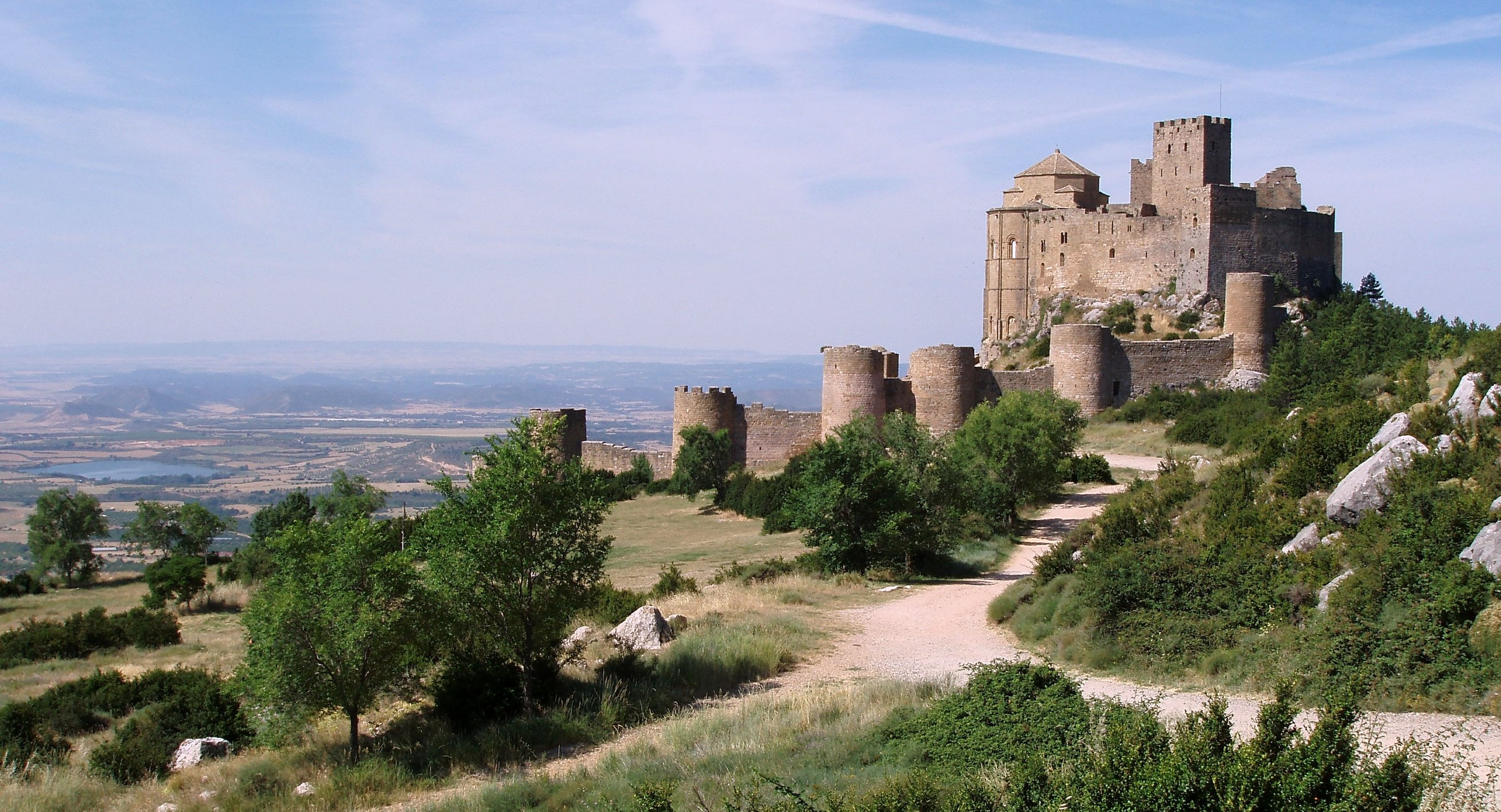

Site information
- Type: Castle
- Open to the public: Yes
- Condition: Restored
- Website: castillo-loarre.es/.

Location
- Location within Spain
- Coordinates: 42°18′56″N 0°37′27″W

Site history
- Built: 11th century (wall built in 1287)
- Built by: Sancho Ramírez

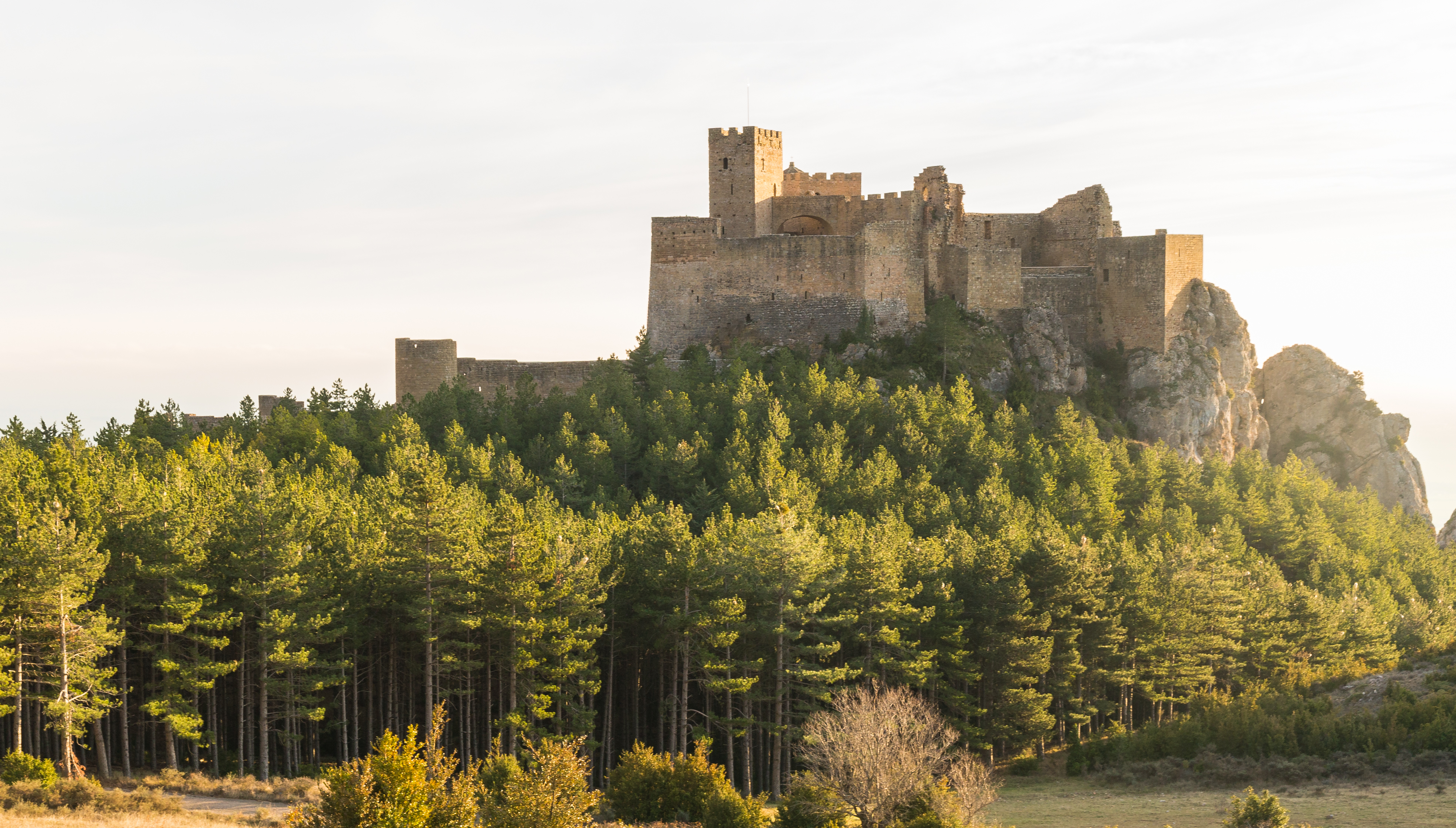
View of the castle in the evening.

The Castle of Loarre is a Romanesque Castle and Abbey located near the town of the same name, Huesca Province in the Aragon autonomous region of Spain. It is one of the oldest castles in Spain.

== History ==
The castle was built largely during the 11th and 13th centuries, when its position on the frontier between Christian and Muslim lands gave it strategic importance. The first of the two major building programs began circa 1020, when Sancho el Mayor (r. 1063–94) reconquered the surrounding lands from the Muslims.

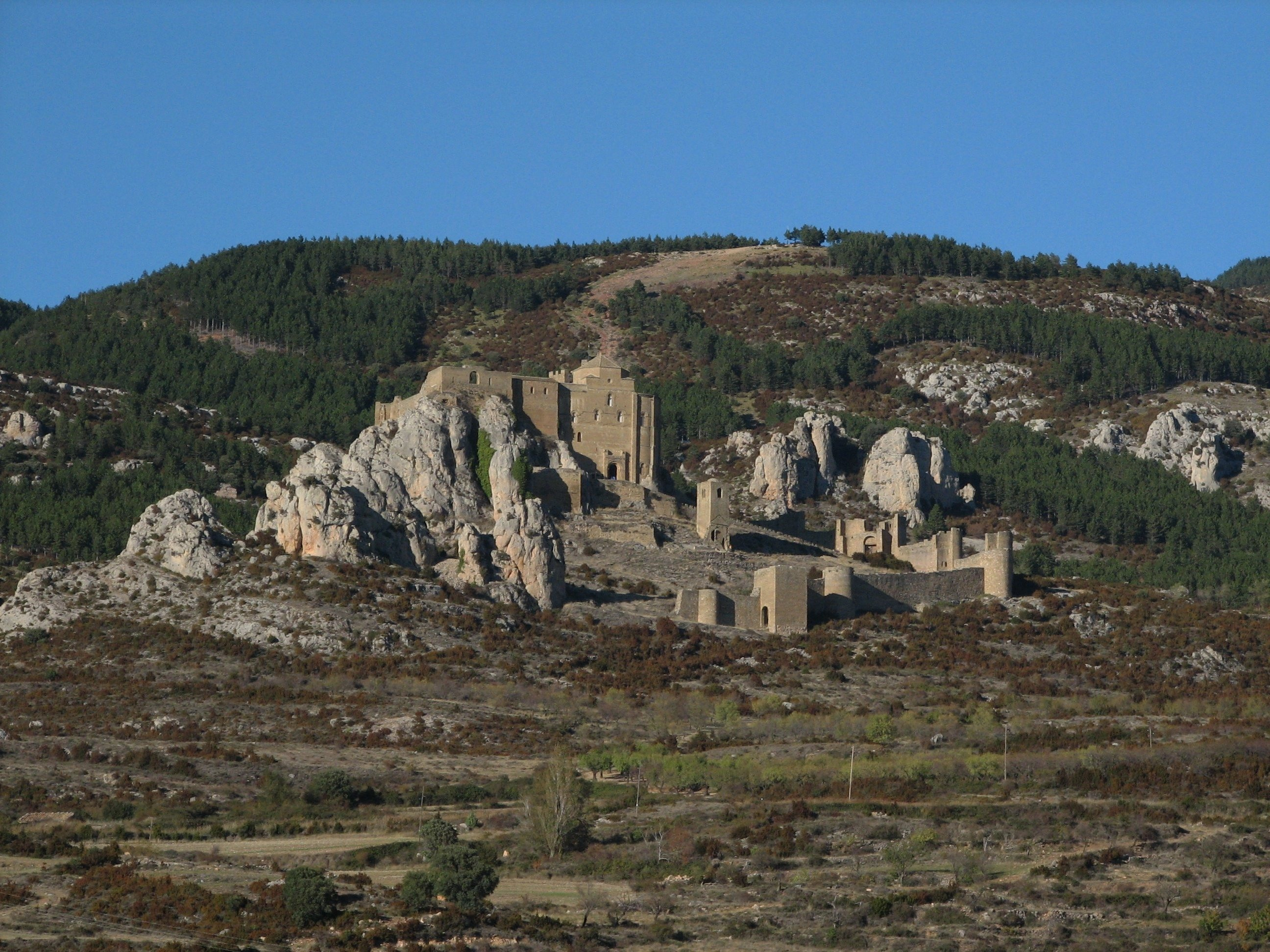
A distant view of the complex in 2005

After 1070, Loarre became increasingly important. In 1073, King Sancho Ramírez installed a community of Augustinian canons, and it was from Loarre that he prepared for the conquest of Huesca in 1094. In 1097, however, his successor, Peter I of Aragon and Navarre, donated all the goods of Loarre to a new royal monastery at Montearagon. This evidence suggests that the second major construction program was undertaken between 1073 and 1097, and much building evidently does date from this period. By comparison with other monuments, however, it is also clear that the building and decorative program continued into the 12th century.

The location appears in the 2005 epic film Kingdom of Heaven.

== Architecture ==
The castle's location on a rocky outcrop affected the layout. It was not possible to have one unified structure, and like many castles, Loarre was a collection of buildings bounded by curtain walls. Originally the internal plan included two towers and a chapel behind several curtain walls. Towards the end of the 11th century, an additional chapel was built in Romanesque style just outside the castle walls.

The outermost walls of the castle and their eight towers were erected in the 13th or 14th century. The church and castle have been the subject of numerous restorations, a major one in 1913 and subsequent ones, particularly during the 1970s, have resulted in the rebuilding of many walls and towers that had fallen into disrepair.

At least three towers, two of which survive, the keep (Torre del Homenaje) and the "Tower of the Queen" (Torre de la Reina), as well as a chapel dedicated to Saint Mary of Valverde and connecting walls are attributed to this campaign. The keep was built in an isolated position in front of the fortifications, to which it was connected by a wooden bridge. It contained a basement and five floors. The Torre de la Reina, comprising a basement and three floors, is particularly noteworthy for three sets of twin-arched windows, with columns of exaggerated entasis and trapezoidal capitals that have been related to both Lombard and Mozarabic architectural forms. The chapel is composed of a single-cell nave with an eastern apse covered by a semicircular vault. The original timber roof of the nave was replaced by a vault at the end of the 11th century.

== See also ==
- High medieval domes

== Bibliography ==
- R. del Arco: El castillo-abadía de Loarre, Semin. A. Aragon., xiii?xv (1968), pp. 5?36
- F. Iñiguez Almech: Las empresas constructivas de Sancho el Mayor: El castillo de Loarre, Archv Esp. A., xliii (1970), pp. 363?73
- A. Canellas-López and A. San Vicente: Aragon Roman, Nuit Temps (La Pierre-qui-vire, 1971)
- A. Duran Gudiol: El castillo de Loarre (Saragossa, 1971)
- J. F. Esteban Lorente, F. Galtier Martí and M. García Guatas: El nacimiento del arte románico en Aragón: Arquitectura, Investigaciones de Arte Aragonés (Saragossa, 1982)
- J. E. Mann: San Pedro at the Castle of Loarre: A Study in the Relation of Cultural Forces to the Design, Decoration and Construction of a Romanesque Church (diss., New York, Columbia U., 1991)
- Stalley, Roger (1999), Early Medieval Architecture, Oxford History of Art, Oxford: Oxford University Press, ISBN 0-19-210048-3
