= Louis III of Anjou =

Duke of Anjou (1403-1434)

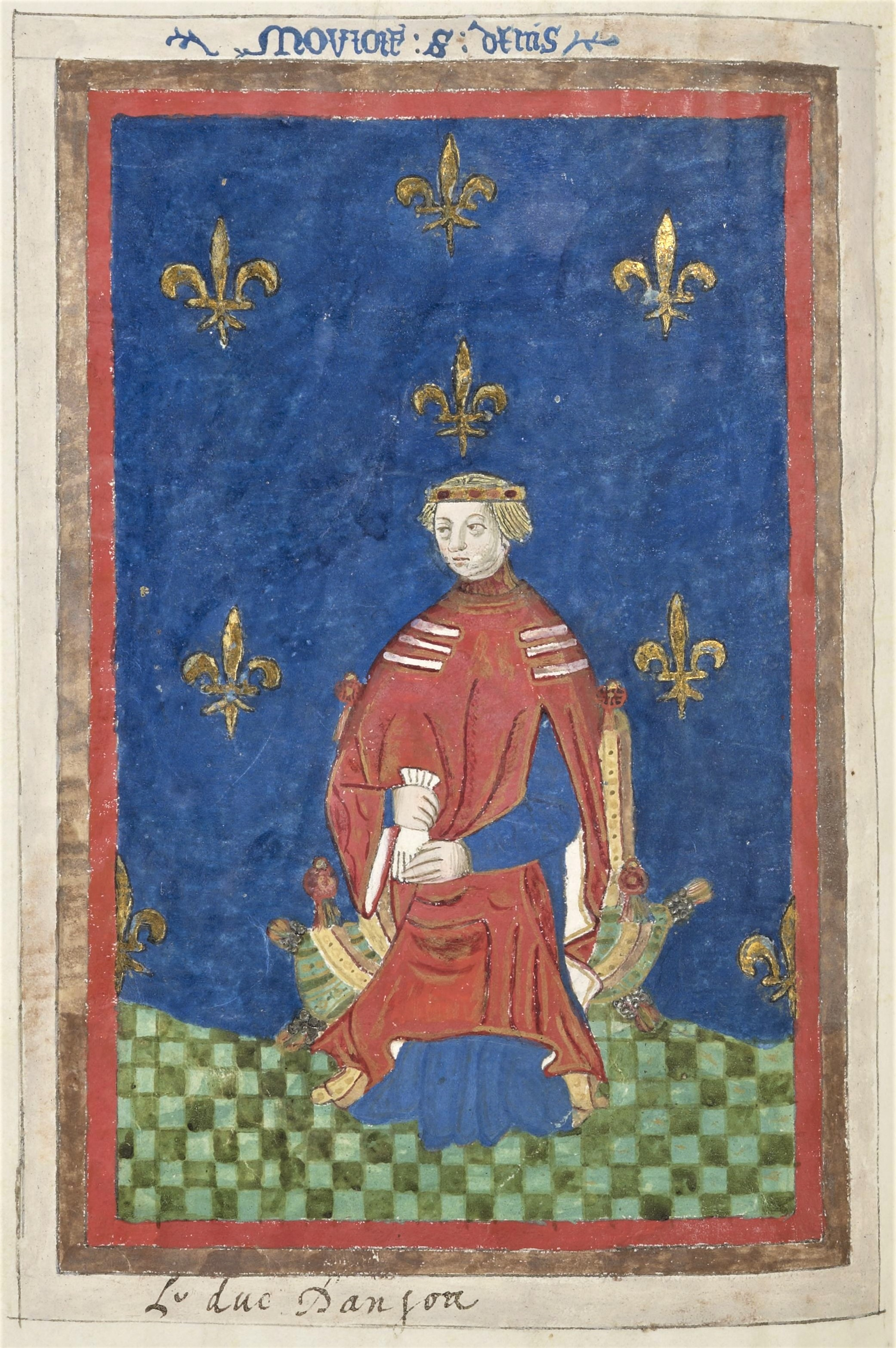
- Miniature of Louis III, c. 1450

Duke of Anjou
- Reign: 1417–1434
- Predecessor: Louis II of Anjou
- Successor: René of Anjou
- Born: 25 September 1403
- Died: 12 November 1434 (aged 31); Cosenza
- Spouse: Margaret of Savoy (m. 1431)
- House: Valois-Anjou
- Father: Louis II of Anjou
- Mother: Yolande of Aragon

Louis III (25 September 1403 – 12 November 1434) was a claimant to the Kingdom of Naples from 1417 to 1426, as well as count of Provence, Forcalquier, Piedmont, and Maine and duke of Anjou from 1417 to 1434. As the heir designate to the throne of Naples, he was duke of Calabria from 1426 to 1434.

== Claim to Aragon ==
Louis was the eldest son and heir of Louis II of Anjou and Yolande of Aragon. The throne of the Crown of Aragon fell vacant in 1410 when Yolande's uncle King Martin died. As the daughter of King John I of Aragon, Martin's brother and predecessor, Yolande claimed the throne of Aragon for the young Louis. However, unclear though they were, the succession rules of the Kingdom of Aragon and the Principality of Catalonia at that time were understood to favor all male relatives before any female. Martin died without surviving issue in 1410, and after two years without a king, the Estates of Aragon by Compromise of Caspe in 1412 elected Martin's nephew Ferdinand of Castile as the next king of Aragon. Louis' family acquired some Aragonese lands in Montpellier and Roussillon.

Yolande and her sons regarded themselves as heirs of higher claim and began to call themselves king and queen of Sicily (including Naples), Jerusalem, Aragon, and Majorca. Of those, only the mainland part of Sicily was ever directly held by Louis, and only briefly. Louis also had claims on the title Latin Emperor, which his grandfather Louis I had purchased in 1383, but he never appears to have used this title.

== Claim to Naples ==
Pope Martin V invested Louis III on 4 December 1419 as King of Naples. This was due to his conflict with the childless and aged Queen Joanna II of Naples, who then adopted Alfonso V of Aragon as her heir. In 1420 Louis disembarked in Campania and besieged Naples, but had to flee at the arrival of an Aragonese fleet. Alfonso entered the city in 1421 and Louis lost the support of the Pope, tired by the costs of the war. However, the alliance between Alfonso and Joanna broke down when Alfonso arrested her lover and prime minister, Giovanni Caracciolo. Joanna moved to Aversa where Louis joined her. Joanna adopted him and named him heir in lieu of Alfonso, with the title of Duke of Calabria. Alfonso had to return to Aragon in 1423, and the last Aragonese were defeated in 1424. Louis moved to Calabria, where he lived with his wife, Margaret of Savoy. They had no children.

Louis never became king effectively, as he died of malaria at Cosenza in 1434. His brother René succeeded Joanna upon her death the following year.

== Sources ==
- Amedeo Miceli di Serradileo, "Una dichiarazione di Luigi III d'Angiò dalla città di San Marco", Archivio Storico per la Calabria e la Lucania, Rome, XLIII,1976, pp. 69–83.

Louis III of Anjou House of Valois-Anjou Cadet branch of the House of Valois
Regnal titles
Preceded by Louis II	Duke of Anjou; Count of Maine, Provence, Forcalquier, and Piedmont; 1417–1434	Succeeded by René I
Preceded by Louis II	— TITULAR — King of Naples; 1417 – 1426	Succeeded by René I
Italian nobility
Vacant Title last held by Louis II	— TITULAR — Duke of Calabria; 1403 – 1417, 1426 – 1434 (de facto)	Succeeded by René I
