= Battle of Morvedre =

- Part of Interregnum in Crown of Aragon (1410-1412)
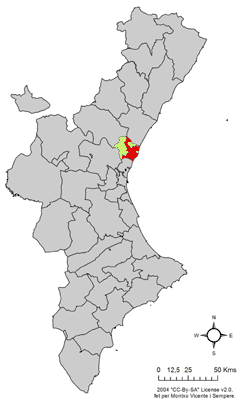
- Situation of Sagunt and his region.
Date	27 February 1412
Location	Sagunto, Kingdom of Valencia
Result	Trastamarist victory

Belligerents
Ferdinand of Antequera and supporters.	James of Urgell and supporters.

Commanders and leaders
Diego Gómez Sandoval; Bernat de Centelles	Arnau de Bellera †; Ramon de Perellós

The battle of Morvedre (1412) was an armed confrontation between supporters of Ferdinand of Antequera and James II of Urgell that occurred in the Kingdom of Valencia during the interregnum in the Crown of Aragon after the death of Martin I.

== The battle ==
Valencian troops favorable to James II of Urgell, headed by the governor of Valencia, Arnau Guillem de Bellera, advanced towards Morella to face the trastamarists. However, they were met in Sagunto by armies from Castile and Aragon, and Valencians, led by Diego Gomez de Sandoval, who were supporters of Ferdinand.

At least 2,000 people were killed in the battle, including the Valencia's Governor Bellera. The victory of the troops of Ferdinand settled trastamarist's control in the Kingdom of Valencia.
