= The Dream of Bernat Metge =

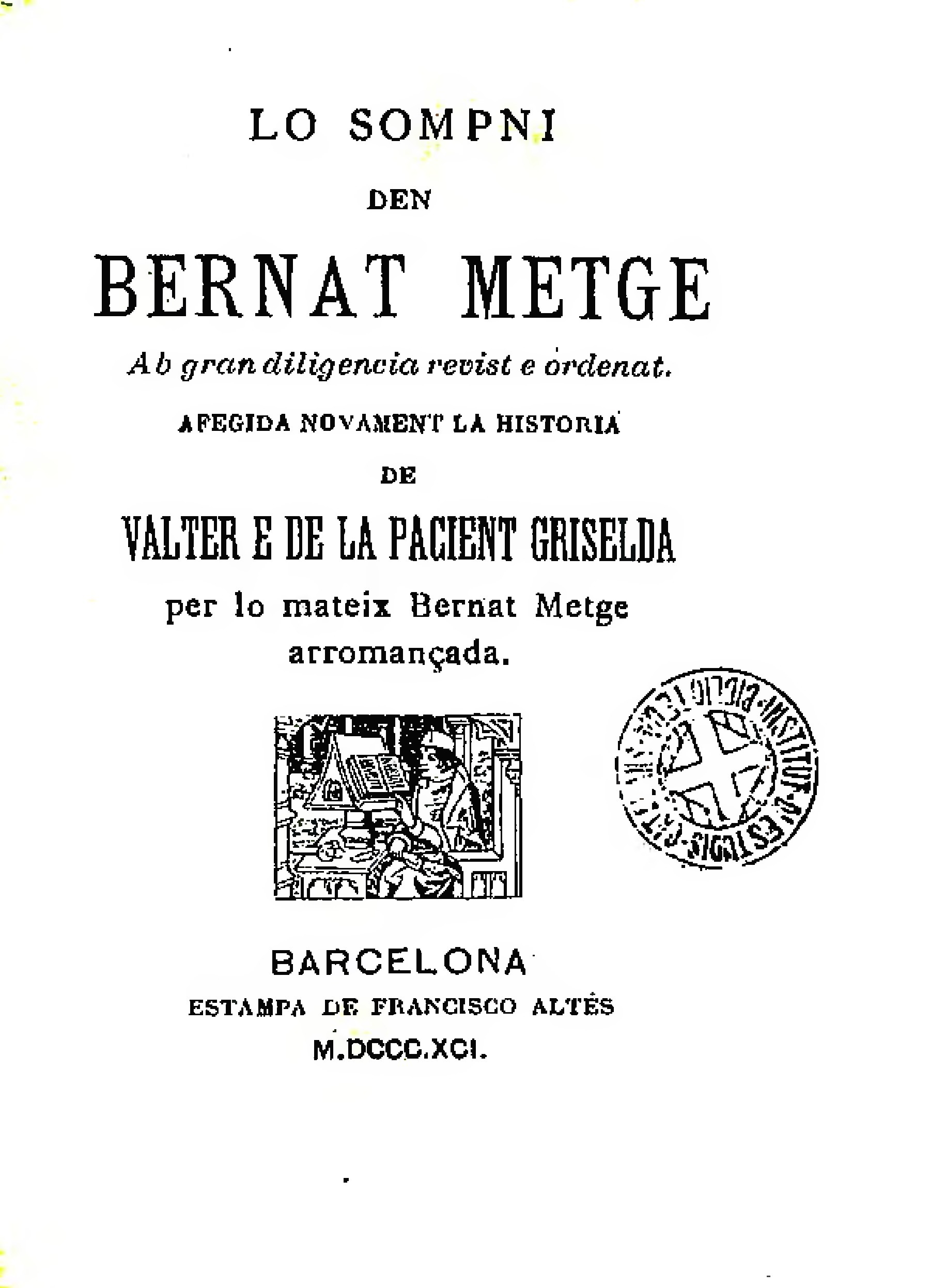
- Title page of the 1891 edition
- Author: Bernat Metge
- Original title: Lo somni
- Translator: Antonio Cortijo Ocaña; Elisabeth Lagresa
- Language: Catalan
- Genre: Socratic dialogue
- Set in: Castell Nou (Barcelona), 14th century
- Publication place: Principality of Catalonia
- English publication date: 2013
- Pages: 193
- ISBN: 9789027271884
- Dewey Decimal: 849.12
- Original text: Lo somni at Catalan Wikisource

The Dream of Bernat Metge (originally in Catalan Lo somni, "The dream") is a Medieval Socratic dialogue written in 1399 by Catalan author Bernat Metge. It is often considered his most important work and one of the earliest ventures of Catalan writers into humanism.

== Context ==
According to his own account, Metge wrote this work from prison while awaiting trial for plotting to murder king John I of Aragon in 1396, with the aim of proving himself innocent. The lack of proof concerning his alleged stay in prison has led some modern interpreters to suggest that this was a mere literary device of the author.

== Plot ==
The work is divided into four different books.

=== Book 1 ===
During his stay in prison, Metge falls asleep and, during a dream, receives the visit of John I, along with two mythological characters whose identity is yet to be revealed. Metge is skeptical about afterlife and the two engage in a rational discussion on the immortality of soul. Metge's skepticism, his rejection of dogma and the subsequent philosophical dialogue are usually seen as a sign of the author's alignment to typical Humanist views.

=== Book 2 ===
The two unknown characters finally reveal their identity: they are Orpheus and Tiresias. All four characters debate about a number of contemporary topics. At some point, the king reveals that he is in Purgatory, awaiting for his sins to be washed away so that he can finally enter Heaven. The latter point is particularly relevant for Metge's real-life defense, for, in spite of having been acquitted from all charges in 1398, he was still accused of having let the king die without proper confession, thereby prompting his soul to be condemned in Hell.

=== Book 3 ===
Orpheus explains his mythological descent into Hell. For his description of the underworld, Metge draws inspiration from fellow humanist Dante Alighieri, as well as from Virgil's sixth chant of the Aeneid. Then Tiresias gives a long misogynistic speech, several parts of which are almost word-for-word translations of Boccaccio's Corbaccio.

=== Book 4 ===
In the last book, Metge defends women from the arguments of Tiresias. He pronounces a lengthy monologue containing a long list of women with exemplary behavior from Antiquity to the late 14th century, including Eleanor of Sicily and Violant of Bar (king John's mother and wife, respectively), as well as Maria de Luna (the wife of Martin I of Aragon, who had succeeded his brother of John as king and who had acquitted Metge from all charges). He subsequently attacks men using the same arguments as Tiresias. Finally, Metge wakes up in despair and the book ends.

== See also ==
- The Dream of Scipio, written by Cicero, whose style likely inspired Metge.
- Katabasis, or journey to the Underworld.
- Compromise of Caspe, which took place after the extinction of the House of Barcelona with the death of Martin I of Aragon.
