= Bernat Metge =

Catalan humanist

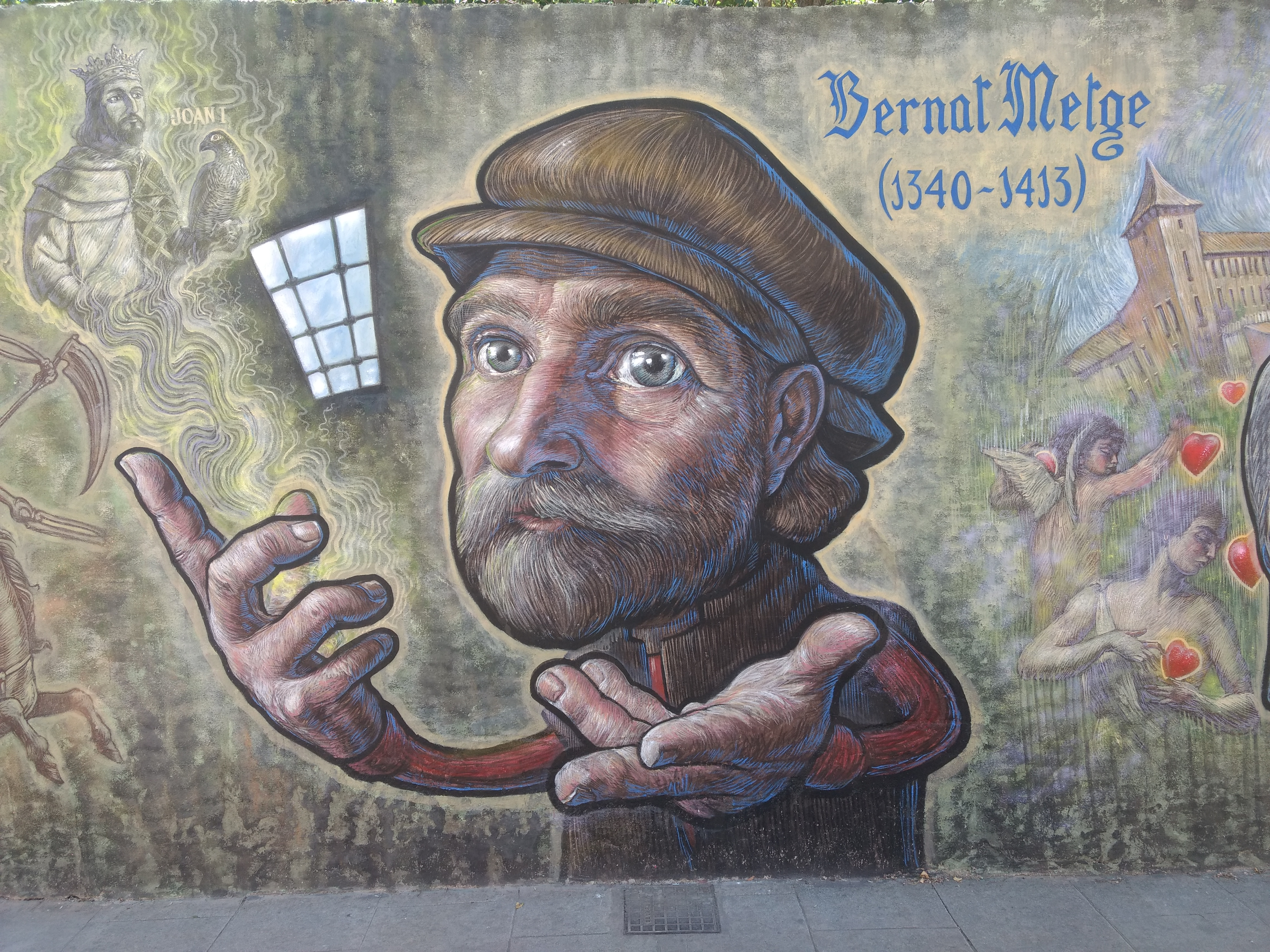
A mural of Metge

Bernat Metge (Catalan pronunciation: [bəɾˈnad ˈmedʒə]; (c. 1350 – 1410) was a Catalan writer and humanist, best known as the author of The Dream of Bernat Metge (Lo Somni, "The dream"), which he wrote from prison (c. 1398), in which Metge discusses the immortality of the soul.

== Life ==
Bernat Metge was born in Barcelona between 1340 and 1346, the son of an apothecary, Guillem Metge, and a mother named Agnès. This background allowed him to become familiar with Medieval pharmacopoeia, which would later allow him to write the satyric poem Medecina apropiada a tot mal. Upon his father's death, his mother married Ferrer Saiol, scrivener notary of queen Elionor of Sicily. It was under his stepfather's influence that he pursued a career as a notary in the royal court. He was a courtier and Secretary for Joan I of Aragon, queen Violant of Bar, and following some troubles, once more served Martin the Humane of Aragon from 1403 to 1410.

His influences included the literature of Provence, Petrarch, and De vetula, wrongly attributed to Ovid and now sometimes claimed for Richard de Fournival.

He had a profound impact on the Catalan letters and was a catalyst for Italian letters to reach the Iberian Peninsula.

== Works ==
- Llibre de Fortuna e Prudència (1381)
- Ovidi enamorat
- Valter e Griselda (1388) (a translation of Petrarch's Griseldis, in turn extracted from The Decameron)
- Apologia (1395)
- Lo somni (1399)
