= 1429 =

1429 in various calendars
- Gregorian calendar: 1429; MCDXXIX
- Ab urbe condita: 2182
- Armenian calendar: 878; ԹՎ ՊՀԸ
- Assyrian calendar: 6179
- Balinese saka calendar: 1350–1351
- Bengali calendar: 835–836
- Berber calendar: 2379
- English Regnal year: 7 Hen. 6 – 8 Hen. 6
- Buddhist calendar: 1973
- Burmese calendar: 791
- Byzantine calendar: 6937–6938
- Chinese calendar: 戊申年 (Earth Monkey); 4126 or 3919 — to — 己酉年 (Earth Rooster); 4127 or 3920
- Coptic calendar: 1145–1146
- Discordian calendar: 2595
- Ethiopian calendar: 1421–1422
- Hebrew calendar: 5189–5190
- Hindu calendars
- Vikram Samvat: 1485–1486
- Shaka Samvat: 1350–1351
- Kali Yuga: 4529–4530
- Holocene calendar: 11429
- Igbo calendar: 429–430
- Iranian calendar: 807–808
- Islamic calendar: 832–833
- Japanese calendar: Shocho 2 / Eikyō 1 (永享元年)
- Javanese calendar: 1344–1345
- Julian calendar: 1429; MCDXXIX
- Korean calendar: 3762
- Minguo calendar: 483 before ROC 民前483年
- Nanakshahi calendar: −39
- Thai solar calendar: 1971–1972
- Tibetan calendar: ས་ཕོ་སྤྲེ་ལོ་ (male Earth-Monkey); 1555 or 1174 or 402 — to — ས་མོ་བྱ་ལོ་ (female Earth-Bird); 1556 or 1175 or 403

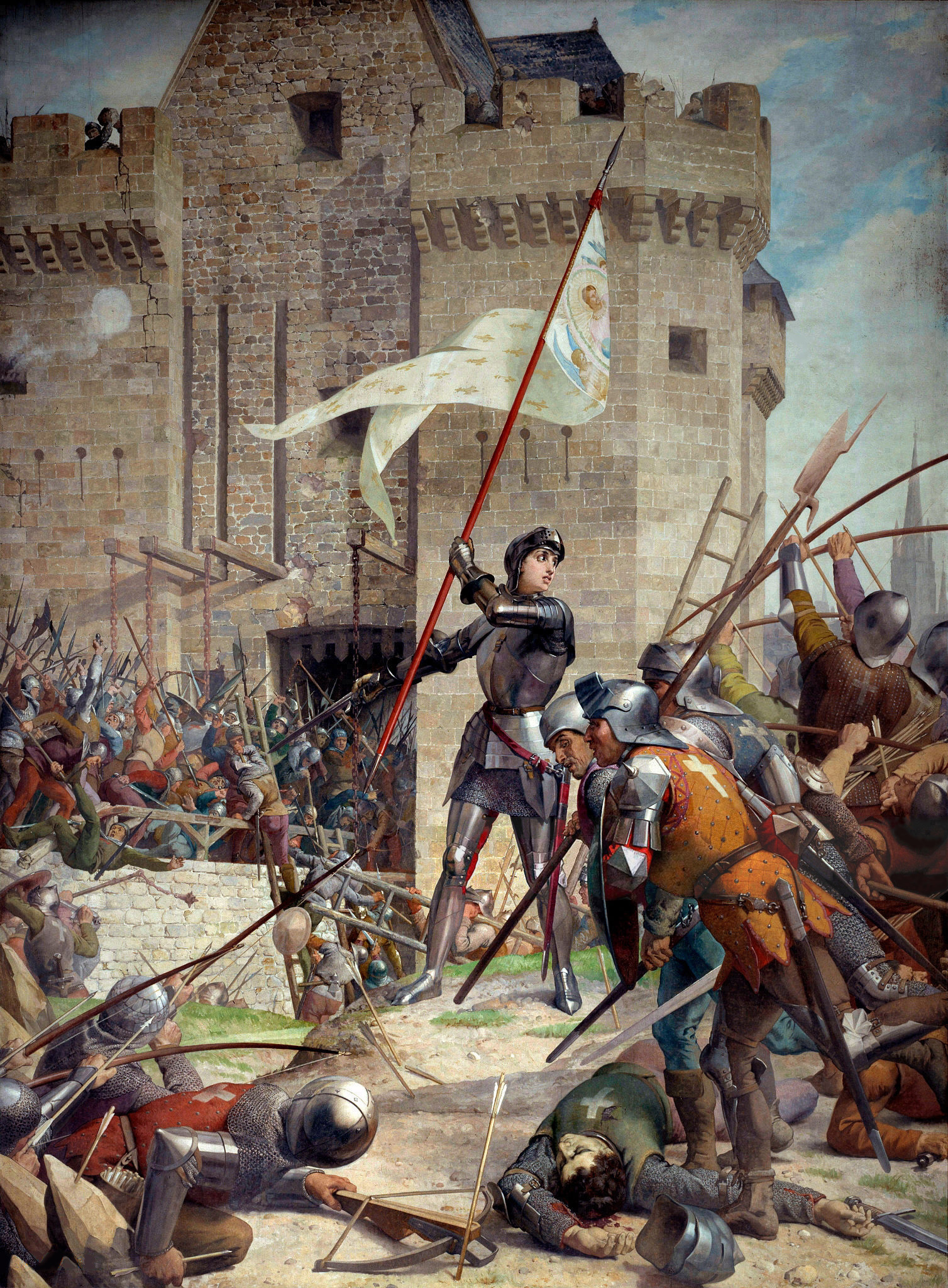
April 29: Joan of Arc enters Orléans to relieve the ongoing siege.

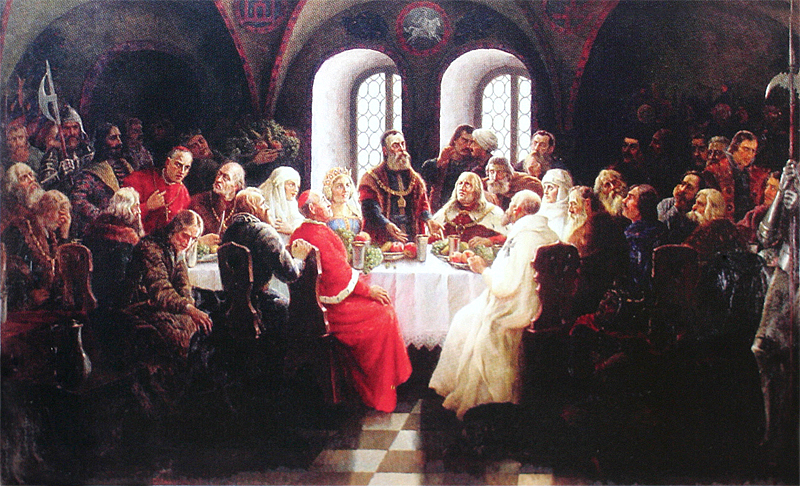
January 6: Multinational European summit is hosted by Grand Duke Vyautas of Lithuania.

Year 1429 (MCDXXIX) was a common year starting on Saturday of the Julian calendar.

== Events ==
=== January–March ===
- January 6 – The Congress of Lutsk opens in the Grand Duchy of Lithuania at the castle of Liubartas in Lutsk. In addition to the Lithuanian nobles gathered there with the Supreme Duke of Lithuania Władysław II Jagiełło and the Grand Duke Vytautas, the Congress is attended by Sigismund, King of Germany, Bohemia, Hungary and Croatia; Erik VII, King of Denmark; a Komtur of the Teutonic Knights; Vasily II, Grand Prince of Moscow; Boris, Duke of Tver; Ivan III, Duke of Ryazan; the Voivode Dan II of Wallachia; and representatives of the Pope, the Byzantine Empire and Moldavia, to discuss the coronation of Vytautas as the King of Lithuania, as well as the siege of Moldavia, entering a coalition against the Ottoman Empire, the ongoing war between Denmark and the Hanseatic League, religious unions and divisions, and assorted economic, trade, and tax-related issues.
- February 12 – Battle of Rouvray (or "of the Herrings"): English forces under Sir John Fastolf defend a supply convoy, which is carrying rations (food) to the army of William de la Pole, 4th Earl of Suffolk at Orléans, from attack by the Comte de Clermont and John Stewart.
- March 8 – After hearing that Joan of Arc says that voices from heaven have told her that she will lead a royalist army to relieve the siege of Orleans and help him secure the French throne, the Dauphin Charles of France meets with her at the Château de Chinon and is persuaded that he should provide her supplies and troops.
- March 20 – Constantine XI Palaiologos, Emperor of Byzantium, begins the siege of the Greek port of Patras, which is controlled by the Venetian Republic. The city surrenders to the Byzantines on June 1.

=== April–June ===
- April 18 – (1st waning of Kason 791 ME) In what is now Myanmar, Min Saw Mun is restored as King of Arakan at the capital, Launggyet, with the help of troops from the Bengal Sultanate and from Afghan mercenaries. He then moves the capital to the city of Mrauk U.
- April 29 – Siege of Orléans: Joan of Arc enters Orléans with a relief expedition.
- May 7 – The Tourelles, the last English siege fortification at Orléans, falls. Joan of Arc becomes the hero of the battle by returning, wounded, to lead the final charge.
- May 8 – The English, weakened by disease and lack of supplies, depart Orléans.
- June 18 – Battle of Patay: French forces under Joan of Arc smash the English forces under Lord Talbot and Sir John Fastolf, forcing the withdrawal of the English from the Loire Valley.

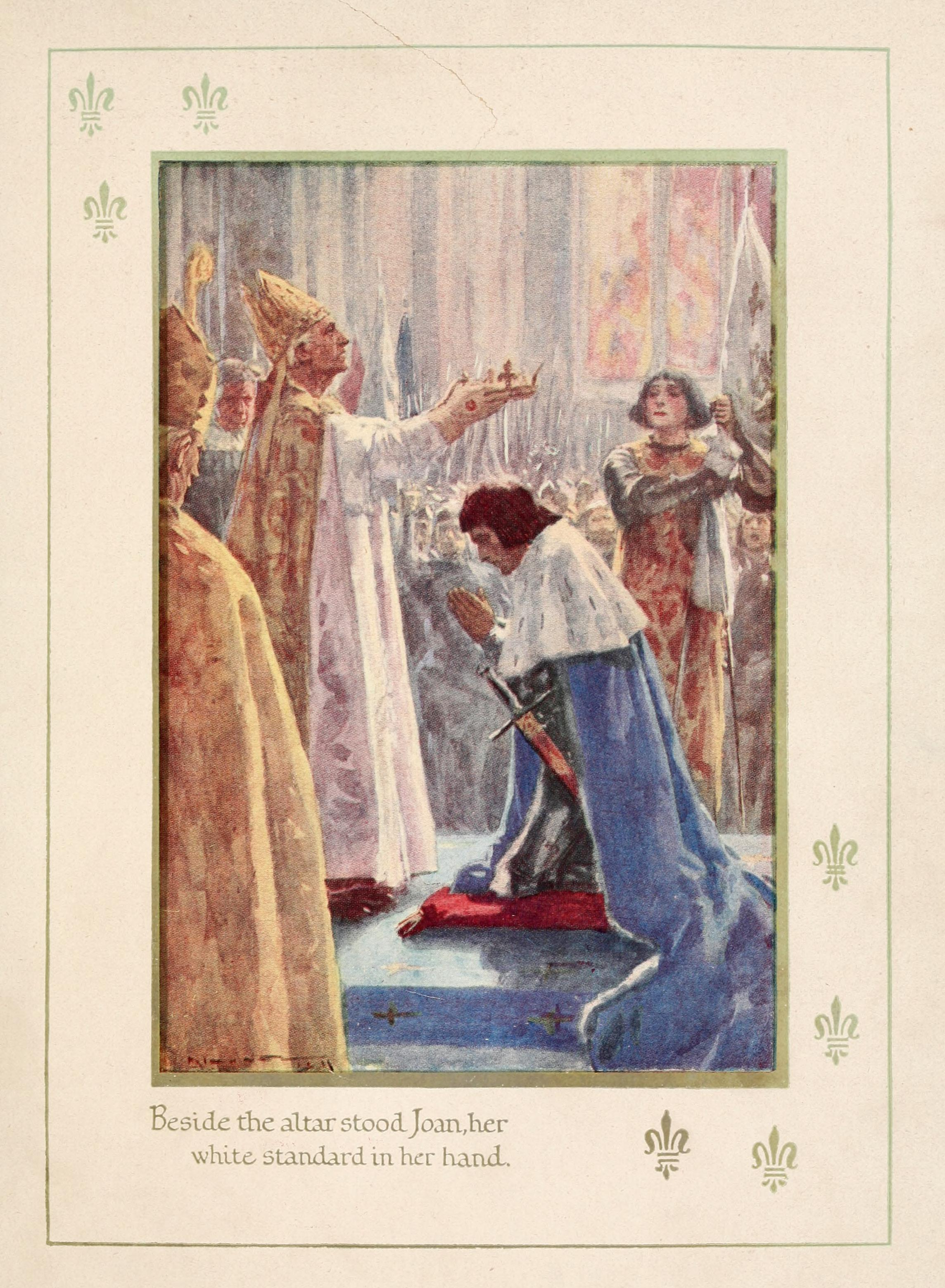
July 17: The coronation of King Charles VII takes place at Rheims.

=== July–September ===
- July 17 – The Dauphin is crowned as King Charles VII of France in Rheims.
- August 28 – Mehmed Nizamüddin is appointed the new Grand Vizier of the Ottoman Empire by the Sultan Murad II.
- September 8 – Joan of Arc leads an unsuccessful attack on Paris, and is wounded.
- September 18 – 18 (Dhu al-Hijjah 832 AH) The Hafsid Sultanate Saracens, ruled by the Hafsid Caliph Abu Faris Abd al-Aziz II and commanded by Kaid Ridavan, depart from Tunis with 70 ships and 18,000 troops in an attempt to capture Malta, but are repelled by its defenders.
- September 22 – The English Parliament assembles at Westminster after being summoned by King Henry VI, and the House of Commons elects William Alington as Speaker of the House.

=== October–December ===
- October 12 – The Kamenz massacre of 1,200 Catholics by the Protestant Hussites takes place in the village of Kamenz in the Electorate of Saxony.
- October 19 – Princess Isabella of Portugal, daughter of King João I, departs her homeland, accompanied by a flotilla of 20 ships and 2,000 Portuguese troops and royal officials, to make the voyage to the Duchy of Burgundy, where she is to formally marry Philip the Good, Duke of Burgundy. Because of storms, the voyage takes more than two months.
- November 4 – Armagnac–Burgundian Civil War: Joan of Arc liberates Saint-Pierre-le-Moûtier.
- November 6 – The formal coronation of the 6-year-old Henry VI as King of England takes place at Westminster Abbey.
- November 24 – Joan of Arc besieges La Charité.
- December 25 – Princess Isabella arrives at Sluys in Burgundy after storms have sunk many of the 20 ships that had been in her convoy that had left on October 19 from Portugal. She disembarks the next day to meet Philip.

=== Date unknown ===
- Fire destroys Turku.
- A series of seven customs offices and barriers are installed along the Grand Canal of China, during the reign of the Ming Dynasty's Yongle Emperor.
- Andreyas Succeeds Yeshaq I as Emperor of Ethiopia

== Births ==
- January 17 – Antonio del Pollaiuolo, Italian artist (d.c. 1498)
- date unknown – Peter, Constable of Portugal (d. 1466)
- probable – Mino da Fiesole, Florentine sculptor (d. 1484)

== Deaths ==
- February – Giovanni di Bicci de' Medici, founder of the Medici dynasty of Florence (b. c. 1360)
- June 22 – Ghiyath al-Kashi, Persian mathematician and astronomer (b. 1380)
- July 4 – Carlo I Tocco, ruler of Epirus (b. 1372)
- July 12 – Jean Gerson, chancellor of the University of Paris (b. 1363)
- September 28 – Cymburgis of Masovia, Duchess of Austria by marriage to Duke Ernest the Iron of Inner Austria (b. 1394)
- October – Alexios IV Megas Komnenos, Empire of Trebizond (b. 1382)
- date unknown – Emperor Yeshaq I of Ethiopia (b. 1414)
