= Martin of Aragon (heir of Sicily) =

Heir apparent to the Sicilian throne (1406–1407)

Martin
- Born: 17 December 1406; Kingdom of Sicily
- Died: August 1407 (aged 0); Kingdom of Sicily
- House: House of Barcelona
- Father: Martin I of Sicily
- Mother: Blanche of Navarre

Martin (17/19 December 1406 – August 1407) was heir apparent to the throne of Sicily. He was a member of the House of Barcelona.

== Life ==
He was the son and heir apparent of Martin I, King of Sicily. His mother was Blanche, who became Queen of Navarre in 1425. His parents got married on 26 November 1402. Queen Blanche's first pregnancy had ended in miscarriage. Nevertheless, the young queen's second pregnancy was successful, and he was born on 17 or 19 December 1406 in Sicily. He was baptized Martin after his father and grandfather, King Martin of Aragon, who informed the maternal grandfather, King Charles III of Navarre, of the birth.

Martin's grandaunt Violant of Bar, queen dowager of Aragon, proposed an engagement to her brother-in-law, King Martin the Elder, between their grandchildren, the new-born Martin and her granddaughter, Marie of Anjou. in order to see her offspring on the Aragonese throne.

The little prince, however, died a few months later on August 1407 in the Sicily. Not only did the dowager queen's hopes fail, but the continuity of the House of Barcelona was at risk. A few years later, the royal branch of the House of Barcelona became extinct in the legitimate male line.

== Bibliography ==
- Lo Forte Scirpo, Maria Rita: C'era una volta una regina... : due donne per un regno: Maria d'Aragona e Bianca di Navarra, Napoli, Liguori, 2003. ISBN 88-207-3527-X
- Fodale, Salvatore: Blanca de Navarra y el gobierno de Sicilia, Príncipe de Viana 60, 311–322, 1999. URL: See External links
- Silleras-Fernández, Núria: Spirit and Force: Politics, Public and Private in the Reign of Maria de Luna (1396–1406), In: Theresa Earenfight (ed.): Queenship and Political Power in Medieval and Early Modern Spain, Ashgate, 78–90, 2005. ISBN 0-7546-5074-X, 9780754650744 URL: See External links
- Miron, E. L.: The Queens of Aragon: Their Lives and Times, London, Stanley Paul & Co, 1913. URL: See External links
- Tramontana, Salvatore: Il matrimonio con Martino: il progetto, i capitoli, la festa, Príncipe de Viana 60, 13–24, 1999. URL: See External links
- Silleras-Fernández, Núria: Widowhood and Deception: Ambiguities of Queenship in Late Medieval Crown of Aragon, In: Mark Crane et al. (eds.): Shell Games: Studies in Scams, Frauds and Deceits (1300–1650), CRRS Publications, Toronto, 2004, 185–207. URL: See External links
