= Yolande of Aragon, Countess of Niebla =

Yolande of Aragon
- Countess of Niebla
- Born: c.1400 (?); Kingdom of Sicily
- Died: 1428; Kingdom of Castille
- Spouse: (1) Enrique Pérez de Guzmán, 2nd Count de Niebla (2) Martín Fernández de Guzmán
- Issue: Catalina (from 2nd marriage); Agnes (from 2nd marriage); Marina (from 2nd marriage)
- House: House of Barcelona
- Father: Martin I of Sicily
- Mother: Agatuccia Pesce

Yolande of Aragon or Violante of Sicily (Kingdom of Sicily – 1428, Italian: Jolanda d'Aragona, Catalan: Violant d'Aragó, Spanish: Violante de Aragón) was the legitimized daughter of King Martin I of Sicily and countess of Niebla. She was a member of the House of Barcelona. Eugénie de Montijo, the last Empress consort of the French, was descended from her.

== Life ==
She was the only daughter of King Martin I of Sicily and Sicilian noblewoman Agatuccia Pesce. She was born out of wedlock in Sicily. Before Blanche I of Navarre arrived in Sicily to be married to her father, the king sent her and her younger brother Fadrique (illegitimate son of Martin I and Tarsia Rizzari) to the Aragonese court to be reared in the care of the king's mother, Queen Maria de Luna. She was twice married. Her first husband was Enrique Pérez de Guzmán, 2nd Count de Niebla, whom she married in 1405. This marriage produced no issue and was annulled. Her second marriage was to Martín Fernández de Guzmán, son of Alvár Pérez de Guzmán, 6th Lord of Orgaz. She gave birth to three daughters. She died in 1428.

== Issue ==
- m. 1st, Enrique Pérez de Guzmán, 2nd Count of Niebla (1371–1436), annulled, no issue.
- m. 2nd, Martín Fernández de Guzmán
  - Catalina de Aragón y Guzmán m. Juan del Castillo Portocarrero, lord of Santa María del Campo and Santiago de la Torre
    - Luisa de Aragón y del Castillo (ca. 1450–?) m. Juan Ramírez de Guzmán y Mendoza, lord of Castañar
      - Catalina de Aragón y Guzmán m. Francisco de Guzmán
        - Lope de Guzmán y Aragón m. Leonor Enríquez de Guzmán
          - María de Guzmán y Aragón m. Alonso de Luzón
            - María de Aragón m. Sancho de Monroy, 1st Marquess of Castañeda
              - María Leonor de Monroy, 2nd marchioness of Castañeda, m. José Funes de Villalpando, margrave of Osera
                - María Regalada de Villalpando, 4th countess of Osera, m. 1st, Diego Gómez de Sandoval de la Cerda (ca. 1631–1668), 5th duke of Lerma, childless; m. 2nd, Cristóbal Portocarrero de Guzmán Enríquez de Luna, 4th count of Montijo
                  - Cristóbal Portocarrero, 5th count of Montijo, m. María Dominga Fernández de Córdoba, 12th countess of Teba
                    - Cristóbal Portocarrero (1728–1757), 6th count of Montijo, m. María Josefa López de Zúñiga (1733–?)
                      - María Francisca Portocarrero (1754–1808), 7th countess of Montijo, m. Felipe Antonio de Palafox (1739–1790)
                        - Cipriano de Palafox y Portocarrero (1784–1839), count of Montijo, m. María Manuela Kirkpatrick (1794–1879)
                          - Eugénie de Montijo (1826–1920), Empress consort of the French
  - Agnes de Aragón y Guzmán m. N. Suarez de Vargos
  - Marina de Aragón y Guzmán m. Pedro de Vargos

== Bibliography ==
- Silleras-Fernández, Núria: Spirit and Force: Politics, Public and Private in the Reign of Maria de Luna (1396–1406), In: Theresa Earenfight (ed.): Queenship and Political Power in Medieval and Early Modern Spain, Ashgate, 78–90, 2005. ISBN 0-7546-5074-X, 9780754650744 URL: See External links

Yolande of Aragon, Countess of Niebla House of Trastámara Cadet branch of the House of Barcelona Died: 1428
Royal titles
Preceded by Teresa de Orozco	Countess of Niebla	Succeeded by Isabel de Mosquera
