= Blanche I of Navarre =

Queen of Navarre from 1425 to 1441

Blanche I
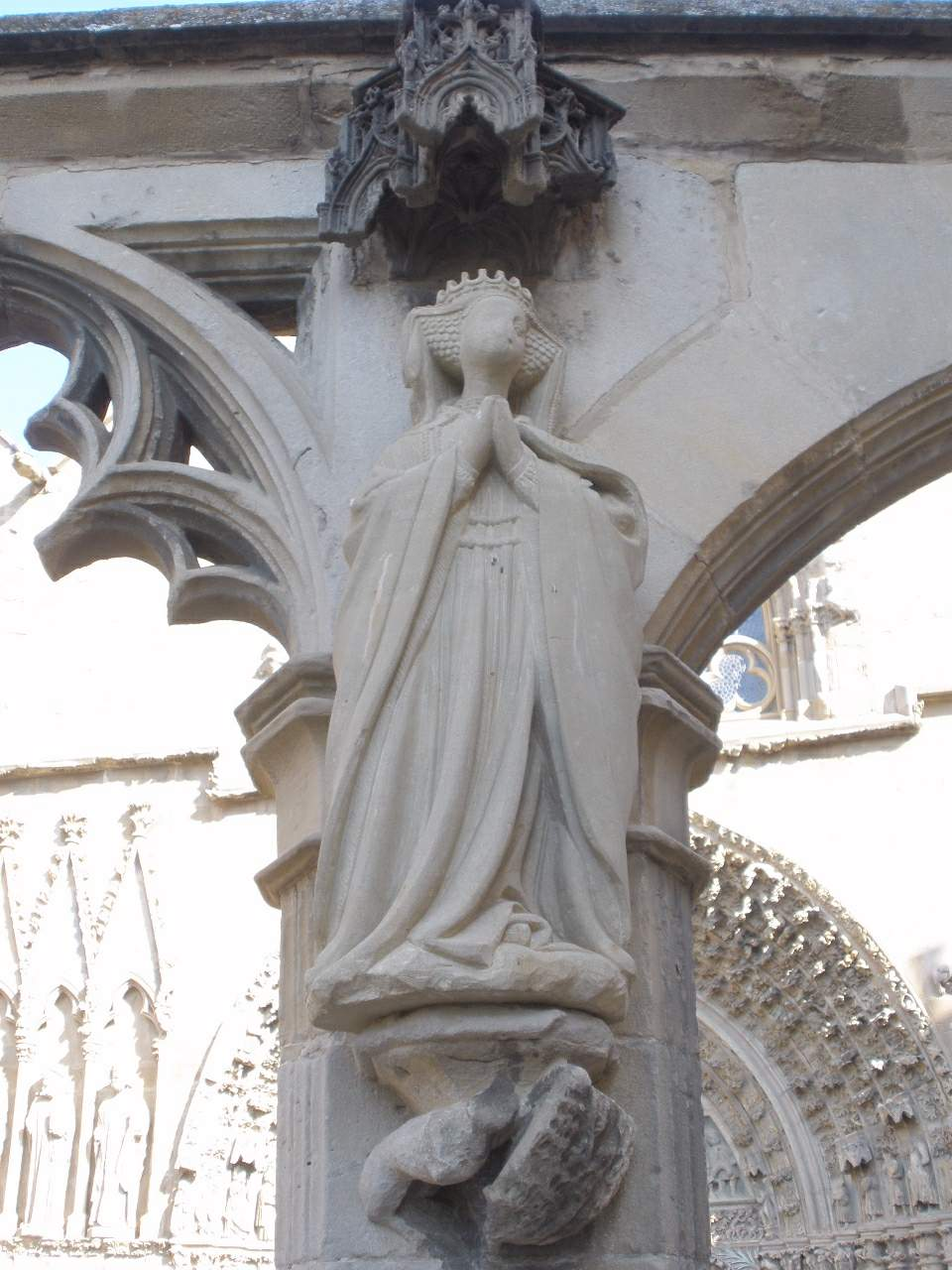
- Sculpture of Blanche I in the church of Santa María la Real, Olite

Queen of Navarre
- Reign: 8 September 1425 – 1 April 1441
- Coronation: 15 May 1429 (Pamplona)
- Predecessor: Charles III
- Successor: Charles IV
- Co-ruler: John II

Queen consort of Sicily
- Tenure: 26 December 1402 – 25 July 1409

Regent of Sicily
- Regency: 1404–1405 and 1408–1415
- Monarchs: See: Martin I of Sicily (until 1409); Martin of Aragon (1409–1410); Interregnum (1410–1412); Ferdinand I of Aragon (from 1412)
- Born: 6 July 1387; Pamplona, Kingdom of Navarre
- Died: 1 April 1441 (aged 53); Santa María la Real de Nieva, Kingdom of Castile
- Burial: Nuestra Señora de la Soterraña
- Spouses: Martin I of Sicily (m. 1402; died 1409) John of Aragon (m. 1420)
- Issue among others...: Martin, Heir of Sicily; Charles (IV), King of Navarre; Infanta Joan of Navarre; Blanche (II), Queen of Navarre; Eleanor, Queen of Navarre
- House: Évreux
- Father: Charles III of Navarre
- Mother: Eleanor of Castile
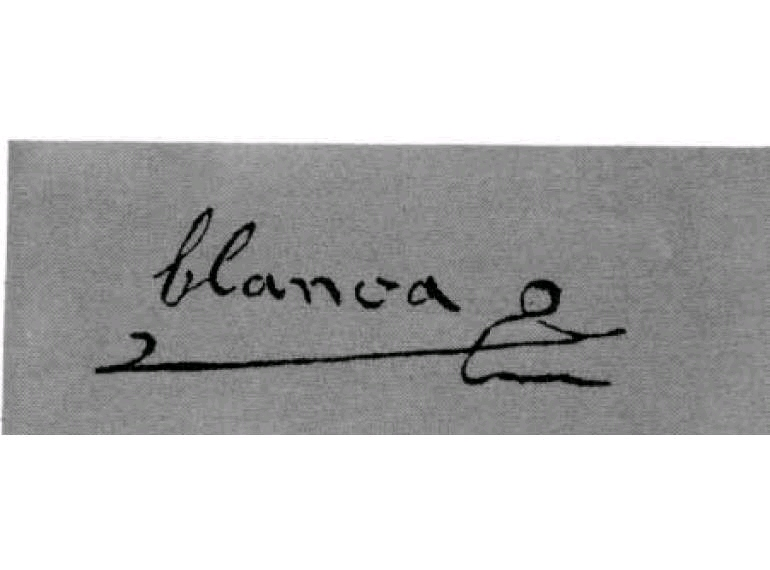
- Signature

Blanche I (Spanish: Blanca de Navarra, Basque: Blanka; 6 July 1387 – 1 April 1441) was Queen of Navarre from the death of her father, King Charles III, in 1425 until her own death. She had been Queen of Sicily from 1402 to 1409 by marriage to King Martin I, serving as regent of Sicily from 1404 to 1405 and from 1408 to 1415.

== Life ==
Blanche was the second eldest daughter of King Charles III of Navarre and infanta Eleanor of Castile. She became the heiress to the throne of Navarre on the death of her elder sister, Joan, in 1413.

=== Queen regent of Sicily ===
Blanche married firstly Martin the Younger, King of Sicily and Prince of Aragon. They were married by proxy on 21 May 1402 in Catania. Blanche traveled to meet Martin, and they were married in person on 26 December 1402. The bride was about 15 years old and the groom 28.

Martin had been in need of legitimate heirs, as he had survived his previous wife and former co-ruler, Queen Maria of Sicily, and their only son. From October 1404 to August 1405, she served as regent of Sicily during the absence of her spouse in Aragon.

From August 1408 to July 1409, she served as regent of Sicily during the absence of her spouse in Sardinia. When Martin died on 25 July 1409, he was succeeded by his own father, Martin I of Aragon. Her former father-in-law allowed her to continue as regent of Sicily, which she did also after his death, during the years of succession struggle in Aragon. She was a popular regent in Sicily, where she was seen as a symbol of Sicilian independence against Aragon. There were plans to marry her to Nicolás Peralta, a descendant of the Sicilian royal house, and thereby restore the Sicilian royal house with her and Nicolás as king and queen.

With the victory of Ferdinand I in Aragon, Blanche lost her regency power in Sicily, which was annexed to Aragon in November 1415, and left for Navarre.

=== Queen regnant of Navarre ===
Royal Coat of Arms of Navarre

Upon her return to Navarre, Blanche was sworn in as heir to the throne in Olite the 28 October 1415 and was given allegiance by the lords. On 6 November 1419, Blanche married her second husband, John, duke of Peñafiel, the second son of Ferdinand I of Aragon and Eleanor of Alburquerque, by proxy in Olite. Ferdinand had succeeded his maternal uncle Martin I in 1412.

John travelled to meet her. On 10 July 1420, they were married in person in Pamplona. The couple first lived in Peñafiel, but were called to live in Navarre by her father in 1422.

Charles III died on 8 September 1425 and Blanche succeeded him as Queen regnant of Navarre. John became King of Navarre in her right as John II, and the couple were crowned together in Pamplona 15 May 1429.

=== Pilgrimage to Santa María del Pilar ===
Juan Vélaz de Medrano, Lord of Igúzquiza, royal chamberlain of the King John II of Aragon, accompanied Queen Blanche I on a pilgrimage to Santa María del Pilar in 1433. During this pilgrimage, they all wore mantles displaying the Pillar's livery. She used this occasion to establish a brotherhood inspired by chivalric traditions, admitting the prince, fifteen men, and nine women. Members wore blue sashes adorned with a gold pillar enameled in white, encircled by the motto "A ti me arrimo" (I lean on you). They committed to regular fasting, vigil observances, prayer, and giving alms.

=== Death ===
Blanche died in Santa María la Real de Nieva in 1441. After her death, John kept the government of Navarre in his own hands, from the hands of their own son Charles of Viana, the rightful heir of the line of Navarrese kings. He would become King of Aragon and King of Sicily upon the death of his elder brother Alfonso V of Aragon in 1458.

== Issue ==
Blanche and Martin had one child together:

- Infante Martin of Aragon and Sicily (1406–1407)

Blanche and John II of Aragon had four children together:

- Charles (IV) of Navarre (1421–1461)
- Joan of Navarre (1423 – 22 August 1425)
- Blanche (II) of Navarre (1424–1464), married Henry IV of Castile. The marriage was never consummated. After 13 years of marriage, Henry sought and obtained a divorce. Blanca was sent home, where her family imprisoned her, and she was later killed by poison.
- Eleanor (1426–1479) Queen of Navarre (1479)

== Commemoration ==
The Spanish Navy screw frigate Reina Blanca, often called simply Blanca, commissioned in 1859 and scrapped in 1893, was named for Blanche I of Navarre.

== Bibliography ==
- Fößel, Amalie (2013). "The Political Traditions of Female Rulership in Medieval Europe". In Bennett, Judith M.; Karras, Ruth Mazo (eds.). The Oxford Handbook of Women and Gender in Medieval Europe. Oxford University Press. pp. 68–83.
- Merriman, Roger Bigelow (1918). The Rise of the Spanish Empire in the Old and in the New. Vol. 1. The Macmillan Company.
- Woodacre, Elena (2013). The Queens Regnant of Navarre. Palgrave Macmillan.
- Anthony, Raoul: Identification et Etude des Ossements des Rois de Navarre inhumés dans la Cathédrale de Lescar, Paris, Masson, 1931
- Maria Rita Lo Forte Scirpo: C'era una volta una regina ... : due donne per un regno: Maria d'Aragona e Bianca di Navarra, Napoli : Liguori, ISBN 88-207-3527-X, 2003
- Blanca I de Navarra in Auñamendi Entziklopedia

Blanche I of Navarre House of Évreux Cadet branch of the Capetian dynasty Born: 6 July 1387 Died: 1 April 1441
Regnal titles
Preceded by Charles III	Queen regnant of Navarre; 8 September 1425 – 1 April 1441; With: John II	Succeeded by Charles IV
Royal titles
Preceded by Antonia of Baux	Queen consort of Sicily; 26 December 1402 – 25 July 1409	Succeeded by Margaret of Prades
