= Frederic of Luna =

Contender for the Aragonese Crown (died 1438)

Frederick

Count of Luna
- Born: c. 1401
- Died: 29 May 1438 (aged 36–37)
- Noble family: of Barcelona
- Spouse: Violante Luisa de Mur
- Father: Martin I of Sicily
- Mother: Tarsia Rizzani

Frederic (Spanish: Fadrique; c. 1401 – 29 May 1438), count of Luna, was a contender for the crown of Aragon.

== Early life ==
Frederic was one of two illegitimate children recognised by King Martin I of Sicily. His mother was his father's concubine, the Sicilian noblewoman Tarsia Rizzani. In 1403, Frederic and his likewise illegitimate paternal half-sister Violant were declared wards of the Crown of Aragon by their paternal grandfather, King Martin of Aragon. The royal councilor Francesc de Casasaja was ordered to bring them to Barcelona and to care for them until their grandparents Martin and Maria de Luna decided "how to deal with the said son and daughter". Queen Maria assumed the responsibility for their upbringing and education. Their illegitimate status notwithstanding, Frederic and his half-sister were the only grandchildren of the king and queen of Aragon. The queen died in 1406.

== Succession prospects ==
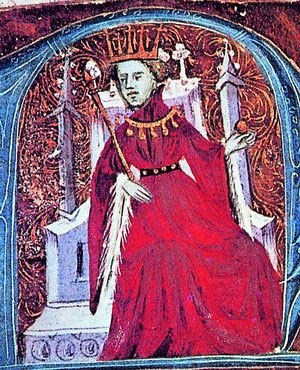
King Martin the Elder

In 1409, King Martin the Younger died. His father's death, following the deaths of his legitimate half-brothers, left Frederic as the only living male descendant of Martin the Elder, now also king of Sicily. Martin the Elder was very fond of his grandson, but was nevertheless aware that his illegitimacy rendered his claim to the thrones of the Crown of Aragon significantly weaker, especially when compared to that of the closest legitimate agnate, Count James II of Urgell. The old king intended to ensure Frederic's accession at least to the throne of Sicily. He thus sought to have Frederic legitimated by the pope, but died from laughter a year after Martin the Younger. The question of succession not being settled yet, an interregnum ensued. In 1412, Frederic's cousin, Ferdinand of Castile, became king according to the Compromise of Caspe. The nobility of Sicily preferred Frederic to Ferdinand, but the proposal to make the former into king of an independent Sicily failed.

== Military career ==
Frederic was created count of Luna and made an admiral. As such, he took part in an expedition to Tunisia, commanded by Infante Peter, count of Alburquerque, in 1425. He also accompanied the army of King Alfonso V of Aragon to Castile in order to liberate the king's brother Infante Henry, duke of Villena.

Frederic resumed his claim to the throne in the 1430s, for which he was imprisoned and all his lands, including the County of Luna and the city of Segorbe, were confiscated. He died as a prisoner.
