= Joanna of Aragon, Countess of Foix =

Joanna

Countess consort of Foix
- Tenure: 1392-1407
- Born: October 1375; Daroca
- Died: September 1407 (aged 31); Valencia
- Spouse: Matthew of Foix
- House: Barcelona
- Father: John I of Aragon
- Mother: Martha of Armagnac

Joanna of Aragon (October 1375 – September 1407), also known as Joana de Foix, was the only surviving child of John I of Aragon and his first wife Martha of Armagnac. She was a member of the House of Barcelona and was Countess of Foix by her marriage to Matthew of Foix.

Joanna was born at Daroca, the second of five children born from her father's first marriage. With his second wife, Violant of Bar, John had only one daughter who lived to adulthood, Yolande.

In Barcelona, on 4 June 1392, Joanna married Matthew of Foix, son of Roger Bernard II, Viscount of Castelbon. He was her fourth cousin, both being descendants of Peter III of Aragon. They were married for fifteen years, but had no children.

In 1396 King John died. He was succeeded by his brother, Joanna's uncle Martin. However, Sicilian nobles were causing unrest and Martin was kept in Sicily. In the meanwhile, Martin's wife Maria de Luna claimed the throne on his behalf and acted as his representative until he arrived in 1397. Still, the delay opened the way for more problems and quarrels to surface in Aragon. His right to the throne was contested by Matthew and Joanna, whose invasion Martin succeeded in quashing.

Joanna's younger half-sister Yolande claimed the throne with the support of her mother, despite Joanna still being alive. They also failed but Yolande married Louis II of Naples and had children who all challenged Martin's rights to the throne.

Joanna, who failed to become Queen of Aragon, died childless in Valencia on September 1407. After Martin's death Yolande tried again to claim Aragon but failed.
