= Margaret of Prades =

Queen of Aragon from 1409 to 1410

Queen of Aragon
- Tenure: 17 September 1409 – 31 May 1410
- Born: 1388/95; Falset, Principality of Catalonia
- Died: 23 July 1429; Riudoms, Catalonia
- Burial: Santes Creus, Catalonia
- Spouse: Martin of Aragon; John of Vilaragut
- Issue: Joan Jeroni de Vilaragut
- Father: Peter of Aragon, Baron of Entença
- Mother: Joana of Cabrera

Margaret of Prades (Catalan: Margarida de Prades, 1388/95 – 23 July 1429) was Queen of Aragon by marriage to King Martin of Aragon.

== Life ==
She was the daughter of Peter of Aragon, Baron of Entença (1352–1395), and his wife, Joana of Cabrera.

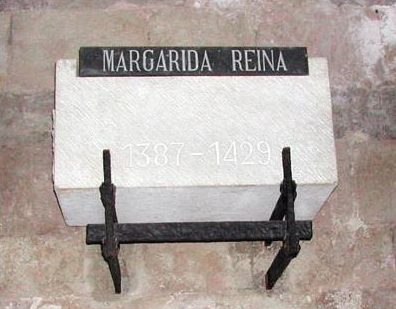
Inscription of Queen Margaret

On 17 September 1409, Margaret married King Martin of Catalonia-Aragon, a second cousin of her father. The bride was about fourteen years old and the groom fifty-three. King Martin I had survived all his legitimate children from his first marriage with Maria de Luna and was in need of a legitimate heir of his own. On 31 May 1410, Martin I died after six months of marriage. They had no children. His death led to a two-year interregnum, which was ended by the Pact of Caspe, in which Ferdinand I of Aragon, younger son of Martin's sister Eleanor, was chosen as the next king.

Margaret remained a widow for about four years. She married her second husband John of Vilaragut in 1415. In secret, she gave birth to a son in 1416, whose name was Joan Jeroni de Vilaragut (1416–1452). Her second husband John died in 1422 and Margaret entered the monastery of Bonrepòs in La Morera de Montsant. She died in 1429.

== Notes ==
Royal titles
Preceded by Maria de Luna	Queen consort of Aragon, Majorca, Valencia and Countess consort of Barcelona; 17 September 1409 – 31 March 1410	Succeeded by Eleanor of Alburquerque
Preceded by Blanche I of Navarre	Queen consort of Sicily; 17 September 1409 – 31 March 1410	Succeeded by Eleanor of Alburquerque
