= Aragonese expedition to Tunisia of 1424 =

1424 military expedition against Tunisia

Date	September – October 1424
Location	Coast of Tunisia
Result	Aragonese victory

Belligerents
Crown of Aragon	Hafsid dynasty

Commanders and leaders
Peter of Aragon; Frederic, Count of Luna; Ramon de Perellós	Unknown

Strength
Unknown	Unknown

Casualties and losses
Low	2,000–3,500 enslaved in Djerba; 3.000 captured in the Kerkennah Islands

The Aragonese Expedition to Tunisia began when Alfonso V of Aragon ordered an attack against the islands of Djerba and Kerkennah Islands, bases of pirates who attacked Sicily.

== Expedition ==
Count Frederic de Luna and Ramon de Perellós commanded a fleet that was collected by Peter of Aragon, the king's brother, who was resisting in Naples after the failure of Alfonso the Magnanimous's naval campaign. The fleet followed the coast to Genoa, blocking it, and intervening in the ports of Lestri, Bonifacio and Portofino.

The expedition departed Malta on 10 September 1424 and made its way towards the North African coast. Djerba was impossible for them to conquer because it was well garrisoned but they managed to capture between 2,000 and 3,500 people. On the other hand, in the Kerkennah Islands the victory was complete and a lot of booty was obtained, capturing 3,000 people. They still dared to attack the city of Tunis, but it avoided the attack by giving them numerous presents and freeing many Christian prisoners. Ausiàs March participated in this expedition.

The attack lasted until October 1424, when the fleet returned to Malta.

== Aftermath ==
In 1429, the Hafsids attacked Sicily and the Maltese Islands, likely in retaliation to the 1424 Aragonese attack on the Kerkennah Islands.
