= Martin I of Sicily =

King of Sicily from 1390 to 1409

Martin I
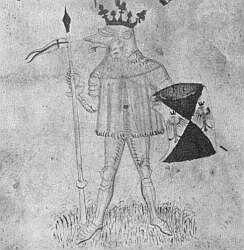

King of Sicily
- Reign: 1390–1409
- Coronation: 13 April 1398, Palermo
- Predecessor: Maria
- Successor: Martin II
- Co-ruler: Maria (1390–1401)
- Born: c. 1374/1376
- Died: 25 July 1409 (age 32–35); Cagliari
- Burial: Cagliari Cathedral
- Spouses: Maria, Queen of Sicily (m. 1390; died 1401) Blanche of Navarre (m. 1402)
- Issue: Infante Peter; Infante Martin; Illegitimate: Frederic, Count of Luna; Violante, Countess of Niebla
- House: Barcelona
- Father: Martin of Aragon
- Mother: Maria de Luna

Martin I of Sicily (c. 1374/1376 – 25 July 1409), called the Younger, was King of Sicily from his marriage to Queen Maria in 1390 until his death in 1409.

Martin's father was the future King Martin I of Aragon, and his grandparents were King Peter IV of Aragon and Eleanor of Sicily. In February 1390 he married Maria of Sicily, born in 1362/1363. In 1392 he returned with Maria to Sicily with a military force and defeated a group of opposing barons. In 1398 the couple had their only son Peter, crown prince of Sicily, who died in 1400. He ruled Sicily jointly with Maria until her death at Lentini on 25 May 1401. At that time, he repudiated the Treaty of Villeneuve (1372) and ruled Sicily alone. After his death in 1409 in Cagliari, Sardinia, his father, by then king of Aragon, ruled Sicily as Martin II.

After Maria's death Martin I the Younger married at Catania on 21 May 1402 by proxy and on 26 December 1402 in person Blanche of Navarre, who was heiress of the Evreux family and the future queen of Navarre, by whom he had an only son Martin in 1403, who died in Valencia in 1407. No offspring of his two marriages survived childhood; the only issue he left was a bastard son by Sicilian-born Tarsia Rizzari, Fadrique of Aragon, Count of Luna and Ejerica and Lord of Segorbe, born in 1400/1403, whom Martin II tried to make his successor in the Aragonese Empire. But the effort failed, and Fadrique was denied the succession by the Pact of Caspe. Fadrique married Yolande Louise (Violante Luisa) de Mur and died at Urena in 1438 without issue.

He also left a bastard daughter by Sicilian-born Agathe de Pesce, named Violante of Aragon, who died c. 1428. She was married twice: first in 1405 as the second wife (some say she was his mistress) to Enrique Pérez de Guzmán, 2nd Count de Niebla (1371–1436); and second, she married Enrique's cousin Martín de Guzmán.

Martin the Younger led the troops in the conquest of Sardinia in 1409, decisively defeating the ruler of Arborea at the Battle of Sanluri just before his own death.

== Bibliography ==
- Urso, Carmelina. "Lo strano caso di Agatuccia Pesci e Tarsia Rizzari: Due "nemiche" alla corte di Martino i di Sicilia (1374–1409)". Annali della facoltà di Scienze della formazione Università degli studi di Catania (in Italian). 2016 (15): 19–36. Archived from the original on 30 September 2017.

Martin I of Sicily House of Barcelona Cadet branch of the House of Barcelona Born: circa 1374/1376 Died: 25 July 1409
Regnal titles
Preceded by Maria	King of Sicily; 1390–1409	Succeeded by Martin II
Spanish nobility
Preceded by Maria de Luna	Count of Luna, Lord of Segorbe and Ejerica; 1374–1409	Succeeded by Fadrique de Aragon
