= Santa María la Real, Olite =

Church in Olite, Spain

Coordinates: 42.4817°N 1.6500°W

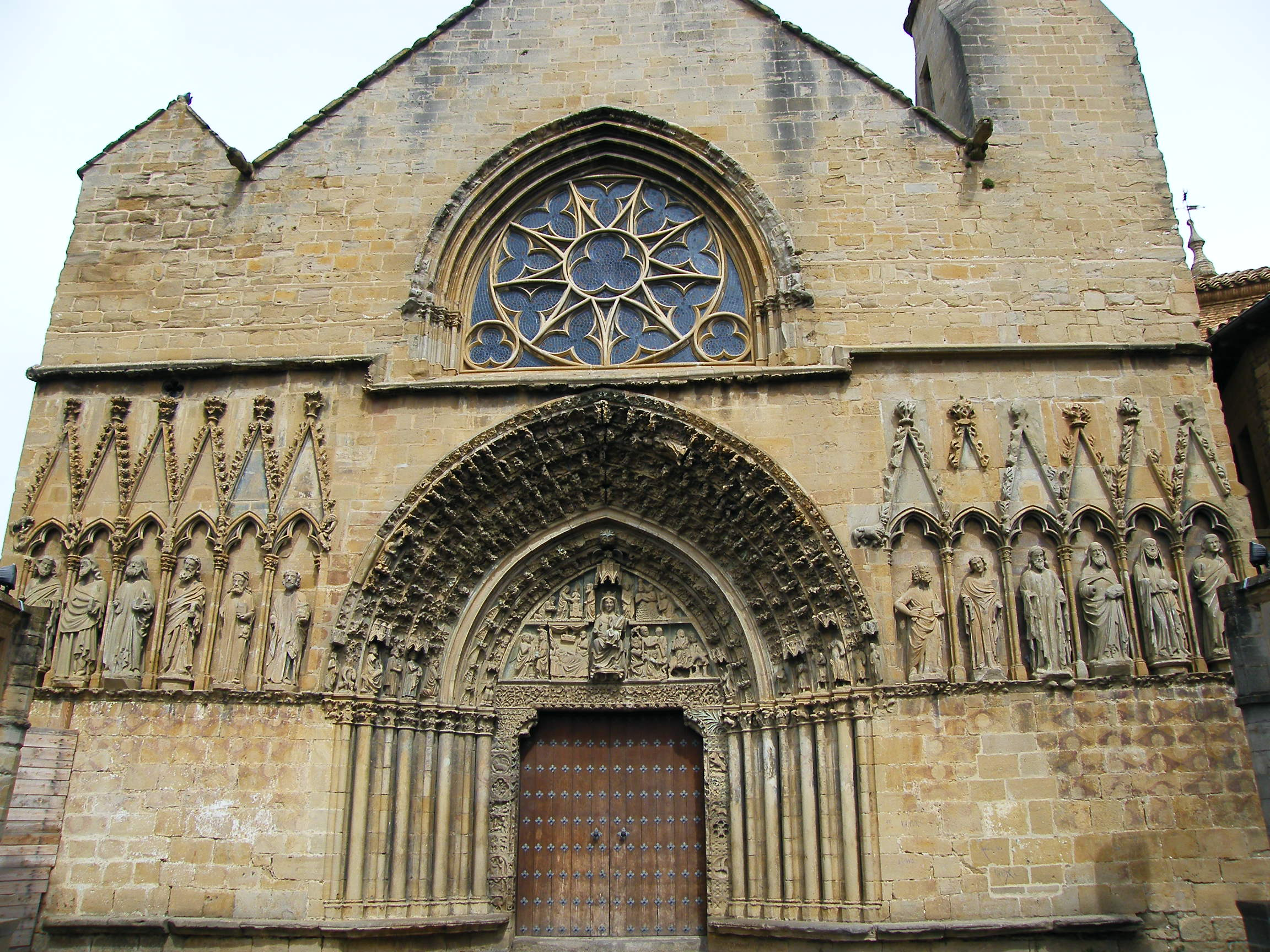
Facade of Church of Santa María la Real

Santa María la Real is a Gothic-style Roman Catholic church, located on Plaza Plaza Teobaldos 1 in Olite, region of Navarre, Spain.

== History ==
The church was erected during the 13th through 14th-centuries. It stands adjacent to the Palacio Real de Olite, much favored by King Charles III of Navarre (1361-1425).

The interior has a retablo depicting the Virgin Mary and the Christ of la Buena Muerte. The 14th-century Christ statue may derive from the former church of San Lázaro.

The facade is profusely decorated with sculptures. The portal, below a large rose window, is formed by 8 arches. In the tympanum are various stories of the early Life of Christ and the Virgin.
