= Kaid Ridavan =

Kaid Ridavan or Qaid Ridwán was a Hafsid military leader who led an attack on Malta in 1429.

== Siege of Malta ==
In September 1429, an army of about 18,000 soldiers led by Kaid Ridavan landed on the Maltese coast. The army had been sent by Hafsid ruler Abu Faris Abd al-Aziz II and had previously attacked and captured Mazara in western Sicily. The invaders besieged Malta's capital of Mdina but they did not manage to capture the city. They looted the other towns and destroyed the Augustinian monastery in Rabat.

Between 3,000 and 4,500 Maltese inhabitants were taken as prisoners and were enslaved while many were killed.
