= Siege of Malta (1429) =

Hafsid attack on Malta

Coordinates: 35.886003°N 14.403017°E

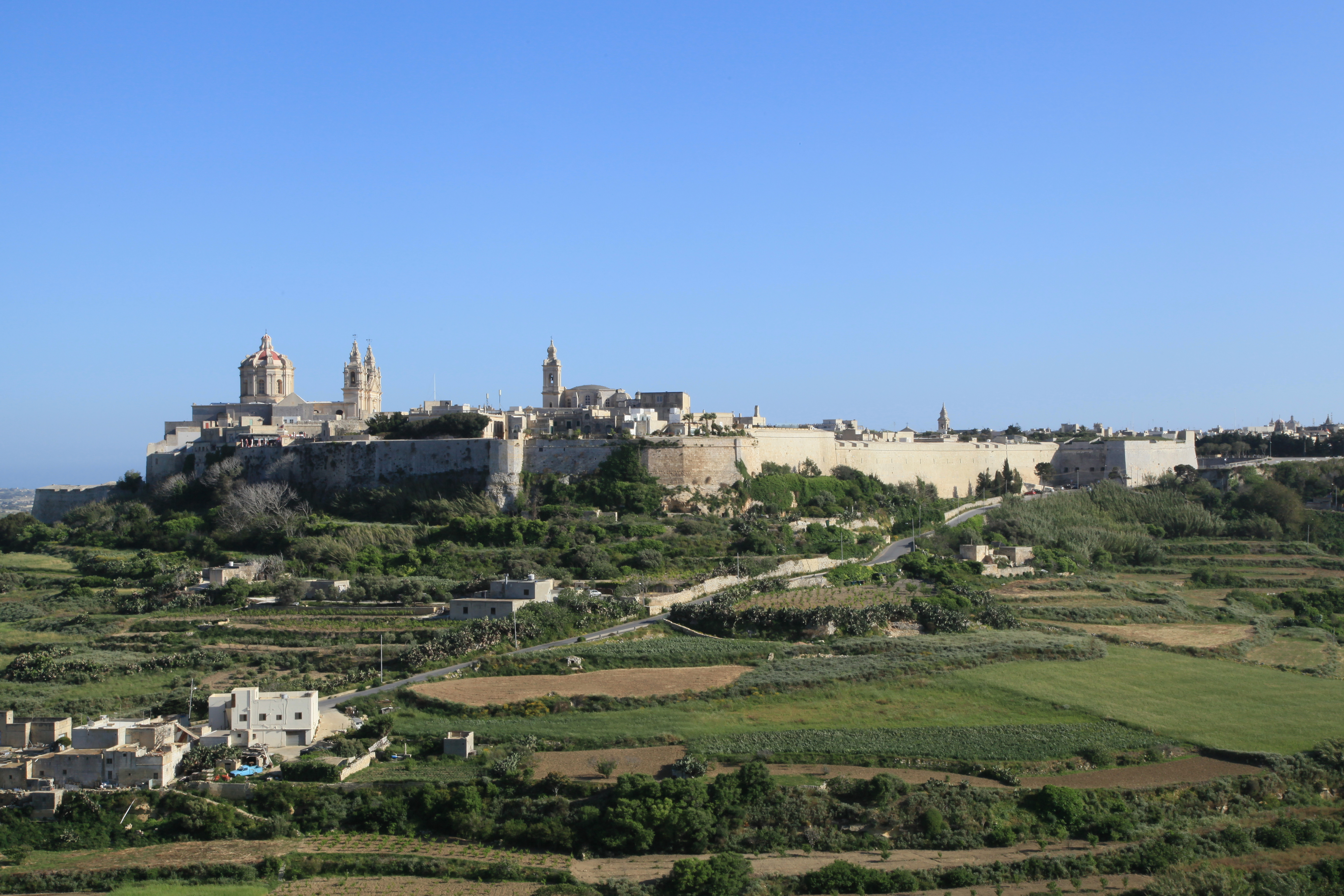
- Contemporary view of Mdina as photographed in 2014
Date	September – October 1429
Location	Mdina, Malta, Kingdom of Sicily
Result	Both sides claim victory; Hafsids loot Malta and enslave thousands before withdrawing; Mdina successfully defended by its garrison

Belligerents
Hafsid Ifriqiya	Crown of Aragon: Kingdom of Sicily

Commanders and leaders
Kaid Ridavan	Unknown

Strength
c. 15,000–18,000 men 200 horses 70 ships	Unknown

Casualties and losses
Unknown	50 "eminent men" killed c. 900 estimated casualties c. 3,000–4,500 enslaved

The siege of Malta, also known as the siege of Mdina, was a Hafsid invasion of the island of Malta, then part of the Kingdom of Sicily (itself part of the Crown of Aragon), in September and October 1429. After capturing Mazara on nearby Sicily, a Hafsid force landed on Malta, besieged the island's main city of Mdina and skirmished with the defenders. The invaders did not manage to capture the city but they plundered the island – including Mdina's suburb of Rabat – and captured thousands of people as slaves.

Both sides appear to have claimed victory, with Christian sources tending to emphasize the successful defence of Mdina and Muslim sources considering the event to have been a successful raid. In any case, the attack had a significant demographic impact on the island's small population and it remained imprinted in the Maltese collective memory through Christian legends and traditions referencing the event.

== Background ==
Malta had been subjected to a major Berber raid in 1423–1424, during which farmland and villages were devastated and a number of captives were taken, including the island's bishop Maurus. In 1424, Pedro of Aragon led an expedition against the Kerkennah Islands using Malta as a base; it is possible that the 1429 attack occurred in retaliation for this.

In 1425 and 1426, the Gozitans and Maltese respectively revolted against the unpopular feudal lord Gonsalvo Monroy, and in 1428 the islands were officially integrated into the royal demesne of the Crown of Aragon.

== Hafsid attack ==
According to al-Maqrizi, on the 18th day of Dhu al-Hijjah 832 AH (18 September 1429) Hafsid ruler Abu Faris Abd al-Aziz II sent out a fleet carrying 15,000 men and 200 horses to invade the Kingdom of Sicily. They attacked and captured Mazara in western Sicily before sailing to Malta. Christian sources state that the fleet which reached Malta consisted of 50 galleys and 20 other ships, and that the army was commanded by Kaid Ridavan. 17th-century historian Giovanni Francesco Abela wrote that the invading force consisted of 18,000 Moors.

The Hafsids then proceeded to besiege the fortified city of Mdina. Al-Maqrizi described the city's garrison as Franks or infidels; he stated that 50 of the defenders' "eminent men" were killed during a skirmish, and that a leader was captured and sent to Abu Faris. The latter then sent more men to Malta, implying that a prolonged siege likely took place.

The undefended suburb of Rabat located just outside the walls of Mdina is believed to have been sacked and extensively damaged by the invaders. This is implied by al-Maqrizi, and it is further attested to by Augustinian records which state that their Rabat convent was lost during the attack.

The attack also extended to the island of Gozo; sources indicate that the island's captain, Franciscus Platamone, fought the invaders and was wounded in the process.

The siege lasted until early October. According to Abela, the invaders were eventually "forced to depart with great shame and humiliation," but he also stated that casualties among the defenders were high, writing that "this victory cost [the Maltese] ... no little bloodshed, and the lives of many of the towns inhabitants and islanders besides innumerable damages [to buildings] that such calamitous effects of similar disasters were still being felt for some years to come throughout the island."

== Folklore and legacy ==
The 1429 attack had an impact on the Maltese collective memory in subsequent decades and centuries. The attack came to be surrounded by Christian legends, with many attributing Mdina's holding out due to divine intervention. Traditions arose which stated that Saint George, Saint Paul and Saint Agatha helped the Maltese during the siege, appearing on the walls and fighting the Muslims when all appeared to be lost.

Abela wrote in 1647 that "the enemy [was] driven back by the valour of our men, helped by God through the intercession of our Great Protector the Apostle St. Paul." In 1682, artist Mattia Preti was commissioned to produce a painting of Saint Paul on horseback holding a dagger while defending the Maltese; this is now located in the Annunciation chapel within the Mdina cathedral.

Some scholars have suggested that the unsuccessful Ottoman attempt to take Hospitaller Malta in 1565 came to be known as the Great Siege of Malta through comparison with the 1429 siege. Comparisons between the two sieges have resulted in the events of 1429 sometimes being incorrectly referred to as a Turkish attack.

== Sources and analysis ==
Sources about the siege are limited. Most known sources cover the siege from the Christian perspective, while an important contemporary source which describes the attack from the Muslim perspective is al-Maqrizi. In Christian sources, the 1429 attack is described as a Christian victory in which Mdina was defended against an invading army, while al-Maqrizi describes the same event as a successful raid. It is unclear whether the Hafsids' goals were to capture Malta or to simply raid it; the latter appears to be plausible considering that they abandoned Mazara soon after taking it, but the sending of reinforcements to Malta as described by al-Maqrizi suggests that the attack might have been more than just a raid.

Al-Maqrizi's description of the Maltese as infidels suggests that the Maltese population – which had been mostly Muslim in previous centuries – had been thoroughly re-Christianised by 1429. His mention of Franks alludes to the presence of an Aragonese garrison in Mdina, which likely consisted of Catalan, Sicilian and Maltese soldiers. The presence of Sicilians is further alluded to by the inclusion of Saint Agatha – patron saint of Catania – in the legends surrounding the attack. Apart from the royal army, some 300 men from a local dejma militia may have also been involved in the fighting.

Giovanni Francesco Abela wrote about the siege in his 1647 work Della Descrittione di Malta, although he described it as having taken place in 1427. There appears to have been some confusion among Maltese historians regarding when exactly the attack occurred, with several 18th, 19th and 20th century sources repeating the 1427 date given by Abela, and a 19th-century artwork at the Basilica of St Paul, Rabat carrying a date of 1470. Roberto Valentini researched the siege in the 1930s and determined that it took place in 1429. His work – published in the Archivio Storico di Malta in 1937 – is still regarded as the best source on the siege as of the mid-2010s.

Modern historians suggest that the 1429 attack had a devastating impact on Malta's demographics. The island's population in the 1420s has been variously estimated to have ranged between 10,000 and 24,000 people (excluding Gozo which might have had a population of some 7,000 to 8,000), so the size of the invading army was at least as large as the island's entire male population if one considers the higher end of the range, and it may have been even larger than the island's total population if one considers the lower end. It is possible that the defenders may have suffered some 900 casualties during the skirmish described by al-Maqrizi, and it is believed that between 3,000 and 4,500 inhabitants were captured and enslaved. These casualties represent a sizeable percentage of the island's population, and subsequently Sicilians were encouraged to move to Malta in order to make up for the population loss.

== See also ==
- Invasion of Gozo (1551)
- Great Siege of Malta (1565)
