= Maria de Luna =

Queen of Aragon from 1396 to 1406

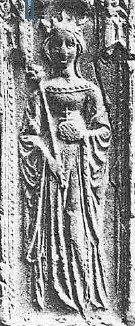

Queen consort of Aragon
- Tenure: 1396–1406
- Born: 1358
- Died: 20 December 1406 (aged 47–48); Villarreal
- Spouse: Martin I of Aragon
- Issue: Martin I of Sicily
- Father: Lope, Count of Luna
- Mother: Brianda de Got

Maria de Luna (c. 1358 – 1406) was queen consort of Aragon, as the spouse of King Martin I of Aragon, from his ascension in 1396 to her death in 1406. In the early years of Martin's reign, she served as regent of Aragon while her husband tended to affairs in Sicily, a kingdom to which he also had a claim.

She was the daughter and heiress of the Aragonese noble Lope, Lord and 1st Count of Luna and Lord of Segorbe and his second wife Brianda d’Agout, an aristocratic woman from Provence. Maria was betrothed to Martin (future King of Aragon) as a child, and brought up at the court of Martin's mother, Queen Eleanor of Sicily. The couple married in Barcelona on 13 June 1372, and Maria became queen upon her husband's accession in 1396. At the time of his accession to the throne, Martin was in Sicily, so Maria acted as regent alongside Queen Dowager Violant of Bar, and Matthew, Count of Foix until Martin's return in 1397.

Maria was politically active and exerted influence upon both policy and society, and was considered by some a more talented ruler than Martin himself. She supported the poor financially, handled taxes, welcomed Jewish and Muslim refugees, attempted to end conflict between noble houses, and corresponded directly with the Avignon-based Antipope Benedict XIII (himself Aragonese) to suggest banning laws and practices she saw as unjust. Described as wise, just, merciful, and religious without being a fanatic, she was interested in music and literature but unimpressed by pomp and luxury.

== Early years ==
Born in 1358, Maria was the eldest child of Count Lope de Luna and his second wife, Brianda d’Agout. Her family was one of the most influential in Spain, its members occupying some of the loftiest political and religious offices in the realm. She could, for example, count Lope Fernandez de Luna, Archbishop of Zaragoza and Antipope Benedict XIII amongst her relations. Her father promoted the interests of the family still further. His unwavering loyalty to and political service on behalf of the Aragonese Crown was handsomely rewarded – first he was knighted then, several years later, made a count. Her house thereafter had the distinction of being the only one in Aragon with a member to reach the rank of "count". As Lope's first marriage to Violant of Aragon produced no children, Maria was formally named her father's sole heir shortly after her birth. Although Lope had an older, illegitimate son and went on to have a second, posthumous daughter by Brianda, Maria's status as heir was never compromised or revoked.

=== Betrothal ===
Lope's death in 1360 left two-year-old Maria as one of the wealthiest landowners in Spain. For this reason, she soon attracted the attention of Peter IV the Ceremonious, King of Aragon, who was eager to arrange a marriage for his younger son, Martin. The negotiations were conducted on Maria's side by her mother and her powerful kinsman, the Archbishop of Zaragoza. Finalized in the summer of 1361, the betrothal terms stipulated that Maria would remain with her own family until age eight, at which point she would move to the court of her future mother-in-law, Eleanor of Sicily, before marrying Martin at the age of fourteen.

== At the Aragonese court ==
The schedule described in Maria and Martin's betrothal contract appears to have been expedited somewhat. Maria first shows up in Queen Eleanor's account books as early as 1362, suggesting that she moved to court around age four or five – several years earlier than the terms of her engagement originally stipulated. Thus, she grew up in close proximity to her future husband. Although there is little information available about her upbringing at court, her education was in all likelihood a thorough one, given surviving evidence of her writing, the collection of books she possessed, and how quickly she took over the administration of her estates upon coming of age.

=== Marriage ===
On 13 June 1372 Maria and Martin wed at the Church of Santa Maria del Mar in Barcelona, in the presence of King Peter, Bishop Jaume of Valencia, and many of the realm's most distinguished noblemen. In the ensuing years, Maria was largely preoccupied with child-bearing, household administration, and the management of her personal estates. She and her husband enjoyed considerable royal favor; in the fifteen years following Maria and Martin's marriage, King Peter continued to bestow offices and lands upon his younger son. Upon Peter's death on 5 January 1368, his firstborn son succeeded him as King John I. Within weeks of his accession to the throne, John made his brother Martin Duke of Montblanc. Previously the only other duchy in Aragon was that of Girona, a title reserved for the heir to the throne. Such a grant was therefore an enormous honor for Martin and the newly made duchess, Maria, as well.

== Queenship ==
=== Regency ===
In 1396, King John died without a legitimate heir. The throne of Aragon consequently passed to John's younger brother, Maria's husband Martin. At this time, however, Martin was on a military campaign in Sicily and would not receive word of his brother's death for a number of weeks. Fortuitously at hand in Barcelona, Maria was therefore acclaimed queen and appointed to serve as the Crown's lieutenant-general in her husband's absence. Maria's transition from duchess to queen was fraught with insurrection and uncertainty. In a desperate bid to retain power, the dowager queen, Violant of Bar, insisted that she was pregnant with John's posthumous child. Many nobles were subsequently hesitant to support Maria and Martin right away, in case Violant should produce a son. At the same time, John's daughter from his first marriage, Joanna, attempted to claim the Aragonese throne for herself, a claim supported by her husband, Count Matthew of Foix, and his powerful family. Amidst this unrest, Maria unsuccessfully tried to convince Martin to return to Aragon and assist her in stabilizing the realm. Reluctant to abandon his military campaign, however, Martin resisted his wife's entreaties for many months. Claiming to be concerned about Violant's health during the latter's supposed pregnancy, Maria had her rival removed to one of her own castles, isolating her from her supporters. Soon enough, Violant's pregnancy was exposed as a sham. Maria then assembled an army, imprisoned Violant and Matthew's suspected supporters, and stripped them of their Aragonese holdings. After a series of advances and retreats by Joanna and Matthew, Maria finally and decisively subdued them. Martin returned home soon thereafter.

=== Return of Martin ===
Martin's return to Aragon in 1397 – many months into his reign – meant the end of Maria's time as lieutenant-general. Her importance over the next thirteen years before her death, however, remained substantial. She had a close relationship with her surviving son, Martin, and was a critical source of advice for him during his brief reign over Sicily. Her husband also clearly continued to view her as a key counselor and source of support, a relationship reflected by their extensive epistolary exchanges.

== Faith and spirituality ==
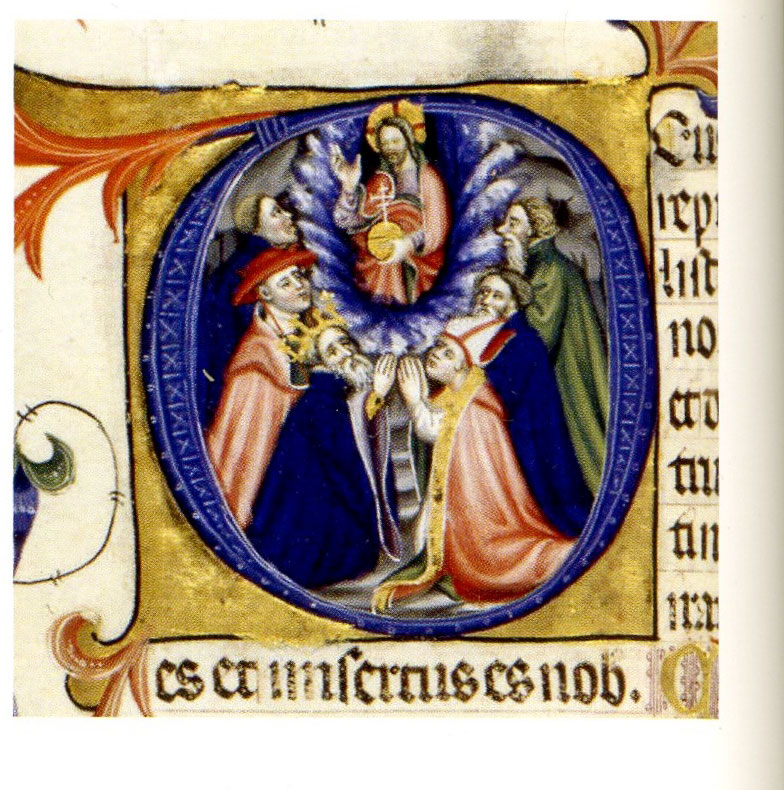
Martin I's illuminated text of psalm 59

María de Luna was a proponent of the so-called Devotio Moderna, a type of Christian worship that rose to prominence in the later Middle Ages which emphasized oral prayer and intense affective meditation upon the words and deeds of Jesus. Joan Eiximenio was her personal confessor, and he translated Arbor vitae crucifixus ("the book of life of the crucified") of Ubertino de Calae (1259–1330) into Catalan. This project led to Eiximenio's realization that more texts should be translated into Catalan, especially for use during the 40 days of Lent. During María and Martin's reign, he compiled "Quarentena de contemplacio", a collection of prayers and meditations for Lent.

María de Luna associated with the Franciscan friars and donated money for their monastic foundation of the Holy Spirit (the Monasterio del Santo Espíritu).

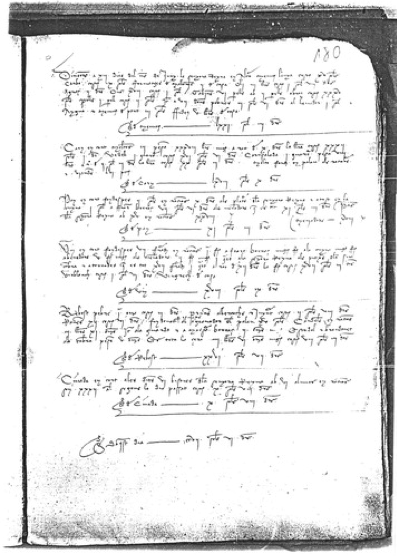
Inventory of items María de Luna's household used.

== Day to day administration ==
Records of Maria de Luna's court's food consumption, purchases, food quality and quantity, and methods of preparation have implications for structures of daily life in the Iberian Peninsula during the early fifteenth century. Compared to those surviving for other households of similar rank in this period, the accounts of Maria de Luna in "Food in the Accounts of a Travelling lady: Maria de Luna, queen of Aragon, in 1403" contain more detail, describing specific dishes cooked for the queen's table, the food consumption per person, the weight of the animals used for meat, and the amounts of wheat used to make a certain quantity of bread. As with the king, every meal Maria de Luna ate was a public display; what she ate, drank, and how she behaved distinguished her from others and made her a model for those around her. Customs were distinct in every royal household, and Maria de Luna's was defined by "her close relationship with the mendicant orders and with charity, but also through the attention she paid to medical advice, given her fragile health." Even during Lent, for instance, she ate poultry at her doctors' advice due to the "vitality [it] brought to sick bodies". Maria de Luna's accounts from 1403 also reflect the lavishness of the court in Valencia and the consistency and variety of foodstuffs also indicates the queen's prestige. An analysis of the accounts of 1403 describes how at stake "was the image that the queen projected to her guests, and in general to her subjects; food and the general levels of display that went with it on a daily basis were among the principal elements of prestige available to her." Valencian agriculture was able to provide a wide variety of food to the city's market. But even as Maria de Luna travelled to smaller locations during the year of 1403, the court was still able to provide a plethora of food to the household. This suggests that suppliers could have been following Maria de Luna as she travelled.

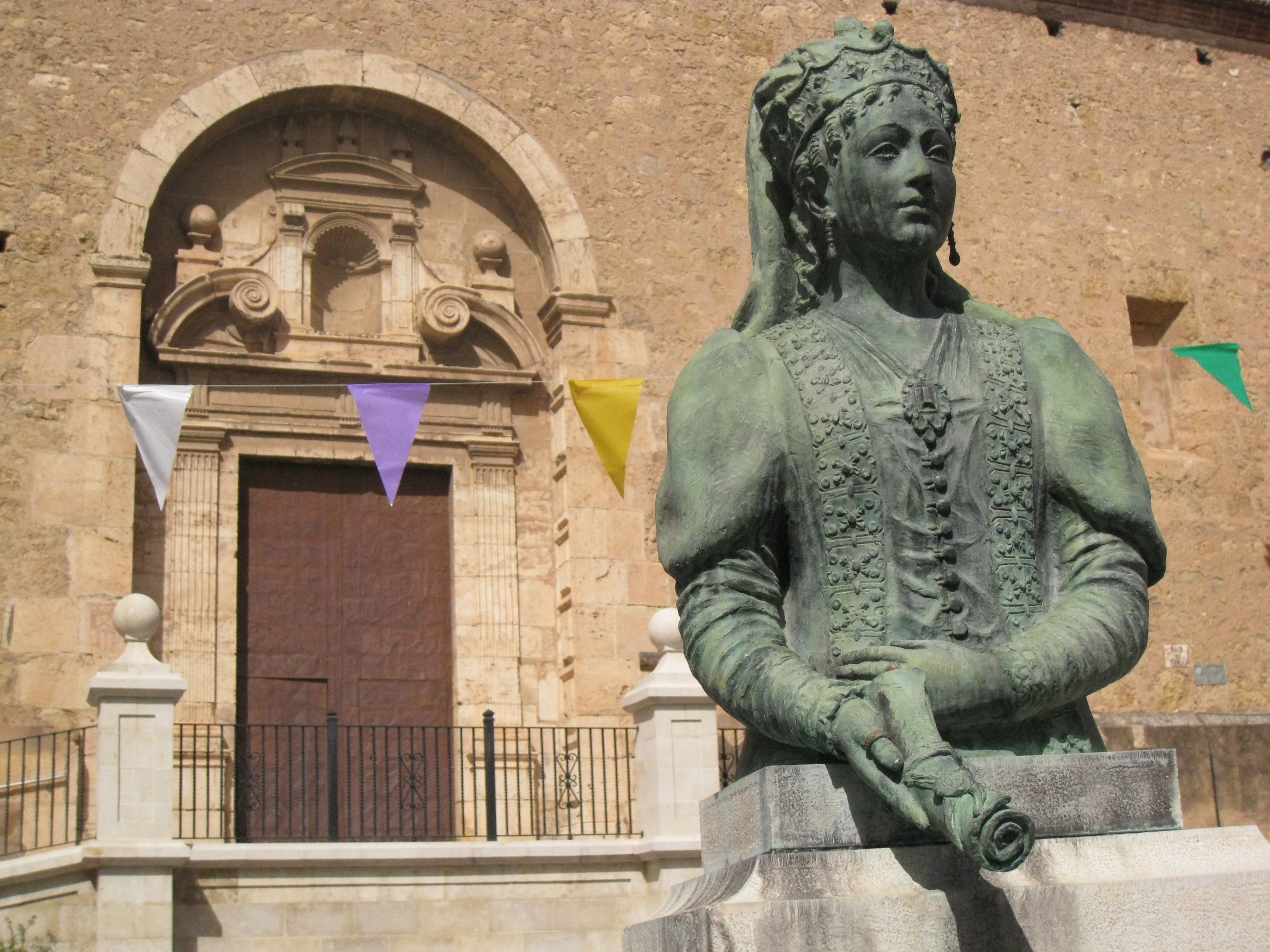
Statue of Maria de Luna outside the Church of St. Martin, Segorbe

== Political policy ==
=== Policy towards minorities ===
In 1398, María de Luna gained control over seven Jewish and six Muslim communities, and assumed responsibility for the aljama, the official legal term for the minority group encompassing both Muslims and Jews. She exercised power over the Jews of Morvedre, a community 20 kilometers north of Valencia, making policies that helped this community recover from turmoil. Morvedre had been the target of a number of violent attacks and massacres. In November 1348, troops from the Union of Valencia invaded it, and it was attacked once more by rebels who were fighting against King Peter III. From the winter of 1363 to March 1365, Castilian troops occupied the town, and the Jewish population of the entire kingdom of Aragon was vulnerable in 1391, when the Dominican preacher Vincent Ferrer incited violence against Jews, while King Fernando I supported existing efforts to convert Jews.

As the Jewish community of Morvedre was getting back on its feet after the crises of 1391, it faced financial difficulties due to the high number of refugees that flowed in. María de Luna chose not to impose the higher rate of taxation that King Peter III had originally established, allowing them to pay only a quarter of the amount, as King John I had done beforehand. María also used her royal power in 1401 to prevent the jurats, the local authorities, from taxing the Jewish community. The local authorities attempted to levy a property tax on Jewish assets, even though Jews had historically been paying their taxes directly to the monarchs.

María once more swam against the tide of the jurats' public opinion in 1403, when her husband Martin passed a law that would force Jews in the kingdom to wear large badges of both yellow and red. María rejected this measure, ensuring that it would not be enforced in Morvedre or in Onda, a place where many Jews conducted trade. Although the Jews had been obligated to wear red badges since John I mandated it in 1396, these had been smaller and much more inconspicuous than the proposed new badge, which was intended to clearly set the Jews apart from the Christians.

María de Luna's Jewish policy appears to have been motivated both by material interests and by more general concerns for the Jewish population. When María realized that Jacob Façan, a Jew who had provided much monetary assistance to the throne, was being investigated for unfaithfulness to the Catholic religion, she intervened to protect him. In an attempt to mitigate the effects of inquisitions, she originally tried to use a bargaining tactic, recognizing that some Jews might indeed deserve punishment, but rather trying to regulate the forms of investigation to which they were subject. María's stance towards inquisitors did not stop them all from trying to prosecute Jews, however, and when a case arose against Jewish women who supposedly had renounced their prior conversion to Catholicism, she forced the bishop who had imprisoned the women to let them go. Her analysis of the matter led her to realize that the case had been allowed to go on for too long and that it violated her previous statement of values: that "our rights and our vassals...will remain whole".

=== Economic policy ===
When Martin joined María in May 1397, she stepped down from her position as lieutenant of Aragon, but she continued to play an active role in her position as queen consort. In 1402, she sought to end the exploitation of the remença, the rural Catalonian peasantry by their aristocratic overlords, decrying such practices as "bad habits" (malos usos). María de Luna unsuccessfully sought the support of Pope Benedict XIII in this matter.

== Recognition and legacy ==
In the 1390s, the Franciscan theologian Francesc Eiximenis adapted his previous work, the Llibre de les dones, for Maria de Luna, and composed for her the Scala Dei ("Ladder of God"), a devotional text accompanied by a set of prayers written in Catalan (with some notes in Latin) and presented to her shortly after she became queen. Eiximenis did not just have a literary influence of Maria de Luna. Around thirty years older than her, he knew her from the time she was a child and acted as a paternal figure for Maria and Marti. He never served as an official counselor, but he was an executor o Maria's will and testament.

The Scala Dei includes the Ten Commandments, essays on the virtues of femininity and queenship, the seven deadly sins, a treatise on penance, and a treatise on contemplation. Eiximenis hoped that the Scala Dei would attract the Crown of Aragon to the reform movement of Observant Franciscanism, which was then in its beginnings. Maria de Luna's reputation during her ascent to the throne sharply contrasted with that of Violant de Bar, whom the Franciscans saw as "overly frivolous, too French, and scandalously neglectful of the affairs of the state". Maria de Luna likely requested two copies of the Scala Dei for herself, one in 1397 and one in 1404. As Eiximenis explained in the dedicatory preface to his work:

Most High Lady, many times your great Ladyship has encouraged me, for the improvement of your spiritual life, to prepare as you request some little book from which you might derive some guidance or light to better guard you from any offence to God, and that you might most aptly enjoy in all virtue, and better please God: for which, Most High Lady, I—wishing to satisfy your pious intentions, and for the sound increase of your devotion—have assembled the following book.

The structure and message of the Scala Dei reflect broader traditions of devotional literature meant for women in the later Middle Ages. "At this time women were considered susceptible to excesses of passion; hence, conduct and devotional literature were intended to calm them and—following Saint Augustine—to redirect the troublesome influences of passions on the body and the mind to more salubrious and pious ends." Eiximenis' views on gender influenced his portrayal of Maria de Luna in the Scala Dei. For Eiximenis, "feminine space was constructed around and limited to the home, the family, and the body", which meant that instead of characterizing her as queen-lieutenant and governor, he placed her in a secondary, dependent role. Queens, Eiximenis believed, have a distinct and secondary status because they are female:

[The queen] owes it to her husband at all times to conserve the peace in the kingdom and ensure swift, righteous, and clear justice to their peoples, and not under any circumstances act as a tyrant, but rather to show herself likable and dear to her people, and take counsel from a small group chosen from among them, and fearing God, and eschewing greed, and who are committed to the common good and not their own affairs.

In keeping with other late medieval devotional texts, Eiximenis' dictates that "the queen is to pray with humility, to kiss the ground before the image of Christ, to kneel, and to look at him with humility and reverence. Praying alone in a private room or chapel, at night or early in the morning, served not only to underline the humility and authenticity of devotion, but quite simply to ensure that she would not be interrupted."

Nuria Silleras-Fernandez, in Chariots of Ladies, suggests that the Scala Dei, and Maria de Luna's personal relationship with Eiximenis more generally, substantially shaped her queenship and subsequent reputation. Ultimately, she did launch the Observant Franciscan movement in the region of her domain. Silleras-Fernandez argues that "Eiximenis inspired Maria to cultivate became the kernel of her royal persona, or, as she preferred to call it in her letters, her 'queenly dignity' (dignitat reginal)." Furthermore, he "coached her on how to project an image that enabled her to exercise power without upsetting contemporary sensibilities regarding gender roles."

== Issue ==
Maria and Martin had four children; three of them died in childhood:

- Martin I of Sicily
- James (b. 1378)
- John (b. 1380)
- Margaret (b. 1384/1388)

== Bibliography ==
- Garcia Marsilla, J. (2018). Food in the accounts of a travelling lady: Maria de Luna, queen of Aragon, in 1403. Journal of Medieval History, 44 (5), 569–594.
- Meyerson, Mark. "Defending their Jewish Subjects: Elinor of Sicily, Maria de Luna, and the Jews of Morvedre". Queenship and Political Power in Medieval and Modern Europe. Ed. Theresa Earenfight. Burlington: Ashgate, 2005. 78–90. Print.
- Planas, Josefina. "La Paz de las Plegarias." e-Spania Revue interdisciplinaire d’études hispaniques médiévales et modernes.
- Silleras-Fernández, Núria. Fit for a Queen: The Scala Dei, Franciscan Queenship, and Maria de Luna (Barcelona, c. 1396—1410). (2015). In Chariots of Ladies: Francesc Eiximenis and the Court of Culture of Medieval and Early Modern Iberia (p. 98). Ithaca; London: Cornell University Press.
- Silleras-Fernández, Núria. Power, Piety, and Patronage in Late Medieval Queenship: Maria de Luna. Palgrave Macmillan, 2008.
- Silleras-Fernández, Núria. "Spirit and Force: Politics, Public, and Private in the Reign of Maria de Luna". Queenship and Political Power in Medieval and Modern Europe. Ed. Theresa Earenfight. Burlington: Ashgate, 2005. 78–90. Print.

Royal titles
| Preceded by Violant of Bar | Queen consort of Aragon, Majorca, Valencia and Countess consort of Barcelona; 1396–1406 | Succeeded by Margaret of Prades |
