= John I of Aragon =

King of Aragon from 1387 to 1396

John I
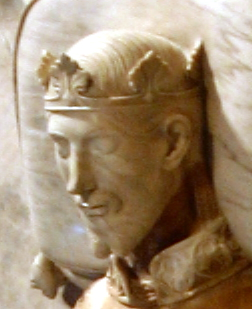
- Tomb effigy

King of Aragon, Valencia, and Majorca Count of Barcelona
- Reign: 6 January 1387 – 19 May 1396
- Predecessor: Peter IV
- Successor: Martin
- Born: 27 December 1350; Perpignan
- Died: 19 May 1396 (aged 45); Foixà
- Burial: Poblet Monastery
- Spouses: Martha of Armagnac (m. 1373; died 1378) Violant of Bar (m. 1380)
- Issue among others...: Joanna, Countess of Foix; Yolande, Duchess of Anjou
- House: House of Barcelona
- Father: Peter IV of Aragon
- Mother: Eleanor of Sicily
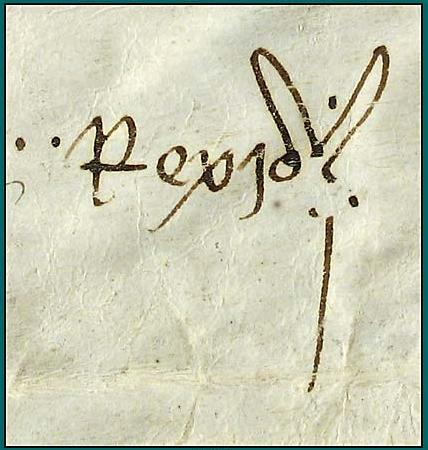
- Signature

John I (27 December 1350 – 19 May 1396), called by posterity the Hunter (Note: Joan el Caçador in Catalan, Chuan lo Cazataire in Aragonese and Juan el Cazador in Castilian) or the Lover of Elegance, (Note: l'Amador de la Gentilesa in Catalan and el Amador de la Gentileza in Castilian) or the Abandoned (Note: el Descurat in Catalan) in his lifetime, was the King of Aragon from 1387 until his death.

== Biography ==
John was the eldest son of Peter IV and his third wife, Eleanor, who was the daughter of Peter II of Sicily. He was born in Perpignan, capital of the Rousillon, which at that time was part of the Principality of Catalonia, in the Crown of Aragon. He was a man of insignificant character, with a taste for verse. He was a Francophile and married Violant of Bar against the wishes of his father, who had wanted him to marry a princess of Sicily. His last marriage was happy. His wife frequently participated in government, since the king was often ill.

Once on the throne, John abandoned his father's relatively Anglophile policy and made an alliance with France. He continued Aragon's support for the Pope of the Avignon line, Clement VII, in the Western Schism. John also made an alliance with Castile, and confirmed in 1388 a treaty with Navarre fixing borders between these kingdoms.

In 1389–90, the Aragonese battled the troops of the Count of Armagnac, John III, who was attempting to conquer the lands of the vassal Kingdom of Majorca. The attack went from Empordà to Girona. The invaders were defeated in 1390 by Aragonese troops commanded by John's brother Martin.

During 1388–90, John gradually lost all lands of the Duchies of Athens and Neopatras in Greece. In 1391, John promulgated legislation on Jews in different cities of the Kingdom of Aragon. Also in 1391, his administration faced a revolt in the vassal kingdom of Sicily, where the population had proclaimed Louis II of Naples as king.

John was a protector of culture of Barcelona. He established in 1393 the Consistory of Barcelona (jocs florals), imitating the same office in Toulouse.

Aragon had been attempting to subjugate Sardinia since the reign of James II, and gradually the Aragonese had conquered most of the island. However, in the 1380s, the remaining independent principality Arborea became a fortress of rebellion and the Aragonese were rapidly driven back by Eleanor de Bas-Serra. The Aragonese continued in John's reign to attempt to suppress rebels in Sardinia and regain lost territories. However, during John's reign, practically the whole of Sardinia was lost.

John's reign was characterized by disastrous financial administration.

He died during a hunt in forests near Foixà by a fall from his horse. Leaving no sons, he was succeeded by his younger brother Martin.

== Family and children ==
From his first marriage on 24 June 1373 to Martha of Armagnac (18 February 1347 - 23 October 1378), daughter of Count Jean I of Armagnac:

- James (Valencia, 24 June 1374 - Valencia, 22 August 1374)
- Joanna (Daroca, October 1375 - Valencia, September 1407), who married on 4 June 1392 at Barcelona to Mathieu, Count of Foix. Together they claimed the throne of Aragon after her father's death. Matthew of Foix invaded Aragonese territories, but was driven back by the new King Martin. Joanna died soon after, childless.
- John (Barcelona, 23 July 1376 – 24/31 July 1376)
- Alfonso (9 September 1377 – 1377)
- Eleanor (Zaragoza, 13 July 1378 – Zaragoza, 1378)

From his second marriage on 2 February 1380 to Yolande of Bar (c. 1365 - 3 July 1431), daughter of Robert I, Duke of Bar and Marie of Valois:

- James (22 March 1382 – 1 September 1388), Duke of Girona and Count of Cervera
- Yolande (Zaragoza 1384 - Saumur 14 November 1442), married on 2 December 1400 to Louis II of Naples
- Ferdinand (18 March 1389 - Monzón, October 1389), Duke of Girona and Count of Cervera
- Antonia (1391 – 1392)
- Eleanor (2 January 1393 – July 1393)
- Peter (13 January 1394 – January 1394), Duke of Girona and Count of Cervera
- Joanna (12 January – 4 August 1396)

== In popular culture ==
- John I is portrayed by actor Lolo Herrero in the 2022 Spanish television series, Heirs to the Land.

== Sources ==
- Bisson, Thomas N. (1986). The Medieval Crown of Aragon: A Short History. Clarendon Press.
- Lanz, Eukene Lacarra, ed. (2002). Marriage and Sexuality in Medieval and Early Modern Iberia. Routledge.
- Matilla, Enrique Rodríguez-Picavea (1999). La Corona de Aragón (in Spanish). Ediciones Akal, S.A.
- O'Callaghan, Joseph F. (1975). A History of Medieval Spain. Cornell University Press.
- Previte-Orton, C.W. (1960). The Shorter Cambridge Medieval History. Vol. The Twelfth Century to the Renaissance. Cambridge at the University Press.
- Gómez, Maricarmen: "Música y corte a fines del Medioevo: el episodio del Sur", in Historia de la música en España e Hispanoamérica 1. De los orígenes hasta c. 1470. Madrid-México D.F., Fondo de Cultura Económica, 2009. ISBN 978-84-375-0638-8

John I of Aragon House of Barcelona Cadet branch of the House of Barcelona Born: 27 December 1350 Died: 19 May 1396
Regnal titles
Preceded by Peter IV	King of Aragon, Valencia, Majorca, Sardinia and Corsica; Count of Barcelona, Roussillon and Cerdagne; 1387–1396	Succeeded by Martin
Preceded by Peter IV	Duke of Athens; 1387–1388	Succeeded by Nerio I Acciaioli
Preceded by Peter IV	Duke of Neopatria; 1387–1390	Succeeded by Nerio I Acciaioli
