= Violant of Bar =

Queen of Aragon from 1387 to 1396

- Tomb effigy at Poblet Monastery

Queen consort of Aragon, Valencia, Majorca, and Sardinia and Corsica; Countess consort of Barcelona
- Tenure: 1387–1395
- Born: c. 1365; Northern France
- Died: 3 July 1431; Barcelona, Principality of Catalonia
- Spouse: John I of Aragon
- Issue Detail: Yolande, Queen of Naples
- House: House of Montbéliard
- Father: Robert, Duke of Bar
- Mother: Marie of Valois

Violant of Bar (c. 1365 – 3 July 1431) was Queen of Aragon by marriage to King John I of Aragon. She was active in matrimonial politics and served as regent of Aragon in the name of her spouse from 1388 until 1395.

== Life ==
Violant was the daughter of Robert I, Duke of Bar and Marie of Valois. Violante was the eighth of eleven children. She was married in 1380 at the age of 15 to John, Duke of Girona, the heir apparent to the throne of Aragon, thus becoming Duchess of Girona and Countess of Cervera.

Violant's husband became King of Aragon in 1387. He was often ill, and Violant wielded considerable administrative power on his behalf: in 1388, she was queen-lieutenant and governed Aragon as such for seven years. She transformed the Aragonese court into a center of French culture. She especially cultivated the talents of Provençal troubadours (poet-musicians). After John died in 1396, Violant announced that she was pregnant, but her sister-in-law, Maria de Luna, wasted no time in declaring herself queen-lieutenant while her husband was defending Sicily. Maria put Violant under constant watch to make sure that there were no subsequent pregnancies. Maria proceeded to then arrest all of Violant's closest allies, and eventually expelling her from the royal castle. Maria immediately sent out some propaganda disparaging Violant and painted herself as something of a savior of Aragon.

After John's death in 1395, she dedicated herself to the education of her only surviving child, Yolande. Yolande and her sons claimed the Crown of Aragon after John's death.

Violant died in Barcelona on 3 July 1431 at the age of sixty-six.

=== Context ===
During the fourteenth century, part of a woman's identity was what man she was attached to, whether that was her father, husband, or even father-in-law or brother. Royal women had more opportunities to use these connections to have their own access to politics, power, and autonomy that most other women could only dream of. Scholars from the Middle Ages have put many women in a bad view, claiming that women are vain, lustful, weak, irrational, instable, immoral, frivolous, deceitful, and capricious, although women were often entrusted with important duties such as managing the estate and raising the children. If women had their intelligence acknowledged, it would be spun to make them out to be cunning and devious.

Since royal women were more known about, they endured more criticism, but at the same time they had more important, often political, duties such as attending political conferences and advising decisions in matrimonial politics. As Queen of Aragon, Violant of Bar would have been expected to travel with King John and participate in the Parliamentary Councils in Aragon. It was also expected, and common to see the Queen active in her role of politics and to perform her duties within the household. Queenship was a little different in Iberia than the rest of Europe, since the queen had so many political, as well as domestic duties. Many philosophers and writers have likened the role of queenship in Iberia to that of the Queen piece in chess, since both run around all over the place, performing many tasks, using advantages and minimizing weaknesses.

Although women commonly endured criticism, they were a pivotal figure in the family structure, as women would serve as a guardian of a child, inherit assets and had the freedom to donate assets to other family members. It was not uncommon that women would interact with money as both creditors and debtors, and some women managed several investments that included their property, as well as their husbands and children's property.

== Politics ==
=== Matrimonial politics ===
Violant of Bar's marriage to Duke John was not well received by his father, King Pere III, who wanted John to marry his granddaughter, Maria, Queen of Sicily, to reunite the two polities. John refused to marry his half-niece, and in retaliation King Pere III and his wife failed to show up to the marriage ceremony and reception. Violant was chosen by John because he was a Francophile, and he used her as a political pawn as a way to strengthen ties between Aragon and France, and also as a way for the Aragonese crown to support the Avignon Papacy. She also had no real alternative to the proposal, as it was a guaranteed way to be protected and provided for, and she would still have contact with her family even if she had a low probability to ever see them again. Marrying John was also an opportunity for her to gain power as the wife of a duke (and later a king) and as a mother to children who would also have to be used in the game of matrimonial politics.

Despite having no choice of who she married, Violant played a big role in the marriage of her children, servants, and vassals. Monarchs had a hand in the marriages of their subordinates since anyone they were married to would be an ally in any potential conflict. Violant made sure the marriages were suitable to all parties, as she knew that if the marriages were suitable, then the political relationship would be strengthened through appreciation as well as marriage. She used her influence on treasurers dragging their feet on paying dowries, noble cousins to bless marriages, and even parties of the marriage on finalizing the marriage by threatening to withdraw from the union.

=== Within the family ===
Violant took special care when arranging the marriages of her family members. In 1382, she wrote to her parents to allow her to input her and her husband's thoughts before arranging the marriage of her sister. Since this was two years after Violant's controversial marriage, she wanted her to marry someone in the Aragonese royalty so her family would get more prestige in the court. This marriage would also make the connections stronger between the families and between Aragon and France.

Juan I of Castile and Violant often wrote back and forth about the marriage. First in 1384 when the bishop of Osuna appeared in Aragon, sent by Juan to suggest the marriage of Juan's youngest son to Violant's stepdaughter, Joanna. Knowing that the youngest son would never inherit the title of King, Violant told her husband that the marriages would not be reasonable, and the families honor would be at stake. Violant made a countersuggestion that Joanna be married to Juan's eldest son, Enrique III. At the same time Joanna's future was being negotiated, Juan and Violant were negotiating about her daughter, Violant of Aragon. Juan offered to have Violant of Aragon marry the youngest son of the duke of Anjou. As this was an identical marriage offer as with Joanna, there was a counteroffer made that Violant of Aragon marry the eldest son of the duke of Anjou. Neither Juan or Violant were willing to capitulate to the other, so neither wedding happened. Then in 1388, Juan wanted to marry Joan's sister to his brother Fadrique, duke of Benavente, to which Violant agreed.

In early 1389, the viscount of Rocaberti wrote to Violant with information that the duke of Turaine had become divorced. Violant responded to the viscount to start arranging the marriage of the duke and Joanna. This marriage would fortify the already strong relationship between John and King Charles IV of France, who would then become inseparable. Unfortunately, Violant was unable to successfully arrange the marriage despite her best efforts.

There was an offer from King of England to marry one of their daughters, but it was never arranged because of Violant's loyalty to her cousin, Charles IV, who told her to not arrange the marriage because they were enemies.

In 1392 Violant brokered a marriage for Joanna with Mateu, count of Foix and viscount of Castellbo, further strengthening the connection between Aragon and France. In the same year, Violant married her daughter to Louis II of Anjou, who was the King of Naples. This put her in a position of political and strategic power as Queen of Naples.

Only one son of Violant and John, Jaime (James), was able to have marriage plans. Born in 1384, he was their only heir and named Dauphin at the age of four. The marriage agreement was with Carlos III of Navarre. Violant requested to have the Navarrian princess sent to her, which was refused. Violant then threatened to block the marriage. Unfortunately, the Dauphin died in 1388.

== Valencia Pogrom ==
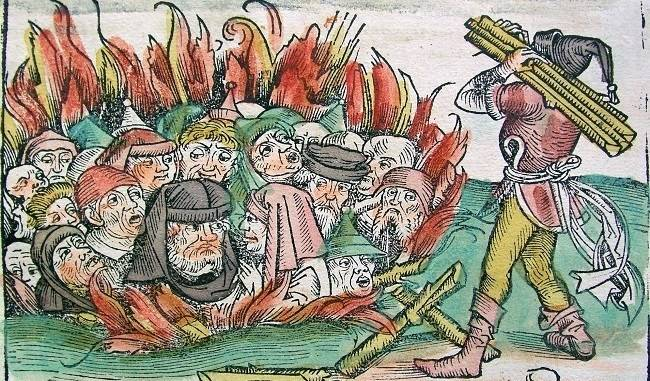
Many Sephardic Jews suffered at the hands of Christians in 1391

In Valencia, a riot broke out against the Jewish population in July 1391. Both Violant and her husband have been criticized about their lack of involvement in ending the violence, since the extent of their involvement was when Violant wrote a letter to the officials in Valencia to increase the defense of the Jewish population almost a month before the violence started. Violant's brother-in-law was stationed in Valencia during this time, so he was chosen to calm the rioters. Later, when Duke Martí requested King Joan's assistance, he was denied. He then tried to appeal to Violant to change his mind, but she refused due to constitutional reasons, not personal reasons.

This pogrom was in the middle of the Reconquista and was not an isolated incident. As many Sephardic Jews converted to Christianity, either willingly or by force, many other Jewish people were left questioning why their friends, families, teachers, and rabbis were seemingly abandoning their faith. Joshua ha-Lorki, a young Sephardic Jew from Aragon, felt betrayed that Solomon ha-Levi, a rabbi, scholar, and leader in the Jewish community, converted to Christianity. Ha-Lorki wrote an open letter to ha-Levi to find out why, in which he laid out multiple options: moral corruption, the philosophical comfort of Christianity, the thought that the Jews had been exiled by God because of the Passion of Jesus, or the perceived imminence of Christianity.

This pogrom and others within the lands of Aragon have been thought to be an effort to reduce the Black Death, which recurred about every twenty years, since many Christians thought that the plague had swept through Europe as a form of divine retribution. Archeological evidence suggests that the instigators of this pogrom were wealthy, which raises another possible cause. Some historians argue that the pogroms were due to an anti-royalist mood among the population, citing the archeological evidence.

== Issue ==
- James (1382–1388), Duke of Girona and Count of Cervera
- Yolande (Zaragoza 1384 - Saumur 14 November 1442), married on 2 December 1400 at Louis II of Naples.
- Ferdinand (1389 - Monzón October 1389), Duke of Girona and Count of Cervera
- Joanna (1392 - Barcelona 4 August 1396)
- Antonia (born and died 1392)
- Peter (1394–1394), Duke of Girona and Count of Cervera

== Sources ==
- Earenfight, Theresa (2010). The King's Other Body: Maria of Castile and the Crown of Aragon. University of Pennsylvania Press.
- Lanz, Eukene Lacarra, ed. (2002). Marriage and Sexuality in Medieval and Early Modern Iberia. Routledge.
- McGlynn, Sean; Woodacre, Elena, eds. (2014). The Image and Perception of Monarchy in Medieval and Early Modern Europe. Cambridge Scholars Publishing.
- Prince, Dawn E. (1994). "A Reappraisal of the Correspondence of Violant de Bar (1365-1431)". Catalan Review. 8 (1–2). Liverpool University Press: 295-312. doi:10.3828/CATR.8.1.17.
- Rohr, Zita (2016). "Playing the Catalan: The Rise of the Chess Queen; Queenship and Political Motherhood in Late Medieval Aragon and France". Virtuous or Villainess? The Image of the Royal Mother from the Early Medieval to the Early Modern Era. New York: Palgrave Macmillan US. pp. 173–197. doi:10.1057/978-1-137-51315-1_9. ISBN 978-1-137-51314-4.

Royal titles
| Preceded by Sibila of Fortia | Queen consort of Aragon; 1387–1395 | Succeeded by Maria de Luna |
