= Martin of Aragon =

King of Aragon from 1396 to 1410

Martin
- Depiction from the Book of Privileges of the Valldecrist Charterhouse

King of Aragon, Valencia, and Majorca Count of Barcelona
- Reign: 19 May 1396 – 31 May 1410
- Predecessor: John I
- Successor: Ferdinand I

King of Sicily
- Reign: 25 July 1409 – 31 May 1410
- Predecessor: Martin I
- Successor: Ferdinand I
- Born: 29 July 1356; Girona, Principality of Catalonia
- Died: 31 May 1410 (aged 53); Barcelona, Principality of Catalonia
- Burial: Poblet Monastery
- Spouses: Maria de Luna (m. 1372; died 1406) Margaret of Prades (m. 1409)
- Issue more...: Martin I of Sicily
- House: Barcelona
- Father: Peter IV of Aragon
- Mother: Eleanor of Sicily
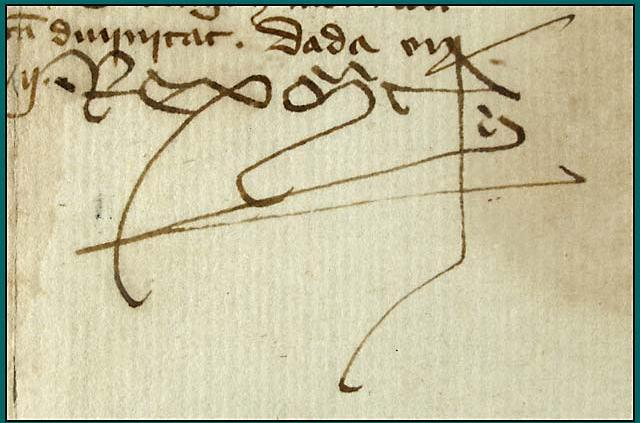
- Signature

Martin the Humane (29 July 1356 – 31 May 1410), also called the Elder and the Ecclesiastic, was King of Aragon, Valencia, Sardinia and Corsica and Count of Barcelona from 1396 and King of Sicily from 1409 (as Martin II). He failed to secure the accession of his illegitimate grandson, Frederic, Count of Luna, and with him the rule of the House of Barcelona came to an end.

== Background ==
Martin was born in 1356, in either Girona or Perpignan, both then in the Principality of Catalonia. He was the second son of King Peter IV of Aragon and Eleanor of Sicily (Leonora), princess of the Sicilian branch of the House of Aragon.

As a cadet prince of the Aragonese royal family, Martin was given the County of Besalú. In Barcelona on 13 June 1372, Martin married María López de Luna (d. Villarreal, 20 December 1406), the daughter and heiress of Lope, Lord and 1st Count of Luna and Lord of Segorbe and his wife Brianda de Got, who was born in Provence and was related to Pope Clement V.

In 1380, his father appointed him lord and regent of the island of Sicily, then known also as Trinacria, since its queen Maria of Sicily, who was also Martin's cousin, was underage (Maria's father, Frederick III the Simple, died in 1377). As a son of Eleanor of Sicily, Martin was himself an heir to the island, should Maria's family die out. Martin's only living son, Martin the Younger, about seventeen years old, was married in 1391 to the Queen of Sicily.

After the marriage, Martin the Younger left Aragon and, having arrived in Palermo, was crowned, together with Maria, becoming King Martin I of Sicily. The Sicilians did not like the Aragonese marriage too much (also because it had been celebrated by the Antipope Clement VII and the Sicilians were supporters of Pope Urban VI and then of Pope Boniface IX) and, led by the Alagona family, rebelled already in 1392 and from that date opposed the Aragonese authority. In the same 1392, Martin the Elder was sent to Sicily at the head of an expedition (which had been organized to intervene in Sardinia, but during the trip it was diverted to Sicily) to help his son, Martin the Younger and Queen Maria. The arrival of Martin the Elder in Sicily led to the conquest of Trapani and Palermo, but he was unable to defeat the opponents, who resisted until 1398, the year in which peace returned and the son and daughter-in-law were able to govern the whole island again.

== Kingship ==
In 1396, Martin succeeded his elder brother John I, who had died sonless, on the throne of Aragon. However, Sicilian nobles were causing unrest and so Martin was kept in Sicily. Meanwhile, Martin's wife, María López de Luna, claimed the throne on his behalf and acted as his representative until he arrived in 1397. Still, the delay opened the way for more problems and quarrels to surface in Aragon. His right to the throne was contested, first by Count Matthew of Foix on behalf of his wife Joanna, elder daughter of John I. However, Martin succeeded in quashing an invasion by troops of the count. After the death of the childless Joanna, John I's younger daughter Yolande of Aragon, who had married the Angevin King Louis II of Naples, continued the claim, as did her sons.

Martin launched crusades against the Moors in North Africa in 1398 and 1399.

Aragon had been trying to subjugate Sardinia since the reign of James II, and gradually the Aragonese had conquered most of the island. However, in the 1380s, during the reign of Martin's father Peter IV, the remaining independent principality of Arborea became a fortress of rebellion and the Aragonese were rapidly driven back by Eleanor of Arborea, so that practically the whole of Sardinia was lost. King Martin sent his son Martin the Younger, by then king of Sicily through his marriage to Queen Maria, to reconquer Sardinia. The son won the Battle of Sanluri (San Luis, San Luigi) in 1409, drove away the Genoese allies of the Sardinians, and subjugated a vast number of Sardinian nobles. This soon caused Arborea's total loss of independence. Soon after the battle, however, Martin the Younger died suddenly, due to malaria. Martin of Aragon then succeeded his son as King of Sicily, taking the title of Martin II.

Overall, the Crown of Aragon enjoyed external peace during Martin's reign and he worked to quell internal strife caused by nobles, factions and bandits. He supported the Avignon line of Popes and Pope Benedict XIII, who was Aragonese, held the seat throughout Martin's reign. Martin's military intervention rescued the imprisoned Benedict in 1403 from the clutches of his rivals and the Pope settled in Valencia's countryside.

The Aragonese royal arms with the Crest of Saint George and the Dragon from the Inventory of King Martin

== Issue ==
Martin had four legitimate children by Queen Maria: Martin the Younger (b. 1374/1376), James (b. 1378), John (b. 1380), and Margaret (b. 1384/1388). The three younger children all died early, and so after Martin the Younger's death, King Martin appointed his cousin James II, Count of Urgell, the closest legitimate agnate of the House of Barcelona, as Governor-General of all the kingdoms of Aragon, a position that belonged traditionally to the heir presumptive. Martin still married secondly on 17 September 1409 to his cousin Margaret of Prades, daughter of Peter of Aragon, Baron of Entenza, but the short marriage was childless.

== Succession ==
Martin died, in the monastery of Valldonzella, outside the city walls of Barcelona on 31 May 1410. While the reason remains unclear, it is supposed that the cause was either plague (present in the area at the time), uremic coma (the king suffered from severe obesity that affected his health) or the possibility of having been poisoned, only supported by Renaissance chronicler Lorenzo Valla. The story of the king's death associated with laughter (following a joke told by Borra the jester while Martin was suffering from indigestion) although lacking in historical evidence, has been recorded. Despite the demands to have an heir declared, the physical incapacity of the king prevented him from giving a clear name, and to the question of giving permission to give to the throne to the person who would be most legitimate for it, he gave a terse "Hoc" (Yes).

All of Martin's legitimate descendants, born of his marriage with Queen Maria, were already dead, and his second marriage did not produce any children. Only an illegitimate grandson, Frederick, Count of Luna, a natural son of Martin the Younger, and an illegitimate daughter – ineligible for succession due to the rules established during the reign of James I of Aragon – continued the direct line of inheritance. The king, despite his desire and some effort, was unable to obtain sufficient confirmation of Frederick as his successor prior to his death. As a result, Martin's death led to a two-year interregnum, during which at least five contenders for the throne came forward, including Frederick of Luna and James II of Urgell. Succession of the Crown of Aragon was determined by the Compromise of Caspe on 28 June 1412, in which Martin's nephew Ferdinand, infante of Castile, was chosen as the next king, establishing the House of Trastámara.

== Sources ==
- Bisson, Thomas N. (1986). The Medieval Crown of Aragon: A Short History. Clarendon Press. ISBN 0-19-821987-3.
- Earenfight, Theresa (2016). "Partners in Politics". In Earenfight, Theresa (ed.). Queenship and Political Power in Medieval and Early Modern Spain. Routledge.

Martin of Aragon House of Aragon Cadet branch of the House of Barcelona Born: 29 July 1356 Died: 31 May 1410
Regnal titles
Preceded by John I	King of Aragon, Valencia, Majorca, Sicily, Sardinia and Corsica; Count of Barcelona, Roussillon and Cerdagne; 1396–1410	Vacant Title next held by Ferdinand I
Preceded by Martin I	King of Sicily; 1409–1410	Vacant Title next held by Ferdinand I
Spanish nobility
New title	Duke of Montblanc; 1387–1396	Vacant Title next held by John of Trastámara
