= James Fadrique =

- Count of Salona, Lord of Loidoriki, Vitrinitsa, Aegina, Zetouni, Siderokastron

Count of Salona
- Reign: 1355–1366
- Predecessor: Peter Fadrique
- Successor: Boniface Fadrique
- Died: 1366
- Noble family: of Barcelona
- Issue: Louis Fadrique
- Father: Alfonso Fadrique
- Mother: Marulla of Verona

James Fadrique was a Catalan nobleman who became Count of Salona, as well as Lord of various other towns in Central Greece from ca. 1355 until his death in 1366.

== Biography ==
James was a son of Alfonso Fadrique, vicar-general of Athens and Neopatras, and Marulla of Verona.

As the Papacy supported the claims of Walter VI of Brienne on the Duchy of Athens, James (along with his father and his brother Peter) was among the Catalan leaders excommunicated on 29 December 1335 by William Frangipani, Latin Archbishop of Patras. In accordance with their father's will, James succeeded in the domains of his older brother Peter—the County of Salona, the baronies of Loidoriki, Veteranitsa, and perhaps Zetouni—after the latter died childless sometime before 1355. These possessions had been confiscated by the Crown of Aragon a few years before, but James was apparently successful in securing their return through the mediation of an embassy sent by the Catalan lords of Greece to King Frederick III. The same embassy petitioned to remove the incumbent vicar-general, Raymond Berardi, and to install James in his stead, but it is unclear whether this request was granted. If James was made vicar-general, by 1359 he had lost the position to Gonsalvo Ximénez of Arenós.

In 1361–62, James faced the hostility of the new vicar-general, Peter of Pou, who seized the castles of Salona, Loidoriki, and Veteranitsa, before he was killed in an uprising in 1362. In 1365, James seized the fortress of Siderokastron from the marshal Ermengol de Novelles, who had been declared rebel for refusing to surrender it to the appointed vicar-general, Matthew of Moncada. James then kept the castle for himself. James died in 1366, and was succeeded by his son Louis at Zetouni and Siderokastron. James had also willed to his brother "all his rights and properties" in the Duchy of Athens, including Salona, Loidoriki, and Veteranitsa. James also gave the island of Aegina to Boniface, who granted it to his son Peter. Boniface and Louis soon were at odds, and after a brief armed conflict in ca. 1375 Louis emerged victorious and dispossessed his uncle and cousin.

== Sources ==
- Miller, William (1908). The Latins in the Levant: A History of Frankish Greece (1204–1566). London: John Murray.
- Setton, Kenneth M. (1975). "The Catalans in Greece, 1311–1388". In Setton, Kenneth M.; Hazard, Harry W. (eds.). A History of the Crusades, Volume III: The Fourteenth and Fifteenth Centuries. Vol. 3. Madison and London: University of Wisconsin Press. pp. 167–224. ISBN 0-299-06670-3.

Vacant Domains confiscated by the Crown of Aragon Title last held by Peter Fadrique	Count of Salona, Lord of Loidoriki and Veteranitsa; 1355–1366	Succeeded by Boniface Fadrique
Preceded by John Fadrique	Lord of Aegina unknown	Succeeded by Boniface Fadrique
Preceded by Ermengol de Novelles	Castellan of Siderokastron; 1365–1366	Succeeded by Louis Fadrique
