= Helena Asanina Kantakouzene =

Regent of the Lordship of Salona from 1382 to 1394

Regent of Salona
- Regency: 1382 - 1394
- Lady Regnant: Maria Fadrique
- Died: after 1394; Edirne, Ottoman Sultanate(?)
- Spouse: Louis Fadrique (m. 1368; died 1382)
- Issue: Maria Fadrique
- Father: Matthew Kantakouzenos
- Mother: Irene Palaiologina

Helena Asanina Kantakouzene (died after 1394) was regent of the Lordship of Salona in Frankish Greece from 1382 until its conquest by the Ottoman Empire in 1394 on behalf of her daughter Maria Fadrique.

== Life ==
Helena was one of the younger daughters of Matthew Kantakouzenos and Irene Palaiologina. She was known to be living with her mother and sister Maria in Gratianopolis (modern Gratini), when Emperor John V Palaiologos moved the women to Tenedos. In 1361 she went with her father Matthew to live in the Morea, where she afterwards married Louis Fadrique, Count of Salona, lord of Zetouni and lord of Aegina. When he died in 1382, she continued to reign as Dowager Countess of Salona.

When Helena was threatened by the alliance of her cousin Theodore I Palaiologos, Despot of the Morea, and Nerio I Acciaioli, Duke of Athens, she sought the help of Stephen of Pharsalos, the younger son of Simeon Uroš, Despot of Epirus. In April 1388, King John I of Aragon offered her the rights of castellan over Athens on the condition she would defend the city.

She had only one child, Maria Fadrique Kantakouzene, by her husband Louis Fadrique, who was born around 1370. Maria, whom Laonikos Chalkokondyles describes as very beautiful, was much sought after in marriage. Her first betrothal, around 1382, was to Bernaduch, a son of Philip Dalmau, Viscount of Rocaberti, and next to an unidentified son of Simeon Uroš, whom Donald Nicol suggests was Stephen of Pharsalos. This arrangement came close to being consummated with a marriage, for King Peter IV of Aragon wrote to Helena on 17 August 1386 and reproached her for marrying her daughter to a foreigner. In any case, negotiations for her marriage to Bernaduch of Rocaberti resumed in 1387. Nerio Acciaioli is said to have sought her hand for his brother-in-law Pietro Saraceno, but in 1390 arrangements appear to have been made for Maria to marry Matthew of Moncada, son of William Raymond of Montcada, Count of Augusta.

Chalkokondyles tells how Salona was captured by the Ottoman Sultan Bayezid I, and that afterwards both Helena and her daughter Maria entered the Sultan's harem, where the latter died in 1395 or 1394 According to a letter from Nerio Acciaioli to his brother Donato dated 20 February 1394, the capture of Salona can be dated either at the end of 1393 or the beginning of 1394. Helena was also sent to Edirne as a prisoner, and her subsequent life is unknown.

== Sources ==
- Nicol, Donald M. (1968). The Byzantine Family of Kantakouzenos (Cantacuzenus), ca. 1100–1460: A Genealogical and Prosopographical Study. Dumbarton Oaks studies 11. Washington, DC: Dumbarton Oaks Center for Byzantine Studies.
