= Berenguer Estanyol =

Berenguer Estanyol d'Empúries (Spanish: Estañol de Ampurias) was the vicar general of the Duchy of Athens for four years from 1312 to 1316. He was sent there by Frederick II of Sicily to rule on behalf of his five-year-old son Manfred, who was installed as per the request of the Catalan Company.

Berenguer arrived in Piraeus in 1312 with five Sicilian galleys to relieve Roger Deslaur of the government. Berenguer was an able governor who strengthened the Catalan hold on Attica and Boeotia. He had to fight the Venetians of Negroponte, the Byzantine Greeks of Thessaly (especially the Doukai of Neopatria), the Franks of the Argolid, where the Brienne cadet branch of Foucherolles was empowered. He was successful in his endeavours before he sank into a severe illness which lasted long before he finally succumbed in 1316. He was succeeded as vicar general by Alfonso Fadrique.

== Sources ==
- Miller, William (1908). The Latins in the Levant: A History of Frankish Greece (1204–1566). London: John Murray.
- Setton, Kenneth M. (1975). "The Catalans in Greece, 1311–1388". In Setton, Kenneth M.; Hazard, Harry W. (eds.). A History of the Crusades, Volume III: The Fourteenth and Fifteenth Centuries. Vol. 3. Madison and London: University of Wisconsin Press. pp. 167–224. ISBN 0-299-06670-3.

New title	Vicar-general of the Duchy of Athens; 1312–1316	Succeeded by Alfonso Fadrique
