= Boniface Fadrique =

Catalan nobleman (died 1380)

- Count of Salona, Lord of Karystos and Aegina

Count of Salona
- Reign: 1366–1375
- Predecessor: James Fadrique
- Successor: Louis Fadrique
- Died: 1380
- Noble family: of Barcelona
- Spouse: Dulcia
- Issue: Peter; John
- Father: Alfonso Fadrique
- Mother: Marulla of Verona

Boniface Fadrique was a Catalan nobleman active in Central Greece as lord of Karystos from 1359 until 1365 and then as Count of Salona and owner of various other fiefs in the Duchy of Athens from 1366 until his defeat in a conflict with his nephew Louis Fadrique in the late 1370s.

Boniface was the son of Alfonso Fadrique, vicar-general of the Duchy of Athens and the Duchy of Neopatras, and of Marulla of Verona, daughter of the baron of Karystos, Boniface of Verona. When Alfonso Fadrique died in 1338, Boniface inherited his mother's barony of Karystos and various other possessions across Attica. He remained in Sicily until 1359, when he came to Greece to claim them. In 1365 however he sold his barony of Karystos with all its possessions, including serfs, to Venice, which had long coveted it, for 6,000 ducats.

James Fadrique had also willed to his brother "all his rights and properties" in the Duchy of Athens, including the County of Salona with Loidoriki and Veteranitsa, but not Zetounion and Siderokastron, which passed to James' son Louis Fadrique. James also gave the island of Aegina to Boniface, who granted it to his son Peter. When James died in 1366, this left Boniface and his nephew Louis as the two most powerful lords in the Catalan domains. The two got on badly, as Louis challenged the cession of his father's domains to Boniface. Louis prevailed in the dispute: in 1375 he was recognized by Frederick III of Sicily as vicar-general of Athens and Neopatras, and in a clash between Louis and Boniface soon after, the former prevailed. Boniface's son Peter was sent to exile and imprisonment in Aragon, Louis confiscated their domains, while Boniface himself died sometime before September 1380. On 8 May 1381 Boniface's widow Dulcia and her other son, John, obtained a royal pardon for Boniface as well as the restoration of his confiscated properties from Peter IV of Aragon. It is unclear, however, whether they actually received possession of any of these domains.

== Sources ==
- Miller, William (1908). The Latins in the Levant: A History of Frankish Greece (1204–1566). London: John Murray.
- Setton, Kenneth M. (1975). "The Catalans in Greece, 1311–1388". In Setton, Kenneth M.; Hazard, Harry W. (eds.). A History of the Crusades, Volume III: The Fourteenth and Fifteenth Centuries. Vol. 3. Madison and London: University of Wisconsin Press. pp. 167–224. ISBN 0-299-06670-3.
