= Alfonso Fadrique =

Illegitimate Son of King Frederick II of Sicily

- Count of Malta, Gozo & Salona

Vicar-general of the Duchy of Athens and Neopatras
- Reign: 1317–1330
- Predecessor: Berenguer Estañol
- Successor: Nicholas Lancia
- Born: 1294
- Died: 1338 (aged 43–44)
- Noble family: House of Barcelona
- Spouse: Marulla of Verona
- Issue: Peter Fadrique; James Fadrique; William; Boniface Fadrique; John Fadrique; Simona; Jua
- Father: Frederick III of Sicily
- Mother: Sibilla Sormella

Don Alfonso Fadrique (English: Alfonso Frederick; Catalan: N'Anfós Frederic d'Aragó; died 1338) was the eldest and illegitimate son of Frederick II of Sicily. He served as vicar general of the Duchy of Athens from 1317 to 1330.

He was first proclaimed vicar general by his father in 1317 and sent off to govern Athens on behalf of his younger half-brother Manfred. He arrived in Piraeus with ten galleys later that year, but Manfred had died and was succeeded by another brother, William II. In the year of his arrival, Fadrique married Marulla, the daughter of Boniface of Verona, thus allying himself with the chief lord of Euboea. By this marriage, also, he acquired rights to the castles of Larmena, Karystos, Zetouni, and Gardiki.

Over the next two years, Fadrique warred with the Republic of Venice and stormed the city of Negroponte with Turks after Boniface of Verona died. In 1318, John II Ducas, the sebastokrator of Neopatras, died and Fadrique invaded Thessaly. He took possession of his castles at Zetouni and Gardiki and conquered Neopatras, Siderokastron, Loidoriki, Domokos, and Pharsalus. He conquered the palace of the Ducae at Neopatras and took the title of Vicar General of the Duchy of Neopatras. He built a tower at Neopatras.

In 1330, Alfonso was relieved of his duties as vicar general and replaced by Odo de Novelles. He was compensated with the Sicilian counties of Malta and Gozo. He died in 1338 and left five sons, Peter; James, father of Louis Fadrique; William, lord of Livadeia; Boniface, lord of Aigina, Piada and Karystos; John, lord of Salamina and two daughters, Simona, who wed George II Ghisi and Jua.

== Sources ==
- Backman, Clifford R. (1995). The Decline and Fall of Medieval Sicily: Politics, Religion, and Economy in the reign of Frederick III, 1296-1337. Cambridge University Press.
- Setton, Kenneth M. (1975). "The Catalans in Greece, 1311–1388". In Setton, Kenneth M.; Hazard, Harry W. (eds.). A History of the Crusades, Volume III: The Fourteenth and Fifteenth Centuries. Vol. 3. Madison and London: University of Wisconsin Press. pp. 167–224. ISBN 0-299-06670-3.
- Setton, Kenneth M. Catalan Domination of Athens 1311–1380. Revised edition. Variorum: London, 1975.
- Setton, Kenneth M. (1976). The Papacy and the Levant (1204–1571), Volume I: The Thirteenth and Fourteenth Centuries. Vol. 1. Philadelphia: The American Philosophical Society. ISBN 0-87169-114-0.

Preceded by Berenguer Estañol	Vicar-general of the Duchy of Athens and of the Duchy of Neopatras (after 1319); 1317 – ca. 1330	Succeeded by Nicholas Lancia
Preceded by Roger Deslaur as Lord of Salona	Count of Salona; 1318–1338	Succeeded by Peter Fadrique
