= Peter Fadrique =

Count of Salona

- Count of Salona, Lord of Loidoriki, Vitrinitsa, Aegina

Count of Salona
- Reign: 1338 – 1350/55
- Predecessor: Alfonso Fadrique
- Successor: James Fadrique
- Died: 1355
- Noble family: House of Barcelona
- Father: Alfonso Fadrique
- Mother: Marulla of Verona

Peter (I) Fadrique (died between 1350 and 1355), Count of Salona, was the eldest son of Alfonso Fadrique, vicar general of Athens and Neopatras, and Marulla of Verona.

As the Papacy supported the claims of Walter VI of Brienne on the Duchy of Athens, Peter (along with his father and his brother James) was among the Catalan leaders excommunicated on 29 December 1335 by William Frangipani, Latin Archbishop of Patras. Alfonso died in about 1338, and Peter succeeded his father in the County of Salona, the baronies of Loidoriki, Veteranitsa, Aegina, and perhaps Zetouni.

His possessions were confiscated by the Crown of Aragon sometime between 1350 and Peter's death, which occurred before 1355. The reason for the confiscation is unknown, but after Peter's death, his fiefs were restored to his younger brother James, as had been stipulated by Alfonso in his will. Another brother, John, appears as lord of Aegina (and nearby Salamis) already in 1350.

== Sources ==
- Miller, William (1908). The Latins in the Levant: A History of Frankish Greece (1204–1566). London: John Murray.
- Setton, Kenneth M. (1975). "The Catalans in Greece, 1311–1388". In Setton, Kenneth M.; Hazard, Harry W. (eds.). A History of the Crusades, Volume III: The Fourteenth and Fifteenth Centuries. Vol. 3. Madison and London: University of Wisconsin Press. pp. 167–224. ISBN 0-299-06670-3.

Preceded by Alfonso Fadrique	Count of Salona, Lord of Loidoriki and Veteranitsa; 1338–1350/55	Vacant Domains confiscated by the Crown of Aragon Title next held by James Fadrique
Preceded by Alfonso Fadrique	Lord of Aegina; 1338–1350	Succeeded by John Fadrique as Lord of Aegina and Salamis
