= Boniface of Verona =

Lombard crusader (died 1317 or 1318)

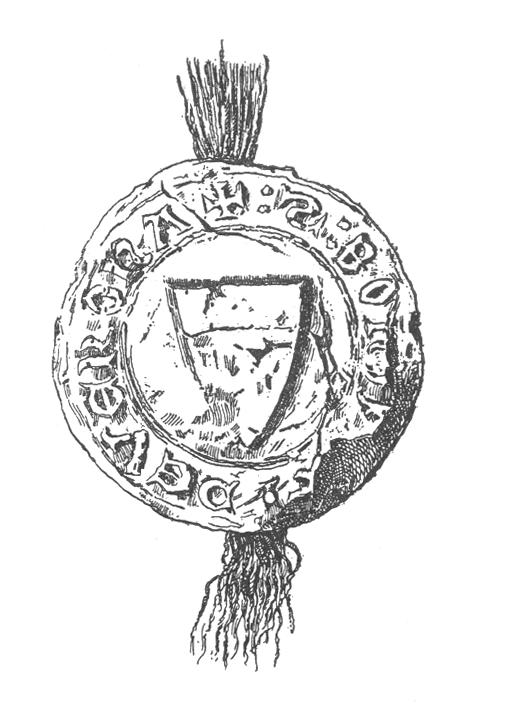
- Seal of Boniface

Lord of Karystos, Gardiki, Aegina and Salamis
- Reign: 1294–1317/18
- Predecessor: Guy II de la Roche (Gardiki and Salamis), Boniface's wife (Karystos and Aegina)
- Successor: Marulla of Verona and Alfonso Fadrique
- Born: c. 1270
- Died: 1317 or 1318
- Noble family: Family of Verona
- Spouse: Agnes de Cicon (?)
- Issue: Marulla, Helen, Thomas
- Father: Francesco of Verona
- Mother: Unknown

Boniface of Verona (Italian: Bonifacio da Verona, died late 1317 or early 1318) was a Lombard lord in Frankish Greece during the late 13th and early 14th century. A third son from a junior branch of his family, he sold his castle to equip himself as a knight, became a protégé of Guy II de la Roche, Duke of Athens, expelled the Byzantines from Euboea in 1296, and advanced to become one of the most powerful lords of Frankish Greece. Following Guy II's death, he served as regent for the Duchy of Athens in 1308–09, and was captured by the Catalan Company in the Battle of Halmyros in March 1311. The Catalans held Boniface in high regard, and offered to make him their leader. Boniface refused, but retained close relations with them, sharing their hostility towards the Republic of Venice and its own interests in Euboea. Boniface died in late 1317 or early 1318, leaving his son-in-law, the Catalan vicar-general Alfonso Fadrique, as the heir of his domains.

== Life ==
Boniface was born probably around 1270, as the son of Francesco of Verona, and grandson of Giberto I of Verona, one of the three original Lombard barons, known as the "triarchs", who divided the island of Negroponte (Euboea) in central Greece between them. Boniface's father, as a younger son, did not inherit his father's triarchy. The identity of Boniface's mother is unknown.

=== Career under Guy II ===
Map of the states of Frankish Greece, c. 1278

Boniface was the youngest of three brothers. He inherited a single castle from his father, which he sold in 1287 in order to arm and equip himself and ten attendants, and went to the court of the Duchy of Athens. There he became a friend and close companion of the under-age Duke of Athens, Guy II de la Roche (born in 1280, he became duke at the age of seven). In June 1294 the ceremony for the coming of age of Guy was celebrated with great splendour at the co-capital of Thebes, and Guy chose Boniface to be the one to knight him. As described in the chronicle of Ramon Muntaner, Boniface stood out by his splendid attire even among the assembled nobility of Frankish Greece, dressed in its finery. As a reward, Guy gave Boniface an annuity of 50,000 sols, conferred on him thirteen castles, including the lordship of Gardiki in southern Thessaly, which Guy had inherited from his mother, and the island of Salamis. Boniface was also wed to a lady, identified as "Agnes de Cicon" by some 19th-century and 20th-century historians, whose dowry included titles to the island of Aegina and of Karystos on the southern tip of Euboea. In addition, the Duke decreed that in the event of his own premature death, Boniface was to become regent.

In 1296, Boniface turned his attention to his home island of Euboea. In the 1270s, most of Euboea had been captured from the Lombards for the Byzantine Empire by a renegade, Licario, but after the latter's departure from the island c. 1280, the Lombards began recovering the forts they had lost. Boniface campaigned against the remaining Byzantine strongholds on the island, which included his wife's inheritance, Karystos. By the end of the year, he had managed not only to recover Karystos, but to expel the Byzantines altogether from the island. This campaign made him the most powerful person in Euboea: in addition to Karystos, which he claimed by right of his wife, he held on to the other forts he had captured, aided by the fact that most of the surviving claimants of the Lombard triarchies were women. At the same time, however, the Republic of Venice increasingly made its presence felt on the island through its colony at the city of Negroponte (Chalkis), and through the rising influence of the local Venetian representative, the bailo.

In 1302 or 1303, following the sudden death of the Greek ruler of Thessaly, Constantine Doukas, the region passed into the hands of his underage son, John II. The regent of Epirus, Anna Palaiologina Kantakouzene, saw an opportunity to annex Thessaly into her state, and invaded its territory, seizing the town of Fanari. Guy II, whom his uncle Constantine Doukas had appointed as steward of John II until he came of age, reacted by quickly mobilizing his vassals, Boniface of Verona among them. According to the Chronicle of the Morea, Boniface joined Guy and the Marshal of the Principality of Achaea, Nicholas III of Saint Omer, with a hundred knights. The large Frankish host impressed Anna, who quickly offered to abandon Fanari in return for peace. Her proposal was accepted, and the Frankish army moved north into Byzantine-controlled lands around Thessalonica, until the Italian-born Empress Yolande of Montferrat, who held the city as her own domain, convinced them to withdraw without further incident. In 1308, Venice accused Boniface, along with Guy II, Anthony le Flamenc, and Bernat de Rocafort, the leader of the Catalan Company, of plotting to seize the Venetian colony of the city of Negroponte, but the sudden death of Guy II on 5 October, without leaving an heir, changed the situation. Boniface served as regent for the duchy until the arrival of the new Duke, Walter of Brienne, in August/September 1309.

=== Battle of Halmyros and aftermath ===
Almost immediately the new Duke was confronted by the threat of the mercenaries of the Catalan Company. Since 1306, the Catalans had been raiding Thessaly from the north. Walter of Brienne now engaged them to fight against John II Doukas, who had turned against the Frankish tutelage and, seeking to make himself independent, joined forces with Epirus and the Byzantines. The Catalans captured and garrisoned more than thirty fortresses around Domokos on Brienne's behalf, but when the Duke tried to cheat them of the promised pay, the Catalans marched on to the duchy itself, invading Boeotia in the winter of 1310–11. In response, Brienne assembled his feudatories and, bolstered by contingents from the Principality of Achaea and the Duchy of the Archipelago, marched to meet them in battle. Boniface also joined the Athenian host, and was a witness to Brienne's last will at Zetounion on 10 March 1311, along with another Euboeote baron, John of Maisy. Five days later, at the Battle of Halmyros, the Frankish army was heavily defeated. The details of the battle are unclear, but the Frankish heavy cavalry charge was apparently impeded by the marshy terrain, allowing the Catalans and their Turkish auxiliaries to prevail. Most of the chivalry of Athens perished alongside their duke. Boniface was among the few lords who were taken captive, his life spared by the Catalans, who considered him their friend.

The Battle of Halmyros shattered the status quo of Frankish Greece: the bulk of the Frankish nobility was dead, and the Duchy of Athens was swiftly and without much resistance taken over by the Catalans. The Catalans were now faced with the task of governing their newly won territories. Lacking a leader of sufficient social standing, at first they turned to Boniface, who was now the most important surviving Frankish noble in the whole of northern Greece, and whom they esteemed greatly; Muntaner described him as "the wisest and most courteous nobleman that was ever born". Fearing reprisals from Venice in Negroponte, and loath to antagonize the rest of Frankish Greece, at a time when the permanence of the Catalan regime was still uncertain, Boniface declined the honour. Consequently, the Catalans instead chose another captive Frankish lord, Roger Deslaur, as their leader. Deslaur served until 1312, when King Frederick III of Sicily named his son Manfred as Duke of Athens, sending a vicar-general to govern the country in his name.

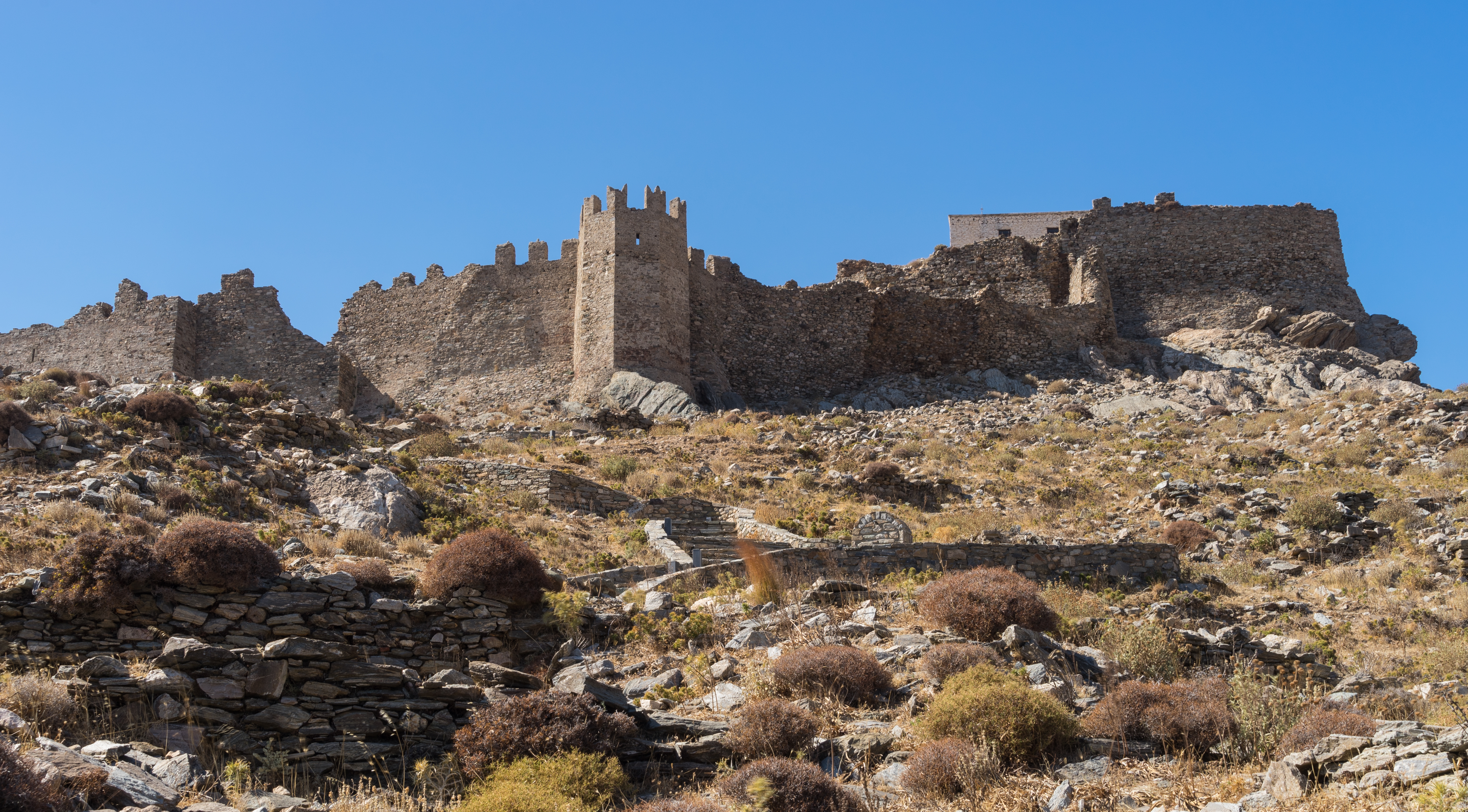
The castle of Karystos in 2016

Nevertheless, during the 1310s Boniface remained one of the most powerful lords of Frankish Greece: he not only controlled most of Euboea, as well as Aegina and Salamis, but was also the wealthiest of the Euboeote lords. His relations with Venice remained strained, as the Republic suspected him of designs to install himself as lord of all Euboea, with Catalan assistance. As a result, the Venetians began fortifying their colony at Chalkis, for which purpose all the local barons, except for Boniface, agreed to contribute money. In addition, Boniface was engaged in disputes with the local Venetian authorities over piracy by some of his subjects against Venetian shipping, which led to the confiscation of goods by the Venetian bailo at Chalkis. In 1317, however, in a dispute between Boniface and the Venetian Andrea Cornaro, ruler of half a triarchy, the Catalans took the side of the latter and supplied 2,000 soldiers to bolster the garrison of Chalkis.

In the same year, the new Catalan vicar-general, Alfonso Fadrique, arrived in Greece. Boniface quickly concluded an alliance with the Catalan leader, marrying his daughter Maria (Marulla) to Fadrique, while virtually dispossessing his other daughter Helen and his son Thomas of their inheritance. Soon after his arrival, Fadrique and his men invaded Euboea and probably conquered most of it. Fadrique possibly intended to install his father-in-law as the island's ruler, but Boniface died in late 1317 or early 1318. Diplomatic pressure from his father, King Frederick III, and a Venetian victory at sea, forced Alfonso to withdraw by the end of 1318. A protracted dispute now began between the Fadriques, who claimed the full inheritance of Boniface, particularly the castles of Karystos and Larmena on Euboea, and Venice, which reluctantly supported the claims of Boniface's son Thomas, who was a Venetian citizen. In the end, Venice managed to secure control of Larmena. Over the following decades, the Republic gradually extended its power over the island, until finally it acquired Karystos from Alfonso Fadrique's heir, Boniface Fadrique, in 1365.

== Sources ==
- Fine, John V. A. (1994) [1987]. The Late Medieval Balkans: A Critical Survey from the Late Twelfth Century to the Ottoman Conquest. Ann Arbor, Michigan: University of Michigan Press. ISBN 978-0-472-10079-8.
- Luttrell, Anthony (1987). "da Verona, Bonifacio". Dizionario Biografico degli Italiani (in Italian). Vol. 33: D'Asaro–De Foresta. Rome: Istituto dell'Enciclopedia Italiana. ISBN 978-88-12-00032-6.
- Miller, William (1908). The Latins in the Levant: A History of Frankish Greece (1204–1566). London: John Murray.
- Miller, William (1921). Essays on the Latin Orient. Cambridge: Cambridge University Press.
- Setton, Kenneth M. (1976). The Papacy and the Levant (1204–1571), Volume I: The Thirteenth and Fourteenth Centuries. Vol. 1. Philadelphia: The American Philosophical Society. ISBN 0-87169-114-0.

Vacant Byzantine occupation Title last held by Agnese Ghisi	Lord of Karystos; 1296–1317	Succeeded by Marulla of Verona with Alfonso Fadrique
