= John Fadrique =

- lord of Aerina & Salamis
- Reign: c. 1350
- Predecessor: Peter Fadrique
- Died: 1366
- Noble family: of Barcelona
- Father: Alfonso Fadrique
- Mother: Marulla of Verona

John Fadrique (died 1366) was a son of Alfonso Fadrique, vicar general of Athens and Neopatras, and Marulla of Verona. He is attested as lord of Aegina and Salamis in 1350.

== Sources ==
- Setton, Kenneth M. (1975). "The Catalans in Greece, 1311–1388". In Setton, Kenneth M.; Hazard, Harry W. (eds.). A History of the Crusades, Volume III: The Fourteenth and Fifteenth Centuries. Vol. 3. Madison and London: University of Wisconsin Press. pp. 167–224. ISBN 0-299-06670-3.

Preceded by Peter Fadrique	Lord of Aegina ca. 1350	Unknown
