= Eleanor of Anjou =

Queen consort of Sicily (1289–1341)

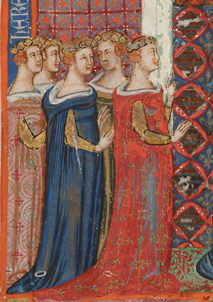
- Eleanor with her sisters in the Bible of Naples

Queen consort of Sicily
- Tenure: 17 May 1302 – 25 June 1337
- Born: August 1289
- Died: 9 August 1341 (aged 51–52)
- Spouse: Philippe II de Toucy; Frederick III of Sicily
- Issue among others...: Peter II of Sicily; Manfred, Duke of Athens; Constance, Queen of Cyprus; Elisabeth, Duchess of Bavaria; William II, Duke of Athens; John, Duke of Randazzo; Margaret, Countess Palatine of the Rhine
- House: Anjou-Sicily
- Father: Charles II of Naples
- Mother: Mary of Hungary

Eleanor of Anjou (August 1289 – 9 August 1341) was Queen of Sicily as the wife of King Frederick III of Sicily. She was a member of the Capetian House of Anjou by birth.

== Life ==
She was the third daughter of King Charles II of Naples and Mary of Hungary.

Eleanor was firstly married in 1299 to Philippe II de Toucy, son of Narjot de Toucy, Lord of Laterza, and Lucia of Tripoli. Their marriage was dissolved on 17 January 1300 by Pope Boniface VIII because they were related and had not sought permission from the pope to marry.

On 17 May 1302, Eleanor married secondly to the King of Sicily, Frederick III. Her father and her new husband had been engaged in a war for ascendancy in the Mediterranean Sea and especially Sicily and the Mezzogiorno. The marriage was part of a diplomatic effort to establish peaceful relations which would lead to the Peace of Caltabellotta (19 August 1302).

The peace divided the old Kingdom of Sicily into an island portion and a peninsular portion. The island, called the Kingdom of Trinacria, went to Frederick, who had been ruling it, and the Mezzogiorno, called the Kingdom of Sicily contemporaneously, but called the Kingdom of Naples by modern scholarship, went to Charles II, who had been ruling it. Thus, the peace was formal recognition of an uneasy status quo.

Eleanor died on the 9 August 1341 at the Monastery of San Nicolo di Arena (Catania), she had been a widow since 1337. She was buried at a Franciscan monastery in Catania.

== Issue ==
Eleanor and Frederick had nine children:

- Peter II of Sicily (1305–1342), successor
- Roger (born 1305), died young
- Manfred, Duke of Athens and Neopatria (1306–1317), Duke of Athens and Neopatria
- Constance, married on December 29, 1331 to Leo IV of Armenia
- Elisabeth (1310–1349),(also known as Isabella), married (1328) Stephen II of Bavaria
- William, Prince of Taranto (1312–1338), Prince of Taranto, Duke of Athens and Neopatria
- Giovanni di Randazzo (1317–1348), Duke of Randazzo, Duke of Athens and Neopatria, Regent of Sicily (from 1338)
- Catherine (1320–1342)
- Margaret (1331–1377), married (1348) Rudolf II of the Palatinate

== Sources ==
- Dunbabin, Jean (2011). The French in the Kingdom of Sicily, 1266–1305. Cambridge University Press.
- Grierson, Philip; Travaini, Lucia (1998). Medieval European Coinage. Vol. 14, South Italy, Sicily, Sardinia. Cambridge University Press.
- Hulme, Edward Maslin (1915). The Renaissance: The Protestant Revolution and the Catholic Reformation in Continental Europe. The Century Co.
- Musto, Ronald G. (2003). Apocalypse in Rome: Cola di Rienzo and the Politics of the New Age. University of California Press.

Eleanor of Anjou Capetian House of Anjou Cadet branch of the House of Capet Born: August 1289 Died: 9 August 1341
Royal titles
Preceded by Blanche of Anjou	Queen consort of Sicily; 17 May 1302 – 25 June 1337	Succeeded by Elisabeth of Carinthia
