= Maria Fadrique =

Lady of the Lordship of Salona from 1382 to 1394

Lady of Salona
- Reign: 1382 - 1394
- Predecessor: Louis Fadrique
- Successor: title abolished
- Regent: Helena Asanina Kantakouzene
- Born: c. 1370; Lordship of Salona, Frankish Greece
- Died: c. 1394 (aged 23–24); Ottoman Sultanate
- Consort of: Bayezid I
- Father: Louis Fadrique
- Mother: Helena Asanina Kantakouzene

Maria Fadrique (1370 - c. 1394) was the Lady regnant of Salona in Frankish Greece from 1382 until its conquest by the Ottoman Empire in 1394 under the regency of her mother, Helena Asanina Kantakouzene.

== Life ==
Maria was the daughter of Louis Fadrique, Count of Salona, lord of Zetouni and lord of Aegina and Helena Asanina Kantakouzene. When her father died in 1382, she became ruling Lady of Salona under the regency of her mother, the Dowager Countess of Salona.

Maria, whom Laonikos Chalkokondyles describes as very beautiful, was much sought after in marriage. Her first betrothal, around 1382, was to Bernaduch, a son of Philip Dalmau, Viscount of Rocaberti. When Helena was threatened by the alliance of her cousin Theodore I Palaiologos, Despot of the Morea, and Nerio I Acciaioli, Duke of Athens, she sought the help of an unidentified son of Simeon Uroš, Despot of Epirus, whom Donald Nicol suggests was Stephen of Pharsalos. This arrangement came close to being consummated with a marriage, for King Peter IV of Aragon wrote to Helena on 17 August 1386 and reproached her for marrying her daughter to a foreigner. In any case, negotiations for her marriage to Bernaduch of Rocaberti resumed in 1387. In April 1388, King John I of Aragon offered her the rights of castellan over Athens on the condition she would defend the city. Nerio Acciaioli is said to have sought her hand for his brother-in-law Pietro Saraceno, but in 1390 arrangements appear to have been made for Maria to marry Matthew of Montcada, son of William Raymond of Montcada, Count of Augusta.

Chalkokondyles tells how Salona was captured by the Ottoman Sultan Bayezid I, and that afterwards both Helena and her daughter Maria entered the Sultan's harem, where she died in 1394, maybe executed. According to a letter from Nerio Acciaioli to his brother Donato dated 20 February 1394, the capture of Salona can be dated either at the end of 1393 or the beginning of 1394.

== Sources ==
- Nicol, Donald M. (1968). The Byzantine Family of Kantakouzenos (Cantacuzenus), ca. 1100–1460: A Genealogical and Prosopographical Study. Dumbarton Oaks studies 11. Washington, DC: Dumbarton Oaks Center for Byzantine Studies.
