= Roger Deslaur =

Roger Deslaur or Desllor, a knight from Roussillon in the service of Walter V of Brienne, Duke of Athens, was one of the few men to survive the bloody Battle of Halmyros on 15 March 1311. Captured by the Catalan Company, he accepted the post of rector and marshal of the company (rector et marescalcus universitatis) after Boniface of Verona declined it.

Deslaur was the agent through which Walter had first hired the Catalan Company for six months in 1310. Deslaur remained with Walter even after he tried to expel the Catalans. Following Halmyros, the Catalans granted Deslaur the fief of Salona (called "La Sola" by Ramon Muntaner) and the hand in marriage of the widow of the lord of Salona, Thomas III of Autremencourt. Deslaur, however, proved ineffective as a defender of the Catalan conquests. Menaced by the Venetian colony of Negroponte and the Frankish Morea, he negotiated the handover of suzerainty to Frederick II of Sicily, who appointed his young son Manfred duke (1312). Frederick sent Berenguer Estañol to act as Manfred's vicar general and Deslaur stepped down from his post as leader of the company and duke of Athens, retiring to his castle at Salona, which he either escheated, or he was forced to relinquish, to Alfonso Fadrique around 1318.

Preceded by Walter V of Brienne	Duke of Athens; 1311–1312	Succeeded by Manfred
Preceded by Thomas III d'Autremencourt	Lord of Salona; 1311–1318	Succeeded by Alfonso Fadrique as Count of Salona
