= Marulla of Verona =

Marulla of Verona or Maria of Verona (Italian: Marulla da Verona; died 1326), was Lady of Karystos in Frankish Greece in 1318–1326.

She was the daughter of Boniface of Verona, Lord of Karystos, and one of the major barons of the Duchy of Athens.

She married Alfonso Fadrique, the illegitimate son of Frederick II of Sicily. She left five sons and two daughters:

- Simona, who wed George II Ghisi
- Pedro, Count of Salona from 1338 to 1355
- James, Count of Salona from 1355 to 1365
- William Fadrique, lord of Livadeia
- Boniface, lord of Aigina, Piada and Karystos
- John, lord of Salamina, married Marulla Zaccaria

== Sources ==
- Setton, Kenneth M. (1976). The Papacy and the Levant (1204–1571), Volume I: The Thirteenth and Fourteenth Centuries. Philadelphia: The American Philosophical Society. ISBN 0-87169-114-0.
- Setton, Kenneth M.; Hazard, Harry W., eds. (1975). A History of the Crusades, Volume III: The Fourteenth and Fifteenth Centuries. Madison and London: University of Wisconsin Press. ISBN 0-299-06670-3.
- Setton, Kenneth M. Catalan Domination of Athens 1311–1380. Revised edition. Variorum: London, 1975.
