= Hubert Netzer =

German sculptor

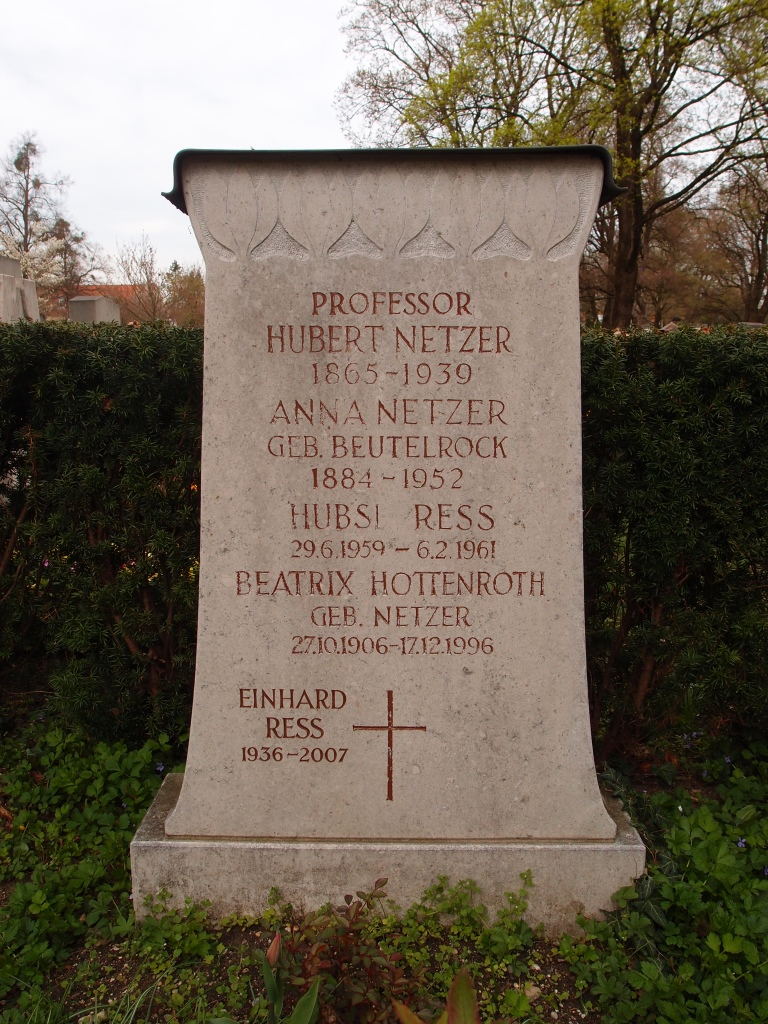
Grave of Hubert Netzer in the Pasing cemetery in Munich

Hubert Netzer (5 October 1865 in Isny im Allgäu – 15 October 1939 in Munich) was a German sculptor, medalist, and university professor.

== Life and work ==
Netzer was born in 1865 in Isny im Allgäu, Kingdom of Württemberg, Germany, the son of an Allgäu gilder. In 1890 he attended the Academy of Fine Arts in Munich. At the Academy he was a student of Adolf von Hildebrand, de:Johannes Hoffart, and Wilhelm von Rümann.

Netzer taught at the Dusseldorf School of Arts and Crafts (from 1919 the Kunstakademie Dusseldorf) beginning in 1911, Netzer had made a name for himself by designing a series of fountains in Munich, among others the Tritonbrunnen in 1893, Nornenbrunnen in 1907 and the Jonasbrunnen in 1910. In the sculpture class at the School of Arts and Crafts Kunstgewerbeschule under the direction of Wilhelm Kreis, Netzer taught the use of sculpture and painting in architecture.

Hubert Netzer was a member of the Deutscher Künstlerbund (Association of German Artists). Among his students were Arno Breker, de:Hans Meyers, de:Ernst Gottschalk, de:Curt Beckmann, de:Ferdinand Heseding, and de:Willi Hoselmann.

Netzer is the father of the painter, graphic artist and art writer de:Remigius Netzer (1916–1985).

== Works ==
- 1893: Triton Fountain at the Herzog Wilhelm Street, Munich
- 1896: Prometheus-figure group on the gable of the central structure of the University of Würzburg
- 1896: Narcissus fountain in the southwestern garden part of the Bavarian National Museum in Munich
- 1907: Nornenbrunnen in Munich
- 1910: Margaret of Sicily-Aragon and 3 other rulers in the collegiate church in Neustadt an der Weinstraße
- 1911: Jonasbrunnen on the Josephsplatz in Munich (Sculpture destroyed by war and replaced by the Franziskusbrunnen in 1961)
- 1913: First version of the Blitzeschleuderer (Lightning Hurler) as a competition draft for a world telegraphy monument in Bern (awarded the 2nd prize)
- 1915/1921: Siegfried Memorial on the Cemetery of Honor in Duisburg-Kaiserberg (designed in 1915, cast in 1919, erected in 1921)
- 1918/1925: Revision of the Blitzeschleuderer (Draft 1918 issued in Berlin, 1924/1925 by the foundry Gustav Schmäke (Dusseldorf) cast in bronze, 1926–1974 in the south curve of the Düsseldorf Rheinstadion, since 2004 in the roundabout on the Heinz-Ingenstau-Straße in Dusseldorf)
- 1921: Sinnende Klio (also trauernde Muse – sorrowing Muse) with medallion (bust relief) of the mine director Hermann Brassert in Bonn at the Alten Zoll
- c.1923: Six seated images of the virtues on the portico of the former country and district court building in Mühlenstraße in Düsseldorf-Altstadt
- 1928: War memorial in the memorial hall of the Ehrenfriedhof on the Schillerstraße in Duisburg-Homberg

== Honors ==
There is a Hubert Netzer Way in his birthplace, Isny.

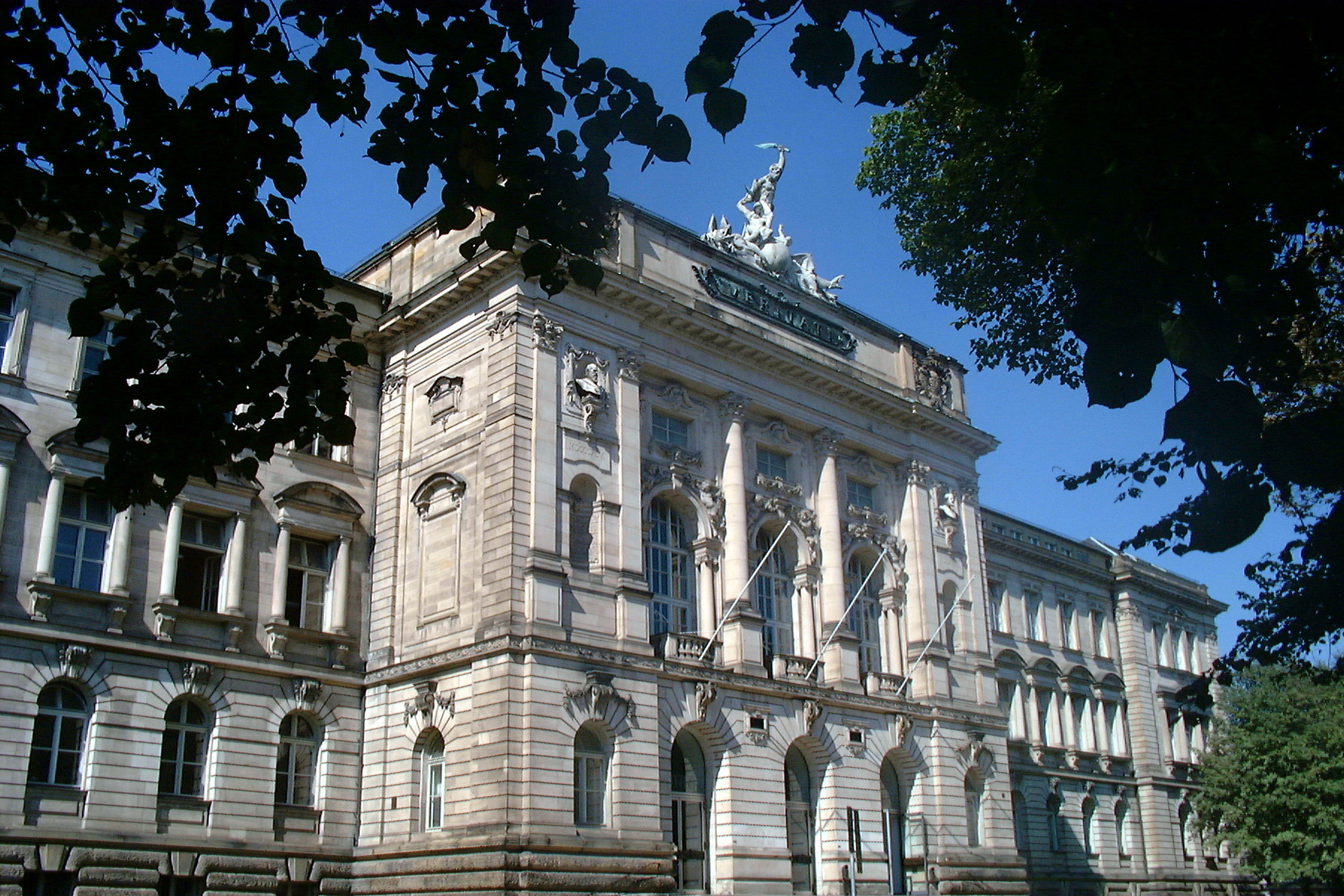
Central building of the University of Würzburg with the Prometheus group

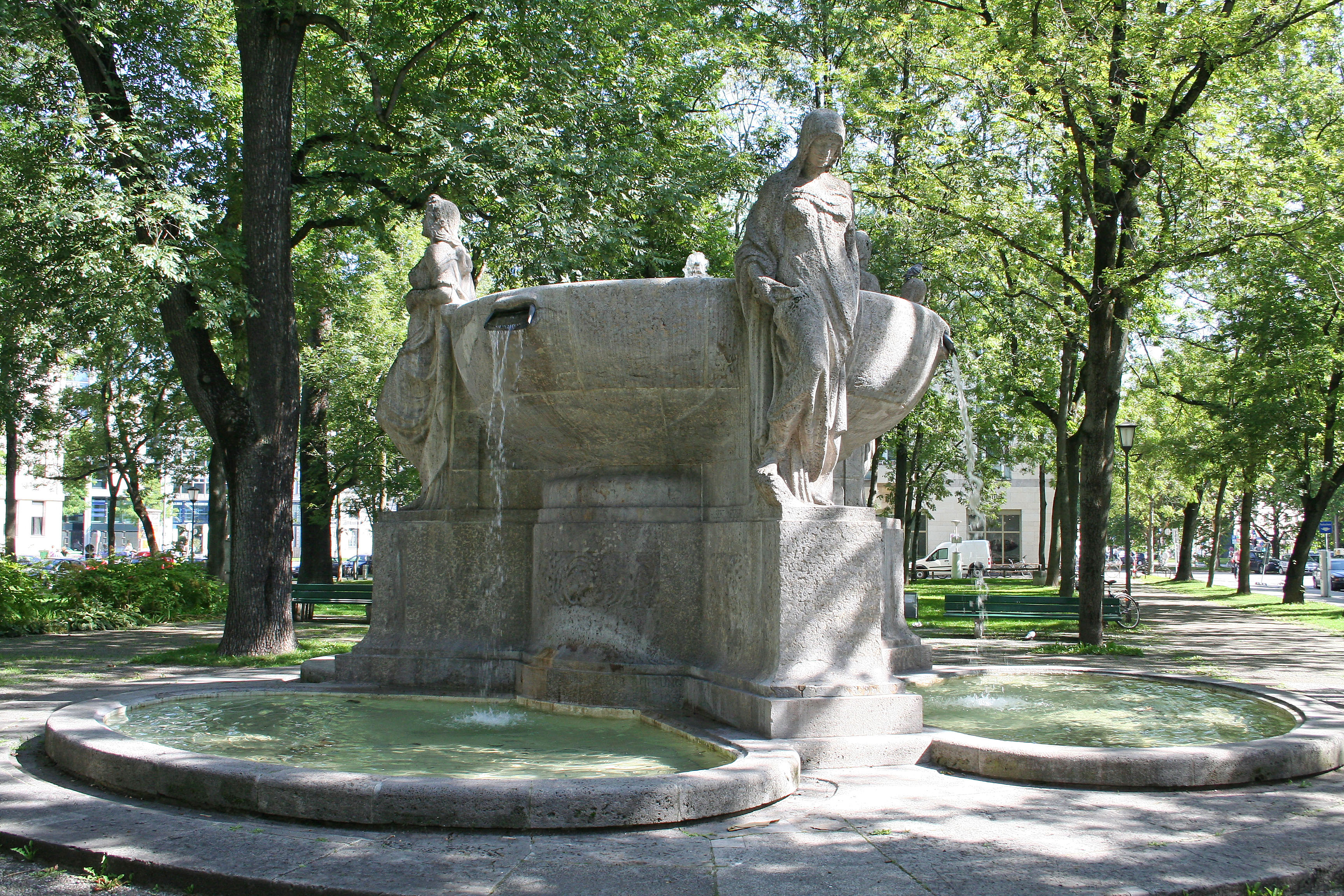
Nornenbrunnen in Munich

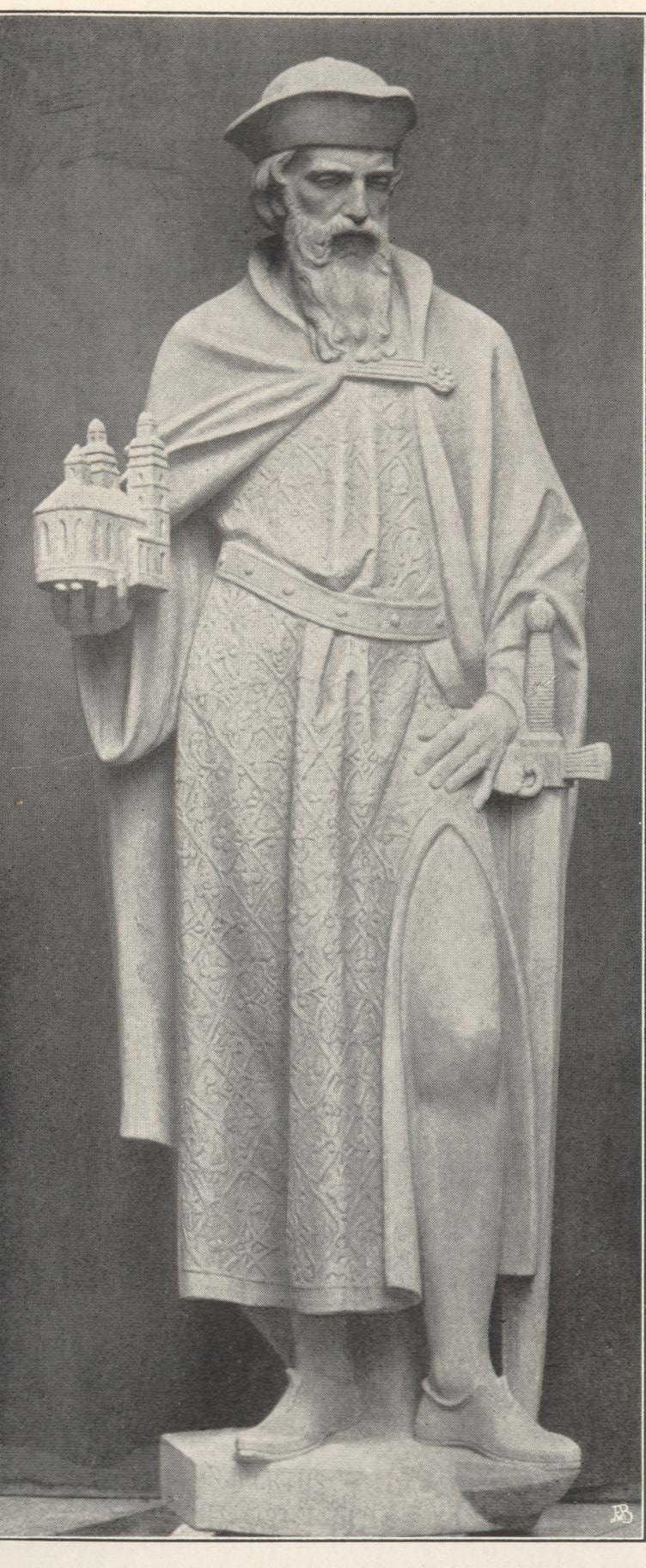
Rupert I, Elector Palatine (1910) in the collegiate church in Neustadt an der Weinstraße

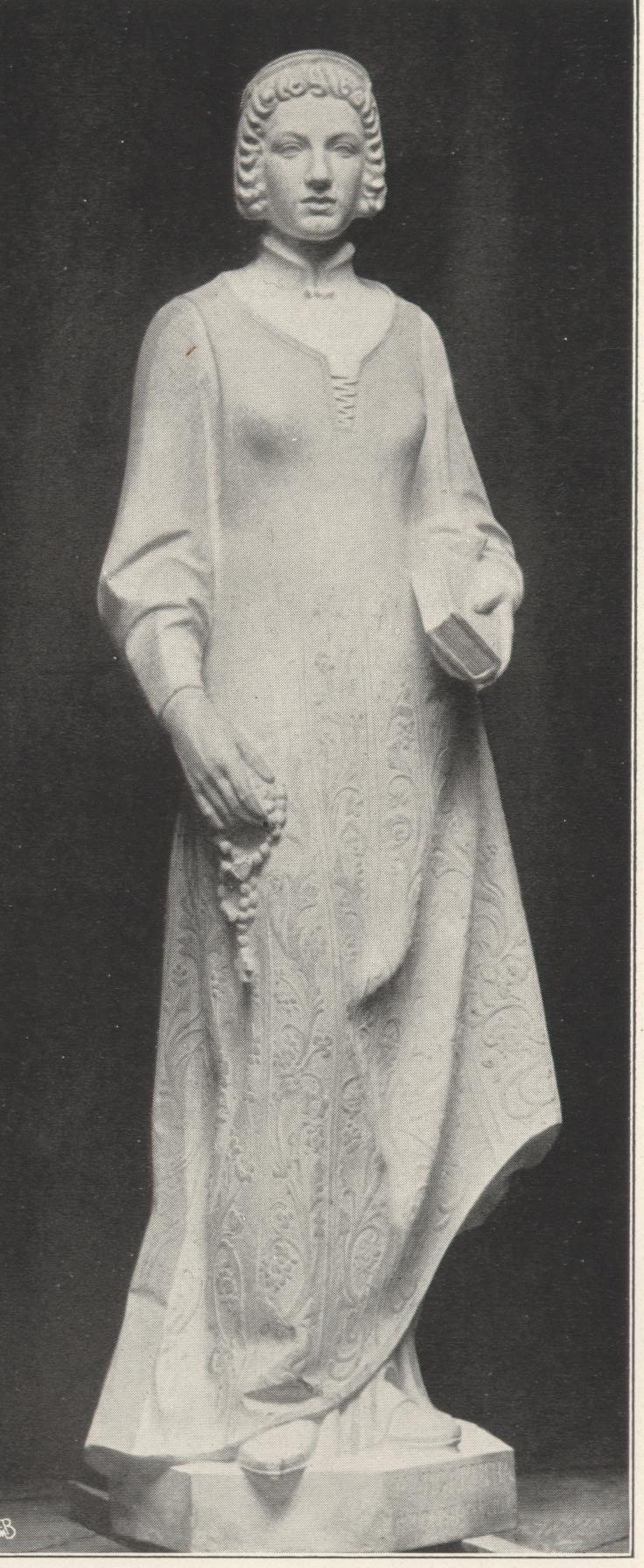
Margarete of Sicily-Aragon (1910) in the Neustadt collegiate church

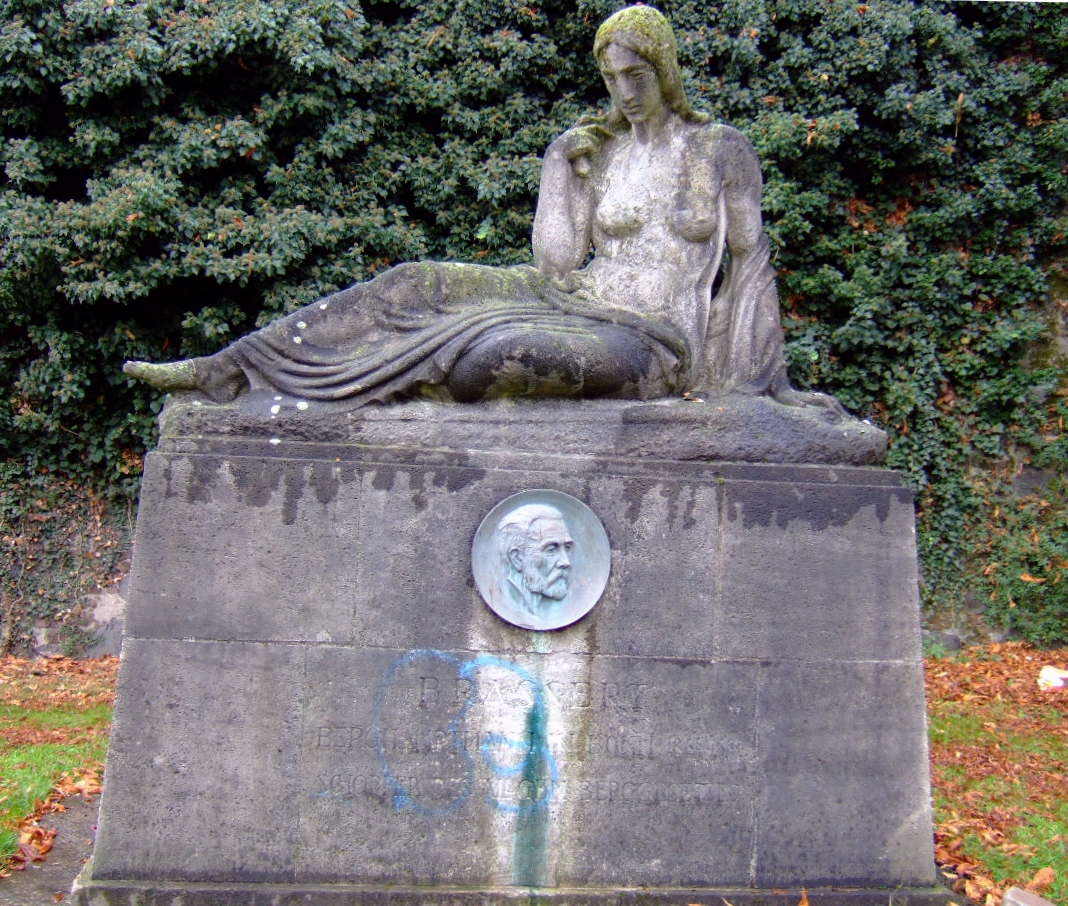
Trauernde Muse (sinnende Klio) and portrait medallion in Bonn

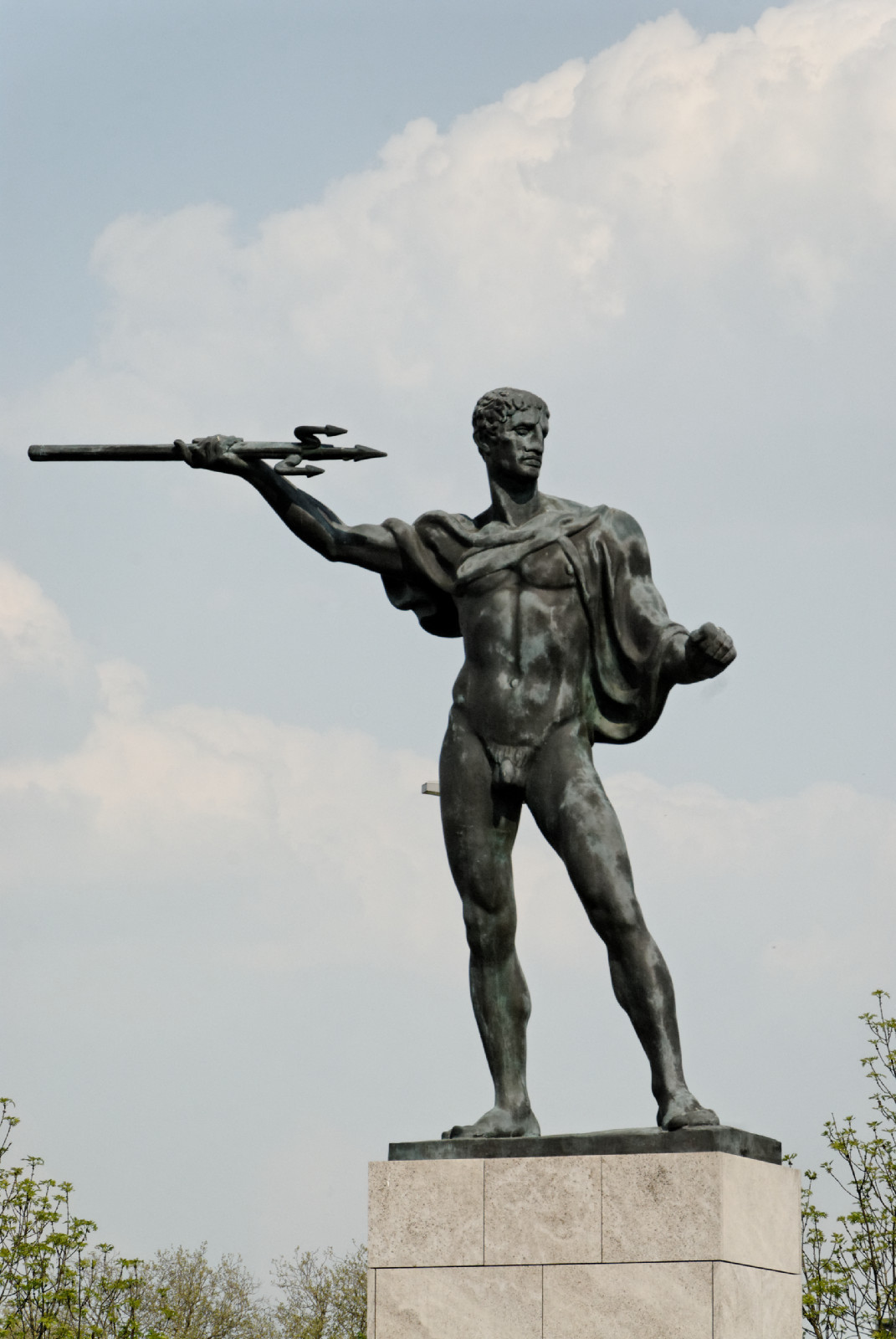
Blitzeschleuderer in Düsseldorf

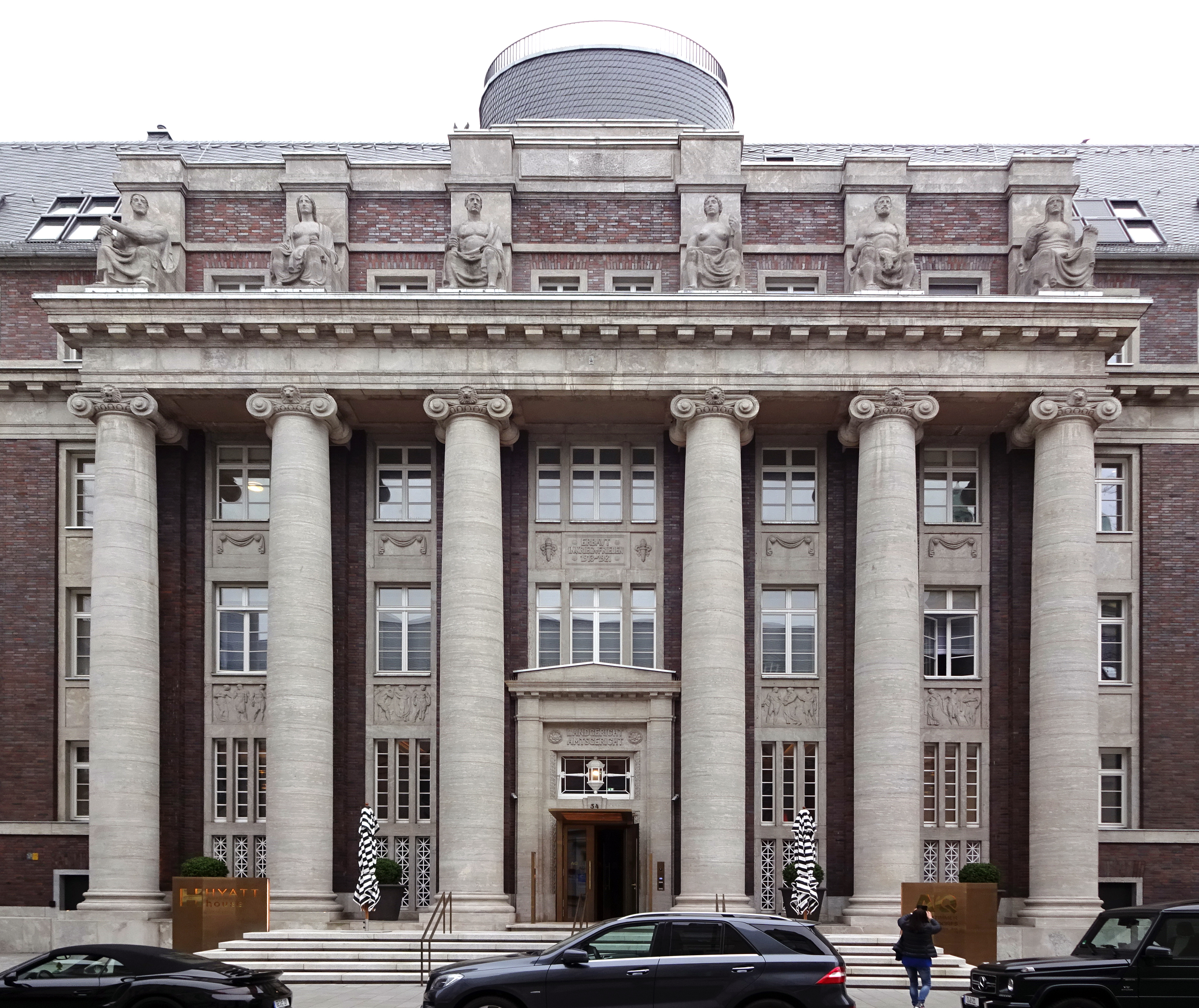
Portico of the Ehemaligen Amtsgerichts, Düsseldorf

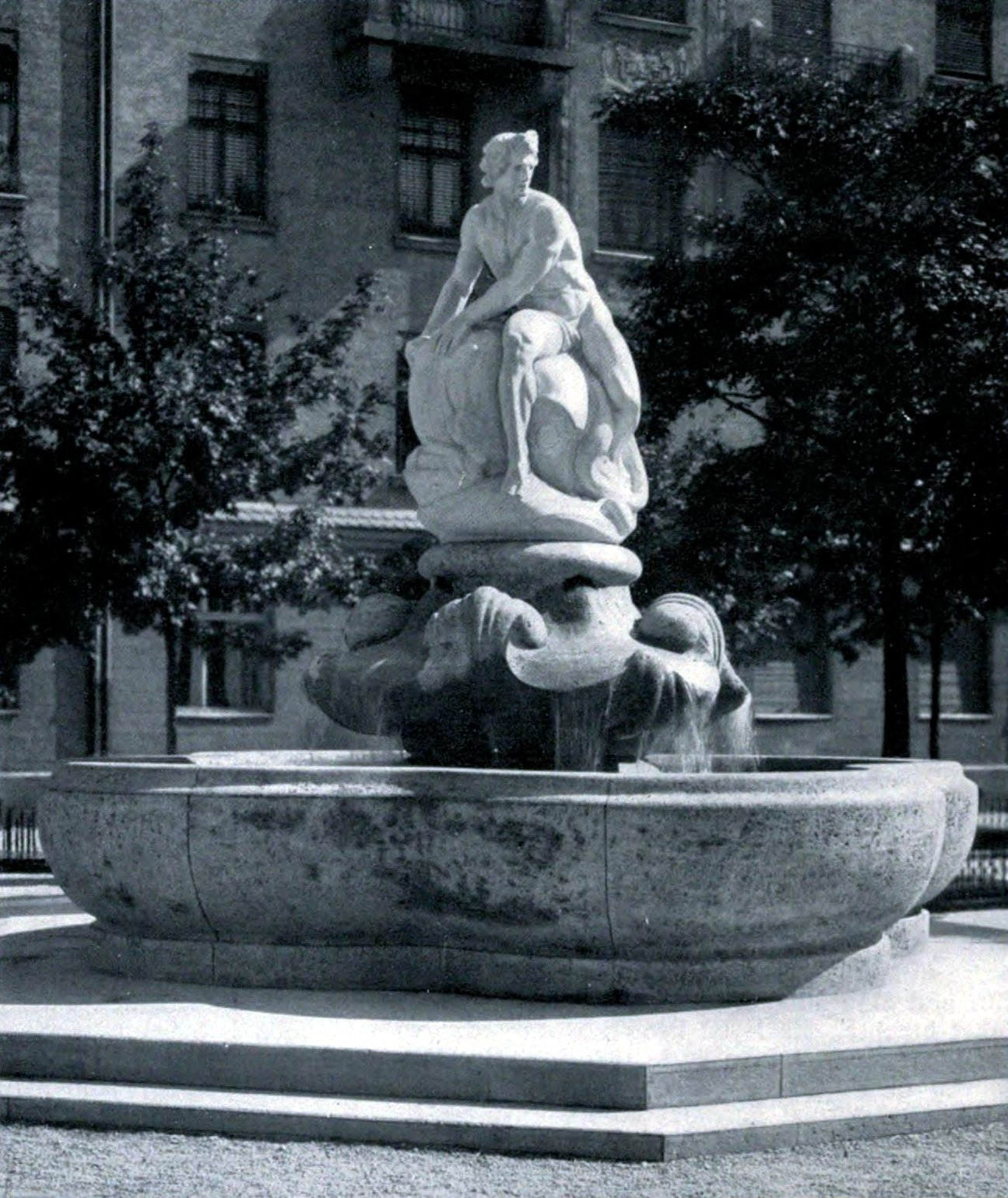
Former Jonasbrunnen in Munich
