= Margaret of Sicily (disambiguation) =

People known as Margaret of Sicily:

- Margaret of Navarre (1135–1183), wife of William I of Sicily
- Margaret of Sicily (1241–1270), daughter of Frederick II, King of Sicily
- Margaret of Burgundy, Queen of Sicily, (1250–1308), wife of Charles of Anjou, King of Sicily
- Margaret of Sicily, Countess Palatine of the Rhine (1331–1377), daughter of the King Frederick III of Sicily
