= Family of Verona =

The Family of Verona (Italian: da Verona) was a noble Italian family originally from Verona. The family descended from the Lombards, and are most notable as the ruling house of the Triarchy of Negroponte, established on the island of Euboea in Greece, between 1205 and 1470.

== Members ==
- Giberto I da Verona
  - Alberto da Verona
  - Guglielmo da Verona
    - Giberto II da Verona
      - Guglielmo da Verona
      - Francesco da Verona
      - Beatrice da Verona
    - Guglielmo II da Verona
    - Margherita da Verona
    - Felisa da Verona
    - Porzia da Verona
    - Francesco I da Verona
    - Corrado Lorea
    - Agnese da Verona
  - Francesco da Verona
    - Boniface da Verona
      - Marulla da Verona
      - Helena da Verona
      - Tommaso da Verona
      - Paul da Verona
      - Joseph of Verona
      - Edward of Verona

== Sources ==
- Bury, John Bagnell (1886). "The Lombards and Venetians in Euboia (1205–1303)" (PDF). The Journal of Hellenic Studies. 7: 309–352. doi:10.2307/623649. JSTOR 623649.
- Bury, John Bagnell (1887). "The Lombards and Venetians in Euboia (1303–1340)". The Journal of Hellenic Studies. 8: 194–213.
- Bury, John Bagnell (1888). "The Lombards and Venetians in Euboia (1430–1470)". The Journal of Hellenic Studies. 9: 91–117. doi:10.2307/623661. JSTOR 623661.
