= Louis Fadrique =

Count of Salona

- Vicar-General of the Duchy of Athens and Neopatras

Count of Salona
- Reign: c. 1375 - 1382
- Predecessor: Boniface Fadrique
- Successor: Helena Asanina Kantakouzene
- Died: 1382
- Noble family: Barcelona
- Spouse: Helena Asanina Kantakouzene
- Issue: Maria Fadrique
- Father: James Fadrique

Louis Fadrique (also Luis or Lluís Frederic d'Aragó; died 1382) a Catalan nobleman who was Count of Salona, as well as lord of various other towns in Central Greece from c.1365 until his death in 1382. In 1375–1381 he also served as the vicar-general of the twin duchy of Athens and Neopatras.

== Biography ==
Louis was the son of James Fadrique and a grandson of Alfonso Fadrique. When his father seized the fortress of Siderokastron in 1365, Louis became its castellan, although he was underage. When James died in 1366, Louis in addition received possession of the nearby town of Zetouni. Following the machinations of the agents of the then vicar-general, Roger de Llúria, in June 1367 King Frederick III of Sicily ordered Louis to surrender Siderokastron to Nicholas de Sosa, but Louis seems to have disregarded this and maintained control of the fortress throughout his life. In ca. 1368 he married Helena Asanina Kantakouzene, daughter of Matthew Kantakouzenos, the former Byzantine co-emperor (1353–1357). The couple had one daughter, Maria.

Louis also came into conflict with his uncle, Boniface Fadrique, to whom James had willed "all his rights and properties" in the Duchy of Athens, including the County of Salona with Loidoriki and Veteranitsa, and the island of Aegina, which Boniface gave his son Peter. With the support of most of the Catalan feudatories, rattled following the capture of Megara by the Florentine adventurer Nerio I Acciaioli, in April 1375, Louis obtained from Frederick III his appointment as vicar-general of the twin duchy of Athens and Neopatras. He had apparently exercised the duties of the office since the death or incapacitation of his rather incompetent predecessor, Matthew of Peralta, in the previous year; and would remain in office until the autumn of 1381. From this position, Louis was able to defeat his uncle and cousin when they took up arms against him. Louis took over their properties, and sent Peter to exile and prison in Aragon. His uncle Boniface died soon after sometime before September 1380.

After the death of Frederick III, Louis supported the assumption of the ducal crown by King Peter IV of Aragon in opposition to Frederick's daughter, Maria. Peter finally succeeded in 1379, and the two duchies of Athens and Neopatras were annexed directly into the Crown of Aragon. Although Boniface's widow and his other son, John, obtained a pardon from the new Duke in May 1381 and a promise for the restitution of Boniface's possessions, it is unclear whether this was ever done; at any rate Louis appears as the "Count of Salona" in a list dated to 1380/31. Louis was less successful against another powerful feudatory, the castellan of Athens, Galcerán of Peralta. Apparently enjoying the support of the Catalans of the city, Peralta was able to withstand Louis from the Acropolis of Athens. Having himself firmly supported Peter IV in the dispute over control of the duchies, he was able to secure recognition of his position, possessions and privileges in an agreement with Louis, ratified by Peter IV in September 1380.

At the same time, the Catalan duchies faced a new and dangerous opponent: the mercenary Navarrese Company, which in spring 1379 invaded Boeotia from the Morea—with the permission, if not connivance, of their ally Nerio Acciaioli, who controlled the region linking the Morea with Central Greece. The Navarrese quickly conquered Thebes, the capital of the Duchy of Athens, which had been left unfortified, in May or June 1379. Despite the fall of Thebes, Louis persistently remained opposed to dealing with the Navarrese. Aside from Acciaioli, the latter also enjoyed the support of the Knights Hospitaller, and the soon allied themselves with two of the Catalans' neighbours, the Duke of the Archipelago Nicholas III dalle Carceri, and the Marquis of Bodonitsa, Francis Zorzi. In late 1380 or early 1381, the Navarrese took the town of Livadeia as well. Louis took up some of the refugees from the city in his fief of Salona, while others fled to Euboea.

In early autumn 1381, Louis was replaced as vicar-general by Philip Dalmau, Viscount of Rocaberti, who had already been appointed in 1379 but had not yet arrived in Greece to take up his position. During Dalmau's residence in Greece, Louis discussed with him the possibility of a marriage between his daughter and Dalmau's son Bernaduch, but he died in mid-autumn 1382. He was succeeded in Salona by his widow, while King Peter IV gave his daughter Maria possession of Siderokastron for life, on the condition that she married Bernaduch. This marriage never materialized, however, and the Catalan sources make no further reference to Siderokastron after that.

== Sources ==
- Miller, William (1908). The Latins in the Levant: A History of Frankish Greece (1204–1566). London: John Murray.
- Setton, Kenneth M. (1975). "The Catalans in Greece, 1311–1388". In Setton, Kenneth M.; Hazard, Harry W. (eds.). A History of the Crusades, Volume III: The Fourteenth and Fifteenth Centuries. Vol. 3. Madison and London: University of Wisconsin Press. pp. 167–224. ISBN 0-299-06670-3.
- Setton, Kenneth M. (1975). "The Catalans and Florentines in Greece, 1311–1462". In Setton, Kenneth M.; Hazard, Harry W. (eds.). A History of the Crusades, Volume III: The Fourteenth and Fifteenth Centuries. Vol. 3. Madison and London: University of Wisconsin Press. pp. 225–277. ISBN 0-299-06670-3.

Preceded by Matthew of Peralta	Vicar-general of the Duchies of Athens and Neopatras; 1375–1381	Succeeded by Philip Dalmau, Viscount of Rocaberti
Preceded by Boniface Fadrique	Count of Salona ca. 1375 – 1382	Succeeded by Helena Asanina Kantakouzene
