= Nornenbrunnen (Munich) =

Coordinates: 48°08′34″N 11°34′18″E

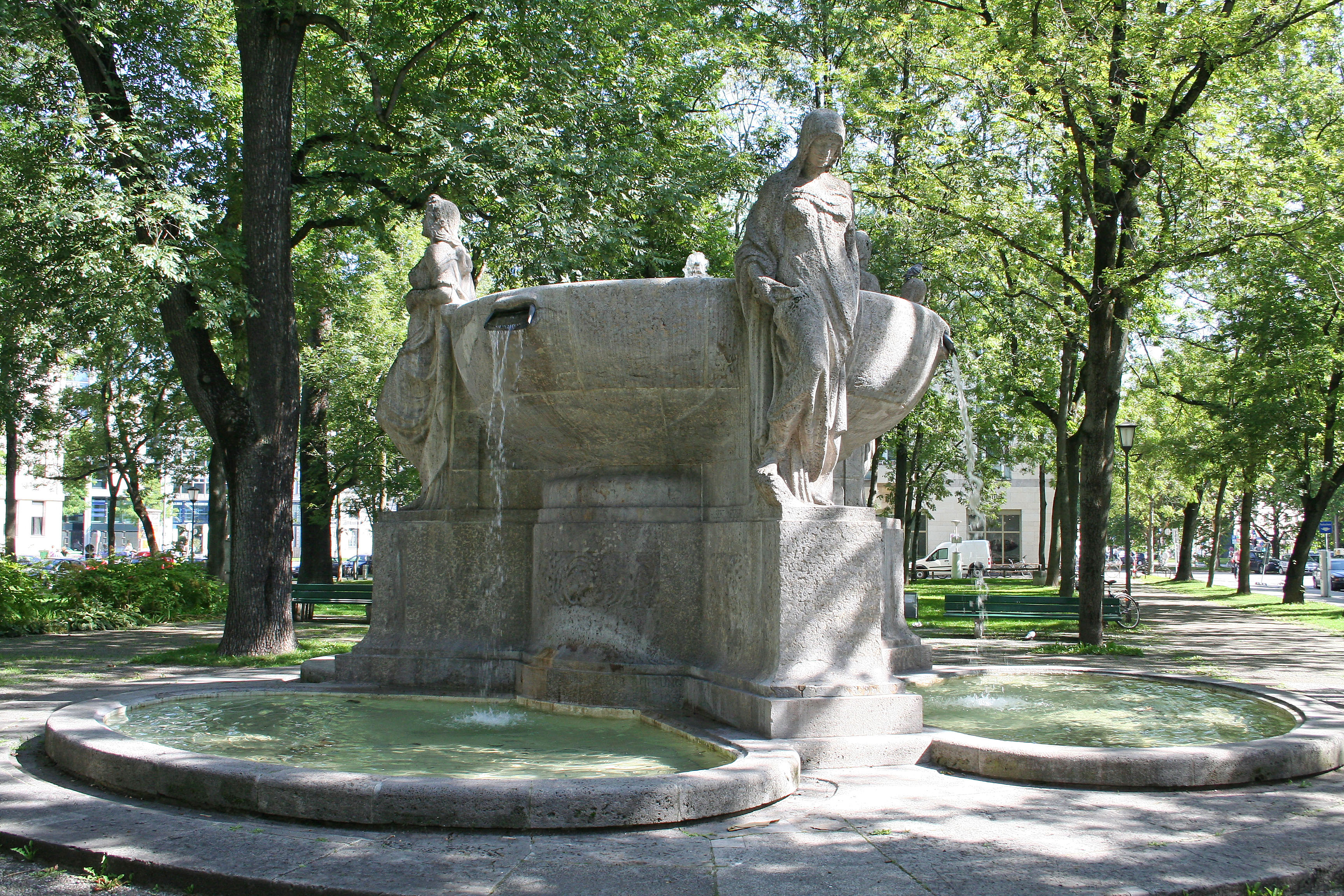
The Norenbrunnen

The Nornenbrunnen (Norn fountain) is a fountain in the center of Munich, Germany. It was built in 1907 based on a design by Hubert Netzer in Art Nouveau style. The fountain is constructed of Kirchheim limestone and depicts the Norns, the three Germanic goddesses of destiny: Urd, Verdandi, and Skuld, who lean against a large water bowl. Between the figures are three mouths from which the water pours into three shallow basins on the ground.

The fountain was originally erected at the Stachus, a large square in central Munich. As part of the reconstruction of the square in 1970 the fountain was disassembled and rebuilt in 1965 at its present location in the Eschenanlage on Maximiliansplatz.
