= Ferrer d'Abella =

Ferrer d'Abella (Latin Ferrarius de Apilia) was a Catalan Dominican friar, diplomat, and scholar of the fourteenth century. He was the Latin Archbishop of Neopatras from some time before June 1323 until September 1330, when he was made Bishop of Mazzara, in Sicily. He had tried to become Archbishop of Torres in Sardinia in 1325, but was met with opposition and animosity of Pope John XXII.

His influence with the House of Barcelona which ruled in Neopatras, Sicily, and Sardinia was great. He was succeeded in Neopatras by one John Mascó.

== Sources ==
- Giunta, Francesco (1960). "Abella, Ferrer". Dizionario Biografico degli Italiani, Volume 1: Aaron–Albertucci (in Italian). Rome: Istituto dell'Enciclopedia Italiana. ISBN 978-8-81200032-6.
- Setton, Kenneth M. Catalan Domination of Athens 1311–1380. Revised edition. London: Variorum, 1975.
