= Latin Archbishopric of Neopatras =

Titular see of the Catholic Church

The Latin or Roman Catholic Archbishopric of Neopatras is a titular see of the Catholic Church. It was established briefly as a residential episcopal see at Neopatras ("New Patras", modern Ypati) in Central Greece, after the Fourth Crusade, in place of the Greek Orthodox Metropolis of Neopatras. The area was recovered by the Epirote Greeks in c. 1218, but came again under Latin rule in 1319 as the Duchy of Neopatras, leading to the restoration of the see until the Ottoman conquest. The archbishopric was restored as a titular see in 1933. Its last incumbent died in 1967.

== Residential archbishops ==
Name	Tenure	Notes
Anonymous	1208	
John, OSB	13 February 1218 – ?	
Ferrer d'Abella, OP	27 June 1323 – 28 September 1330	Subsequently Bishop of Mazara del Vallo
Jacob		
Pietro Fabbri de Armoniaco, OFM	9 August 1361 – ?	
Francis, OFM		
Matthew, OFM	6 February 1376 – ?	

== Titular holders ==
The Latin archdiocese was nominally restored in 1933 as Catholic Metropolitan titular archbishopric (Latin: Novæ Patræ, adj. Neopatrensis; Curiate Italian: Neopatrasso).

Name	Tenure	Notes
Angel María Pérez y Cecilia, OCD	1934.11.12 – death 1945.06.14	
Leonida Medina	1947.07.19 – death 1953.12.25	
Domenico Menna	1954.09.08 – death 1957.10.08	
Angelo Innocent Fernandes	1959.06.04 – 1967.09.16	As Coadjutor Archbishop of Delhi

== See also ==
- List of Catholic titular sees

== Sources ==
- Novae Patrae at www.catholic-hierarchy.org
- Titular Metropolitan See of Novæ Patræ at www.gcatholic.org
- Pius Bonifacius Gams, Series episcoporum Ecclesiae Catholicae, Leipzig 1931, p. 429
- Le Quien, Michel (1740). Oriens Christianus, in quatuor Patriarchatus digestus: quo exhibentur ecclesiæ, patriarchæ, cæterique præsules totius Orientis. Tomus secundus, in quo Illyricum Orientale ad Patriarchatum Constantinopolitanum pertinens, Patriarchatus Alexandrinus & Antiochenus, magnæque Chaldæorum & Jacobitarum Diœceses exponuntur (in Latin). Paris: Ex Typographia Regia. coll. 123-126. OCLC 955922747.
- Gaetano Moroni, Patrasso o Neopatra o Nova Patrasso, in Dizionario di erudizione storico-ecclesiastica, Vol. LI, Venice 1851, p. 291
- Konrad Eubel, Hierarchia Catholica Medii Aevi, Vol. 1, p. 362; Vol. 2, p. XXXII
