= William II of Athens =

Duke of Athens

William II
- prince of Sicily
- Coat of arms of Aragonese Sicily

Duke of Athens & Neopatria
- Reign: 1317–1338
- Predecessor: Manfred, Duke of Athens
- Successor: John, Duke of Randazzo
- Born: 1312; Catania
- Died: 22 August 1338 (aged 25–26); Trapani
- Buried: Dominican church of Trapani
- Noble family: of Barcelona
- Spouse: María Álvarez de Jérica
- Father: Frederick II of Sicily
- Mother: Eleanor of Anjou

William II (1312 – 22 August 1338) was the third son of Frederick III of Sicily and Eleanor of Anjou. He inherited the Duchy of Athens after the death of his elder brother Manfred on 9 November 1317.

During his minority, his Greek possessions were governed by his illegitimate elder brother Alfonso Frederick, who in 1319 added the Duchy of Neopatria to the Catalan domains. In 1330, Alfonso returned from Greece and William ceded the counties of Malta and Gozo to him. Nicola Lanza replaced him in Greece.

In 1335, William married María Álvarez de Jérica, a descendant of Roger of Lauria, without papal dispensation, as both John XXII and Benedict XII wanted to check the power of Frederick his father. Two years later, his father willed him the Principality of Taranto, the county of Calatafimi, the honour of Monte Sant'Angelo, and various castles and lands in Noto, Spaccaforno, Capo Passero, and Avola when his mother, Eleanor, daughter of Charles II of Naples, died. She died in 1341, but William died first on 22 August 1338. He left his library to the Dominicans of Palermo and was buried in the cathedral there.

== Sources ==
- Fiske, H. Acta Aragonensia. Berlin-Leipzig, 1908.
- Ghisalberti, Alberto M. Dizionario Biografico degli Italiani: III Ammirato – Arcoleo. Rome, 1961.

Preceded by Manfred	Duke of Athens; 1317–1338	Succeeded by John of Randazzo
New title	Duke of Neopatria; 1319–1338	Succeeded by John of Randazzo
