= Pelasgia, Phthiotis =

Town in Central Greece

Pelasgia Πελασγία
- Municipal unit
- Location within the regional unit

- Location within Greece
- Coordinates: 38°57′N 22°50′E
- Country: Greece
- Administrative region: Central Greece
- Regional unit: Phthiotis
- Municipality: Stylida

Area
  - Municipal unit: 128.33 km^{2} (49.55 sq mi)
  - Community: 52.09 km^{2} (20.11 sq mi)

Population (2021)
  - Municipal unit: 2,383
  - Municipal unit density: 18.57/km^{2} (48.09/sq mi)
  - Community: 1,442
  - Community density: 27.68/km^{2} (71.70/sq mi)
- Time zone: UTC+2 (EET)
  - Summer (DST): UTC+3 (EEST)
- Vehicle registration: ΜΙ

Pelasgia (Greek: Πελασγία, formerly Γαρδίκι, Gardiki), is a town and a former municipality in Phthiotis, Greece. Since the 2011 local government reform it is part of the municipality Stylida, of which it is a municipal unit. The municipal unit has an area of 128.334 km^{2}, the community 52.089 km^{2}. In the 2021 census, the municipal unit of Pelasgia numbered 2,383 inhabitants, the town proper 1,442.

== History ==
The village is located at the northern entrance of the Malian Gulf, some 2 km south of the acropolis of the ancient city of Larissa Kremaste.

The ancient city is still mentioned until the early Byzantine period, but was abandoned after the Slavic invasions of the 7th century and reappears only in the 11th century under the new, Slavic, name of Gardiki, which the settlement bore until 1927, when it was renamed to Pelasgia.

In the 11th century, Gardiki—referred to in Byzantine sources also as hetera Gardikia (ἑτέρα Γαρδικία), "the other Gardiki", to distinguish it from the town of the same name near Trikala—was an episcopal see (a suffragan see of the Metropolis of Larissa). The Jewish traveller Benjamin of Tudela, who visited it in 1165, found it almost deserted, with only a few Greek and Jewish families resident. Nevertheless, under Emperor Isaac II Angelos in 1189 it is listed as among the metropolitan sees, albeit without any suffragans. A manuscript list indicates that there was a Greek bishop named John in 1191–92.

In the aftermath of the Fourth Crusade, the town came under Frankish rule, and was known as Gardichy, Cardiche, Lacardica, and Gaudica. The local see accordingly came under the Latin Church. Gams mentions five Latin bishops from 1208 to 1389, the first being Bartholomew, to whom many letters of Pope Innocent III are addressed; Bartholomew was also bishop of Velestino and Demetrias, and seems to have been the only residential Latin bishop.

In 1222 it was recovered by the Epirote Greeks and the see was restored to its Greek Orthodox clergy, becoming an archbishopric and eventually again a metropolis. In 1275 it was ceded by the ruler of Thessaly, John I Doukas, along with Zetounion, Gravia, and Siderokastron, to the Duchy of Athens as part of the dowry of his daughter Helena Angelina Komnene. In ca. 1294 the town was granted by the Duke of Athens Guy II de la Roche to Boniface of Verona, who held its lordship at least until the Battle of Halmyros in 1311.

Along with other towns in southern Thessaly such as Domokos and Pharsalus, in the mid-1320s Gardiki came briefly under the rule of the Catalan Company, which had taken over the Duchy of Athens in the aftermath of Halmyros. Latin bishops of the Dioecesis Cardicensis are still mentioned in 1363 and ca. 1396. The town surrendered to the Ottoman Turks after the fall of Euboea in 1470, and its inhabitants were deported to Constantinople.

The diocese is today listed by the Roman Catholic Church as a titular see.

The substantial boundary walls of the ancient acropolis are still visible, and mosaics from an early Christian basilica have been uncovered a short distance away near the shore.

== Sources ==
- Fine, John V. A. (1994) [1987]. The Late Medieval Balkans: A Critical Survey from the Late Twelfth Century to the Ottoman Conquest. Ann Arbor, Michigan: University of Michigan Press. ISBN 978-0-472-10079-8.
- Koder, Johannes; Hild, Friedrich (1976). Tabula Imperii Byzantini, Band 1: Hellas und Thessalia (in German). Vienna: Verlag der Österreichischen Akademie der Wissenschaften. ISBN 978-3-7001-0182-6.
