= Manfred of Athens =

Prince of Sicily and Duke of Athens (1306–1317)

Manfred
- Prince of Sicily
- Coat of arms of Aragonese Sicily

Duke of Athens & Neopatria
- Reign: 1312–1317
- Predecessor: Roger Deslaur
- Successor: William II, Duke of Athens
- Born: 1306
- Died: 9 November 1317 (aged 10–11); Trapani
- Buried: Dominican church of Trapani
- Noble family: of Barcelona
- Father: Frederick II of Sicily
- Mother: Eleanor of Anjou

Manfred (1306 – 9 November 1317), infante of Sicily, was the second son of Frederick III of Sicily and Eleanor of Anjou.

He was appointed Duke of Athens and Neopatria in 1312 by his father at the request of the knights of the Catalan Company, then in control of Athens. Manfred was only five when he was named duke. His father sent Berenguer Estanyol as his regent.

In 1316, Alfonso Fadrique, Manfred's elder (but illegitimate) brother, was appointed vicar general of Athens. The young Duke never set foot in his realm, however, for he died in a fall from his horse before his twelfth birthday. He died in Trapani and was buried in the Dominican church located there. His younger brother William succeeded him as duke.

Preceded by Roger Deslaur	Duke of Athens and of Neopatria; 1312–1317	Succeeded by William II
