= Matthew of Moncada =

Matthew of Moncada was count of Aderno and Agosta, the grand seneschal of the Kingdom of Sicily under Frederick the Simple.

He was the son of William Raymond II of Moncada and his wife, Margaret Sclafani.

He was twice appointed as vicar-general for the twin duchy of Athens and Neopatras, in 1359–61 and again 1363–66. The latter appointment came after the de facto ruler of the duchies, the marshal Roger de Llúria, had admitted a Turkish garrison into Thebes to strengthen his own position. The inhabitants of the duchy sent a delegation to the King, who in August 1363 appointed Matthew to the post—reportedly for life—with the task of restoring order. He did not himself go to Greece, but the troops he sent were heavily defeated by Roger de Llúria and his men. As Roger de Llúria was also engaged in a conflict with the Venetian colony of Negroponte, and due to the danger posed by his Turkish troops to all Christian states of Greece, a coalition comprising Venice, the Knights Hospitaller, the Principality of Achaea, and the Byzantine province of Mystras had formed, which defeated Roger's Turks in a naval battle off Megara and forced him to come to terms in 1365. Despite the fact that the Catalan lords of Athens were now willing to affirm their submission to the King, Moncada was reluctant to go to Greece, where the situation was unstable and perilous; as a result, King Frederick was forced to legitimize Roger de Llúria's power and acknowledge him as vicar-general in late 1366.

== Sources ==
- Setton, Kenneth M. (1975). "The Catalans and Florentines in Greece, 1311–1462". In Setton, Kenneth M.; Hazard, Harry W. (eds.). A History of the Crusades, Volume III: The Fourteenth and Fifteenth Centuries. Vol. 3. Madison and London: University of Wisconsin Press. pp. 225–277. ISBN 0-299-06670-3.
