= Guglielmo Raimondo II Moncada =

Italian nobleman and soldier

Guglielmo Raimondo Moncada Alagona, conte di Agosta (died 1348) was a 14th-century nobleman and soldier.

== Life ==
He was the son of the Catalan nobleman Guglielmo Raimondo di Moncada, from the family of the barons of Aitona, and his wife Lucchina Alagona, from the family of the counts of Malta and Gozo.

== Marriage and descendants ==
Guglielmo Raimondo Moncada Alagona, first count of Agosta, married Margherita Sclafani d'Incisa, with whom he had issue:

- Matteo, II conte di Agosta (1325 ca.-1378), who married 1) Giovanna Peralta d'Aragona, daughter of Raimondo, conte di Caltabellotta, with whom he had three children; 2) Allegranza Abbate d'Arbes, daughter of Enrico lord of Favignana, with whom he had three children;
- Guglielmo Raimondo, lord of Murgo;
- Costanza, who married Federico Chiaramonte Palizzi, conte di Modica.

== Bibliography (in Italian) ==
- della Lengueglia, G. A. (1657). Ritratti della prosapia et heroi Moncadi nella Sicilia. Vol. 1. Valenza: Sacco.
- Gaetani, marchese di Villabianca, F. M. Emanuele (1754). Della Sicilia nobile. Vol. 1. Palermo: Stamperia de' Santi Apostoli.
- Spreti, V. (1981). Enciclopedia storico-nobiliare italiana. Vol. 5. Bologna: Forni.
