= Margaret of Sicily, Countess Palatine of the Rhine =

Margaret of Sicily
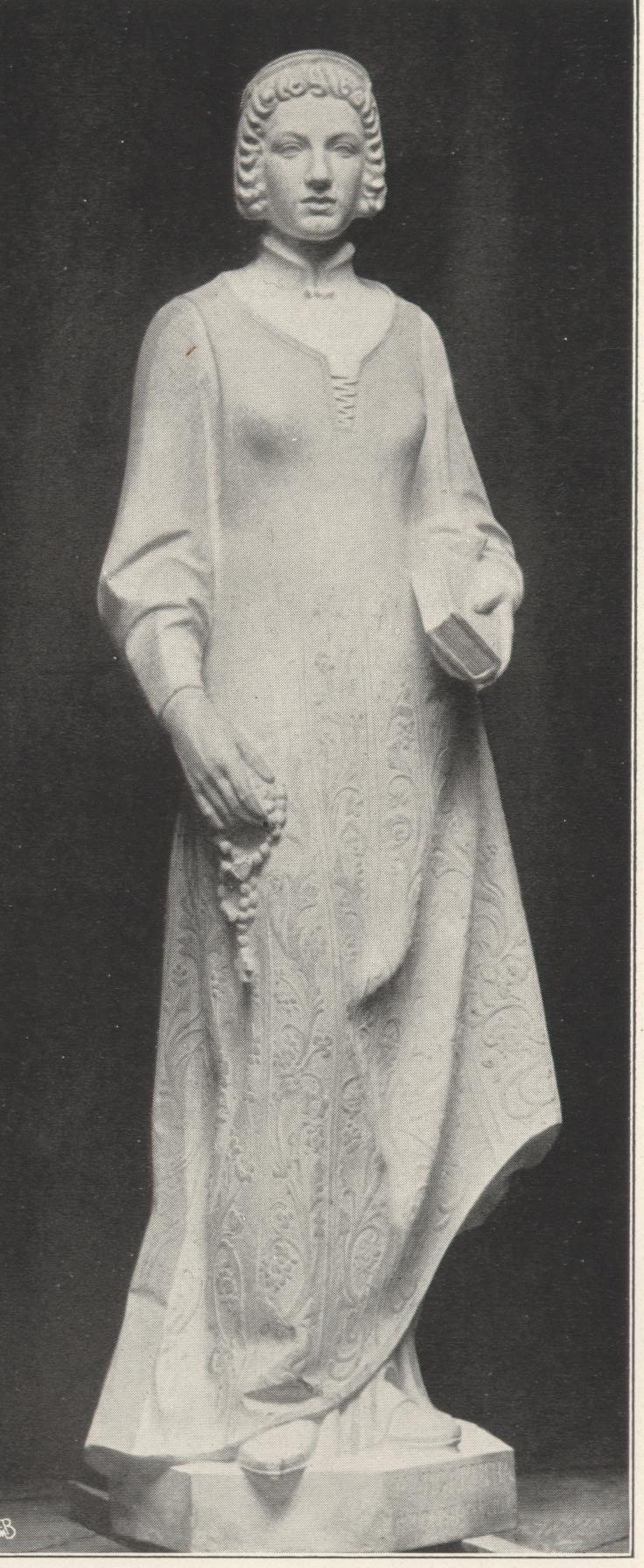
- Sculpture by Hubert Netzer

Countess Palatine of the Rhine
- Tenure: 1348 - 1353
- Born: 1331; Palermo, Kingdom of Sicily
- Died: 1377 (aged 45–46); Neustadt, Holy Roman Empire
- Spouse: Rudolf II, Count Palatine of the Rhine
- House: Barcelona
- Father: Frederick III of Sicily
- Mother: Eleanor of Anjou

Margaret of Sicily or Margherita di Sicilia-Aragona (1331 in Palermo – 1377 in Neustadt) was a Sicilian princess, daughter of the King Frederick III of Sicily and his wife Eleanor of Anjou. In 1348 she married Rudolf II, Count Palatine of the Rhine, and was Countess Palatine of the Rhine until 1353, year of the husband's death.

== Life ==
Margaret was the youngest daughter of King Frederick II of Sicily-Aragon (1272-1337) and Eleanore, daughter of Charles II of Anjou. Her parents resided in Palermo, where she presumably was born.

In 1348 Margaret married the widowed Count Palatine Rudolf II from the house of Wittelsbach, who lived in Neustadt an der Weinstraße. The marriage of Rudolf II and Margaret of Sicily-Aragon remained childless.
