= Duchy of Neopatras =

Medieval Greek duchy (1319–1390)

Coordinates: 38.6517°N 22.3059°E

- 1319–1390
- Coat of arms of the Duchy of Neopatras; Argent, a saltire gules between four crosses couped of the second

- Status: Under the suzerainty of the Kingdom of Sicily, after itself part of Crown of Aragon
- Capital: Neopatras
- Common languages: Greek popularly
- Religion: Roman Catholic officially, Greek Orthodox popularly
- Government: Feudal duchy
- Historical era: Middle Ages
  - Sicilian capture of Neopatras by Frederick Alfonso of Sicily: 1319
  - Neopatras conquered by Nerio I Acciaioli: 1390
Preceded by	Succeeded by
John II Doukas	Serbian Empire; Nerio I Acciaioli

The Duchy of Neopatras (Catalan: Ducat de Neopàtria; Sicilian: Ducatu di Neopatria; Greek: Δουκάτο Νέων Πατρών; Latin: Ducatus Neopatriae) was a principality in southern Thessaly, established in 1319. Officially part of the Kingdom of Sicily, itself part of the Crown of Aragon, the duchy was governed in conjunction with the neighbouring Duchy of Athens, it enjoyed a large degree of self-government. From the mid-14th century, the duchies entered a period of decline: most of the Thessalian possessions were lost to the Serbian Empire, internal dissensions arose, along with the menace of Turkish piracy in the Aegean and the onset of Ottoman expansion in the Balkans. Enfeebled, the Catalan possessions were taken over by the Florentine adventurer Nerio I Acciaioli in 1385–1390. The title of Duke of Neopatras was held by the heir of the King of Sicily.

== History ==
When the Greek ruler of Thessaly, John II Doukas, died in 1318 without an heir, his domains fell into chaos. The Almogavars of the Catalan Company, who had recently conquered most of the Duchy of Athens to the south of Thessaly, took advantage of the situation to push north. Led by Alfonso Fadrique, the Catalans took Neopatras in 1319, and by 1325 had also conquered Zetounion, Loidoriki, Siderokastron and Vitrinitsa, as well as—apparently briefly—Domokos, Gardiki and Pharsalus. The central and northern part of Thessaly remained in Greek hands under a series of local magnates, some of whom recognized Byzantine suzerainty, like Stephen Gabrielopoulos of Trikala; others, however, like the Maliasenos family around Volos, turned to the Catalans for support.

The Greek rulers of Thessaly had long, but erroneously, been known as "Dukes of Neopatras" by Western European contemporaries from their capital, modern Ypati; this was a result of confusion from the family name of Doukas, which Western Europeans mistook as the title of "duke". As a result, the territory conquered by the Catalans in Thessaly was organized as the "Duchy of Neopatras" and was divided into five captaincies. The Catalans selected the infant Manfred, son of King Frederick III of Sicily, as their duke, but actual power was wielded by the Duke's local representative, the vicar-general, as well as by the marshal (mariscalus exercitus ducatuum) as the elected head of the Company members.

Aragonese activity in Greece.

Most of the Duchy's possessions in Thessaly were lost when the region was conquered by Serbian Empire of Stefan Dušan in 1348, but Neopatras and the immediate region around it remained in Catalan hands. In 1377, the title of Duke of Athens and Neopatras was assumed by Peter IV of Aragon. It was preserved among the subsidiary titles of his successors, and was regularly included in the full title of the Spanish monarchs at least until the takeover of the Spanish crown by the House of Bourbon.

In 1378–79, the Aragonese lost most of their possessions in Boeotia to the Navarrese Company, while from the south the ambitious Florentine adventurer Nerio Acciaioli, lord of Corinth, took over Megara in 1374 and began applying pressure on Athens. By 1380, the Catalans were left only with the two capitals of Athens and Neopatras, as well as the County of Salona. Athens fell to Acciaioli in 1388, and in 1390 he captured Neopatras as well. Acciaioli could boast in the title "Lord of Corinth and of the Duchy of Athens and Neopatras", but his triumph was short-lived: in 1393/4 the Ottoman Turks conquered Neopatras and the entire Spercheios River valley.

Ecclesiastically, Neopatras largely corresponded to the Latin Archbishopric of Neopatras (L'Arquebisbat de la pàtria), which had one suffragan: Zetounion (Lamia). Among the Catalan archbishops was Ferrer d'Abella, who tried to have himself transferred to a west European see.

== Dukes of Neopatras ==
- William (1319–1338)
- John (1338–1348)
- Frederick I (1348–1355)
- Frederick II (1355–1377)
- Maria (1377–1379)
- Peter (1379–1387)

== Vicars-general ==
The vicars-general acted as local representatives of the dukes and were the governors of the twin duchy, originally for the Crown of Sicily, and after 1379 for the Crown of Aragon:

- Alfonso Fadrique (1319 – c. 1330)
- Odo of Novelles, possibly appointed pro tempore to lead the war against Walter VI of Brienne in 1331
- Nicholas Lancia (c. 1331–1335)
- Raymond Bernardi (1354–1356)
- Gonsalvo Ximénez of Arenós (1359)
- Matthew of Moncada (1359–1361)
- Peter de Pou (1361–1362)
- Roger de Llúria (1362–1369/70), de facto and unrecognized until 1366
- Gonsalvo Ximénez of Arenós (1362–1363), uncertain
- Matthew of Moncada (1363–1366), only de jure
- Matthew of Peralta (1370–1374)
- Louis Fadrique (1375–1381)
- Philip Dalmau, Viscount of Rocaberti (1379–1386, de facto only during his stay in Greece 1381–1382)
  - Raymond de Vilanova (1382–1386), deputy of Philip Dalmau after his departure from Greece
- Bernard of Cornellà (1386–1387), never actually went to Greece
- Philip Dalmau, Viscount of Rocaberti (1387–1388)
  - Peter of Pau (1386–1388), deputy of Bernard of Cornellà and then of Philip Dalmau in Greece until the fall of Athens to Nerio Acciaioli

== Sources ==
- Fine, John V. A. (1994) [1987]. The Late Medieval Balkans: A Critical Survey from the Late Twelfth Century to the Ottoman Conquest. Ann Arbor, Michigan: University of Michigan Press. ISBN 978-0-472-10079-8.
- Koder, Johannes; Hild, Friedrich (1976). Tabula Imperii Byzantini, Band 1: Hellas und Thessalia (in German). Vienna: Verlag der Österreichischen Akademie der Wissenschaften. ISBN 978-3-7001-0182-6.
- Miller, William (1908). The Latins in the Levant: A History of Frankish Greece (1204–1566). London: John Murray.
- Nicol, Donald M. (1984). The Despotate of Epiros, 1267–1479: A Contribution to the History of Greece in the Middle Ages. Cambridge: Cambridge University Press. ISBN 978-0-521-13089-9.
- Polemis, Demetrios I. (1968). The Doukai: A Contribution to Byzantine Prosopography. London: The Athlone Press.
- Setton, Kenneth M. (1975). Catalan Domination of Athens 1311–1388, Revised Edition. London: Variorum. ISBN 0-902089-77-3.
- Setton, Kenneth M. (1975). "The Catalans in Greece, 1311–1388". In Setton, Kenneth M.; Hazard, Harry W. (eds.). A History of the Crusades, Volume III: The Fourteenth and Fifteenth Centuries. Vol. 3. Madison and London: University of Wisconsin Press. pp. 167–224. ISBN 0-299-06670-3.
