= Frederick III of Sicily =

King of Sicily from 1295 to 1337

Frederick III
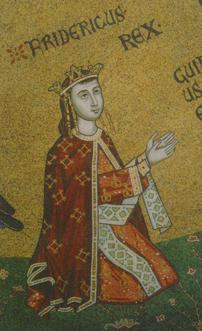
- 14th-century mosaic in the central apse of the Messina Cathedral depicting King Frederick III of Sicily

King of Sicily
- Reign: 11 December 1295 – 25 June 1337
- Coronation: 25 March 1296 (Palermo)
- Predecessor: James I
- Successor: Peter II
- Born: 13 December 1272; Barcelona, Crown of Aragon
- Died: 25 June 1337 (aged 64); Paternò, Kingdom of Sicily
- Burial: Catania Cathedral
- Spouse: Eleanor of Anjou
- Issue among others...: Peter II, King of Sicily; Manfred, Duke of Athens; Constance, Queen of Cyprus; Elisabeth, Duchess of Bavaria; William II, Duke of Athens; John, Duke of Randazzo; Margaret, Countess Palatine of the Rhine
- House: House of Barcelona
- Father: Peter III of Aragon
- Mother: Constance II of Sicily

Frederick III (also Frederick II, Latin: Federicus, Italian: Federico, Sicilian: Fidiricu); 13 December 1272 – 25 June 1337) was the regent of the Kingdom of Sicily from 1291 until 1295 and subsequently King of Sicily from 1295 until his death. He was the third son of Peter III of Aragon and served in the War of the Sicilian Vespers on behalf of his father and brothers, Alfonso ΙΙΙ and James ΙΙ. He was confirmed as king by the Peace of Caltabellotta in 1302. His reign saw important constitutional reforms: the Constitutiones regales, Capitula alia, and Ordinationes generales.

== Name ==
Although the second Frederick of Sicily, he chose to call himself "Frederick III" (being one of the rare medieval monarchs who actually used a regnal number) – presumably because only some fifty years before, his well-known and remembered great-grandfather had ruled Sicily and also used an official ordinal: Fridericus secundus, imperator etc.. Thus, Fridericus tertius was better in line with the precedent of his ancestor's ordinal. However, an anecdote attributes Frederick's choice of numeral to him being the third son of Peter. The next man called Frederick to occupy the Sicilian throne was dubbed by later generations of historians as Frederick III: Frederick the Simple, though he himself did not use an ordinal.

== Biography ==
=== Early years ===
Frederick was born in Barcelona.

When his father died in 1285, he left the Kingdom of Aragon to his eldest son, Alfonso, and that of Sicily to his second son, James. When Alfonso died in 1291, James became king of Aragon and left Frederick as regent in Sicily. The war between the Angevins, who contested the title to Sicily from their peninsular possessions centred on Naples (the so-called Kingdom of Naples), and the Crown of Aragon for the possession of the island was still in progress, and although the Crown of Aragon was successful in Italy, James’ position in Spain became very insecure due to internal troubles and French attacks. Peace negotiations were begun with Charles II of Naples, but were interrupted by the successive deaths of two popes. At last, under the auspices of Pope Boniface VIII, James concluded a treaty, by which, in exchange for being left undisturbed in the rest of the territories belonging to the Crown of Aragon and promised possession of Sardinia and Corsica, he gave up Sicily to the Church, for whom it was to be held by the Angevins (Treaty of Anagni, 10 June 1295). The Sicilians refused to be made over once more to the hated French they had expelled in 1282 (in the Sicilian Vespers), and found a national leader in the regent Frederick. In vain the pope tried to bribe him with promises and dignities; he was determined to stand by his subjects, and was crowned king by the nobles at Palermo in 1296.

When Frederick heard that James was preparing to go to war with him, he sent a messenger, Mountainer Pérez de Sosa, to Catalonia in an effort to stir up the barons and cities against James in 1298. Mountainer carried with him an Occitan poem, Ges per guerra no.m chal aver consir, intended as a communication with his supporters in Catalonia. This communiqué seems to have had in mind Ponç Hug as a recipient, for the count penned a response (under the title con d'Empuria), A l'onrat rei Frederic terz vai dir, in which he praised Frederick's tact and diplomacy, but told him bluntly that he would not abandon his sovereign. This poetic transaction is usually dated to January–March, Spring, or August 1296, but Gerónimo Zurita in the seventeenth century specifically dated the embassy of Mountainer to 1298.

=== Reign ===
Frederick reformed the administration and extended the powers of the Sicilian parliament, which was composed of the barons, the prelates, and the representatives of the towns.

His refusal to comply with the pope's injunctions led to a renewal of the war. Frederick landed in Calabria, where he seized several towns, encouraged revolt in Naples, negotiated with the Ghibellines of Tuscany and Lombardy, and assisted the house of Colonna against Pope Boniface. In the meantime, James, who received many favours from the Church, married his sister Yolanda to Robert, the third son of Charles II. Unfortunately for Frederick, a part of the Catalan-Aragonese nobles of Sicily favoured King James, and both John of Procida and Roger of Lauria, the heroes of the war of the Vespers, went over to the Angevins, and the latter completely defeated the Sicilian fleet off Capo d'Orlando. Charles's sons Robert and Philip landed in Sicily, but after capturing Catania were defeated by Frederick, Philip being taken prisoner (1299), while several Calabrian towns were captured by the Sicilians.

For two years more the fighting continued with varying success, until Charles of Valois, who had been sent by Boniface to invade Sicily, was forced to sue for peace, his army being decimated by disease. In August 1302 the Treaty of Caltabellotta was signed, by which Frederick was recognised king of Trinacria (the name Sicily was not to be used) for his lifetime, and was to marry Eleanor of Anjou, daughter of Charles II of Naples and Maria Arpad of Hungary. At Frederick's death, the kingdom was to revert to the Angevins (this clause was inserted chiefly to allow Charles to save face) and Frederick's children would receive compensation elsewhere. Boniface tried to induce King Charles to break the treaty, but the latter was only too anxious for peace. Finally, in May 1303, the pope ratified the treaty, albeit with changes and additions, which included Frederick agreeing to pay him a tribute.

For a few years Sicily enjoyed peace, and the kingdom was reorganised. However, on the descent of the emperor Henry VII, Holy Roman Emperor into Italy, Frederick entered into an alliance with him, and in violation of the pact of Caltabellotta made war on the Angevins again (1313) and captured Reggio. He set sail for Tuscany to cooperate with the emperor, but on the latter's death he returned to Sicily. Robert, who had succeeded Charles II in 1309, made several raids into the island, which suffered much material injury. A truce was concluded in 1317, but as the Sicilians had helped the Lombard Ghibellines in the attack on Genoa, and Frederick had seized some Church revenues for military purposes, Pope John XXII excommunicated him and placed the island under an interdict (1321) which lasted until 1335. An Angevin fleet and army, under Robert's son Charles, was defeated at Palermo by Giovanni da Chiaramonte in 1325, and in 1326 and 1327 there were further Angevin raids on the island, until the descent into Italy of the next Holy Roman Emperor Louis the Bavarian distracted their attention. The election of Pope Benedict XII (1334), who was friendly to Frederick, promised a respite; but after fruitless negotiations the war broke out once more, and Chiaramonte went over to Robert, owing to a private feud.

In 1337 Frederick died at Paternò, and in spite of the Peace of Caltabellotta his son Peter II of Sicily succeeded him.

== Family ==
From his marriage (1303) with Eleanor of Anjou were born:

- Peter (1304–1342), successor.
- Roger (1305–died young).
- Manfred (1306–1317), Duke of Athens and Neopatria.
- Constance (1307 – after 19 June 1344), married in 1317 to Henry II of Cyprus; on 29 December 1331 to Leo IV of Armenia; and in 1343 to John of Lusignan, brother of Peter I of Cyprus. She died childless.
- Elisabeth (1310–1349), married (1328) Stephen II of Bavaria.
- William (1312–1338), Prince of Taranto, Duke of Athens and Neopatria.
- John (1317–1348), Duke of Randazzo, Duke of Athens and Neopatria, Regent of Sicily (from 1338).
- Catherine (1320–1342), Abbess of Santa Chiara at Messina.
- Margaret (1331–1377), married (1348) Rudolf II of the Palatinate.

== Sources ==
- Bozzo, Stefano V. (1882), Note storiche siciliane del secolo XIV. Avvenimenti e guerre che seguirono il Vespro, dalla pace di Caltabellotta alla morte di re Federico II l'Aragonese (1302–1337), Palermo
- Backman, Clifford R. (1995), The Decline and Fall of Medieval Sicily: Politics, Religion, and Economy in the Reign of Frederick III, 1296–1337, Cambridge: Cambridge University Press
- Colletta, Pietro (2007), "Saggio critico di aggiornamento bibliografico", Declino e caduta della Sicilia medievale. Politica, religione ed economia nel regno di Federico III d'Aragona Rex Siciliae (1296-1337), by Clifford R. Backman, translated by Iole Turco, Palermo: Officina di Studi Medievali, pp. 333–364, ISBN 978-88-88615-65-3, archived from the original on 2023-04-18 (a comprehensive bibliography of Frederick III's reign up to 2007)
- Riquer, Martí (1975), Los trovadores: historia literaria y textos, Barcelona: Planeta (3 vols.)
- Hohenstaufen, Frederick II (1961). The Art of Falconry. Translated by Wood, Casey A.; Fyfe, F. Marjorie. Stanford University Press.

Frederick III of Sicily House of Barcelona Born: 13 December 1272 Died: 25 June 1337
Regnal titles
Preceded by James	King of Sicily; 1296–1337	Succeeded by Peter II
