= Duchy of Athens =

State in southern Greece (1205–1458)

Duchy of Athens Δουκᾶτον Ἀθηνῶν (Greek) Ducat d'Atenes (Catalan)
- 1205–1458
- Arms of the Duchy under the de la Roche (first dynasty)

- The Lordship of Athens and the other Greek and Latin states of southern Greece, c. 1210
- Status: Vassal state (Note: The duchy was a vassal of, in order, the Kingdom of Thessalonica, the Kingdom of Sicily, the Crown of Aragon, the Republic of Venice, the Despotate of the Morea and the Ottoman Empire) of various countries, de facto autonomous
- Capital: Athens, Thebes; 38°0′14″N 23°43′1.6″E
- Common languages: French (until 1311); Catalan (1311–88); Greek (popularly, then officially after 1388)
- Religion: Catholic Church (state religion); Greek Orthodoxy (popularly)
- Government: Feudal monarchy
- Duke
  - 1205-1225: Othon de la Roche (first)
  - 1455-1458: Francesco II Acciaioli (last)
- Historical era: Middle Ages
  - Fourth Crusade: 1204
  - Duchy established: 1205
  - Aragonese conquest: 1311
  - Acciaioli rule: 1388
  - Tributary to Morea: 1444
  - Ottoman conquest: 1458
- Currency: Denier tournois
Preceded by	Succeeded by
Byzantine Empire	Ottoman Empire
- Today part of: Greece

The Duchy of Athens (Greek: Δουκᾶτον Ἀθηνῶν, Doukaton Athinon; Catalan: Ducat d'Atenes) was one of the Crusader states set up in Greece after the conquest of the Byzantine Empire during the Fourth Crusade as part of the process known as Frankokratia, encompassing the regions of Attica and Boeotia. Its history can be divided into three periods: the rule of the French de la Roche dynasty (1205–1311), the Catalan dominion (1311–1388) and finally the rule of the Italian Acciaioli (1388–1458), which came to a close with the Ottoman conquest in 1458.

== History ==
=== Establishment of the Duchy ===
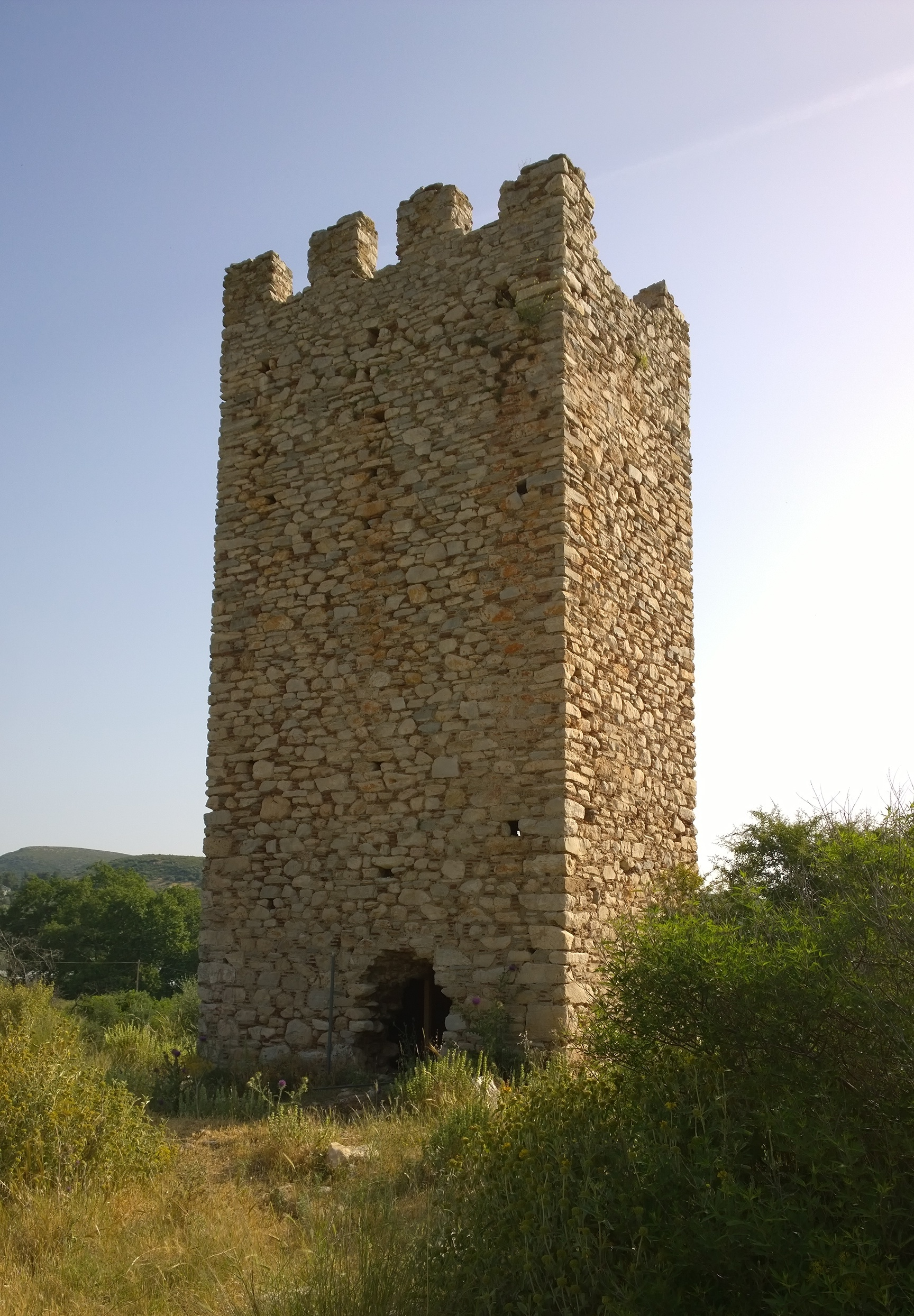
13th century Frankish tower at Oinoi

The first duke of Athens (as well as of Thebes, at first) was Otto de la Roche, a minor Burgundian knight of the Fourth Crusade. Although he was known as the "Duke of Athens" from the foundation of the duchy in 1205, the title did not become official until 1260. Instead, Otto proclaimed himself "Lord of Athens" (in Latin Dominus Athenarum, in French Sire d'Athenes). The local Greeks called the dukes "Megas Kyris" (Greek: Μέγας Κύρης, "Great Lord"), from which the shortened form "Megaskyr", often used even by the Franks to refer to the Duke of Athens, is derived.

Athens was originally a vassal state of the Kingdom of Thessalonica, but after Thessalonica was captured in 1224 by Theodore, the Despot of Epirus, the Principality of Achaea claimed suzerainty over Athens, a claim disputed by the de la Roche in the War of the Euboeote Succession. Like the rest of Latin Greece, however, the Duchy recognized the suzerainty of Charles I of Sicily after the Treaties of Viterbo in 1267.

The Duchy occupied the Attic peninsula as well as Boeotia and extended partially into Thessaly, sharing an undefined border with Thessalonica and then Epirus. It did not hold the islands of the Aegean Sea, which were Venetian territories, but exercised influence over the Latin Triarchy of Negroponte. The buildings of the Acropolis in Athens served as the palace for the dukes.

=== Catalan conquest ===
Coat of arms of Aragon.

The Duchy was held by the family of la Roche until 1308, when it passed to Walter V of Brienne. Walter hired the Catalan Company, a group of mercenaries founded by Roger de Flor, to fight against the Byzantine successor state of Epirus, but when he tried to dismiss and cheat them of their pay in 1311, they slew him and the bulk of the Frankish nobility at the Battle of Halmyros and took over the Duchy. Walter's son Walter VI of Brienne retained only the lordship of Argos and Nauplia, where his claims to the Duchy were still recognized.

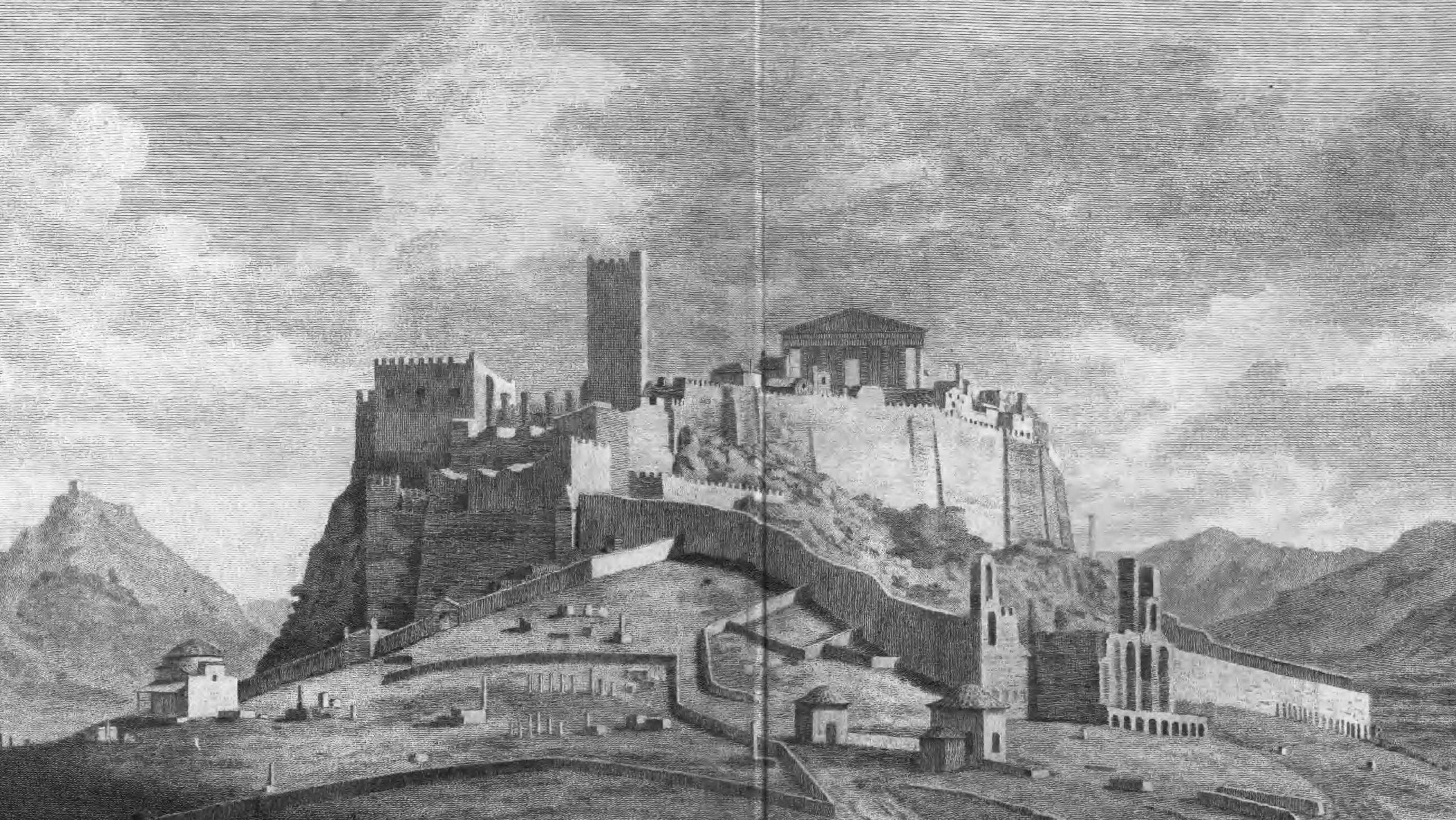
The Acropolis of Athens in the mid-18th century. The visible fortifications, eventually demolished in the mid-19th century, date back to the de la Roche and Acciaioli periods.

In 1312, the Catalans recognized the suzerainty of King Frederick III of Sicily, who appointed his son Manfred as Duke. The ducal title remained in the hands of the Crown of Aragon until 1388, but actual authority was exercised by a series of vicars-general. In 1318/19 the Catalans conquered Siderokastron and the south of Thessaly as well, and created the Duchy of Neopatras, united to Athens. Part of Thessaly was conquered from the Catalans by the Serbian Empire in the 1340s.

Aragonese activity in Greece.

Under Catalan rule, the feudal system continued to exist, not anymore under the Assizes of Romania, but under the Customs of Barcelona, and the official common language was now Catalan instead of French. Each city and district—on the example of Sicily—had its own local governor (veguer, castlà, capità), whose term of office was fixed at three years and who was nominated by the Duke, the vicar-general or the local representatives. The principal towns and villages were represented by the síndic, which had their own councils and officers. Judges and notaries were elected for life or even inherited offices.

=== Decline and fall ===
In 1379 the Navarrese Company, in the service of the Latin emperor James of Baux, conquered Thebes and part of the Duchy of Neopatras. Meanwhile, the Catalan kept another part of Neopatras and Attica.

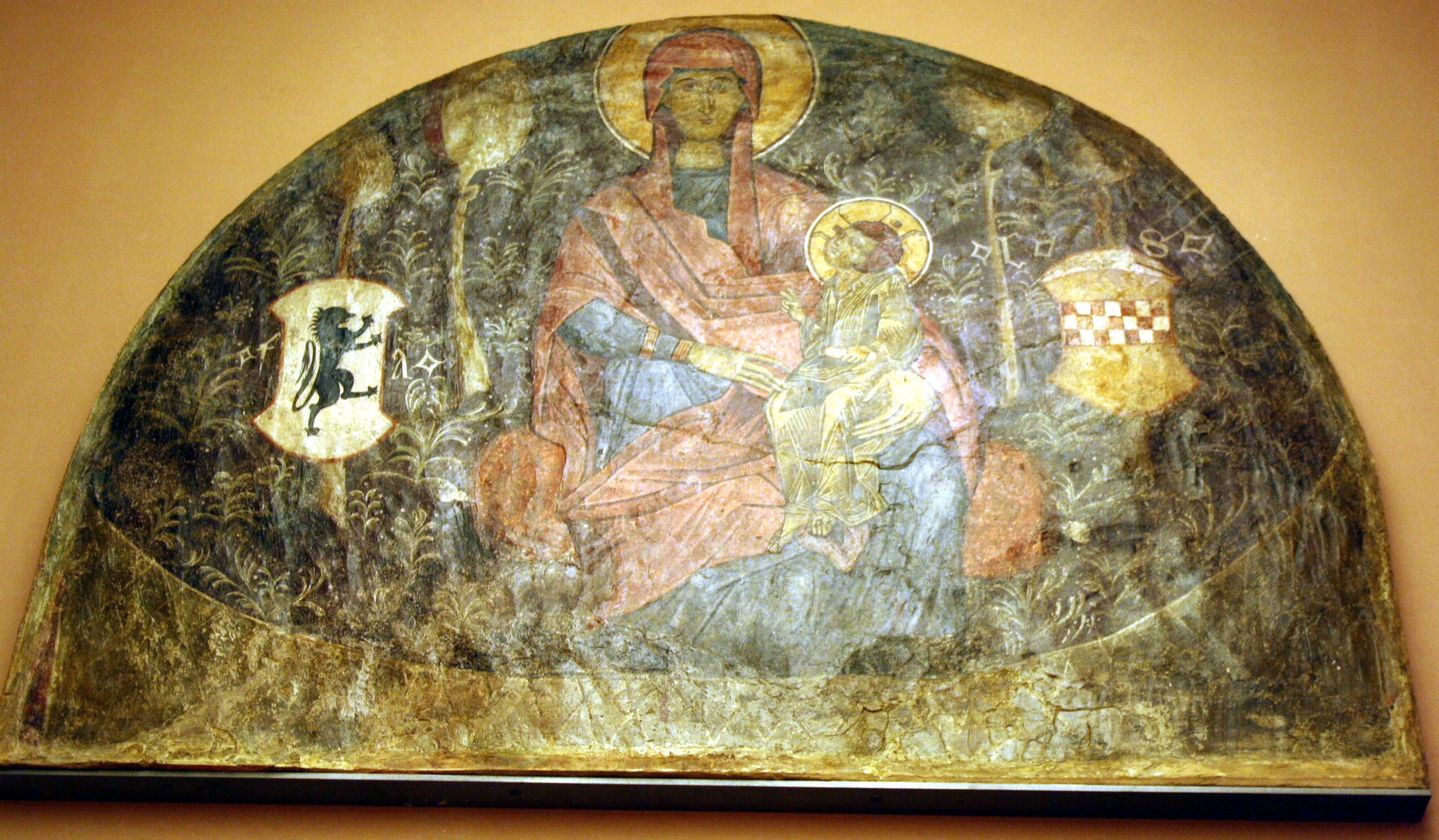
Painting of the Theotokos commissioned during the reign of Francesco I (1451–1454). From the St. Elias church in Athens, demolished in 1849.

After 1381 the Duchy was ruled by the Kings of Sicily until 1388 when the Acciaioli family of Florence captured Athens. Neopatras was occupied in 1390.

From 1395 to 1402 the Venetians briefly controlled the Duchy. In 1444 Athens became a tributary of Constantine Palaeologus, the Despot of Morea and heir to the Byzantine throne. In 1456, after the Fall of Constantinople (1453) to the Ottoman Empire, Turahanoğlu Ömer Bey conquered the remnants of the Duchy. Despite the Ottoman conquest, the title of "Duke of Athens and Neopatras" continued in use by the Kings of Sicily, and through them by the Kings of Spain, up to the present day.

== The Catholic Church in the Duchy of Athens ==
Athens was the seat of a metropolitan archdiocese within the Patriarchate of Constantinople when it was conquered by the Franks. The seat, however, was not of importance, being the twenty-eighth in precedence in the Byzantine Empire. Nonetheless, it had produced the prominent clergyman Michael Choniates. It was a metropolitan see (province or eparchy) with eleven suffragans at the time of conquest: Euripus, Daulia, Coronea, Andros, Oreos, Scyrus, Karystos, Porthmus, Aulon, Syra and Seriphus, and Ceos and Thermiae (or Cythnus). The structure of the Orthodox church was not significantly changed by the new rulers, and Pope Innocent III confirmed the first Latin Archbishop of Athens, Berard, in all his Greek predecessors' rights and jurisdictions. Antonio Ballester, an educated Catalan, had a successful career in Greece as archbishop.

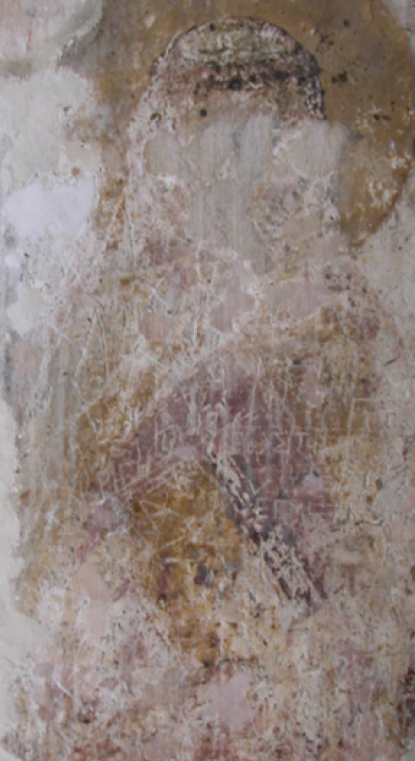
A Catholic monk holding the bible on a wall painting from the Omorphe Ekklesia church, Athens (c. 1300)

The Parthenon, which had been the Orthodox church of the Theotokos Atheniotissa, became the Catholic Church of Saint Mary of Athens. The Greek-Orthodox church survived as an underground institution without official sanction by the new governing Catholic authorities..

The Archdiocese of Thebes also lay within the Athenian duchy. Unlike Athens, it had no suffragans. However, the Latin archbishopric produced several significant figures as archbishops, such as Simon Atumano. It had a greater political role than Athens because it was situated in the later capital of the duchy at Thebes. Under the Catalans, the Athenian diocese had expanded its jurisdiction to thirteen suffragans, but only the dioceses of Megara, Daulia, Salona, and Boudonitza lay within the duchy itself. The archiepiscopal offices of Athens and Thebes were held by Frenchmen and Italians until the late fourteenth century, when Catalan or Aragonese people began to fill them.

== Dukes of Athens ==
=== De la Roche family ===
The dukes of the De la Roche family from La Roche were of Burgundian origin.

- Otto (1205–1225)
- Guy I (1225–1263)
- John I (1263–1280)
- William I (1280–1287)
- Guy II (1287–1308)

=== Briennist claimants ===
The Athenian parliament elected the count of Brienne to succeed Guy, but his tenure was brief and he was killed in battle by the Catalans. His wife briefly had control of the city, too. The heirs of Brienne continued to claim the duchy, but were recognised only in the Lordship of Argos and Nauplia.

- Walter V of Brienne (1308–1311)
- Joanna of Châtillon (1311–1354)
- Walter VI of Brienne (1311–1356)
- Isabella of Brienne (1356–1360)
- Sohier of Enghien (1356–1367)
- Walter IV of Enghien (1367–1381)
- Louis of Enghien (1381–1394)

=== Catalan domination ===
The conquest of the duchy by the Catalan Company and subsequent annexation to Aragon came after a disputed succession following the death of the last Burgundian duke. The Catalans recognised the king of Sicily as suzerain and this left the duchy often as an appanage in the hands of younger sons and under vicars general.

- Roger Deslaur (1311–1312)
- Manfred (1312–1317)
- William II (1317–1338)
- John II (1338–1348)
- Frederick I (1348–1355)
- Frederick II (1355–1377)
- Maria (1377–1379)
- Peter IV (1379–1387)

==== Catalan vicars-general ====
These were the vicars-general of the Crown of Sicily, and after 1379 of the Crown of Aragon.

- Berenguer Estañol (1312–1316)
- Alfonso Fadrique (1317 – ca. 1330)
- Odo of Novelles, possibly appointed pro tempore to lead the war against Walter VI of Brienne in 1331
- Nicholas Lancia (ca. 1331–1335)
- Raymond Bernardi (1354–1356)
- Gonsalvo Ximénez of Arenós (1359)
- Matthew of Moncada (1359–1361)
- Peter de Pou (1361–1362)
- Roger de Llúria (1362–1369/70), de facto and unrecognized until 1366
- Gonsalvo Ximénez of Arenós (1362–1363), uncertain
- Matthew of Moncada (1363–1366), only de jure
- Matthew of Peralta (1370–1374)
- Louis Fadrique (1375–1382)
- Philip Dalmau, Viscount of Rocaberti (1379–1386, de facto only during his stay in Greece 1381–1382)
  - Raymond de Vilanova (1382–1386), deputy of Philip Dalmau after his departure from Greece
- Bernard of Cornellà (1386–1387), never actually went to Greece
- Philip Dalmau, Viscount of Rocaberti (1387–1388)
  - Peter of Pau (1386–1388), deputy of Bernard of Cornellà and then of Philip Dalmau in Greece until the fall of Athens to Nerio Acciaioli

=== Acciaioli family ===
The Florentine Acciaioli (or Acciajuoli) governed the duchy from their removal of the Catalans, with the assistance of the Navarrese. While Nerio willed the city and duchy to Venice, it returned to the Florentines until the Ottoman conquest.

- Nerio I (1388–1394)
- Antonio I (1394–1395)
- Venetian control (1395–1402), under podestàs:
  - Albano Contarini (1395–1397)
  - Lorenzo Venier (1397–1399)
  - Ermoaldo Contarini (1399–1400)
  - Nicolo Vitturi (1400–1402)
- Antonio I (1402–1435), restored
- Nerio II (1435–1439)
- Antonio II (1439–1441)
- Nerio II (1441–1451), restored
- Claire (1451–1454)
  - with Bartolomeo Contarini (1451–1454)
- Francesco I (1451–1454)
- Francesco II (1455–1458)

== Sources ==
- Fine, John V. A. (1994) [1987]. The Late Medieval Balkans: A Critical Survey from the Late Twelfth Century to the Ottoman Conquest. Ann Arbor, Michigan: University of Michigan Press. ISBN 978-0-472-10079-8.
- Miller, William (1908). The Latins in the Levant: A History of Frankish Greece (1204–1566). London: John Murray.
- Setton, Kenneth M. (1975). Catalan Domination of Athens 1311–1380 (Revised ed.). London: Variorum.
- Setton, Kenneth M. (1975). "The Catalans in Greece, 1311–1388". In Setton, Kenneth M.; Hazard, Harry W. (eds.). A History of the Crusades, Volume III: The Fourteenth and Fifteenth Centuries. Vol. 3. Madison and London: University of Wisconsin Press. pp. 167–224. ISBN 0-299-06670-3.
- Setton, Kenneth M. (1975). "The Catalans and Florentines in Greece, 1311–1462". In Setton, Kenneth M.; Hazard, Harry W. (eds.). A History of the Crusades, Volume III: The Fourteenth and Fifteenth Centuries. Vol. 3. Madison and London: University of Wisconsin Press. pp. 225–277. ISBN 0-299-06670-3.
