= Wisconsin Collaborative History of the Crusades =

The Wisconsin Collaborative History of the Crusades is a six-volume set on the Crusades through the 16th century, published from 1969 to 1989. The work was a major collaborative effort under the general editorship of American medieval historian Kenneth M. Setton. Begun at the University of Pennsylvania in 1950, the work was finished at the University of Wisconsin, and is generally known as the Wisconsin History. Setton oversaw the work of over sixty specialists, covering 98 topics on the full gamut of Crusader studies, reflecting of the concurrent state of the knowledge, with timelines, gazetteers and indexes. The work may be today regarded as uneven in parts and at times dated, but remains as an important resource in the study of the various aspects of crusading history, with fine maps, bibliographies and toponymic details.

The contents of the Wisconsin Collaborative History are as follows.

- Volume I. The First One Hundred Years (1969). Edited by Marshall W. Baldwin. Western Europe, Byzantium, the Assassins and the Holy Land before the Crusades. The First Crusade, the Crusade of 1101, the kingdom of Jerusalem from 1101 to 1146, with the loss of Edessa. The Second Crusade and afterward. The rise of Saladin and the loss of Jerusalem.
- Volume II. The Later Crusades, 1189–1311 (1969). Edited by Robert L. Wolff and Harry W. Hazard. The Norman kingdom of Sicily. The Third Crusade. The Fourth Crusade. The Latin Empire of Constantinople and the Frankish states in Greece. The Albigensian Crusade. The Children's Crusade. The Fifth Crusade. The Sixth Crusade. The Baron's Crusade. The Crusades of Louis IX. The Ayyubids. The Mongols. The Mamluks.
- Volume III. The Fourteenth and Fifteen Centuries (1975). Edited by Harry W. Hazard. Crusades in the fourteenth century. Byzantium and the Crusades. The Morea. The Catalans and Florentines in Greece. The Hospitallers at Rhodes. The kingdom of Cyprus. The Reconquista. The Mamluks. The Mongols. The German Crusade in the Baltics. The Crusade against the Hussites.
- Volume IV. The Art and Architecture of the Crusader States (1979). Edited by Harry W. Hazard. Life in Palestine and Syria. Pilgrimages and shrines. Ecclesiastical art. Military architecture. Arts in the Latin Kingdom of Jerusalem, Cyprus and Rhodes.
- Volume V. The Impact of the Crusades on the Near East (1985). Edited by Norman P. Zacour and Harry W. Hazard. Impact on Muslim lands. Social classes. Political and ecclesiastical organization of the Crusader States. Agriculture. Teutonic Knights. Venice and the Crusades. Missions to the East.
- Volume VI. The Impact of the Crusades on Europe (1989). Edited by Norman P. Zacour and Harry W. Hazard. Legal and political theory. Crusader propaganda. Financing. Institutions of the kingdom of Cyprus. Social evolution in Latin Greece. The Ottoman Turks. The Crusade of Varna. Coinage.
- Select Bibliography on the Crusades. Compiled by Hans E. Mayer and Joyce McLellan. Edited by Harry W. Hazard.
- Timeline of the Crusades, 1049–1571.

Writing in the foreword, Setton described the work as being originally devised by Dana C. Munro whose ambition was to write a comprehensive history of the Crusades. The inception was realized by students of Munro's, including Frederic Duncalf, together with John L. LaMonte and German historian August C. Krey. Duncalf and Steven Runciman would later write the key chapters on the First Crusade. They were joined by such historians as Aziz S. Atiya, Marshall W. Baldwin, T. S. R. Boase, Claude Cahen, H. A. R. Gibb, Philip K. Hitti, Urban T. Holmes, Jr., Joan Mervyn Hussey, Bernard Lewis, Sidney Painter, Joshua Prawer, Jean Richard, Denis Sinor, Joseph Reese Strayer, Robert L. Wolff and Norman P. Zacour in writing the comprehensive history.

The origins of the need for such a history is discussed by LaMonte in his Some Problems in Crusading Historiography. LaMonte's leadership on the project ended with his death in 1949, and the lead was assumed by Setton at the University of Pennsylvania in 1950. The Wisconsin History, Runciman's A History of the Crusades, and René Grousset's Histoire des croisades are the three works that rank as being monumental by 20th century standards, according to The Routledge Companion to the Crusades.
