= Francesco Acciaioli =

Francesco Acciaioli may refer to:

- Francesco I Acciaioli, Duke of Athens
- Francesco II Acciaioli (died 1460), Duke of Athens
