= Bartolomea Acciaioli =

Despoina of the Morea

Despoina of the Morea
- Tenure: 1385 – c. 1396
- Died: c. 1396
- Spouse: Theodore I Palaiologos
- Noble family: Acciaioli
- Father: Nerio I Acciaioli
- Mother: Agnes de' Saraceni

Bartolomea Acciaioli or Acciajuoli (died c. 1396) was the wife of Theodore I Palaiologos, Despot of the Morea from 1385. She was the elder daughter of Nerio I Acciaioli, who held large estates in Frankish Greece. She was famed for her beauty and her father married her to Theodore to secure an alliance. As relations between her father and husband soured in the early 1390s, he effectively disinherited her in favour of her sister, Francesca, and illegitimate brother, Antonio. Bartolomea died childless.

== Early life ==
Principal sites on the Peloponnese in the Middle Ages (Bartolomea's father held Attica and the neighboring regions, her husband the southeastern regions of the peninsula)

Bartolomea was the elder of two daughters born to Nerio I Acciaioli and Agnes de' Saraceni, who married before 1381. Nerio, a member of the prominent Florentine banking house of Acciaioli, settled in Frankish Greece in the 1360s and seized extensive territories, including the key town of Corinth. Agnes's father, Saraceno de' Saraceni, was a Venetian citizen residing in Negroponte. Little is known of Bartolomea's life, though the Byzantine historian Laonikos Chalkokondyles described her as "said to be the most beautiful of all the women then famed for their beauty". With no legitimate brothers, she was regarded as the principal heir to her father's vast estates.

== Despoina ==
In 1385, Nerio Acciaioli married Bartolomea to Theodore I Palaiologos, the Byzantine despot of Morea, cementing their alliance against the Navarrese Company, a band of mercenaries who had settled in the Peloponnese in the 1370s. Before the marriage, Nerio pledged that Bartolomea would inherit Corinth on his death. Theodore was devoted to his beautiful wife, and she remained loyal to him, but their marriage produced no children. Relations between Nerio and Theodore grew strained after the Navarrese captured Nerio in 1389. He was released only after promising to persuade Theodore to cede the city of Argos to the Venetians. The Venetians also seized Nerio's town of Megara, agreeing to return it once they obtained Argos, but Theodore refused to surrender the city.

Nerio Acciaioli made his last will in Corinth on 17 September 1394. He effectively disinherited Bartolomea, dividing his estate between his younger daughter, Francesca, his illegitimate son, Antonio, and the Church of Saint Mary of Athens (the Parthenon). Bartolomea received only the cancellation of 9,700 ducats that her husband had borrowed from her father. Outraged, she and her husband resolved to seize Corinth when Nerio died on 25 September. The following month, Theodore attacked the town but could not prevent Francesca from taking possession. A Turkish invasion of the Morea soon forced him to abandon the campaign in early 1395. After the Turks withdrew, Bartolomea ambushed Francesca between the Isthmus of Corinth and Megara, but she escaped capture. Ultimately, in 1396, Francesca's husband, Carlo I Tocco, conceded he lacked the strength to hold Corinth and sold her claim to Theodore.

Bartolomea died c. 1396. Her husband outlived her but struggled with severe depression until his death in 1407. That same year, a large sum she had deposited in a Venetian bank was given to Theodore's brother, Manuel II Palaiologos.

== Sources ==
- Fine, John V. A. (1994). The Late Medieval Balkans: A Critical Survey from the Late Twelfth Century to the Ottoman Conquest. The University of Michigan Press. ISBN 0-472-08260-4.
- Lock, Peter (1995). The Franks in the Aegean, 1204–1500. Longman. ISBN 0-582-05140-1.
- Setton, Kenneth M. (1975). "The Catalans and Florentines in Greece, 1380–1462". In Setton, Kenneth M.; Hazard, Harry W. (eds.). The History of the Crusades, Volume Three: The Fourteenth and Fifteenth Centuries. The University of Wisconsin Press. pp. 225–277. ISBN 0-299-06670-3.
- Runciman, Steven (1980). The Lost Capital of Byzantium: The History of Mistra and the Peloponnese. Harvard University Press. ISBN 978-0-674-03405-1.
- Zečević, Nada (2014). The Tocco of the Greek Realm: Nobility, Power and Migration in Latin Greece (14th-15th centuries). Makart. ISBN 978-86-87115-11-8.
