= Chiara Zorzi =

Duchess of Athens

Chiara Zorzi or Giorgio, also Clara or Claire (died 1454), was duchess consort of Athens by marriage to Nerio II Acciaioli, Duke of Athens, and regent of Athens during the minority of her son Francesco I from 1451 until 1454.

== Life ==
She was the daughter of Nicholas III Zorzi, the titular margrave of Bodonitsa, and renowned for her beauty. After Nerio's death, she secured her right to act as guardian of her son and thereby regent of the Duchy and had the Ottomans consent to it.

Not long after she came to power, she fell in love with the Venetian Bartolomeo Contarini, who visited Athens, and asked him to propose to her. He explained that he was already married, but to make himself able to marry Chiara, he returned to Venice, and murdered his wife, after which he returned to Athens and married the regent, in 1453. As her spouse, he also took a share in her government.

The Athenians were not happy about the Venetian influence, and complaints reached the Ottoman Sultan. Evidently, the citizenry mistrusted the two lovers' influence over the young duke, for whose safety they may have feared. Mehmet II of the Ottoman Empire intervened at the insistence of the people on the behalf of the young duke Francis, and summoned Bartolomeo and his stepson the duke to his court at Adrianople. Duke Francesco I was never heard of again.

Another Acciaioli, the young duke's cousin Francesco II, was sent to Athens as a Turkish client duke and Chiara thus deprived of her power in the city. The new duke had Chiara murdered at Megara. According to legend, the murder took place in the monastery of Daphni, the mausoleum of the French dukes, where he cut off her head himself while she knelt invoking the aid of the Holy Virgin, but this is a fictionalized version from a folk lore of the murder. Bartolomeo appealed to the sultan for justice. Athens was taken into Turkish hands, and Francis II deposed.

== Sources ==
- Setton, Kenneth M. (1975). "The Catalans in Greece, 1311–1388". In Setton, Kenneth M.; Hazard, Harry W. (eds.). A History of the Crusades, Volume III: The Fourteenth and Fifteenth Centuries. Vol. 3. Madison and London: University of Wisconsin Press. pp. 167–224. ISBN 0-299-06670-3.
- Setton, Kenneth M. Catalan Domination of Athens 1311–1380. Revised edition. Variorum: London, 1975.
