= Nerio Acciaioli =

Nerio Acciaioli is the name of:

- Nerio I Acciaioli (died 1394), Italian aristocrat
- Nerio II Acciaioli (1416–1451), Duke of Athens
