= Antonio I Acciaioli =

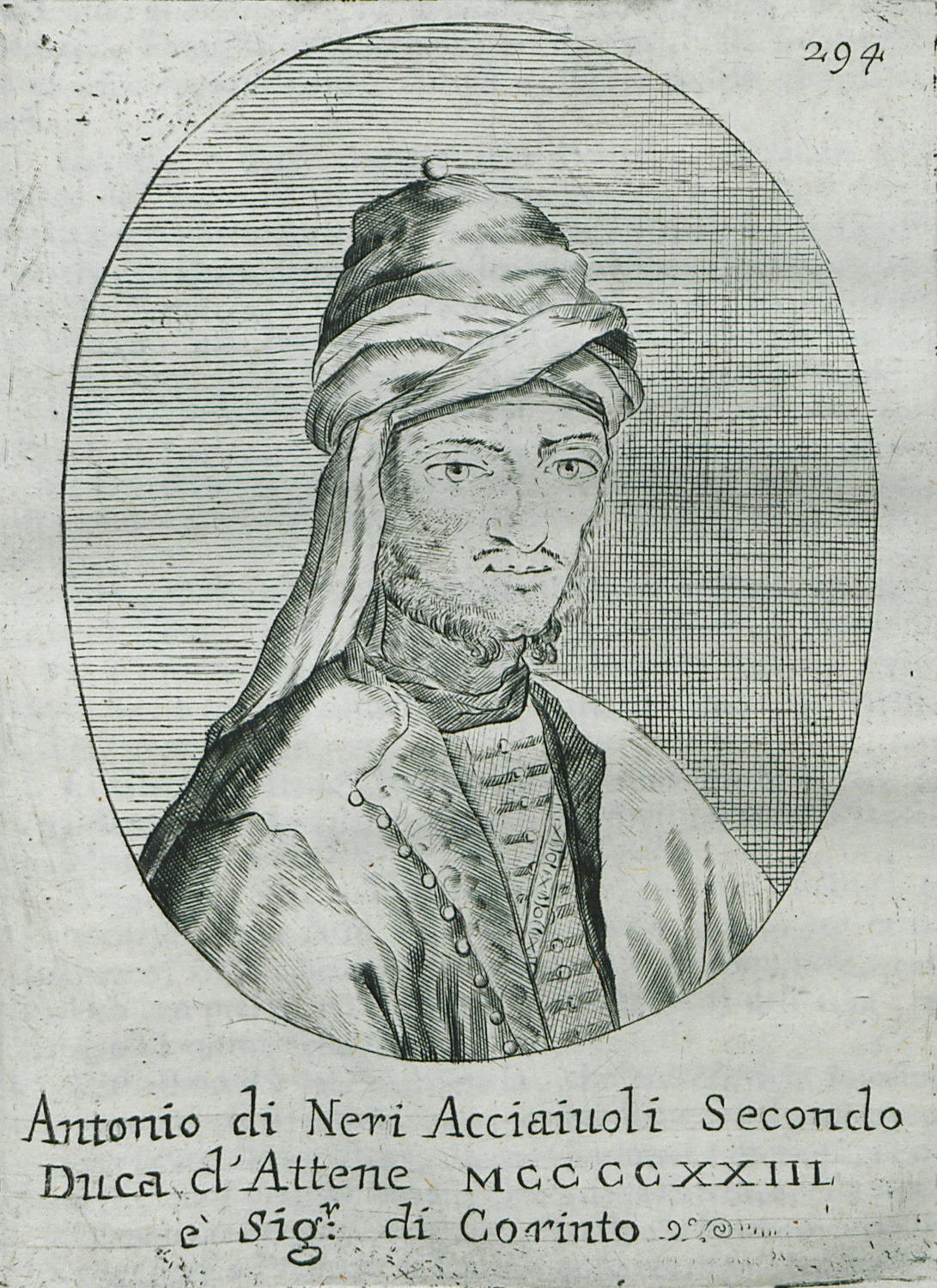
- Antonio I as depicted in a late-17th-century book

Lord/Duke of Athens
- Reign: 1403–1435
- Successor: Nerio II Acciaioli
- Died: Summer 1435
- Spouse: Helena Kalkondilla; Maria Melissena
- House: Acciaioli
- Father: Nerio I Acciaioli
- Mother: Maria Rendi (?)
- Religion: Roman Catholic

Antonio I Acciaioli, also known as Anthony I Acciaioli or Antonio I Acciajuoli (died January 1435), was Duke of Athens from 1403.

== Early life ==
Antonio was the illegitimate son of Nerio I Acciaioli. Historians Kenneth Setton and Peter Lock say that Antonio was born to Maria Rendi, but Dionysios Stathakopoulos writes that his parentage is an assumption. Her father, the Orthodox Greek Demetrius Rendi, defended Megara against Nerio Acciaioli, for which Frederick the Simple made him the hereditary chancellor of Athens in the late 1370s. Nerio's capture of Megara in 1374 or 1375 was the first step towards his conquest of the Duchy of Athens that he completed in 1388.

Nerio fathered two legitimate daughters, Bartolomea and Francesca. He gave Bartolomea in marriage to Theodore I Palaiologos, Despot of Morea, and married off Francesca to Carlo I Tocco, Count Palatine of Cephalonia and Zakynthos. Francesca was sent to Euboea (or Negroponte) as hostage to guarantee Nerio's support for Venice against Theodore I Palaiologos in 1390. Stathakopoulos proposes that Antonio may have replaced Francesca as hostage, but he was released in less than 18 months. King Ladislaus of Naples granted the Duchy of Athens to Nerio and his legitimate male heirs on 11 January 1394.

== Lord of Thebes ==
Nerio I Acciaioli made his last will on 17 September 1394. He bequeathed two important castles in Boeotia, Livadeia and Thebes, to Antonio, but willed most of his domains to Francesca and left the town of Athens to the Church of Saint Mary on the Acropolis of Athens. He died on 25 September. Bartolomea and her husband did not respect her father's testament and claimed Corinth from Francesca. Antonio, who supported their claim, joined Theodore I's military campaign against Francesca's domains and they laid siege to Corinth.

A small Ottoman Turk force attacked the Acropolis of Athens and Nerio's brother, Donato, who had inherited the title of Duke of Athens, was in no position to defend the town. The castellan of the Acropolis, Matthew of Montona, sought assistance from Andrea Bembo, the Venetian Bailo of Negroponte, offering the town to Venice. Bembo sent troops to the Acropolis before the end of the year and the Senate of Venice approved his action, acknowledging the annexation of Athens on 18 March 1395. Carlo I Tocco realized that he could not defend his wife's domains against the united forces of Theodore I and Antonio. He first offered to sell Corinth and Megara to Venice, but after the Senate hesitated to accept the offer, he sold both towns to Theodore I in 1396. The Ottomans launched a new invasion of Greece in 1397, plundering the villages in Boeotia and Attica. Thereafter, the Venetians regarded Antonio as the Ottomans' close ally.

== Duke of Athens ==
Antonio made a surprise attack against Attica and captured the lower town of Athens in the first half of 1402. To force him to abandon the siege of the Acropolis, the Senate of Venice ordered Francesco Bembo, Bailo of Negroponte, to invade Boeotia on 22 August. Instead of lifting the siege, Antonio divided his troops in two groups and ambushed the Venetians in a mountain pass, also capturing Bembo before 2 September. Antonio soon returned to Athens to continue the siege of the Acropolis. Fearing an Ottoman invasion, the Senate of Venice appointed Tommaso Mocenigo to take over the command of Negroponte and to start negotiations with Antonio. Antonio refused to make peace and forced the defenders of the Acropolis to surrender in January or February 1403.

Timur Lenk had annihilated the army of the Ottoman Sultan Bayezid I in the Battle of Ankara on 28 July 1403. Bayezid's eldest son, Süleyman Çelebi, escaped from the battlefield and returned to Adrianople to rule the European territories of the Ottoman Empire. Both Antonio and the Venetians approached him, Antonio seeking the confirmation of his rule in Athens and the Venetians asking Süleyman's military assistance for the recovery of Athens. Süleyman, who needed the support of Venice, Genoa and other maritime powers against Timur Lenk, concluded an alliance with them, also promising to force Antonio to surrender Athens to Venice. However, Süleyman's war against his brothers prevented him from providing military assistance to Venice.

Antonio's kinsman Cardinal Angelo II Acciaioli persuaded Pope Innocent VII and King Ladislaus of Naples to support Antonio's case. Both Antonio and the Cardinal sent envoys to Venice to start negotiations with the representatives of the Senate. They reached a compromise on 31 March 1405. Antonio agreed to compensate Venice for the munitions seized in the Acropolis and to send a silk robe to St Mark's Basilica every Christmas. He also pledged to prevent Macarius I, Greek Orthodox Archbishop of Athens, who had supported the Ottomans, from visiting his see and to return the goods of the last Venetian governor of Athens, Nicholas Vitturi, to his heirs. In return, Venice recognized Antonio's right to rule Athens and removed a price from his head. Antonio never sent precious robes to St Mark's and failed to compensate Vitturi's heirs. He even captured a Venetian bridgehead in Attica in 1406, but Venice did not punish him.

Antonio, who styled himself as "lord of Athens, Thebes, of all the duchy and its dependencies", was the longest-ruling medieval monarch of Athens. Athens revived during his rule because he preferred it to Thebes (which had been the capital of the duchy for decades). In 1410, he joined the Ottoman Turks to devastate Venetian Nauplia. In 1419, a peace between the Turks and Venice called on Mehmed I to ask Antonio to cease harassing the Venetians. In 1423, he was at war with Theodore II of Morea and occupied Corinth.

Antonio never forgot his Florentine roots and he strove to make Athens a capital of culture by restoring monuments, patronising letters, and encouraging chivalry. On 7 August 1422, he conceded privileges to Florentine merchants in Athens. In that year, Alfonso V of Aragon asserted his claim by appointing Tommaso Beraldo, a Catalan, duke. Giovanni Acciaioli, Antonio's uncle and archbishop of Thebes, who was then in Rome, was sent to Venice to appeal the appointment of Tommaso to the senate there, but the pleas were ignored.

Antonio died still in power in January 1435 without legitimate children and his succession to the duchy was disputed between his nephews Nerio II and Antonio II and his widow (Maria Melissene?).

== Sources ==
- Fine, John V. A. Jr. (1994) [1987]. The Late Medieval Balkans: A Critical Survey from the Late Twelfth Century to the Ottoman Conquest. Ann Arbor, Michigan: University of Michigan Press. ISBN 978-0-472-10079-8.
- Lock, Peter (1995). The Franks in the Aegean, 1204–1500. Longman. ISBN 0-582-05140-1.
- Setton, Kenneth M. (1975). "The Catalans and Florentines in Greece, 1380–1462". In Setton, Kenneth M.; Hazard, Harry W. (eds.). A History of the Crusades, Volume III: The Fourteenth and Fifteenth Centuries. Vol. 3. Madison and London: University of Wisconsin Press. pp. 225–277. ISBN 978-0-2990-6670-3.
- Stathakopoulos, Dionysios (2018). "Sister, Widow, Consort, Bride: Four Latin Ladies in Greece (1330–1430)". In Lymberopoulou, Angeliki (ed.). Cross-Cultural Interaction Between Byzantium and the West, 1204–1669: Whose Mediterranean Is It Anyway?. Routledge. pp. 236–257. ISBN 978-0-8153-7267-7.
