= Demetrios I Kantakouzenos =

Byzantine official in Morea (c. 1343–1384)

- Despot of the Morea (1383)
- Born: circa 1343
- Died: 1384
- Father: Matthew Kantakouzenos
- Mother: Irene Palaiologina
- Occupation: Governor of the Morea

Demetrios I Kantakouzenos (Greek: Δημήτριος Καντακουζηνός; c. 1343 – 1384) was a governor of the Morea and the grandson of Emperor John VI Kantakouzenos. Demetrios was the son of Matthew Kantakouzenos, governor of Morea, and Irene Palaiologina. Demetrios was given the title of sebastokrator by Emperor John V Palaiologos in December 1357 and went to the Peloponnese with his father and grandfather in 1361.

One of the sons of Matthew Kantakouzenos, he disputed the succession to the Despotate of the Morea with Theodore I Palaiologos, the son of John V between 1380 and 1384. Only information for this event is a cryptic reference in the Emperor Manuel II Palaiologos' funeral oration for his brother Theodore, who remarks on the insubordination of the "son" of Matthew Kantakouzenos, who had usurped the government on the death of Manuel Kantakouzenos in 1380. The traditional view is that this son was John, not Demetrios; however, D.A. Zakythenos, a historian of the Despotate of the Peloponnese, was inclined to believe that the son was Demetrios. According to the Byzantinist Donald Nicol, "This problem can hardly be satisfactory solved on the basis of the documentary evidence available".

He was the brother, among others, of Theodore Kantakouzenos, the Byzantine ambassador to France and Venice.

== Sources ==
- Nicol, Donald M. (1968). The Byzantine Family of Kantakouzenos (Cantacuzenus), ca. 1100–1460: A Genealogical and Prosopographical Study. Dumbarton Oaks studies 11. Washington, DC: Dumbarton Oaks Center for Byzantine Studies.
- Nicol, Donald M. (1993) [1972]. The Last Centuries of Byzantium, 1261–1453 (Second ed.). Cambridge: Cambridge University Press. ISBN 978-0-521-43991-6.

Demetrios I Kantakouzenos Kantakouzenos dynasty Born: c. 1343 Died: 1384
Regnal titles
Preceded by Matthew Kantakouzenos	Despot of the Morea; 1383	Succeeded by Theodore I Palaiologos
