= Da Fiesole =

da Fiesole is an Italian surname. Notable people with the surname include:

- Fra Giovanni da Fiesole (c. 1395–1455), Italian painter
- Mino da Fiesole (c. 1429–1484), Italian sculptor
