= Antonio II =

Antonio II may refer to:

- Antonio II da Montefeltro (1348–1404)
- Antonio II Acciaioli, Duke of Athens from 1439 to 1445
