= Antonio II Acciaioli =

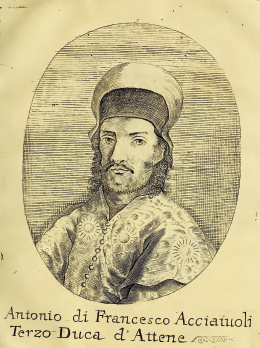
- Antonio II as depicted in a late-17th-century book

Duke of Athens
- Reign: 1439-1445
- Predecessor: Nerio II Acciaioli
- Successor: Francesco I Acciaioli
- Died: 1445
- Spouse: Maria Zorzi
- Issue: Francesco II Acciaioli
- House: Acciaioli
- Father: Francesco lord of Sykaminon
- Mother: Margareta Malpigli
- Religion: Roman Catholic

Antonio II Acciaioli was the Duke of Athens from 1439 to 1445.

He was a son of Francesco, Lord of Sykaminon, and Margareta Malpigli. Francesco was son of Donato; Donato was brother of Nerio I, Duke of Athens. Antonio II grew up in Florence until 1413, when his father's cousin Antonio I (son of Nerio I) called him and his brother Nerio II to Greece to live at his court. When the elder Antonio died in January 1435, he left the duchy to Nerio II under the regency of his widow Maria Melissene. However, Antonio forced Nerio from the city in January 1439. Antonio ruled energetically but briefly and died in 1445, to be replaced by his deposed brother.

== Family ==
He married Maria Zorzi and had a child:

- Francesco II Acciaioli, Duke of Athens.
