= Bartolomeo Contarini (nobleman) =

Venetian businessman and nobleman

Bartolomeo Contarini was a Venetian businessman who married the widowed duchess of Athens Chiara Zorzi in 1453 and governed the duchy in the name of her infant son, Francesco I.

Bartolomeo was the son of Priam, the castellan of Nauplia. After going to Athens on business, he fell in love with Chiara and sent to have his wife in Venice murdered in order to marry the duchess. The Athenian citizenry, however, mistrusted the two lovers' influence over the young duke and probably feared for his life. They called upon Mehmet II, the Ottoman sultan, to intervene on behalf of the young duke Francis. Bartolomeo and Chiara were summoned to his court at Adrianople and the young duke was taken into the sultan's care while his cousin Francesco II was sent to Athens as a Turkish client duke.

The new duke had Chiara murdered at Megara and Bartolomeo appealed to the sultan for justice. Athens was taken into Turkish hands and Francis II deposed.

== See also ==
- The House of Contarini, an important dynasty of Doges in the Republic of Venice
