= Church of Panagia Atheniotissa =

Former church on the Acropolis of Athens

Coordinates: 37.9714°N 23.7263°E

The Church of Our Lady of Athens or Panagia Atheniotissa (Greek: Παναγία η Αθηνιώτισσα, lit. 'Panagia the Athenian') was a Greek Orthodox basilica adapted from the ruins of the Parthenon sometime in the 6th century. During the Frankish occupation of Athens the church became the Catholic archiepiscopal cathedral of Our Lady by Papal Bull in 1206. It remained under the Latin liturgy until the departure of the last Florentine Duke of Athens in 1458, when it briefly returned to the Orthodox confession. Sometime after the Ottoman occupation in 1460, the Parthenon was converted into a mosque.

== History ==
The end of pagan worship at the Parthenon cannot be dated precisely. The decree of Theodosius II (438) concerning the conversion of pagan temples and the edict of Justinian (529) closing the classical schools of philosophy set the context from which it can be inferred that paganism ceased in the 5th century. The last dedication in the Parthenon by a polytheist is dated to 375, and the last Panathenaic Games were held in 391 or 395. F.W. Deichmann has shown that the conversion to a church must have occurred before 578–582, due to the presence of Christian tombs with datable numismatic evidence on the south side of the Parthenon. The building suffered a devastating fire in the late Roman period such that the original roof was destroyed; this was then repaired in such a way that only the naos was reroofed with the peripteral colonnade left open to the sky. This was the structure that was converted into a church.

The conversion took the form of altering the naos into the nave of a basilica and the opisthodomos into a narthex. This space was entered from the west, where the intercolumnar spaces of the pronaos had been walled off with a low wall forming a single doorway. Two doors were created in the opisthodomos, on the north and south walls of the naos, along with the existing one making three external entrances in total. A screened off baptistry was also made in the narthex. The wall that divided the opisthodomos from the naos was pierced to make further interior doorways. The nave led to a semicircular apse formed from the walled-off east pronaos to the temple. In addition to the architectural changes there are some 232 graffiti on the Parthenon from the Christian period, 60 of which are datable, that has provided valuable information on Christian worship of the time.

In the process of conversion, significant damage was done to the sculpture of the classical temple. This included cutting away parts of the frieze to make clerestory windows into the nave and to create the apse. Also, it is evident that there was a concerted effort to deface many of the figures. The metopes particularly suffered, though why some were vandalized and others left has been the cause of speculation. Rodenwalt argued that those spared (N32 for example) were done so because an interpretatio christiana was applied where the mythological scenes were reinterpreted. Subsequent scholarship has questioned Rodenwalt's conclusions. When and by whom the vandalism was done nevertheless remains an open problem.

== See also ==
- Conversion of non-Islamic places of worship into mosques

== Bibliography ==
- Anderson, Benjamin (2017). "The Defacement of the Parthenon Metopes". Greek, Roman, and Byzantine Studies. 57: 248–260.
- Pollini, John (2007). "Christian Desecration and Mutilation of the Parthenon". Mitteilungen des Deutschen Archäologischen Instituts Athenische Abteilung. 122: 207–228.
- Kaldellis, Anthony (2009). The Christian Parthenon: Classicism and Pilgrimage in Byzantine Athens. Cambridge.
- Alexopoulos, Stefanos (2015). "When a Column Speaks, The Liturgy of the Christian Parthenon". Dumbarton Oaks Papers. 69: 159–178. JSTOR 26497713.
- Tournikiotis, Panayotis, ed. (2009). The Parthenon and Its Impact in Modern Times. Abrams. ISBN 9780810963146.
