= Angelo Acciaioli di Cassano =

Italian diplomat

Agnolo Acciaioli or Acciaiuoli (also called di Cassano; died after 1467) was a Florentine ambassador and politician, a member of the Acciaioli family.

He had inherited his title of Baron of Cassano by his grandfather Donato, but his fiefs in the Kingdom of Naples were confiscated in 1467. His diplomatic career began in Naples, where he was created knight by Queen Joanna II in 1415. Later he moved to the family's ancestral city, Florence, where he was also created knight and for which he served as ambassador in Venice, Lucca, Ferrara and the Pope, among the others.

In 1448 and 1454 he was elected Gonfalonier of the Florentine Republic, but his career suffered a serious setback when, together with Diotisalvi Neroni, Luca Pitti and Niccolò Soderini, he conspired against Piero de' Medici. When the plan was discovered, Acciaioli was exiled to Barletta (1466) and later banned for life. His daughter Laudomia Acciaioli married Pierfrancesco the Elder.
