= Irene Palaiologina (Byzantine empress) =

Byzantine empress

Empress consort of the Byzantine Empire
- Tenure: 15 April 1353-1357
- Died: after 1356
- Spouse: Matthew Kantakouzenos
- Issue: John Kantakouzenos; Demetrios I Kantakouzenos; Theodora Kantakouzene; Helena Kantakouzene; Maria Kantakouzene; Theodore Kantakouzenos (?)
- House: Palaiologos
- Father: Demetrios Palaiologos
- Mother: Theodora Komnene

Irene Palaiologina (died after 1356) was the empress consort of Matthew Kantakouzenos.

== Family ==
Irene was a daughter of despotēs Demetrios Palaiologos and his wife, possibly Theodora Komnene. Irene's paternal grandparents were Andronikos II Palaiologos and his second wife Irene of Montferrat. The paternal uncles of Irene included Michael IX Palaiologos and Theodore I, Marquess of Montferrat. Her maternal aunt was possibly Simonida.

== Empress ==
On 26 October 1341, her father-in-law John VI was crowned emperor at Didymoteicho. His rival John V Palaiologos reigned from Constantinople. The civil war between them lasted until 1347. On 3 February 1347, the two sides reached an agreement. John VI was accepted as senior emperor with John V as his junior co-ruler.

On 15 April 1353, Matthew was declared co-emperor and the conflict between John V and John VI restarted over what was seen as an attempt of John VI to secure his succession. Irene became thus the third Empress consort along with her mother-in-law Irene Asanina (wife of John VI) and sister-in-law Helena Kantakouzene (wife of John V).

On 4 December 1354, John VI abdicated and he and Asanina retired to separate monasteries while John V secured control of Constantinople. Matthew was able to keep his title and part of Thrace as his own dominion. On February, 1356, he and Irene were captured by Serbian forces and remained in captivity until delivered to John V in December, 1357. Matthew was forced to abdicate and Irene ceased being considered an Empress. The date of her death was not recorded.

== Marriage ==
The History of John VI Kantakouzenos records the marriage of Irene to Matthew Kantakouzenos in 1340.

The couple had at least five children:

- John Kantakouzenos (c. 1342 – after 1361), despotēs.
- Demetrios I Kantakouzenos (c. 1343 – 1383), sebastokratōr. Briefly ruled the Despotate of Morea.
- Theodora Kantakouzene. Eldest daughter. The History records her being educated by her paternal grandmother Irene Asanina, under the monastic name Eugenia. Presumed to have become a nun herself.
- Helena Kantakouzene. Married Count Luis Fadrique of Salona, a descendant of Alfonso Fadrique. She served as the regent of Salona from 1382 to 1394.
- Maria Kantakouzene. Married John Laskaris Kalopheros, a man of senatorial rank from the Kingdom of Cyprus.
- (possibly) Theodore Kantakouzenos (after 1361 – 1410), ambassador to France and Venice.

== Sources ==
- Nicol, Donald M. (1968). The Byzantine Family of Kantakouzenos (Cantacuzenus), ca. 1100–1460: A Genealogical and Prosopographical Study. Dumbarton Oaks studies 11. Washington, DC: Dumbarton Oaks Center for Byzantine Studies. OCLC 390843.

Irene Palaiologina (Byzantine empress) Palaiologos Born: ? Died: ?
Royal titles
Preceded by Irene Asanina and Helena Kantakouzene	Byzantine Empress consort 1353–1357 with Irene Asanina (1353–1354); Helena Kantakouzene (1353–1357)	Succeeded by Helena Kantakouzene
