= Brontochion Monastery =

Byzantine-era former monastery in Mystras, Greece

- Βροντόχιον, Μονή Βροντοχίου
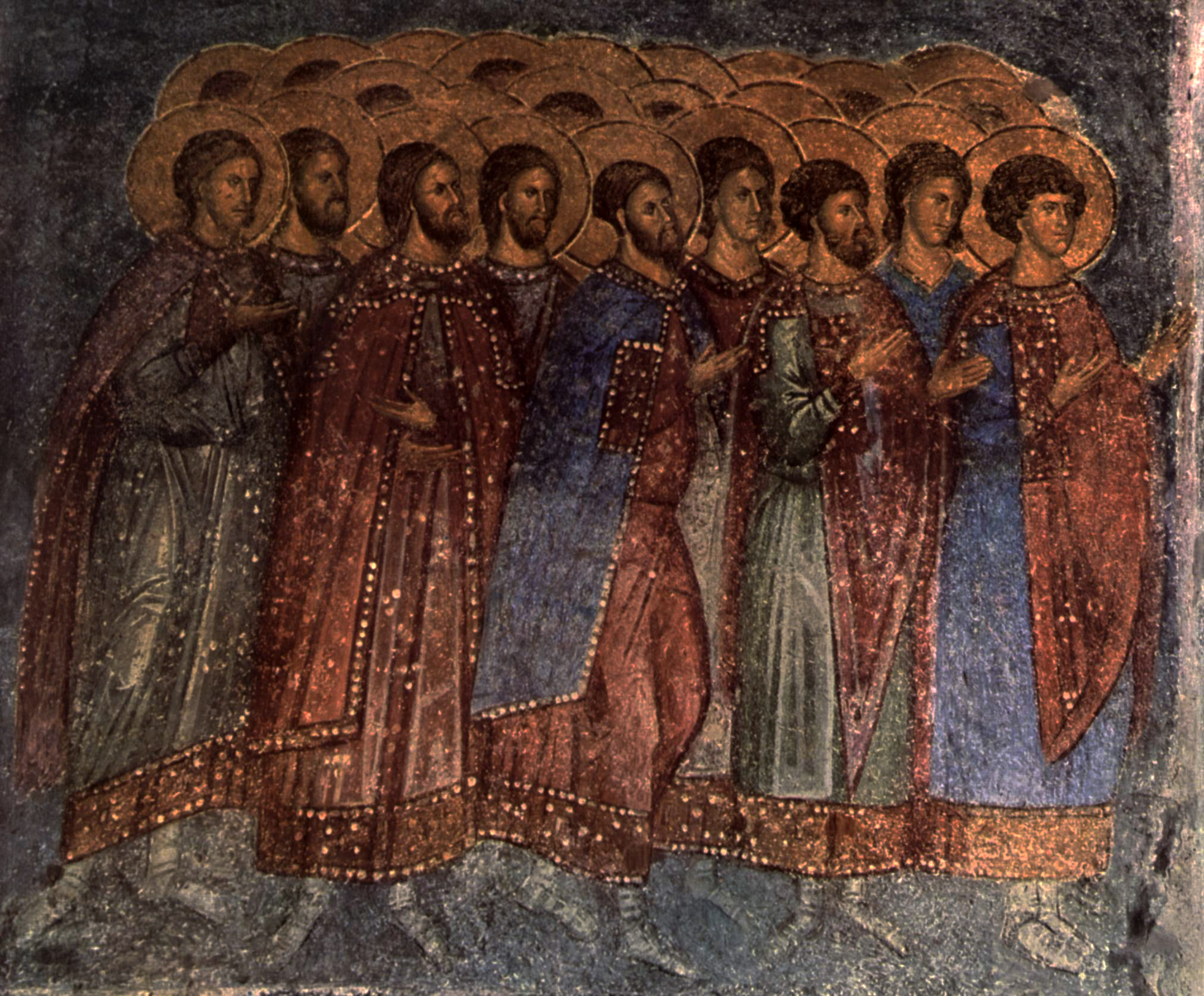
- The frescoes of Aphentiko church, part of the former monastery complex

- Location of the former monastery in Greece
- Interactive map of Brontochion Monastery

Monastery information
- Full name: Holy Monastery of Brontochion
- Other names: Holy Churches of Saint Theodores and Panagia Hodegetria
- Order: Ecumenical Patriarchate of Constantinople (former)
- Denomination: Eastern Orthodox Church (former)

People
- Important associated figures: Theodore I Palaiologos (burial)

Architecture
- Status: Monastery (former)
- Functional status: Inactive (as a monastery); Historic site
- Style: Byzantine
- Completed date: c. 1310

Site
- Location: Mystras, Peloponnese
- Country: Greece
- Coordinates: 37°04′34″N 22°22′01″E
- Website

UNESCO World Heritage Site
- Part of: Archaeological Site of Mystras
- Criteria: Cultural: ii, iii, iv
- Reference: 511
- Inscription: 1989 (13th Session)
- Area: 54.43 ha (134.5 acres)
- Buffer zone: 1,202.52 ha (2,971.5 acres)

Brontochion Monastery (Greek: Βροντόχιον, Μονή Βροντοχίου) is a former Eastern Orthodox monastery, located in Mystras, in the Peloponnese region of Greece.

The former monastery is part of the UNESCO World Heritage Site of Mystras, inscribed in 1989.

== Overview ==
The abbot Pachomius incorporated into the monastery the small church of the Hodegetria, or "Aphentikon", as the monastery's katholikon. The church was reconstructed and completed around 1310, with some scholars giving 1308-1312 as the construction dates and others 1310–1322. The despot Theodore I Palaiologos, who died in 1407, is buried in the church.

The Hodegetria Church is the first example of what's called the "Mystras type" design. The lower floor is a three-aisled basilica, whereas above is a traditional Byzantine cross-in-square church plan. The cross-in-square, five-domed gallery is encircled by a portico that has a belfry. There are also features more typical of Constantinople, such as the use of blind arches.

On the lower level the walls are covered by marble revetment, a luxurious feature, and there is also a surviving fresco of the Virgin Mary as Zoodochos Pege (Life-containing Source) in the lunette above the so-called royal door.

During Ottoman rule, the monastery was converted into a mosque.

== See also ==
- Ancient Roman and Byzantine domes
- Hodegetria
- List of monasteries in Greece
