= Diotisalvi Neroni =

Italian politician

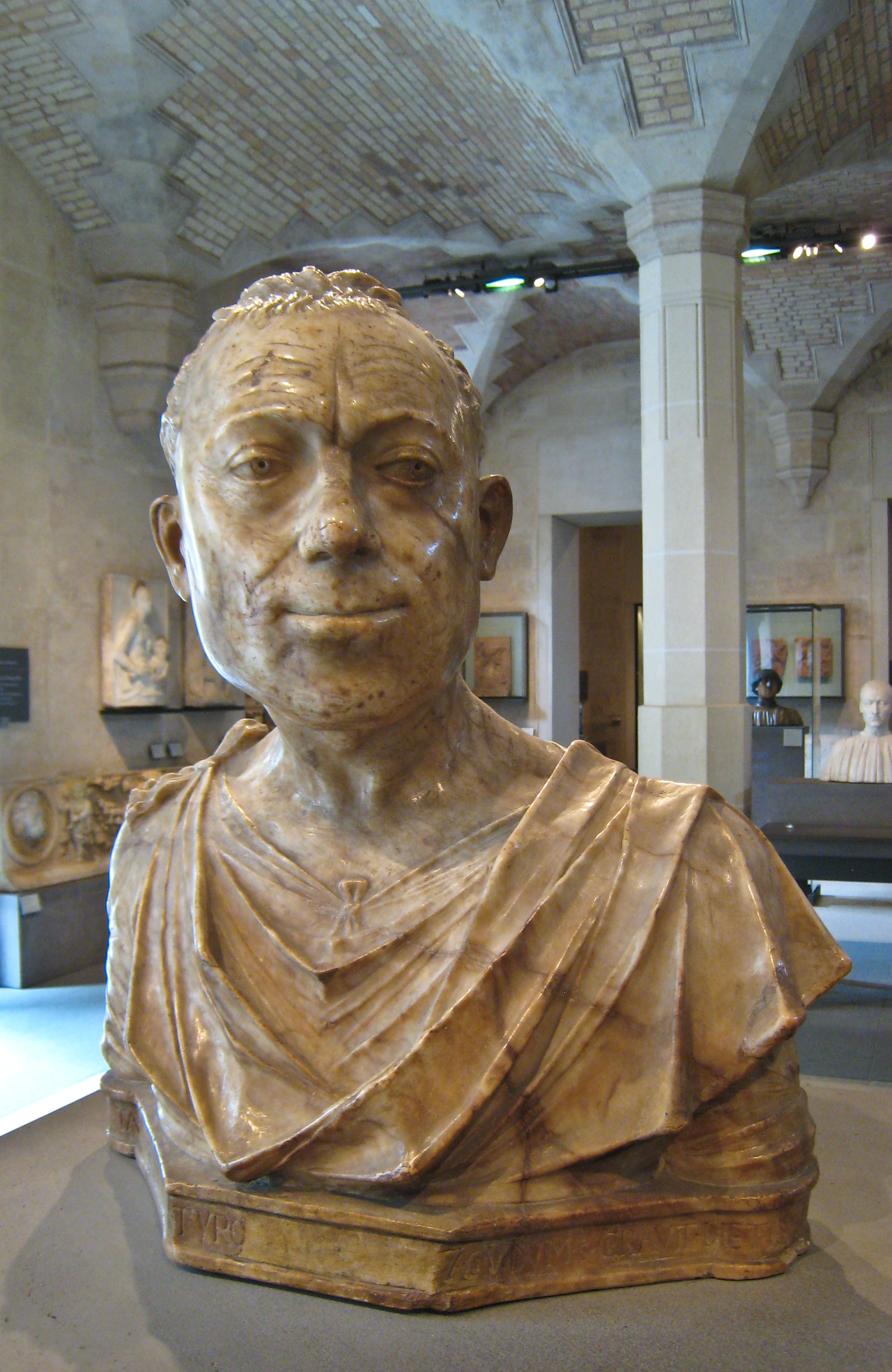
Bust of Neroni by Mino da Fiesole

Diotisalvi Neroni (1401 – 4 August 1482) was an Italian politician. He wrote Florentina Syndicatus.

Born in Florence, he was appointed to numerous important positions in that city. He was ambassador in Milan and a protagonist of the Peace of Lodi in 1454.

The chief advisor of Cosimo de' Medici the Elder, he helped him to return to Florence from his exile. Cosimo recommended that Florence be governed under Neroni's direction after his death, but the ineptitude and the tyrannical behavior shown by Cosimo's son, Piero the Gouty, pushed Neroni to take part in the 1466 conspiracy against him led by Luca Pitti, Angelo Acciaiuoli and Niccolò Soderini. Piero, however, was warned of the plot and crushed all its participants. Neroni and his sons were declared rebels; all their assets were confiscated.

Neroni moved to Sicily and, later, to Ferrara, where he was hosted by Borso d'Este, another member of the 1466 conspiracy.

He died in Rome and was buried in the basilica of Santa Maria sopra Minerva. Of him, a bust by Mino da Fiesole in the Louvre and a portrait by Domenico Ghirlandaio in the Sistine Chapel remain.
