= Theodore I Palaiologos =

- Despotes
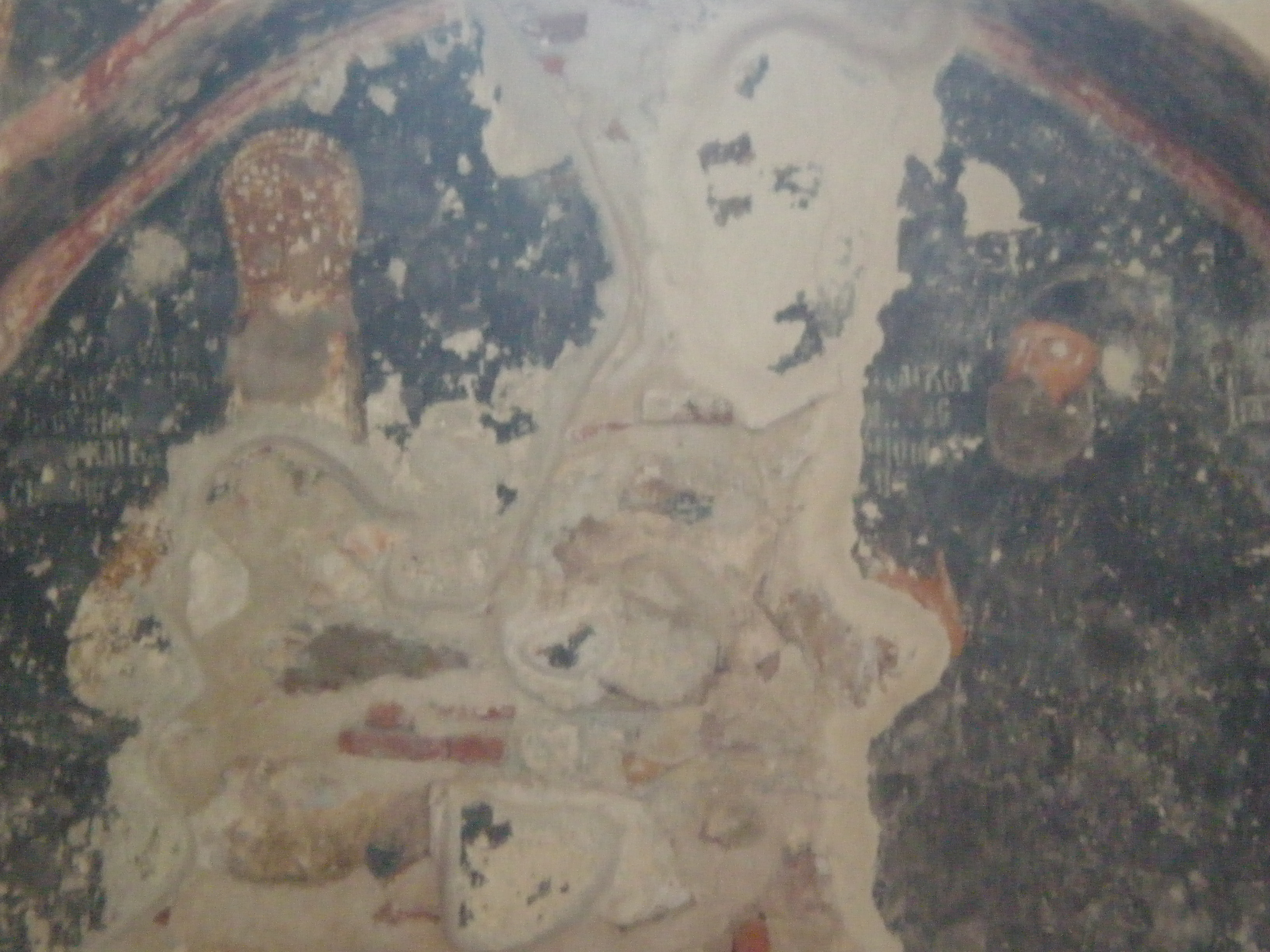
- Fresco from the Church of the Virgin Hodegetria in Mystras representing the despot Theodore I as ruler and monk.

Despot of the Morea
- Reign: 1383–1407
- Predecessor: Demetrios I Kantakouzenos
- Successor: Theodore II Palaiologos
- Born: c. 1355
- Died: 24 June 1407 (aged c. 52)
- Spouse: Bartolomea Acciaioli
- Issue: Theodora (Illegitimate)
- Dynasty: Palaiologos
- Father: John V Palaiologos
- Mother: Helena Kantakouzene
- Religion: Greek Orthodox

Theodore I Palaiologos (or Palaeologus) (Greek: Θεόδωρος Α΄ Παλαιολόγος, romanized: Theodōros I Palaiologos) (c. 1355 – 24 June 1407) was despot (despotēs) in the Morea from 1383 until his death on 24 June 1407. A son of Emperor John V Palaiologos, Theodore was the first member of the Palaiologos dynasty appointed as the Despot of the Morea, following the final defeat of the rival Kantakouzenos clan, who under John VI Kantakouzenos had attempted to usurp rule of the Byzantine Empire.

Theodore conducted several military campaigns to expand his province, successfully annexing several Latin possessions that remained there since the aftermath of the Fourth Crusade. He died without known heirs and was succeeded as Despot of the Morea by Theodore II, a son of Emperor Manuel II Palaiologos.

== Biography ==
Theodore was the youngest surviving son of the Byzantine Emperor John V Palaiologos and his wife Helena Kantakouzene. His maternal grandfather was former Emperor John VI Kantakouzenos. His older brothers were Emperor Andronikos IV Palaiologos and Manuel II Palaiologos.

In 1376 Theodore I Palaiologos, already named despotēs, was charged with governing Thessalonica by his father John V, but before he could take possession of the city, he was arrested and imprisoned together with his father and his brother Manuel by his eldest brother Andronikos IV. This captivity in the Prison of Anemas in Constantinople lasted throughout Andronikos' usurpation, from 1376 until 1379. Soon after the restoration of John V, Manuel was appointed to rule in Thessalonica, and Theodore was eventually transferred to Morea.

=== Morea ===
Manuel Kantakouzenos, the despot of Morea, died in 1380. His brother, Matthew Kantakouzenos, served as the interim ruler before the arrival of Theodore in late 1382 or early 1383. Either Demetrios I Kantakouzenos or John Kantakouzenos, Matthew's sons, led a rebellion during this period. However, his rebellion ended after his death.

The Morea was divided by multiple European groups by the time of Theodore's ascession as despot. The Principality of Achaea was divided into multiple fragments, Nerio I Acciaioli held Corinth, and the Republic of Venice held Coron and Modon. The Knights Hospitaller were invited by Joanna I of Naples, princess of Achaia, in 1376, while her opponent James of Baux invited Navarrese mercenaries in 1378. The Navarrese, under the leadership of Pedro de San Superano, seized control over Achaia following the death of James and launched attacks into Byzantine territories.

Theodore fought against landlords for the first five years of his rule and survived an assassination plot. Theodore called upon the Ottomans to aid him fight the Navarrese and local aristocracy and an Ottoman army under the leadership of Evrenos came in September 1387. Theodore and Evrenos won the campaign, but the Ottomans seized some land and refused to return the land. However, Murad I returned the land after a meeting with Theodore.

Theodore captured Argos, shortly after Maria of Enghien sold it to Venice. Theodore bought Corinth between September 1395 and January 1396, but sold it to the Knights Hospitaller in 1397 as he was unable to rebuild its fortifications and properly defend it. He sold the entire despotate to the Knights Hospitaller following a wave of Ottoman attacks in 1399 and 1400, but regained it in 1404.

Evrenos lead an Ottoman raid with the Navarrese into Byzantine Morea in 1395, and seized Akova Castle. More Ottoman raids occurred following the Battle of Nicopolis. Argos fell to an Ottoman army under the leadership of Yakub Pasa in June 1397, and at least 14,000 people were enslaved.

Theodore died in 1407, and was succeeded as despot by Theodore II Palaiologos.

== Personal life ==
Theodore I had married Bartolomea Acciaioli, a daughter of Duke Nerio I Acciaioli of Athens but is not known to have children. Shortly before his death, Theodore took monastic orders under the name "Theodoret", and died on 24 June 1407. He was subsequently buried at the Brontochion Monastery.

However, Theodore I had an illegitimate daughter, Theodora (whose mother is unknown), who in 1404 married Süleyman Çelebi, the Edirne Sultan during the Ottoman Interregnum. In exchange, Süleyman offered his half-siblings Yusuf Çelebi, Kasim Çelebi and Fatma Hatun as hostages to Manuel II.

== Works cited ==
- Necipoğlu, Nevra (2009). Byzantium between the Ottomans and the Latins. Cambridge University Press. doi:10.1017/CBO9780511576720. ISBN 9780511576720.

== Sources ==
- Nicol, Donald M. (1993) [1972]. The Last Centuries of Byzantium, 1261-1453. Cambridge: Cambridge University Press. ISBN 9780521439916.
- Rosser, John H. (2011). Historical Dictionary of Byzantium (2 ed.). Scarecrow Press. ISBN 978-0810874770.
- Kazhdan, Alexander, ed. (1991). The Oxford Dictionary of Byzantium. Oxford and New York: Oxford University Press. ISBN 0-19-504652-8.
- Joseph Freiherr von Hammer-Purgstall, Geschichte des Osmanischen Reiches
- Edward Gibbon, The History of the Decline and Fall of the Roman Empire
- George Sphrantzes, The Fall of the Byzantine Empire

Theodore I Palaiologos Palaiologos dynasty Born: c. 1355 Died: 1407
Regnal titles
Preceded by Demetrios I Kantakouzenos	Despot of the Morea; 1383–1407	Succeeded by Theodore II Palaiologos
