= Mino da Fiesole =

Italian sculptor (c. 1429–1484)

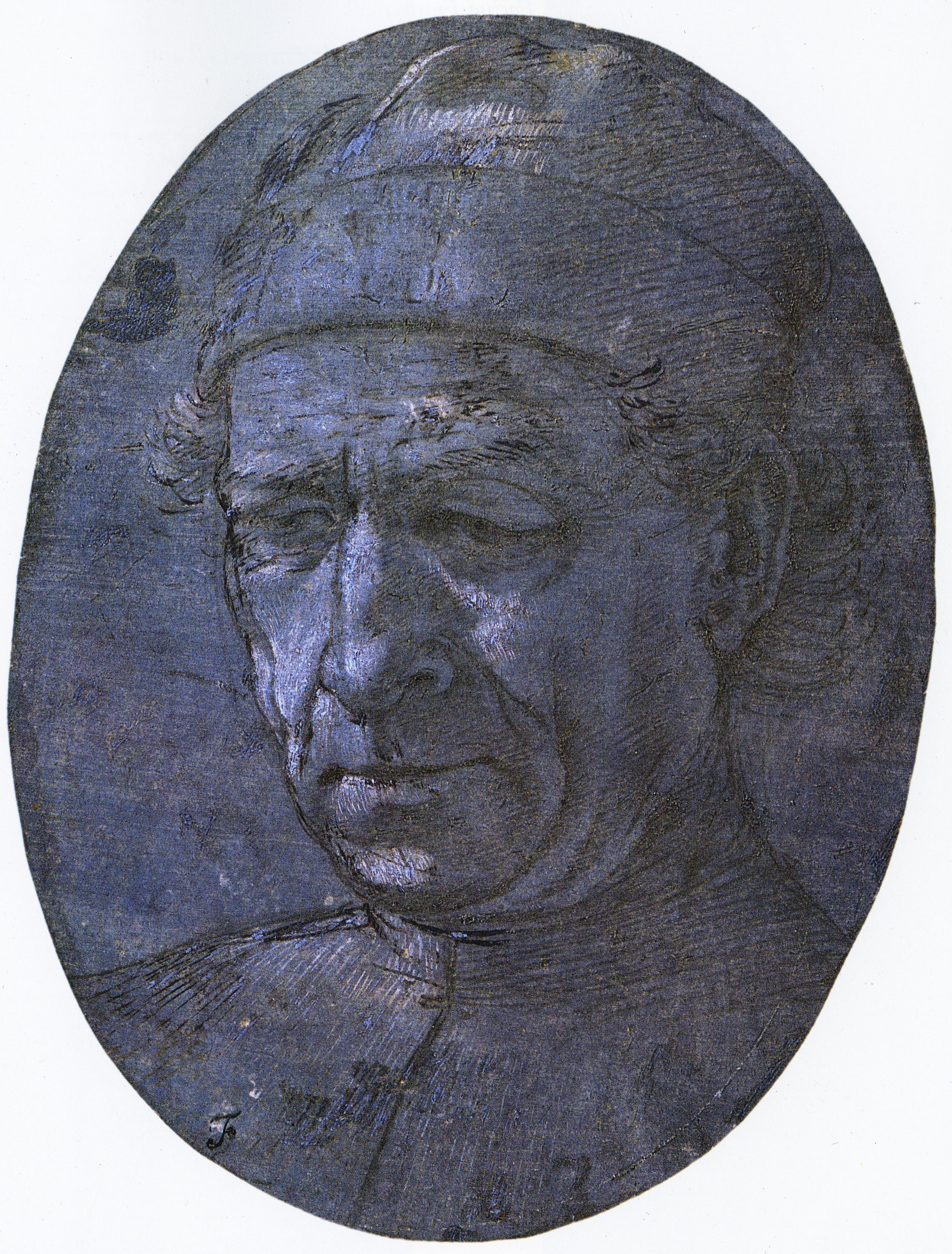
Portrait of Mino da Fiesole, metalpoint with white gouache on blue-grey prepared paper cut to an oval, Chatsworth House. Subject identified based on the similarity to the woodcut illustration in the Lives of Vasari, for which it is a probable source. Alfred Scharf's attribution of the drawing to Filippino Lippi has been generally accepted.

Mino da Fiesole (c. 1429 – July 11, 1484), also known as Mino di Giovanni, was an Italian Renaissance sculptor from Poppi, Tuscany. He is noted for his portrait busts.

== Career ==
Mino's work was influenced by his master Desiderio da Settignano and by Antonio Rossellino, and is characterized by its sharp, angular treatment of drapery. Unlike most Florentine sculptors of his generation, Mino passed two lengthy sojourns in Rome, from about 1459 to 1464 and again from about 1473/1474 until 1480.

Mino was a friend and fellow-worker of Desiderio da Settignano and Matteo Civitali, all three being about the same age. Mino's sculpture is remarkable for its finish and delicacy of details, as well as for its spirituality and strong devotional feeling.

Of Mino's earlier works, the finest are in the cathedral of Fiesole, the altarpiece and tomb of Bishop Leonardo Salutati (died 1466)

His most arduous and complicated commissions, which define his intellectual and artistic nature, are an altarpiece and tombs for the church of the Benedictine monastery in Florence known as the Badia. (The monuments have been reinstalled in the rebuilt church.) The first, completed about 1468, was essentially a private commission for the Florentine jurist Bernardo Giugni. The second, directly commissioned by the monks and finished in 1481, honored the memory of their founder, the tenth century Ugo, count of Tuscany. The wall monuments exercised Mino's skills: portraits and bas-reliefs are worked into complex tectonic aedicular structures with elaborate highly individualistic decorative moldings. Art historians have revelled in the extraordinary diversity of contemporary and ancient sources that Mino marshaled in these tombs, which distinguish him from other sculptors active in mid quattrocento Florence (Zuraw 1998).

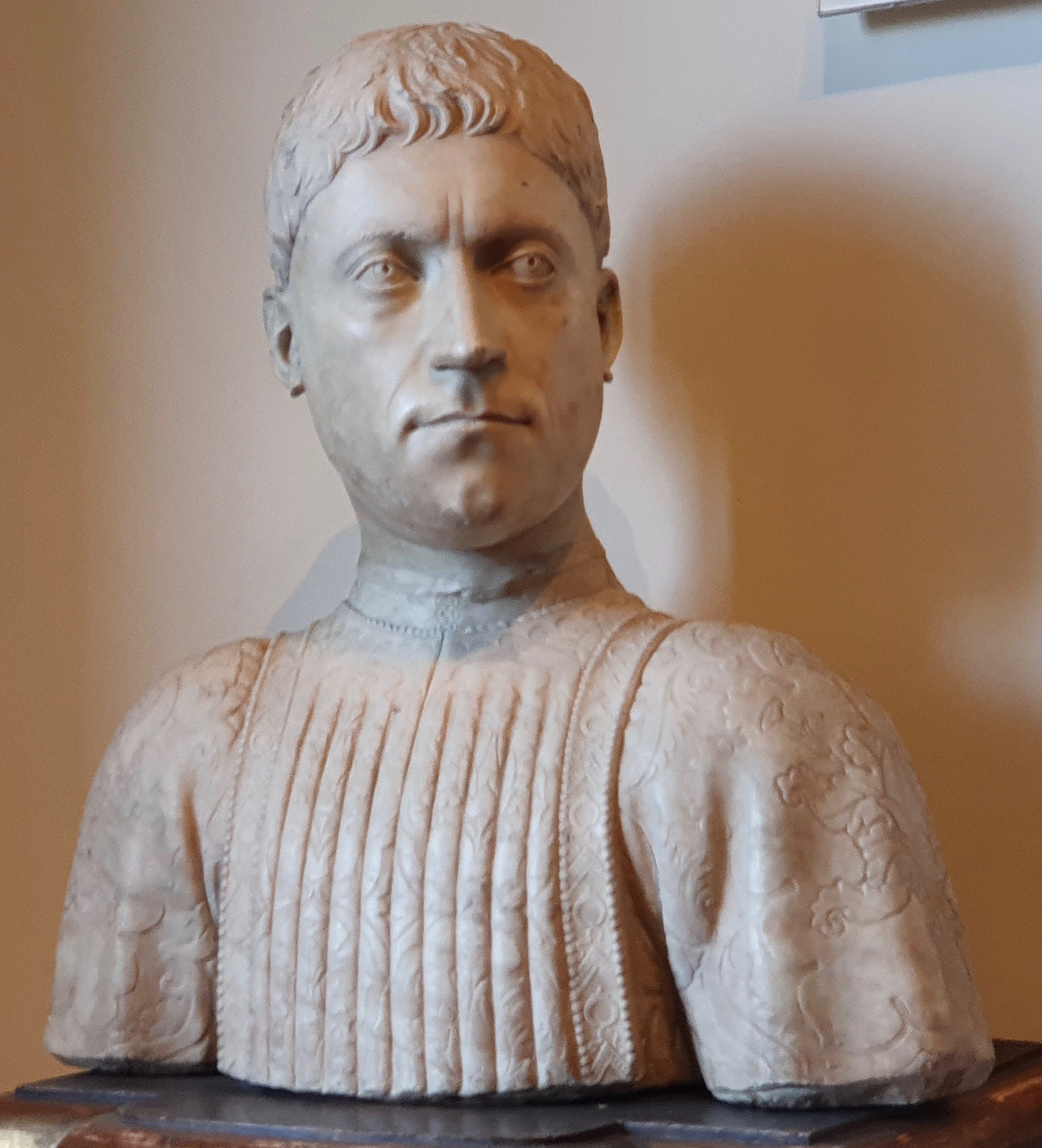
The earliest dated Renaissance portrait bust, 1453, by Mino da Fiesole of Piero de' Medici

The pulpit in Prato Cathedral, in which he collaborated with Antonio Rossellino, finished in 1473, is very delicately sculpted with bas-reliefs of great minuteness, but somewhat weakly designed.

In 1473 he went to Rome where he remained apparently about six years. It is doubtful if all the monuments there attributed to him are of his own hands; there is no question about the tomb of the Florentine Francesco Tornabuoni in the Church of Santa Maria sopra Minerva, the remains of the monument to Pope Paul II in the crypt of St. Peter's, and the beautiful little marble tabernacle for the holy oils in St. Maria in Trastevere bears the inscription Opus Mini.

Several monuments in Santa Maria del Popolo have at times been attributed to Mino, for example the marble reredos given by Pope Alexander VI. The monuments there of Archbishop of Salerno Pietro Guglielmo Rocca (d. 1482) and Bishop of Burgos Ortega Gomiel (d. 1514), however, have also been attributed to the school of Andrea Bregno.

Some of Mino's portrait busts and profile bas-reliefs are preserved in the Bargello at Florence; they are full of life and expression, though without the extreme realism of Verrocchio and other sculptors of his time.

Several museums house Mino's work, some of which include Musée du Louvre in Paris, France, Museum of Fine Arts in Boston, Massachusetts, Birmingham Museum of Art in Birmingham, Alabama, and National Gallery of Art in Washington, D.C.

His other works include:

- a portrait bust of Piero de Medici (1453), notable as "the oldest authenticated example we have of a post-classical portrait of a living person in the form of a marble bust".
- a portrait bust of Niccolò Strozzi (1454)
- a bust of Astorgio Manfredi (1455)
- the ciborium over the high altar of Santa Maria Maggiore, in Rome
- a bust of Diotisalvi Neroni, adviser to Piero de Medici (1464)
- companion pieces of Charity and Faith, most probably designed for a wall tomb (1475/1480)

Giorgio Vasari's vita of Mino da Fiesole in his Lives of the Artists dismisses him as a mere follower of Desiderio da Settignano, his master.

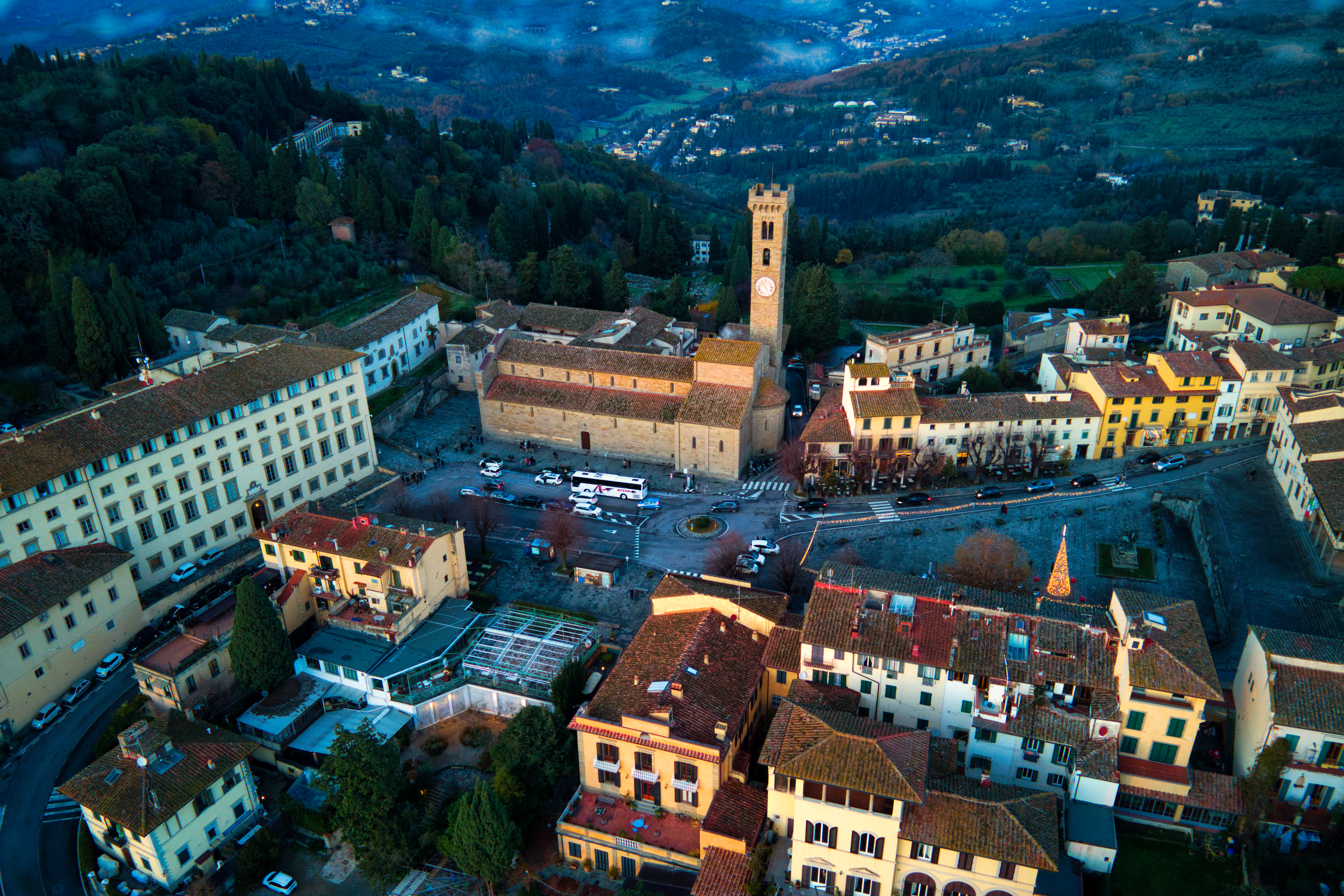
Piazza Mino da Fiesole in Fiesole

== Gallery ==
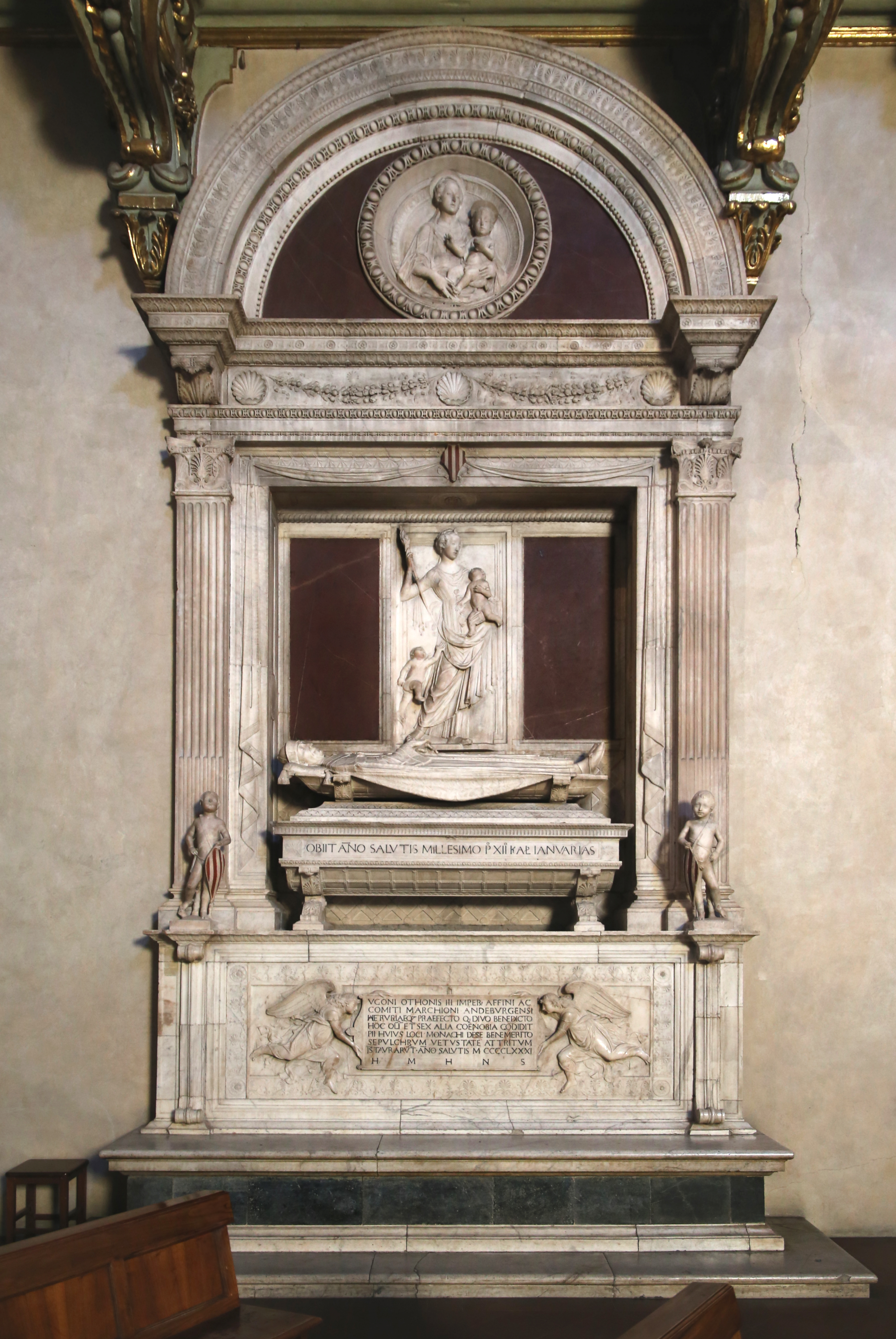
Tomb of Ugo, count of Tuscany, Badia, Florence

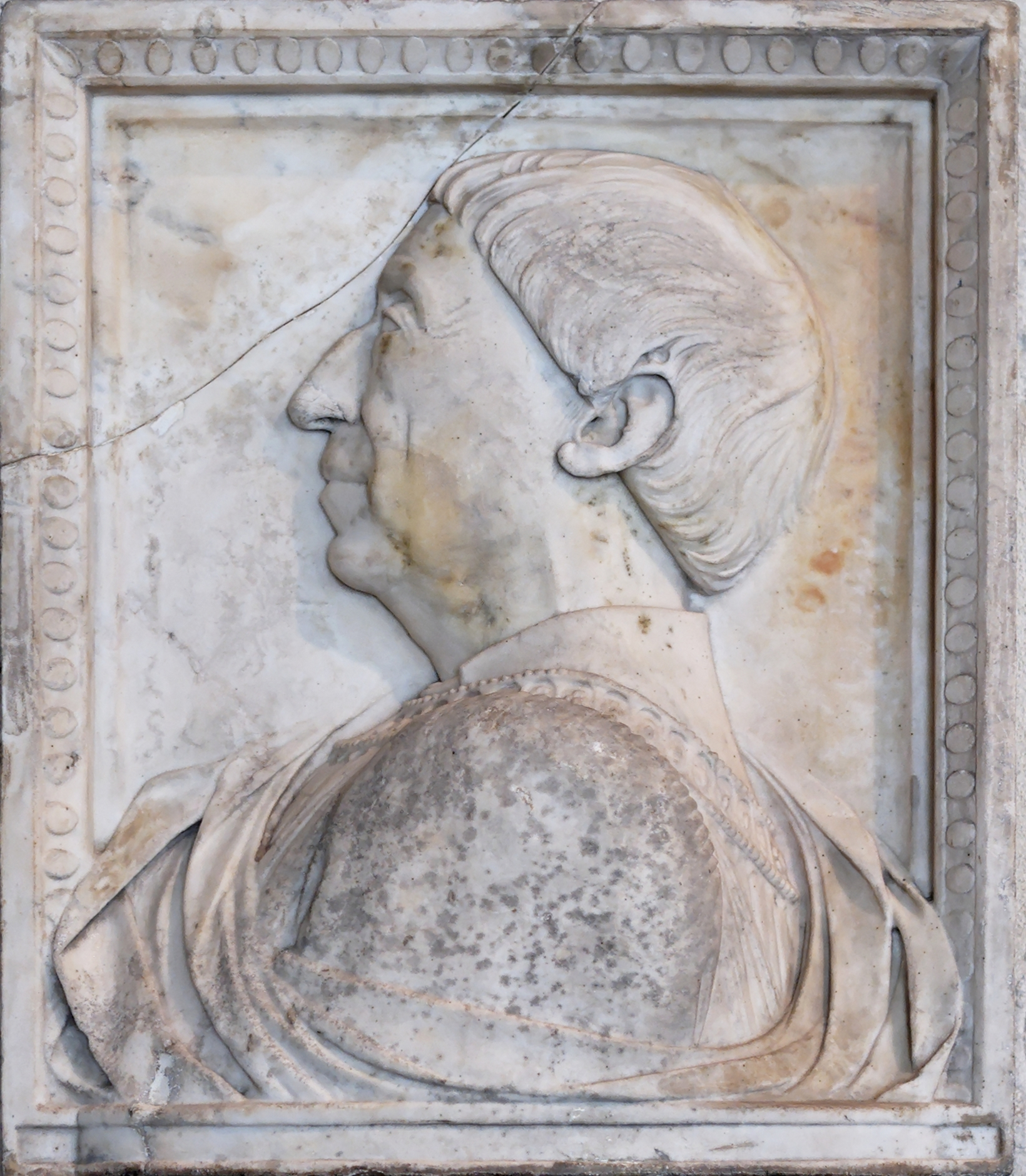
Alfonso V of Aragon

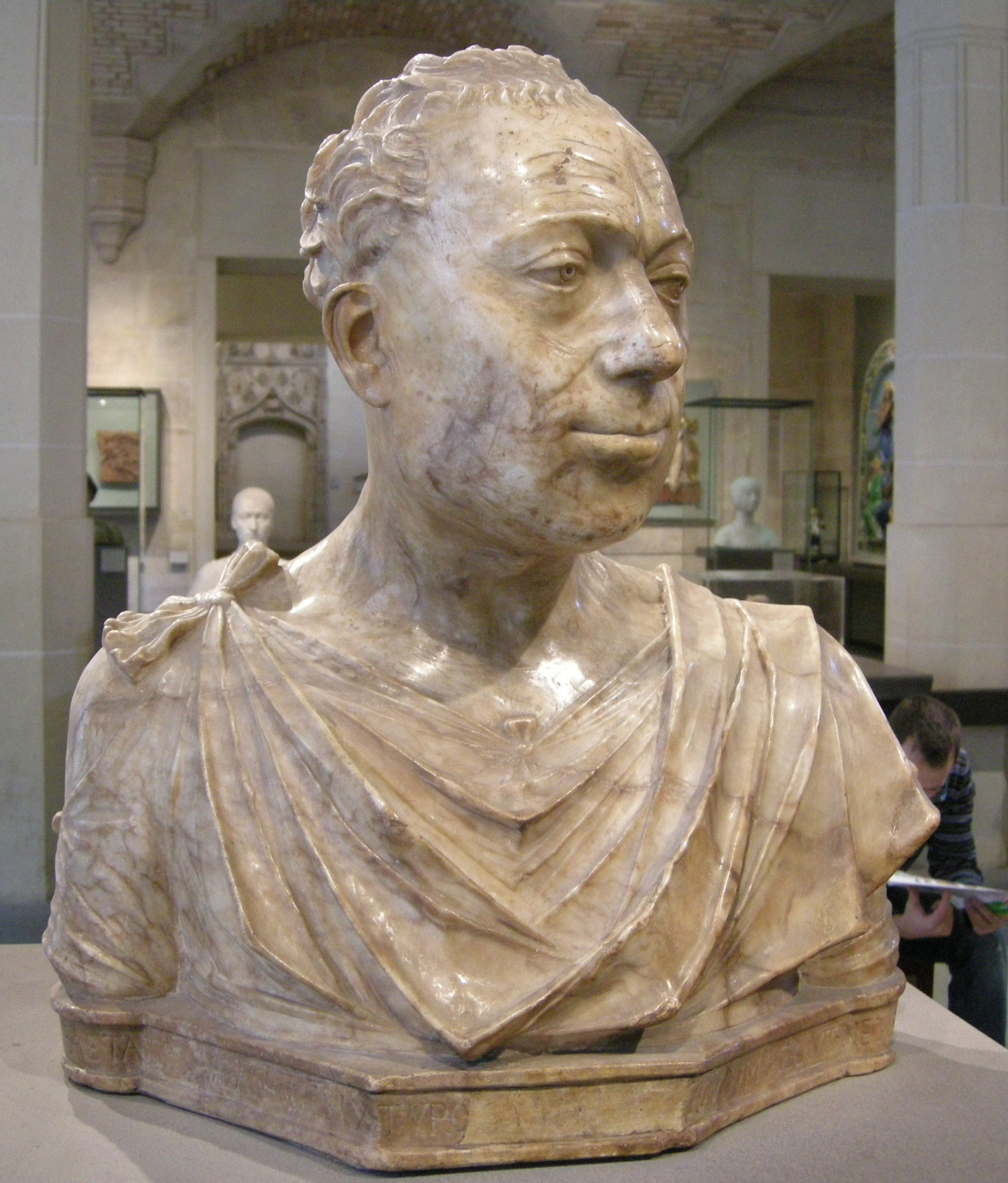
Diotisalvi Neroni

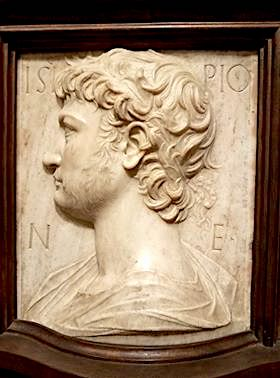
Scipio Africanus c. 1460-1465 (Philadelphia Museum of Art)

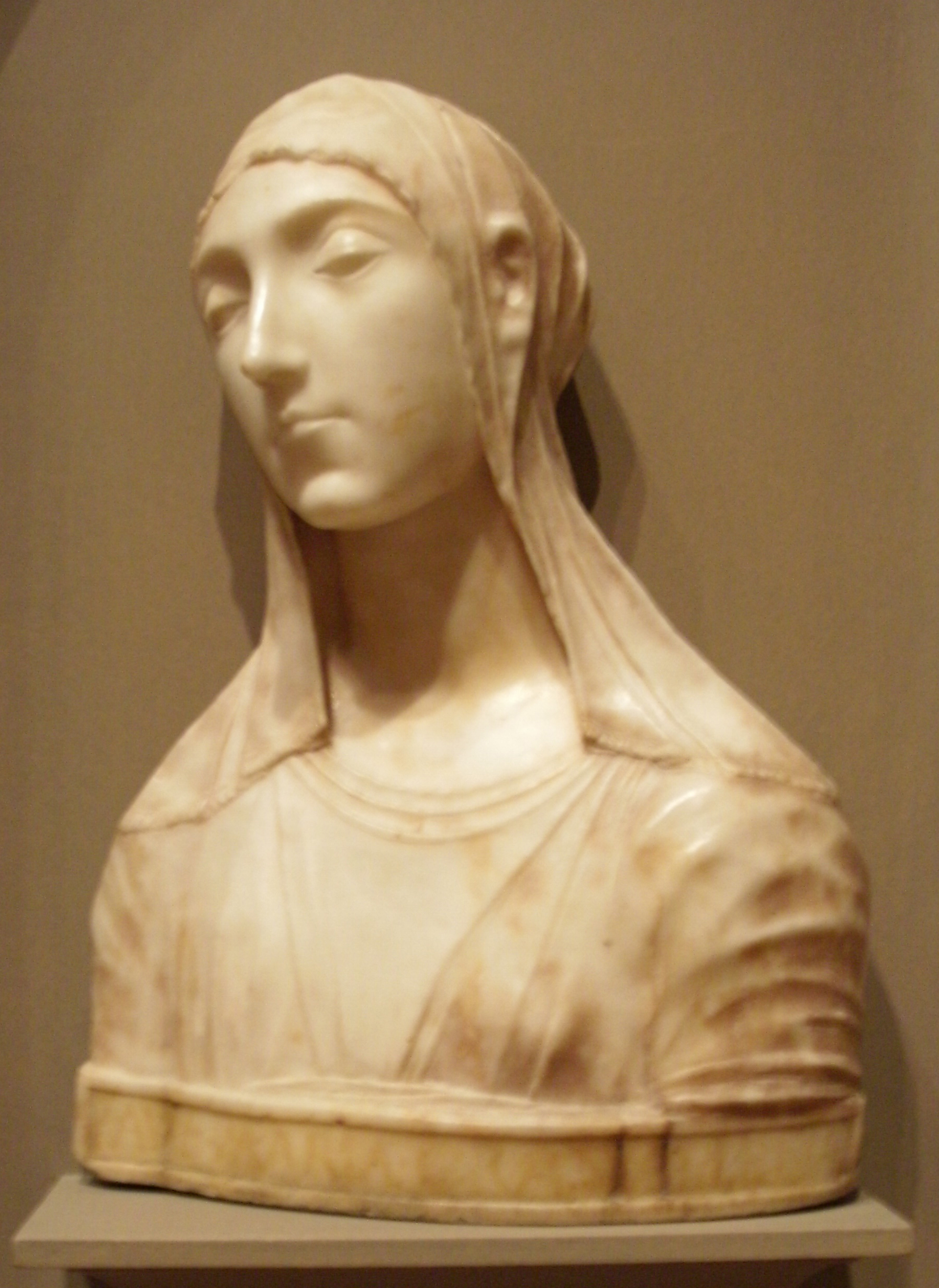
Virgin Annunciate c. 1455-1460 (National Gallery of Art, Washington, D.C.)

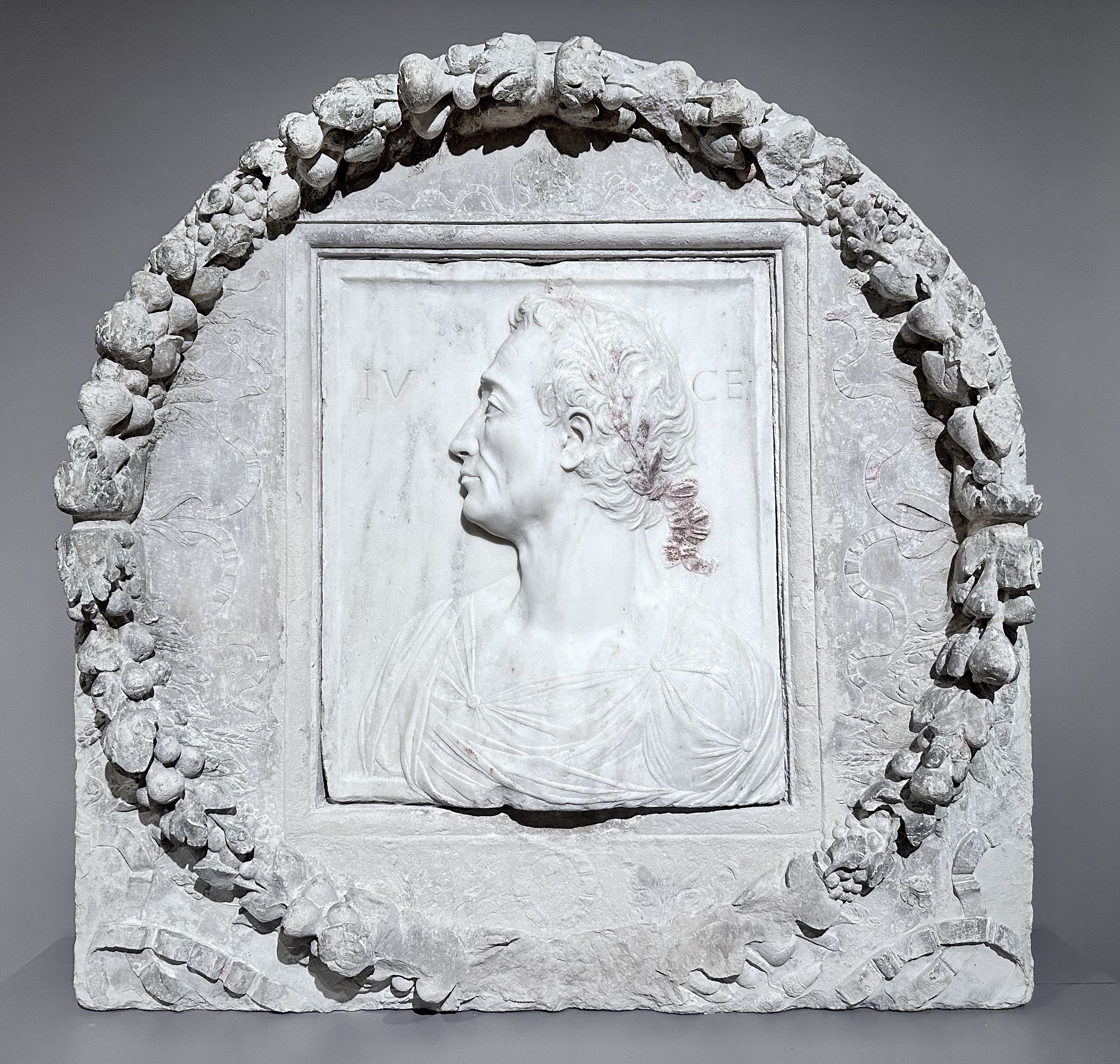
Julius Caesar c. 1455-1460 (Cleveland Museum of Art)

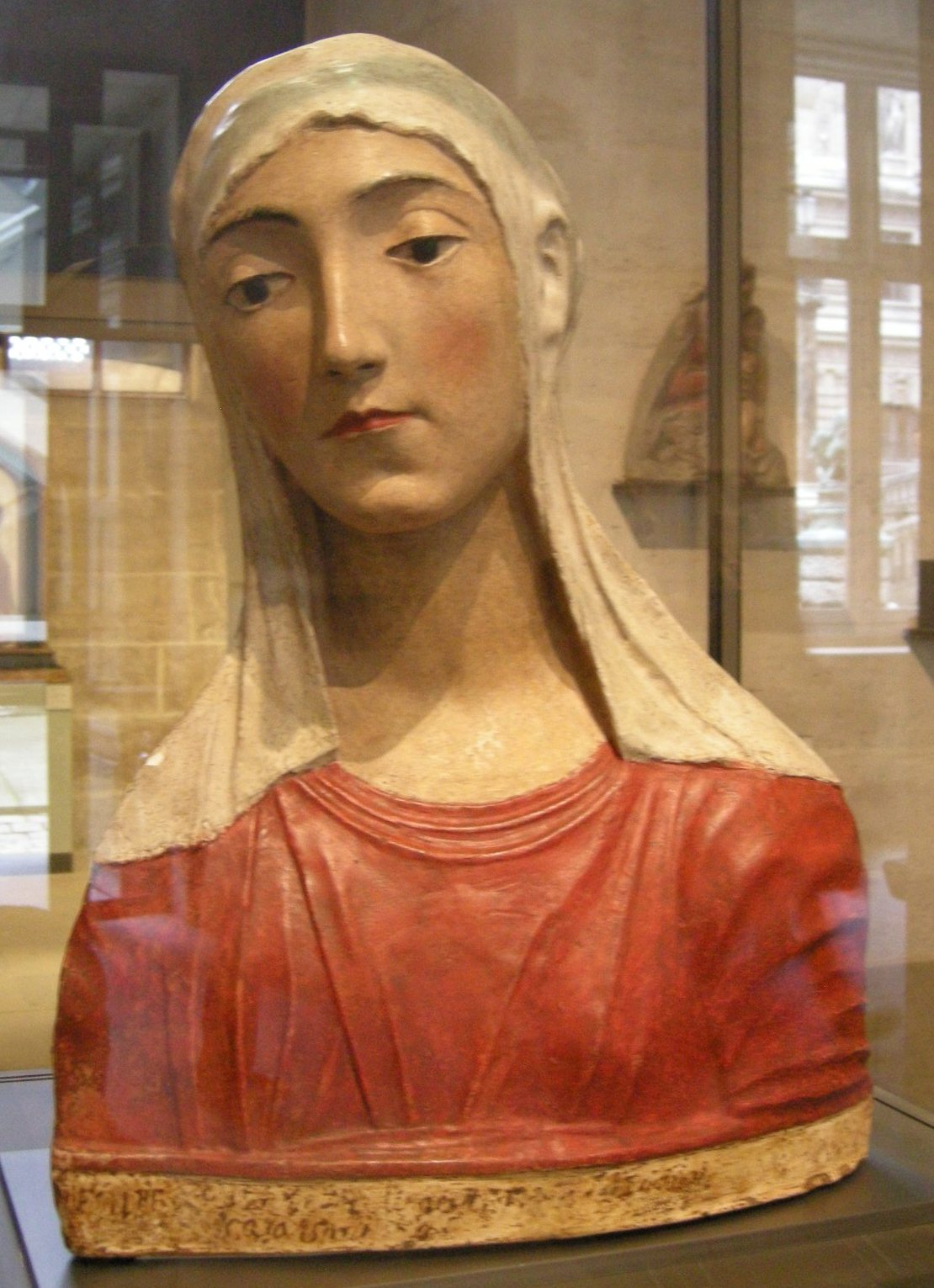
Virgin Annunciate (Louvre)

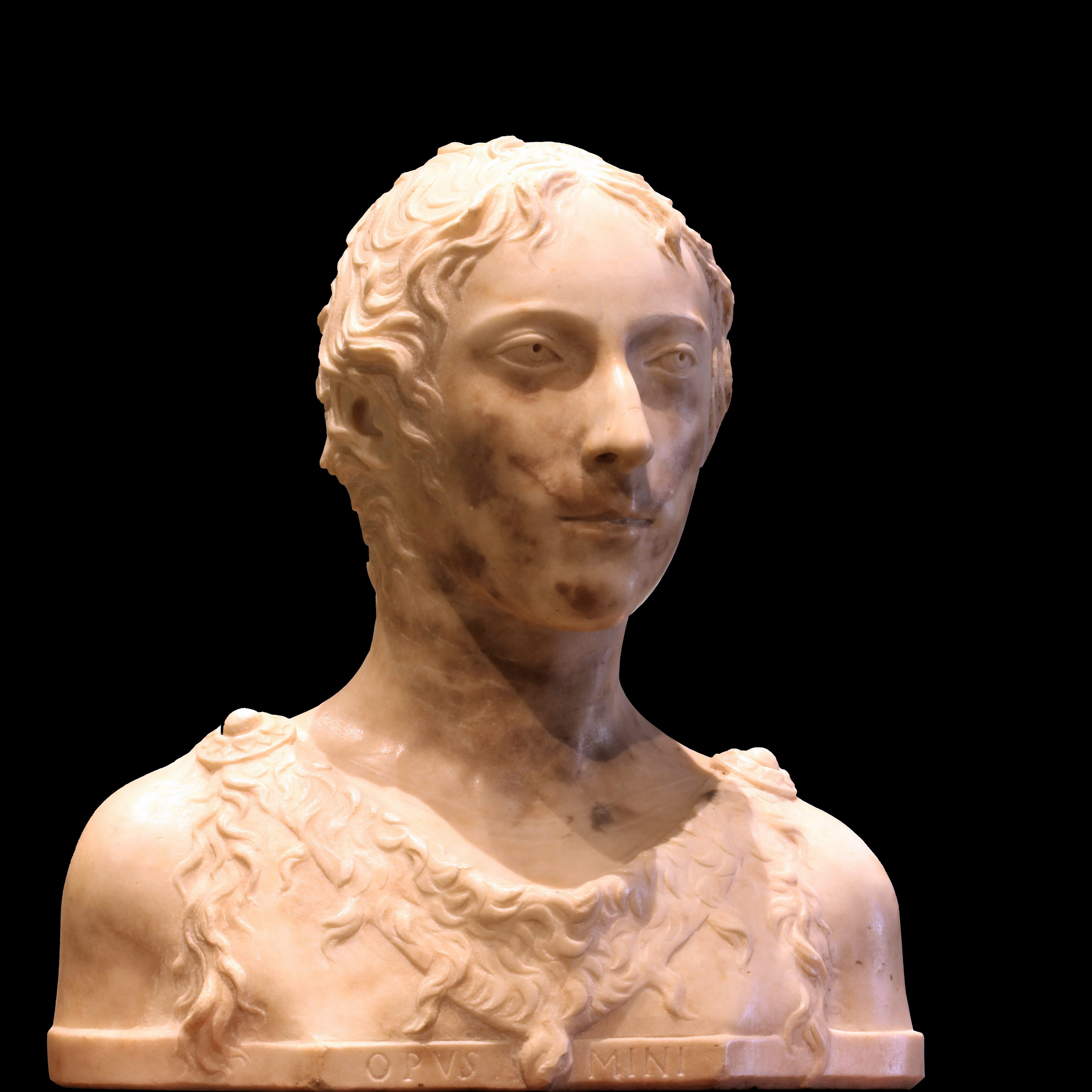
Saint John the Baptist (Museum of Fine Arts of Lyon)

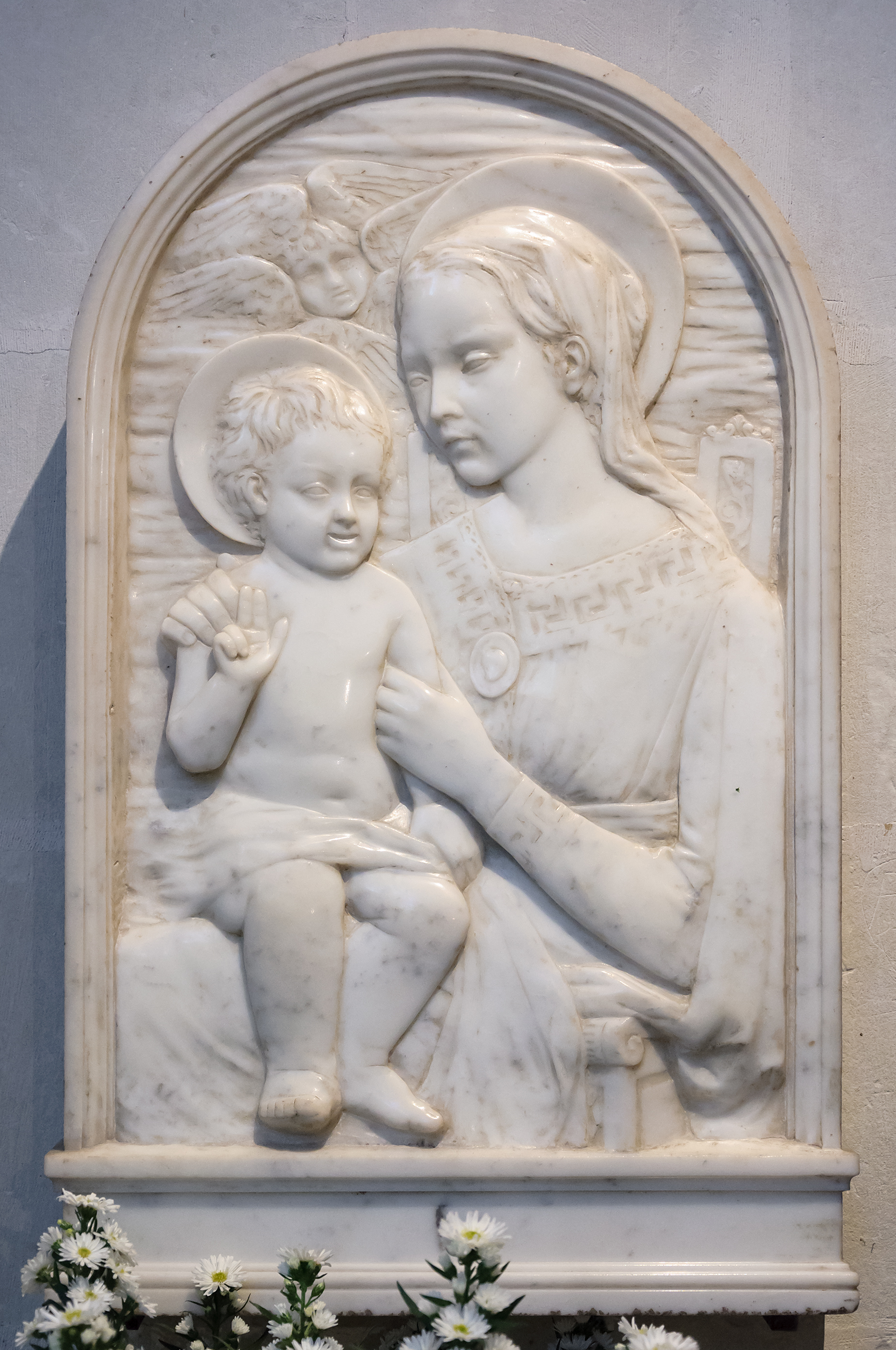
Madonna and Child Château de Chenonceau, France.

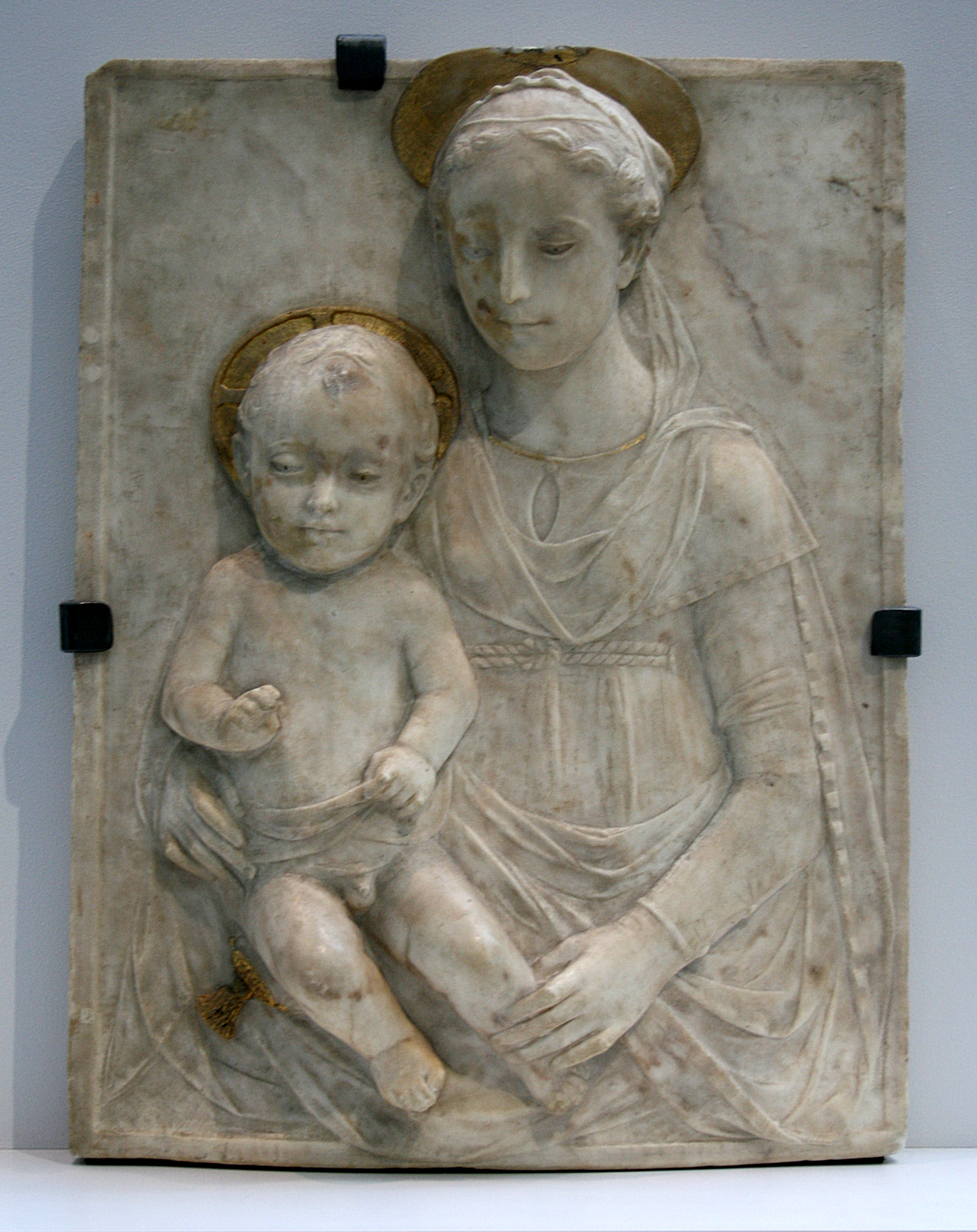
Madonna and Child Louvre, France.

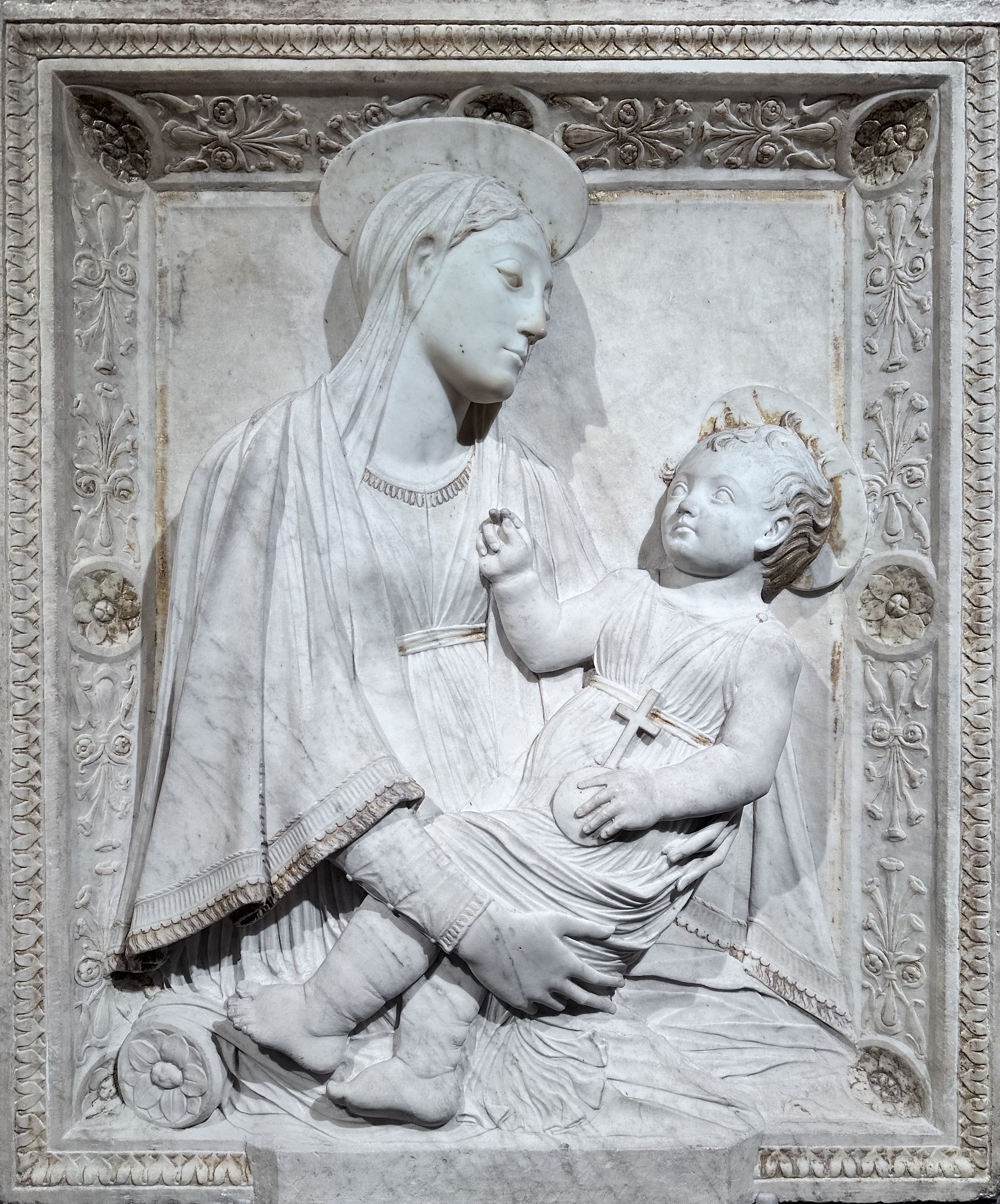
Madonna and Child c. 1461 (Cleveland Museum of Art)

== See also ==
- Master of the Marble Madonnas
