= Francesca Acciaioli =

Francesca Acciaioli or Acciajuoli (died 1430) was the wife of Carlo I Tocco, Count Palatine of Cephalonia and Zakynthos.

== Early life ==
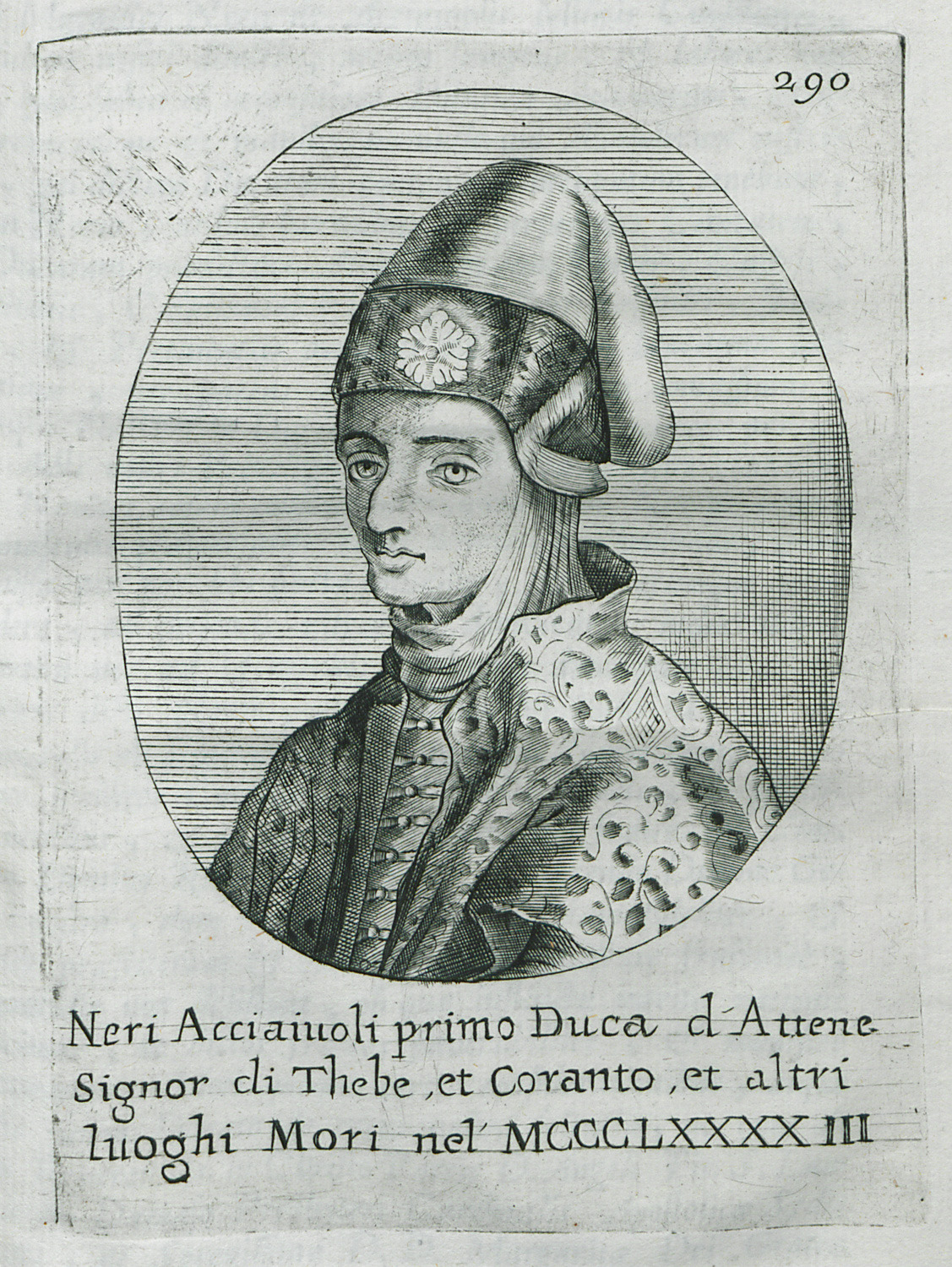
Francesca's father, Nerio I Acciaioli

Francesca was the younger of the two daughters of Nerio I Acciaioli and Agnes de' Saraceni. Nerio Acciaioli—a scion of a prominent banking house of Florence—moved to Frankish Greece in the 1360s. Initially, he acted on behalf of his powerful kinsman, Niccolò Acciaioli, who adopted him as his son. Nerio seized large domains in the Principality of Achaea: Niccolò's son, Angelo, mortgaged Corinth to him and Nerio captured Megara by force. Francesca's maternal grandfather, Saraceno de' Saraceni, was a Venetian citizen in Negroponte. Nerio and Agnes get married before 1381.

Negotiations about Francesca's marriage with a son of Felipe Dalmau, the vicar-general of the Duchy of Athens, were futile in 1382. Plans about Francesca's marriage with Angelo Acciaioli's son did not materialize either in 1388. By 1388, Nerio became the actual ruler of the Duchy of Athens.

== Countess ==
Francesca was given in marriage to Carlo I Tocco, Count Palatine of Cephalonia and Zakynthos between 1388 and 1393. Carlo I's mother, Maddalena de' Buondelmonti, had arranged the marriage, expecting that Francesca was to inherit parts of her father's domains, because she had no legitimate brothers. According to canon law, the marriage was incestuous, because Maddalena was Niccolò Acciaioli's niece, but its legality was never questioned.

== Sources ==
- Fine, John V. A. Jr. (1994) [1987]. The Late Medieval Balkans: A Critical Survey from the Late Twelfth Century to the Ottoman Conquest. Ann Arbor, Michigan: University of Michigan Press. ISBN 978-0-472-10079-8.
- Lock, Peter (1995). The Franks in the Aegean, 1204–1500. Longman. ISBN 0-582-05140-1.
- Setton, Kenneth M. (1975). "The Catalans and Florentines in Greece, 1380–1462". In Setton, Kenneth M.; Hazard, Harry W. (eds.). The History of the Crusades, Volume Three: The Fourteenth and Fifteenth Centuries. The University of Wisconsin Press. pp. 225–277. ISBN 0-299-06670-3.
- Stathakopoulos, Dionysios (2018). "Sister, Widow, Consort, Bride: Four Latin Ladies in Greece (1330–1430)". In Lymberopoulou, Angeliki (ed.). Cross-Cultural Interaction Between Byzantium and the West, 1204–1669: Whose Mediterranean Is It Anyway?. Routledge. pp. 236–. ISBN 978-0-8153-7267-7.
- Zečević, Nada (2014). The Tocco of the Greek Realm: Nobility, Power and Migration in Latin Greece (14th-15th centuries). Makart. ISBN 978-86-87115-11-8.
