= Nerio II Acciaioli =

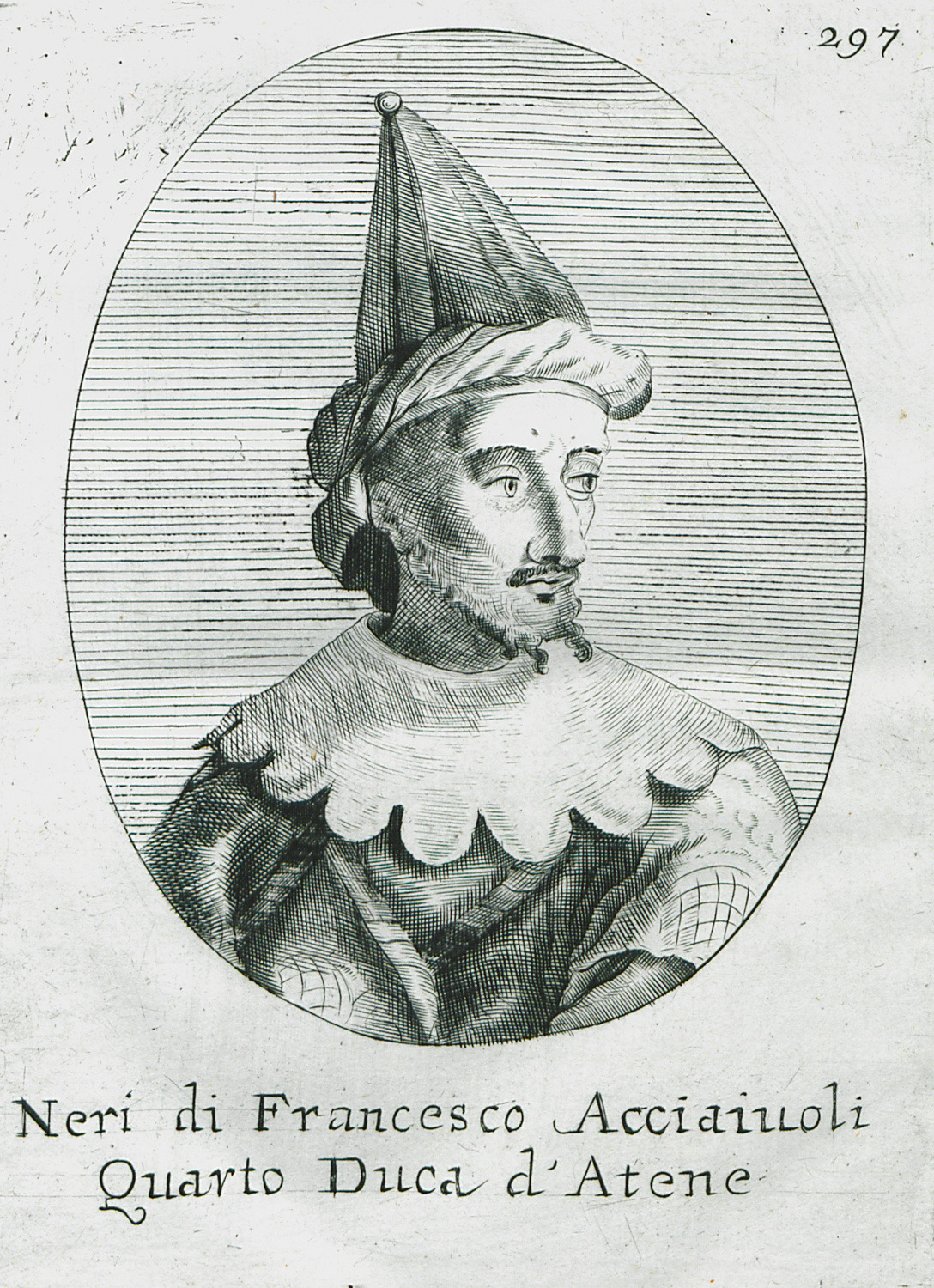
- Nerio II as depicted in a late-17th-century book

Duke of Athens
- Reign: 1435–1439, 1441–1451
- Predecessor: Antonio I Acciaioli
- Successor: Antonio II Acciaioli
- Born: 1416
- Died: 1451 (aged 34–35)
- Spouse: Chiara Zorzi
- Issue: Francesco I Acciaioli
- House: Acciaioli
- Father: Francesco lord of Sykaminon
- Mother: Margareta Malpigli
- Religion: Roman Catholic

Nerio II Acciaioli (1416–1451) was the Duke of Athens on two separate occasions from 1435 to 1439 and again from 1441 to 1451.

He was a member of the Acciaioli family of Florence, the son of Francesco Lord of Sykaminon, who was cousin to Antonio I Acciaioli Duke of Athens. His mother was Margareta Malpigli. Nerio II's rule was contemporaneous with a renewed Italian philhellenism and corresponding interest in antiquities and the Greek language. Nerio not only spoke Greek naturally, but also owned the most famous monuments of the Hellenic world in his capital of Athens.

Nerio arrived in Greece in 1419 on the death of his father when he was only three years old. He was named heir to his uncle Antonio I of Athens, but on his uncle's death in 1435, he had to fight his uncle's widow Maria Melissene and the Chalkokondyles for the ducal throne. While George Chalkokondyles, the father of the Laonikos Chalkokondyles was pressing her suit before Murad II, the Ottoman sultan, the leading men of Athens tricked Maria into leaving the Acropolis then handed the title to Nerio. Maria and George Chalkokondyles' family were banished from Athens. After securing his position with Turkish help, he was removed by the intrigues of his brother Antonio II and driven from the Acropolis. His inveterate personal enemy, the historian Laonikos Chalkokondyles, denigrates him as "effeminate."

Nerio returned to power in 1441 on the death of his brother, after spending a few years in Florence. He immediately expelled his brother's widow Maria Zorzi. It is probably that Nerio was present when the Emperor John VIII made a proclamation of Catholicism in the Florentine Duomo on 6 July 1439. In 1444, Nerio went to war against the Turks on the side of the despot Constantine, but came to terms with the Ottomans. He subsequently lost Thebes to Constantine and was forced to pay him tribute and become his vassal. In 1446, Murad assisted Nerio in retaking Thebes for the Latins. On his death, he was succeeded by his young son Francesco under the regency of his widow Chiara Zorzi.
