= Francesco I Acciaioli =

15th-century Duke of Athens

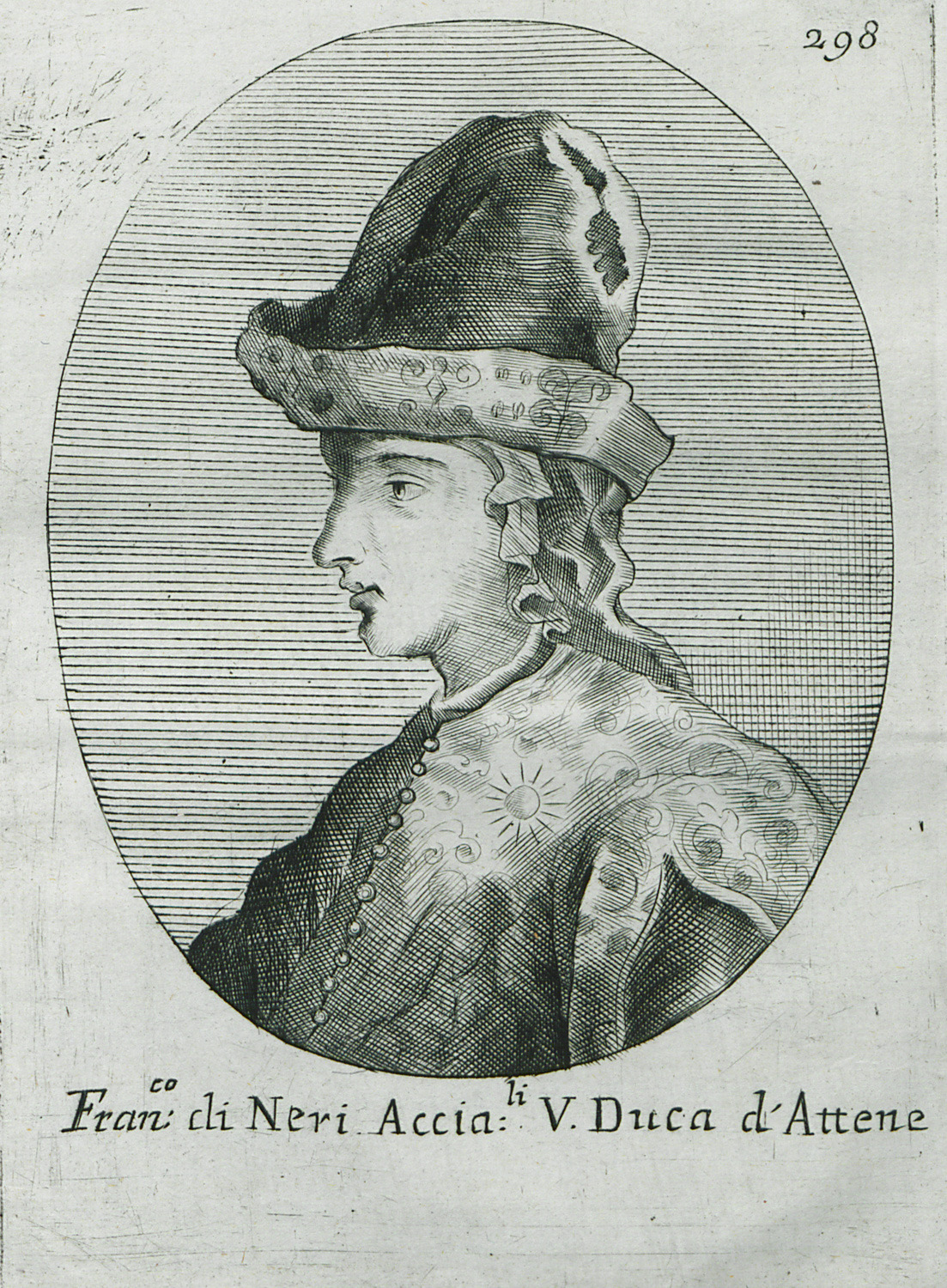
Francensco I Acciaioli

Francis or Francesco I Acciaioli was the son of Nerio II Acciaioli by his second wife Chiara Zorzi. He succeeded on his father's death in 1451 to the Duchy of Athens under his mother's regency.

His mother married the Venetian Bartolomeo Contarini (1453). However, Mehmet II, the Ottoman sultan, intervened at the insistence of the people on the behalf of the young duke Francis and summoned Bartolomeo and Chiara to his court at Adrianople. Another Acciaioli, Francesco II, was sent to Athens as a Turkish client duke. Evidently, the citizenry had mistrusted the two lovers influence over the young duke, for whose safety they may have feared. The young Francesco I remained at the court of the Ottoman sultan.
