= Nerio I Acciaioli =

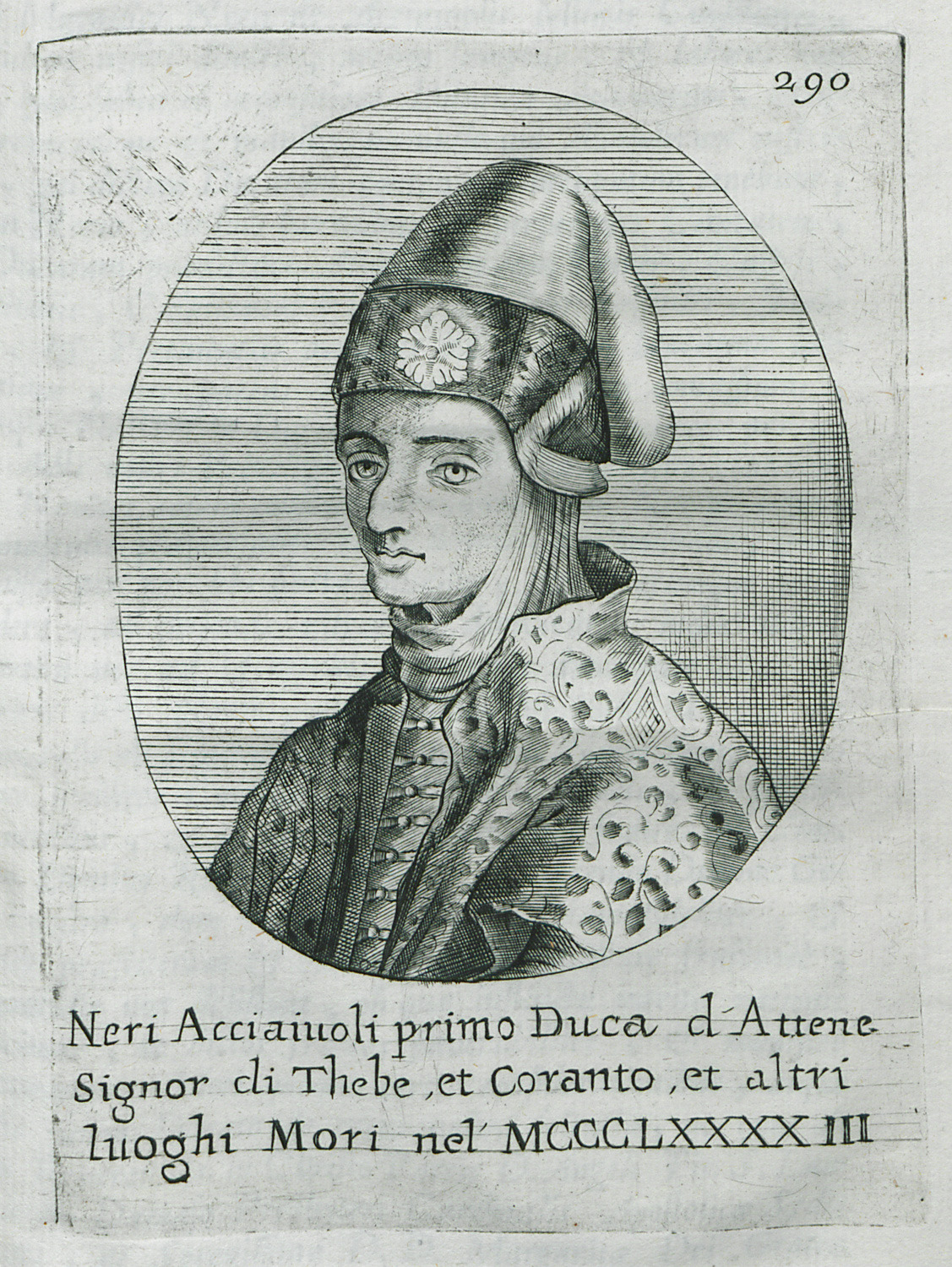
- Nerio I as depicted in a late-17th-century book

Lord/Duke of Athens contesting Peter the Ceremonious till 1387
- Reign: 1385/1394–1394
- Predecessor: Peter the Ceremonious

Duke of Neopatras
- Reign: 1390–1393
- Predecessor: John the Hunter
- Died: 25 September 1394; Athens, Duchy of Athens
- Burial: Church of Saint Mary, Athens
- Spouse: Agnes de' Saraceni
- Issue: Bartolomea Acciaioli; Francesca Acciaioli (illeg.) Antonio I Acciaioli
- House: Acciaioli
- Father: Jacobo Acciaioli
- Mother: Bartolomea Riccasoli
- Religion: Roman Catholic

Nerio I Acciaioli or Acciajuoli (full name Rainerio; died 25 September 1394) served as the de facto Duke of Athens from 1385 to 1388 and ruled uncontested until his death in 1394. Born into a family of Florentine bankers, he became the principal agent of his influential kinsman Niccolò Acciaioli in Frankish Greece in 1360. He acquired extensive estates in the Principality of Achaea, which he administered independently of the absent princes. In 1374 or 1375, he hired mercenaries and captured Megara, a strategically significant fortress within the Catalan-ruled Duchy of Athens. His forces invaded the duchy again in 1385, driving back the Catalans to the Acropolis, which they were ultimately compelled to surrender in 1388.

Nerio and his son-in-law, Theodore I Palaiologos, Despot of the Morea, invaded the Lordship of Argos and Nauplia in the Peloponnese. Nerio seized Nauplia, but the Venetians soon expelled his troops from the town. In 1389, he was captured by the Navarrese mercenary commander Pedro de San Superano, and released only after pledging to support the Venetian effort to take Argos from Theodore. As security for this promise, he ceded parts of his domains to Venice, though he failed to persuade his son-in-law to surrender Argos. In 1390, Nerio's forces captured the Duchy of Neopatras from the Catalans, but the Ottoman sultan Bayezid I conquered the territory in 1393, after which Nerio paid him an annual tribute for Athens. On 11 January 1394, King Ladislaus of Naples, who claimed suzerainty over Frankish Greece, invested Nerio with the Duchy of Athens. In his last will, Nerio divided his possessions among his younger daughter, Francesca, his illegitimate son, Antonio, and the Church of Saint Mary (the Parthenon) of Athens.

== Early life ==
Nerio (or Rainerio) was the second son of Jacobo Acciaioli and Bartolomea Riccasoli. The Acciaioli were a Florentine banking dynasty, frequent creditors to the Angevin monarchs of Naples in the 14th century, and also instrumental in managing Angevin finances in Frankish Greece. Their first branch in the Principality of Achaea was established in 1331. Jacobo's second cousin, Niccolò Acciaioli, was a trusted confidant of Catherine of Valois-Courtenay, titular Latin Empress of Constantinople. With Niccolò's backing, her son, Robert of Taranto, acquired Achaea in 1332. Over the following decades, Niccolò amassed extensive estates there, but his children showed little interest in Greek affairs. In 1359, he resolved to leave his Italian holdings to Nerio despite their relatively distant kinship.

== Aristocrat ==
In May 1360, Niccolò Acciaioli secured the appointment of Nerio's younger brother, John, as Archbishop of Patras in Achaea from Pope Innocent VI; Nerio was dispatched to the Peloponnese to oversee his brother's installation. The following year, Niccolò and John sought to arrange Nerio's marriage to Florence Sanudo, Duchess of the Archipelago. Although the plan was supported by Florence's overlords, Queen Joan I of Naples and Robert of Taranto, who forbade her to marry without their consent, it ultimately came to nothing when the Venetians abducted her. Taken first to Crete and then to Venice, she was married instead to her cousin, Nicholas II Sanudo, in 1364.

Niccolò adopted Nerio as his son in 1362. In two years, Marie of Bourbon, wife of Robert of Taranto, sold the Achaean baronies of Vostitza and Nivelet to Nerio for 6,000 ducats, giving him control of the coastline between Corinth and Patras. (Note: At the time, 6,000 ducats were equivalent to approximately c. 1,440,000 deniers tournois; however, any attempt to determine their modern monetary value is inherently impracticable.) On 8 November 1365, Niccolò died, leaving Corinth to his eldest son, Angelo, though he soon mortgaged it to Nerio, who established himself in the town. From then on, Nerio was the de facto ruler of northeastern Achaea. Philip of Taranto, Robert's successor as Prince of Achaea, confirmed Angelo's hereditary right to Corinth in 1371, but neither Angelo nor his heirs redeemed the town from Nerio. In November 1372, Pope Gregory XI referred to Nerio as "lord of the town of Corinth", recognising him as its ruler. Nerio was among the Christian leaders whom the Pope urged to form an alliance against the Ottomans, but internal rivalries prevented their attendance at a planned crusader congress in Thebes.

== Conquests ==
In 1373, Joan I of Naples, who had inherited Achaea from Philip of Taranto, confirmed Nerio's possessions and titles within the principality. Nerio exploited tensions between the Catalans of the Duchy of Athens and the officials whom Frederick the Simple, King of Sicily, had appointed to administer the duchy. With the support of Megara's burghers, Nerio captured the town and imprisoned its Catalan commander, Francis Lunel, in late 1374 or early 1375. Strategically located, Megara controlled the road from the Peloponnese towards Thebes and Athens.

In the summer of 1376, Joan I leased Achaea to the Knights Hospitallers for five years; in June 1378, the Hospitallers engaged the Navarrese Company, a body of mercenaries from Navarre, Gascony, and Italy. Nerio established contact with one of their commanders, Juan de Urtubia, persuading him to launch an invasion of the Duchy of Athens in early 1379. The Navarrese laid siege to Thebes, and by June, the townspeople allied with Nerio had convinced the garrison to surrender.

The Catalans of Athens convened a general assembly and recognised King Peter IV of Aragon as their lawful ruler on 20 May 1380. The Navarrese pressed on with their campaign, capturing Livadeia in late 1380 or 1381. Nerio subsequently seized both Thebes and Livadeia from them, though the exact date is uncertain. The historian Kenneth Setton suggests he most likely purchased Thebes from two Navarrese commanders, Pedro de San Superano and Berard de Varvassa, following the death of Urtubia in 1381. San Superano and Varvassa then returned to Achaea, where they swore fealty to James of Baux, nephew of Philip of Taranto and claimant to the principality. Nerio reached a settlement with Peter IV's vicar-general, Philip Dalmau, who departed from Athens in the spring of 1382. Meanwhile, the Navarrese began extending their authority towards Corinth, prompting Nerio to forge an alliance with Theodore I Palaiologos, Despot of the Morea, against them. The alliance was sealed by Theodore's marriage to Nerio's elder daughter, Bartolomea, who was regarded as his heir in Corinth. He also entered into negotiations with Venetian officials on Euboea to coordinate joint operations against the Turks, whose raids continued to devastate the Greek coasts.

In 1385, Nerio's forces invaded the Duchy of Athens, occupying much of Attica and Boeotia. They seized the lower town of Athens but failed to take the Acropolis, which was held by Dalmau's deputy, Raymond de Vilanova. According to the historian Peter Lock, Nerio captured Thebes from the Navarrese during the siege of the Acropolis. A Venetian record of 7 July 1385 referred to him as "ruler of Corinth and the Duchy of Athens", while in a grant of 15 January 1387 he styled himself "lord of the castellany of Corinth, the Duchy of Athens and their dependencies". Both attest to his effective control of most of the duchy from 1385.

Nerio, with Venetian support, defeated a band of Turkish raiders on 6 February 1386. On 17 April the following year, John I of Aragon—Peter IV's successor—offered to renew the peace, yet Nerio's forces continued the siege of the Acropolis even after plague forced him to withdraw to Thebes. As securing the duchy had become his overriding aim, he sought to cut costs by withholding part of the rent owed for Venetian galleys hired against the Turks. The indignant Venetians accused him of encouraging Turkish attacks on their territories in the autumn of 1387.

== Duke of Athens ==
Principal sites on the Peloponnese in the Middle Ages

Nerio's troops captured the Acropolis on 2 May 1388, ending Catalan rule in Athens. He appointed Italian and Greek officials to administer the duchy, established Greek as the language of government, and permitted the Orthodox archbishop of Athens to settle in the lower town. The Catalans, however, retained the Duchy of Neopatras.

Nerio sent troops to continue the conquest of Catalan territories, but his alliance with Theodore I Palaiologos soon placed him in conflict with Venice. In 1388, Pietro Cornaro, jure uxoris ('by right of wife') Lord of Argos and Nauplia, died. His widow, Maria of Enghien, entered negotiations to transfer the lordship to Venice. Before the sale was concluded, Theodore occupied Argos and Nerio seized Nauplia. Maria formally sold the lordship to Venice on 12 December 1388. The Venetians allied with Pedro de San Superan and Paolo Foscari, Archbishop of Patras, and dispatched commissioners to take possession of both towns. They secured Nauplia, but failed to compel Theodore to surrender Argos. Venice responded by prohibiting the export of iron and ploughshares to Athens and the Morea, later extending the ban to figs and currants from Athens on 22 June 1389.

San Superan invited Nerio to Vostitza—by then an important fortress of the Navarrese Company—to negotiate over Argos. Nerio accepted, but on 10 September 1389, San Superan seized him and confined him in the castle of Listrina near Vostitza. Nerio's brother, Donato Acciaioli, persuaded the Florentine government to send envoys to Venice demanding his release. In early 1390, Amadeus of Savoy, claimant to the Principality of Achaea, also assured Donato of his support. Donato offered Athens, Thebes, and movable property as security to the Venetians in return for their assistance in securing Nerio's freedom through the surrender of Argos.

On 22 May 1390, the Venetian castellan of Modon and Coron, together with other Venetian officials, met Nerio near Vostitza. Nerio undertook to persuade his son-in-law, Theodore I, to yield Argos. He ceded Megara to Venice, sent his daughter Francesca as a hostage to Euboea, and pledged his personal property in Corinth. He also appropriated church revenues to raise the ransom demanded by the Navarrese. These measures secured his release in late 1390. Nerio, however, was unable to compel Theodore to surrender Argos, bringing their alliance to an end.

Nerio's forces captured Neopatras before the end of 1390. In 1391, King Ladislaus of Naples appointed him vicar-general of Achaea and Lepanto, although Ladislaus exercised no actual authority in the principality. That same year, Amadeus of Savoy dispatched envoys to Athens to secure Nerio's support in his bid for Achaea. On 29 December 1391, Nerio acknowledged Amadeus as his suzerain in return for a pledge to restore his Achaean estates, yet Amadeus was never able to assert his authority in the principality. Nerio subsequently sent Lodovico Aliotti, Catholic archbishop of Athens, to negotiate with Ladislaus for the formal recognition of his rule in Athens. Ladislaus accepted and, on 11 January 1394, conferred the Duchy of Athens upon Nerio and his legitimate male heirs.

Ottoman Sultan Bayezid I launched an invasion of Thessaly in late 1393, capturing Neopatras and Livadeia. In early 1394, Nerio agreed to pay the Sultan an annual tribute. Falling gravely ill, he made his last will on 17 September, described by the historian Peter Topping as "eccentric". He bequeathed Athens to the Church of Saint Mary (the Parthenon) and ordered the restitution of church property he had previously seized to pay his ransom. He named his younger daughter, Francesca, as his principal heiress, granting only money to his elder daughter, Bartolomea, and left Thebes and Livadeia to his illegitimate son, Antonio. Nerio died on 25 September 1394 and was buried in the Parthenon. His title of Duke of Athens passed to his brother, Donato, but an Ottoman attack on Athens soon compelled Donato to cede the city to Venice.

== Family ==
Nerio's wife, Agnes de' Saraceni, was the daughter of Saraceno de' Saraceni, a Venetian burgher residing in Euboea. They married before 1381. During Nerio's captivity, she administered Athens and Corinth and sent James Petri, Bishop of Argos, to Venice to secure his release in 1389. She died before Nerio made his last will.

Of their two daughters, the elder, Bartolomea, was renowned for her beauty, according to the Byzantine historian Laonikos Chalkokondyles. She married Theodore I in 1385. Her younger sister, Francesca, became the wife of Carlo I Tocco. Nerio's favouritism towards Francesca in his last will provoked a conflict between his two sons-in-law, as Bartolomea claimed Corinth for herself. Nerio's illegitimate son, Antonio, born to his lover Maria Rendi, seized the Duchy of Athens in 1403.

== Sources ==
- Fine, John V. A. (1994). The Late Medieval Balkans: A Critical Survey from the Late Twelfth Century to the Ottoman Conquest. The University of Michigan Press. ISBN 978-0-472-08260-5.
- Lock, Peter (1995). The Franks in the Aegean, 1204–1500. Longman. ISBN 978-0-582-05140-9.
- Setton, Kenneth M. (1975). "The Catalans in Greece, 1311–1380; The Catalans and Florentines in Greece, 1380–1462". In Setton, Kenneth M.; Hazard, Harry W. (eds.). The Fourteenth and Fifteenth Centuries. The History of the Crusades. Vol. Three. The University of Wisconsin Press. pp. 167–277. ISBN 978-0-299-06670-3.
- Topping, Peter (1975). "The Morea, 1311–1364; The Morea, 1364–1460". In Setton, Kenneth M.; Hazard, Harry W. (eds.). The Fourteenth and Fifteenth Centuries. The History of the Crusades. Vol. Three. The University of Wisconsin Press. pp. 104–166. ISBN 978-0-299-06670-3.

Nerio I Acciaioli Acciaioli Died: 17 September 1594
Regnal titles
Preceded by Peter the Ceremonious	— DISPUTED — Lord/Duke of Athens; 1385/1394–1394; Disputed by Peter the Ceremonious	Vacant Venetian occupation Title next held by Antonio I Acciaioli
Preceded by John the Hunter	Duke of Neopatras; 1390–1393	Ottoman occupation
