= John Kantakouzenos (despot) =

John Kantakouzenos (Greek: Ἱωάννης Καντακουζηνός; ca. 1342 – after 1380) was a Byzantine prince.

John is an obscure figure. Born ca. 1342, he was the eldest son of Matthew Kantakouzenos, co-emperor of the Byzantine Empire in 1353–1357, and Irene Palaiologina. On Matthew's abdication from the throne in December 1357, John V Palaiologos, now sole emperor, raised John to the supreme court rank of Despot.

Little is known of John Kantakouzenos thereafter: in 1361 he went to the Morea, where he is again recorded ca. 1380 as the donor of an icon of the Theotokos, now in the church of San Samuele in Venice.

He may have been the father of Theodore Kantakouzenos, the Byzantine ambassador to France and Venice.

== Sources ==
- Guilland, Rodolphe (1959). "Recherches sur l'histoire administrative de l'Empire byzantin: Le despote, δεσπότης". Revue des études byzantines (in French). 17: 52–89. doi:10.3406/rebyz.1959.1199.
- Trapp, Erich; Walther, Rainer; Beyer, Hans-Veit; Sturm-Schnabl, Katja (1981). "10972. Καντακουζηνός Ἱωάννης". Prosopographisches Lexikon der Palaiologenzeit (in German). Vol. 5. Vienna: Verlag der Österreichischen Akademie der Wissenschaften.
