= Francesco II Acciaioli =

Duke of Athens (died 1460)

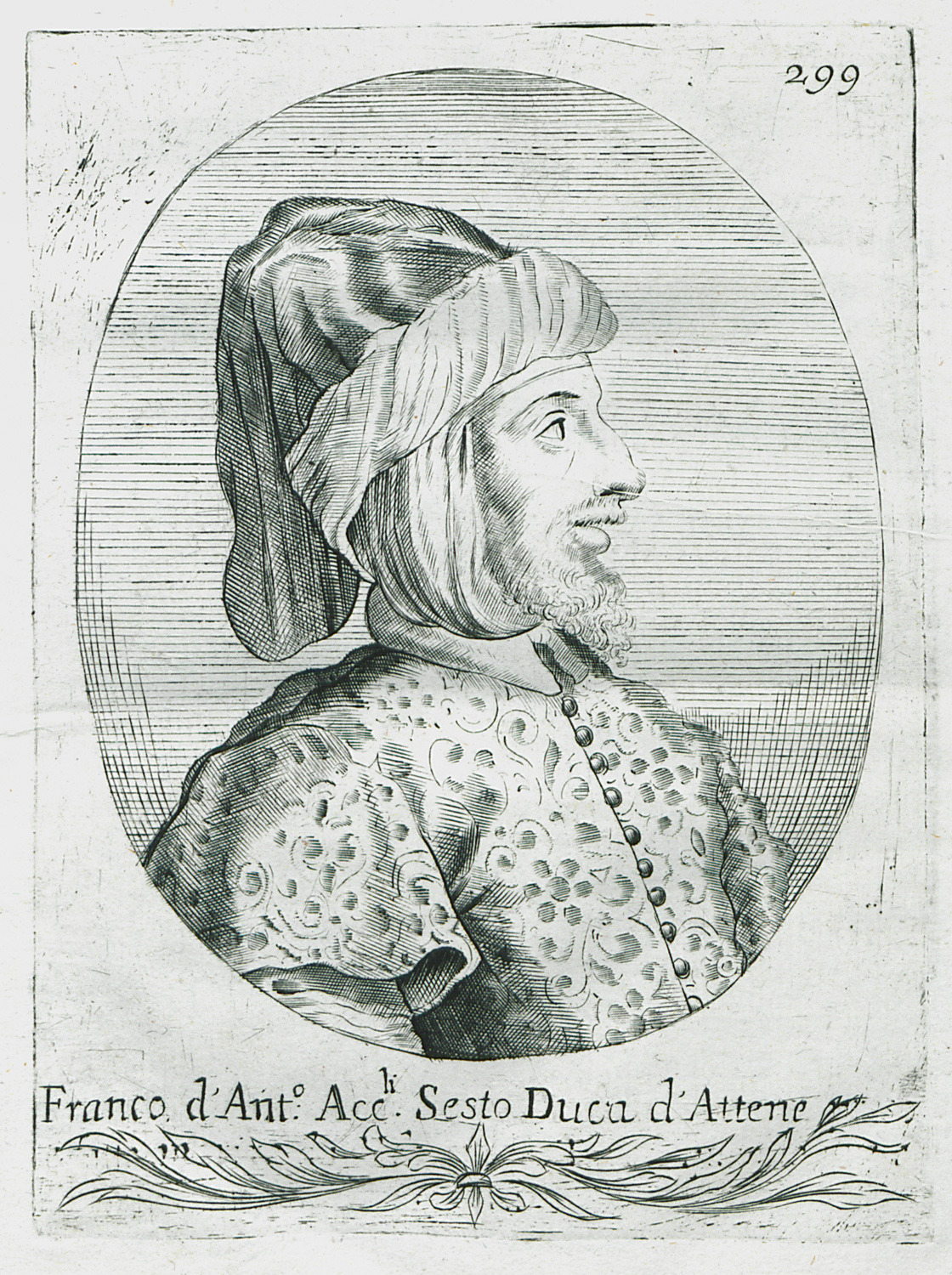
- Nerio II as depicted in a late-17th-century book

Duke of Athens
- Reign: 1455 – 1458
- Predecessor: Francesco I Acciaioli
- Successor: John II of Aragon (titular)
- Died: 1460
- House: Acciaioli
- Father: Antonio II Acciaioli
- Mother: Maria Zorzi

Francesco II Acciaioli (died 1460), called Franco, was the last Duke of Athens. He was the son of Duke Antonio II Acciaioli and Maria Zorzi but had only ruled for two years (1455–1456) when the Turkish army under Turahanoğlu Ömer Bey arrived in Athens. The duke and his citizens hid themselves in the Acropolis and held out against the Turks until June 1458, when they were forced to surrender. Mehmed II entered Athens in August 1458, and allowed Franco to retain lordship of Thebes as his vassal.

In 1460, Mehmed was informed by his Janissaries of a plot to place Franco once more in Athens. Franco was summoned to the Morea by Zaganos Pasha, one of the sultan's governors. After a long night of entertainment, Zaganos Pasha told Franco that his last hour had struck. Franco's last request was to be killed in his own tent, which was honored.

Preceded by Francesco I Acciaioli	Duke of Athens; 1455–1460	Succeeded by Annexed by Ottoman Empire
