= Acciaioli family =

Italian noble family

Coat of arms of the Acciaioli family

The Acciaioli family, also spelled Acciaiuoli, Accioly, Aciole, Acciajuoli or Acioli was an important Italian noble family from Florence, whose members were the ruling Dukes of Athens.

== History ==
Family name is also written Acciaioli, Acciainoli, or Accioly, Accioli, Aciole, Acioli and Acyoly in Portugal and Brazil, where there are branches of it. Descent can be traced in an unbroken line from one Gugliarello Acciaioli in the 12th century; family legend says that Gugliarello (a name possibly derived from It. guglia, needle) migrated from Brescia to Florence in 1160 because they were Guelphs and fled Barbarossa's invasion of Northern Italy.

The Acciaioli founded a powerful bank in the 13th century (Compagna di Ser Leone degli Acciaioli e de' suoi consorti) which had branches from Greece to Western Europe until the bank collapsed in 1345.

Bishop Angiolo Acciaioli briefly ruled Florence in the mid-14th century after the deposition of Gauthier de Brienne. Later they associated themselves to the Albizzi and then to the elder Medici in the 15th century. From about 1390 to 1460 they ruled the Duchy of Athens and kept close ties with the younger branch of the Medici through the marriage of Laudomia Acciaioli to Pierfrancesco de' Medici, from which the later Grand Dukes of Tuscany are descended, as well as several royal houses. In Florence, the Lungarno degli Acciaioli borders the Arno from the Ponte Vecchio to the Ponte Santa Trinita.

Simone di Zanobi Acciaioli migrated before 1512 to the island of Madeira where he represented the family's commercial interests. The Portuguese and Brazilian Accioly, Accioli,Aciole or Acioli family is descended from him and were part of the Portuguese nobility.

== Notable members ==
- Angelo Acciaioli I (1298–1357), bishop
- Angelo Acciaioli II (1349–1408), cardinal
- Angelo Acciaioli di Cassano (died 1467), diplomat
- Antonio I Acciaioli (died 1435), Duke of Athens
- Antonio II Acciaioli (died 1445), Duke of Athens
- Donato Acciaioli (1428–1478), scholar
- Francesco I Acciaioli (floruit 1451–1453), Duke of Athens
- Francesco II Acciaioli (died 1460), last Duke of Athens
- Giovanni Acciaioli (floruit 1422), archbishop of Thebes
- Giovanni Acciaiuoli (died 1527)
- Maddalena Aceiaiuoli (1557–1610), poet
- Nerio I Acciaioli (died 1394), first Acciaioli Duke of Athens
- Nerio II Acciaioli (1416–1451), twice Duke of Athens
- Niccolò Acciaioli (1310–1365), soldier and statesman
- Zanobi Acciaioli (1461–1519), Dominican friar and scholar

== See also ==
- Gran Tavola
- Bardi family
- Peruzzi
- House of Medici
- List of banks in Italy
