= Autremencourt =

- Commune
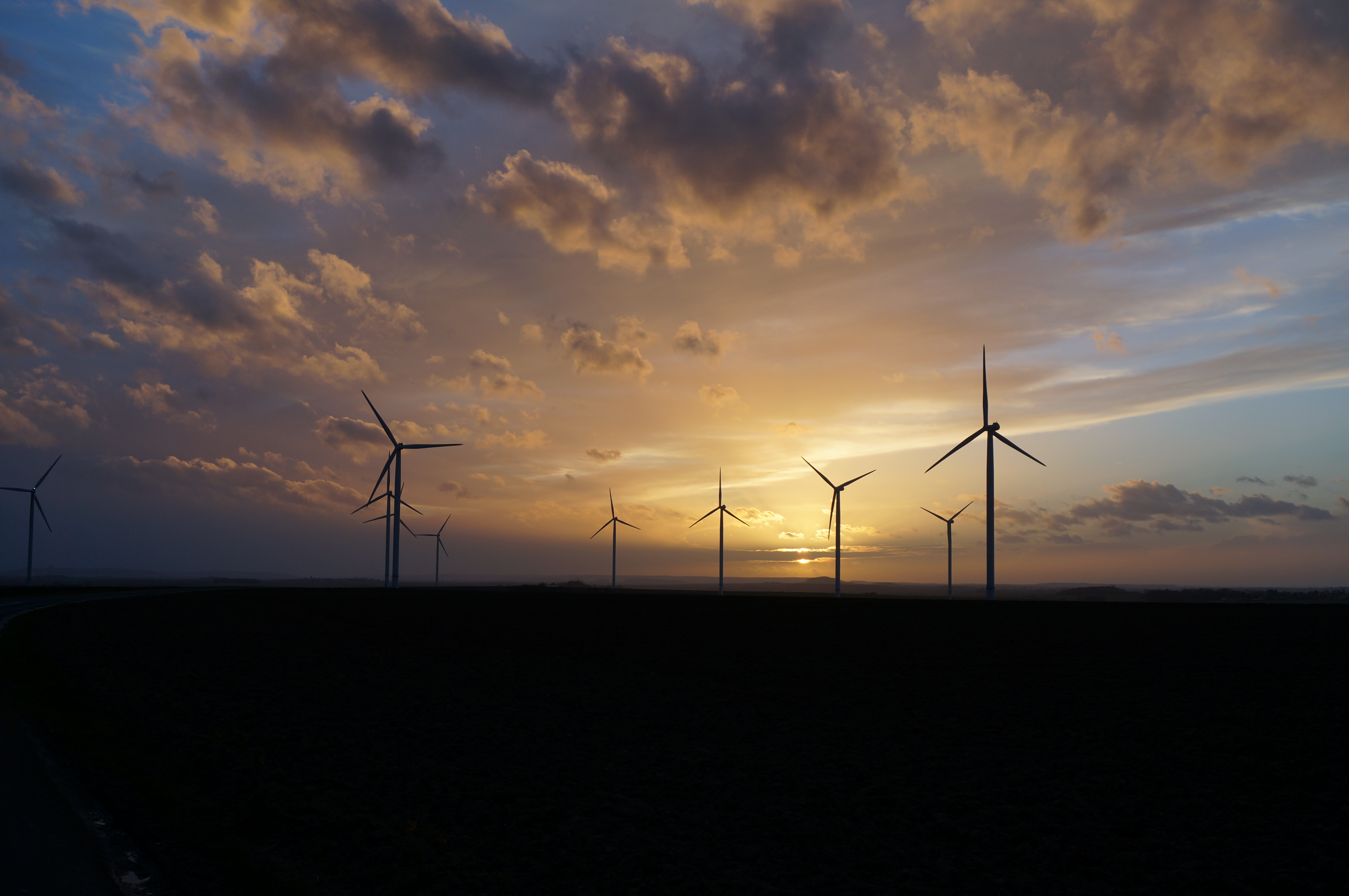
- Windmills
- Location of Autremencourt
- Location within France Location within Hauts-de-France
- Coordinates: 49°42′18″N 3°47′14″E
- Country: France
- Region: Hauts-de-France
- Department: Aisne
- Arrondissement: Laon
- Canton: Marle
- Intercommunality: Pays de la Serre

Government
  - Mayor (2026–32): Dominique Potart
- Area^{1}: 9.15 km^{2} (3.53 sq mi)
- Elevation: 102 m (335 ft)
- Highest elevation: 140 m (460 ft)
- Lowest elevation: 73 m (240 ft)
- Population (2023): 176
  - Density: 19.2/km^{2} (49.8/sq mi)
- Time zone: UTC+01:00 (CET)
  - Summer (DST): UTC+02:00 (CEST)
- INSEE/Postal code: 02039 /02250
- ^{1} French Land Register data, which excludes lakes, ponds, glaciers > 1 km^{2} (0.386 sq mi or 247 acres) and river estuaries.

Autremencourt (French pronunciation: [otʁəmɑ̃kuʁ]) is a commune in the department of Aisne in the Hauts-de-France region of northern France.

== Geography ==
=== Location ===
Autremencourt is located some 35 km east by southeast of Saint-Quentin and 25 km northeast of Laon. It can be accessed by the D64 road from La Neuville-Bosmont in the east passing through the heart of the commune and the village and continuing west to Toulis-et-Attencourt. The commune can also be accessed by the D24 road from the north passing to the east of the village and continuing south to Pierrepont. The commune is mostly farmland with a few small forests to the north-east. There are no other villages or hamlets.

The land area of the commune is 897.27 hectares, which is divided as follows:

- 857.50 hectares of arable land,
- 98.49 hectares of gardens and orchards,
- 93.50 hectares of woodland,
- 5.22 hectares of vacant land, roads, and paths
- 2.56 hectares of quarries, and watering holes

As for the land bordering Autremencourt there are Voyenne and Marle in the east, Montigny-sous-Marle in the north-east, La Neuville-Bosmont in the east, Cuirieux in the south-east, Vesles-et-Caumont in the south, and Toulis-et-Attencourt in the west.

== History ==
Shards of pottery, Roman tiles, and medals bearing the image of the emperors have been discovered in the locality of Jardins de Certeau in the territory of Autremencourt but the name of the locality (Ostremoncourt) is mentioned for the first time in 1018 in an Adalberon charter and it was in the 12th century that the first lord of the manor, Renaud de Bidane appeared.

He was succeeded by his son, Bernard, then by his son, Raoul, who came into conflict with the monks of the Abbey of Saint-Martin, and Thomas who lived in an era of war in the Greek fortress of Salona. They were the pioneers of a noble lineage of autremencourt whose profession was arms in the service of the king of France such as Yvon Bove (in 1593), companion of Balagny de Montluc and Jehan de Perponcher who died in 1613. The lords of the region often operated on the battlefield (Stoppa, for example), while Beat de Saxer occupied his lordship during the revolutionary period.

From the 14th to the 17th centuries (the Hundred Years' War, religious wars, Thirty Years' War, Spanish wars, and Dutch wars), Laon was constantly the most devastated in the history the outposts of Autremencourt suffered the common fate (attack on the night of 5 to 6 June 1652).

From the 18th century, the archives are more detailed on the daily lives in Autremencourt; on properties, businesses, housing, lawsuits and various facts.

In 1791, the commune of Autremencourt absorbed the neighbouring commune of Eraucourt by order of the Director of the Department dated 21 October 1791.

== Administration ==
List of Successive Mayors of Autremencourt

Mayors from the French Revolution to 1938

From	To	Name	Party	Position
1796	1813	Jean-François Boutroy	NC	Farmer
1813	1815	Georges Boutroy	NC	Proprietor
1815	1816	Augustin Boutroy	NC	Proprietor
1816	1848	M. Vieville	NC	Proprietor
1848	1882	François-Joseph Delval	NC	Farmer
1882	1898	Ernest Delval	NC	Farmer
1898	1910	Jules-Ernest Pasquier	Royalist	Notary
1910	1915	Raoul de Vives	NC	
1915	1915	M. Forzy	NC	
1915	1919	Henri Richet	NC	
1919	1925	M. Libert	NC	
1925	1938	Albert Bréval	NC	Proprietor

Mayors from 1938

From	To	Name	Party	Position
1938	1944	Stanislas Bréval	NC	Proprietor
1944	1945	André Potart	NC	Blacksmith
1945	1965	Stanislas Bréval	NC	Proprietor
1971	1995	Abel Gerboux	NC	Farmer
1995	Present	Dominique Potart	PS	Electrician

== Population ==
Historical population
Year	Pop.	±% p.a.
1968	193	—
1975	152	−3.35%
1982	149	−0.28%
1990	125	−2.17%
1999	162	+2.92%
2007	166	+0.31%
2012	178	+1.41%
2017	169	−1.03%
2023	176	+0.68%
Source: INSEE

== Sites and Monuments ==
- The Fortified church at the foot of the Lord's Castle
- The Chateau of Autremencourt, a lordship dating from the 12th century. The buildings were destroyed by war and rebuilt regularly until the mid 19th century. It was the Micberth family home.
- Château du Vieux Gué, built in the 19th century on the site of the fief of the same name by Meunier de Varlemont. Brigitte Ramolino de Coll Alto, a descendant of the family of Maria-Létizia Ramolino, the mother of Napoleon Bonaparte and proprietor of the Castle through her husband Stanislas Breval undertook beautification efforts, but unfortunately died prematurely. Today the property belongs to the Papillons blancs, Savart foundation
- The Chateau of the fief of Lorisse, a Folly, (also known as Chateau Richard), was built in the 19th century and destroyed by fire in the 20th century.

== Notable people linked to the commune ==
- Thomas Autremencourt (1188) took part in the Fourth Crusade in Greece and became the first Lord of Salona or La Sole (near Delphi between Parnassus and the Gulf of Corinth). He settled in the ancient acropolis of Amphissa and dwelt in the Byzantine fortress. He built a powerful castle occupying an important strategic position.
- Louis-Alexandre Stoppa of Autremencourt, was appointed major of the regiment of guards, with a captain's commission on 20 July 1695. He was awarded the Order of Saint Louis on 20 February 1700 and three years later, after the resignation of Jean-Baptiste Stoppa, he received half of the tenth company. His wife was Elisabeth-Louise Lottin de Charny, youngest daughter of Nicolas-Louis François Lottin, Count of Charny, President of the Court of aids in Paris and Louise Larcher, his first wife. He died on 6 September 1717.
- Pierre-Alexandre Stoppa, youngest son of Louis-Alexandre, knight, lord of Autremencourt, Corneil, Rebais, and other places. He was captain of the regiment of the Swiss Guards of the King, as was his father. He paid homage, as heir of his father on 26 July 1731 and took up his office on 19 January 1733. His wife was Jeanne-Marguerite Gloutz, the daughter of Jean-Victor Gloutz, Knight of Saint-Louis and himself Captain-lieutenant in the regiment of Swiss Guards and a member of the Grand Council of Solothurn, a city of the Swiss Confederation located on the Aar. They had two daughters, Agnes-Marguerite and Angélique-Madeleine Stoppa, who were maids of Autremencourt.
- Augustin Gabriel, Count of Aboville, peer of France, born 20 March 1774 in La Fere, of the Picardy branch of the family. He was a distinguished soldier and, like many of his predecessors such as Stoppa, was often in the field at the head of his troops on the land of Autremencourt. He "Came as a lieutenant in the artillery in 1789 and earned all his degrees by brilliant services in Germany, Italy, Holland, Portugal and Spain in 1813. Appointed brigadier in 1809 and an officer of the Legion of Honour, he was made commander on 23 June 1810, Knight of the Iron Crown in 1807, and Knight of Saint Louis in 1814. His marriage was contracted on 25 July 1816 with Miss Caroline-Nathalie de Drouin de Rocheplatte, daughter of the Count of Rocheplatte officer of the Legion of Honour, Mayor of Orleans and a Deputy of Loiret under the Restoration. He died in Pau on 15 October 1832. He had two sons and transmitted the legacy of his peerage prematurely to the eldest on 15 August 1820". His second son, Auguste-Ernest, Viscount of Aboville, was born in Paris on 4 December 1819, Augustine-Gabriel and Caroline-Nathalie de Drouin de Rocheplatte, decommissioned artillery lieutenant, Mayor of Glux (1858-1861), a member for Loiret of the National Assembly (1871), died at the beginning of the 20th century. He inherited Autremencourt Castle on the death of his father and sold it in 1844 to people from Crecy-sur-Serre
- Jules-Ernest Pasquier, a former MP for Aisne, Mayor of Autremencourt (1898-1910), was elected MP on 22 September 1889 under the label of conservative revisionist in "the union of the right" cemented by Georges Boulanger. He died on 11 March 1928 and was buried in the cemetery of the commune
- Michel-Georges Micberth, writer, poet, pamphleteer, editor of the series Monographs of towns and villages of France, The History Book for Lorisse

== See also ==
- Communes of the Aisne department

== Bibliography ==
- Barthélémy Dominique. Origins of feudal Laon, settlement and foundation of lordships in the 11th and 12th centuries. Departmental Archives of Aisne. (in French)
- Dewatine (Fulgenne). Monograph (Reply to geographical survey) dedicated to Autremencourt. 1883. (in French)
- Autremencourt (History of), Monographs of the towns and villages of France by Francois Richard, 2002, 14x20, br., 394 p. ISBN 2-84373-131-3
- Feudal Laon - Volume III by Maxime de Sars, 1997, reprint, 1929 20X30, BR, 790 pp. ISBN 2-84178-138-0
- Marle: History of the town and environs by Coët (Emile) and Lefevre (Charles), Ed. 1897, Repr. The History Book, 1993. (in French)
