= Michael I Komnenos Doukas =

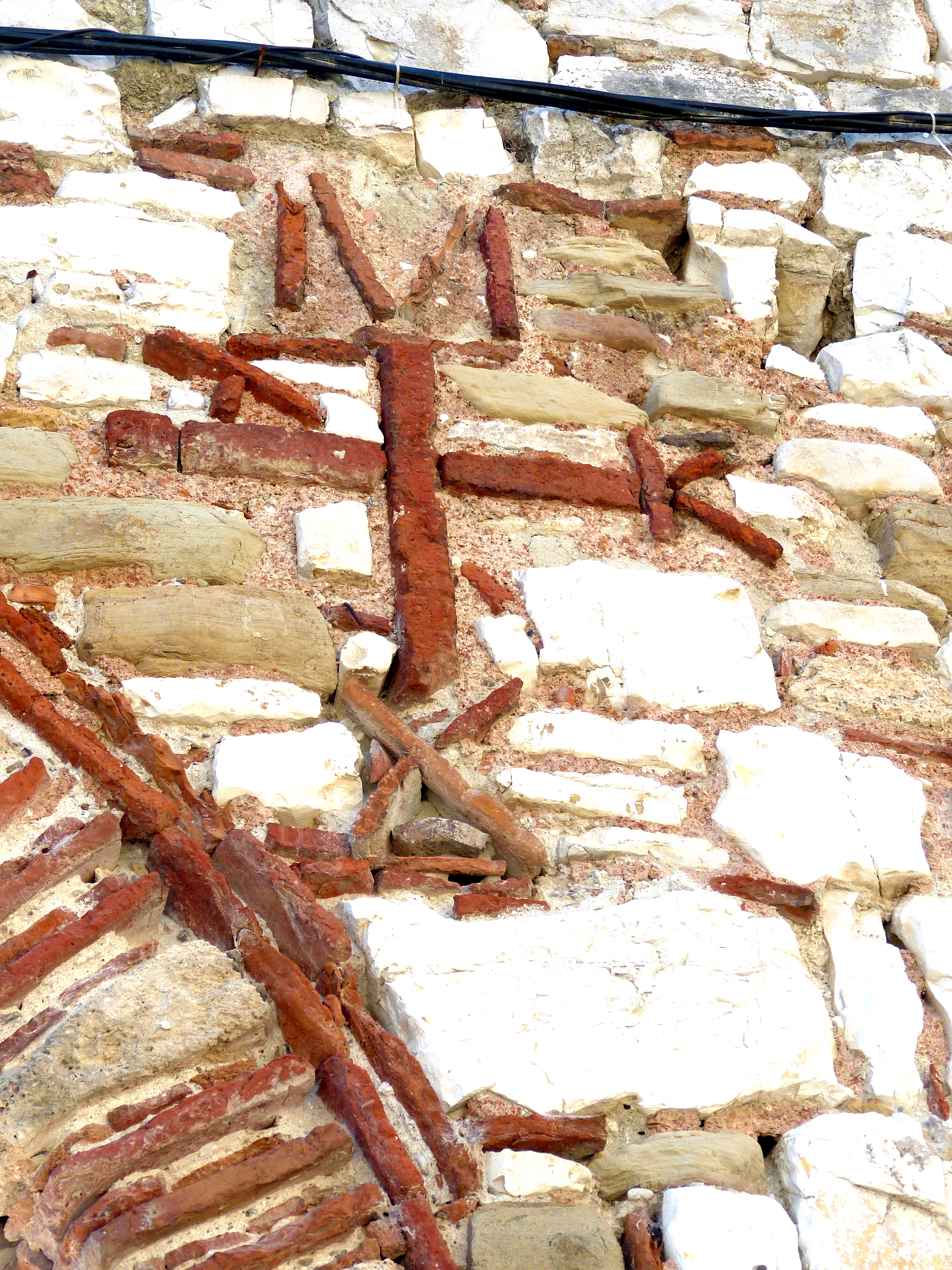
- Monogram of Michael on the walls of Berat Castle, Albania

Ruler of Epirus
- Reign: c. 1205 – 1214/15
- Predecessor: (founder)
- Successor: Theodore Komnenos Doukas
- Born: c. 1170
- Died: late 1214 or 1215
- Spouse: Melissene (first name unknown)
- Issue: Unnamed wife of Eustace of Flanders; Theodora; Constantine; Maria; Michael II Komnenos Doukas (illegitimate)
Names
- Michael I Komnenos Doukas Angelos
- Dynasty: Komnenos Doukas branch of the Angelos dynasty
- Father: John Doukas
- Religion: Greek Orthodoxy

Michael I Komnenos Doukas, Latinized as Comnenus Ducas (Greek: Μιχαήλ Κομνηνός Δούκας, romanized: Mikhaēl Komnēnos Doukas), and in modern sources often recorded as Michael I Angelos, a name he never used, was the founder and first ruler of the Despotate of Epirus from c. 1205 until his assassination in 1214/15.

Born c. 1170, Michael was a descendant of Alexios I Komnenos and a cousin of emperors Isaac II Angelos and Alexios III Angelos. He began his public career in 1190, as a hostage to the Third Crusade, and went on to serve as governor of the province of Mylasa and Melanoudion in the 1190s and again in c. 1200/01. During the latter tenure he rebelled against Alexios III but was defeated and forced to flee to the Seljuk Turks. In the aftermath of the sack of Constantinople by the Fourth Crusade in 1204, he attached himself to Boniface of Montferrat. Soon, however, he abandoned the Crusader leader and went to Epirus, where he established himself as ruler, apparently through marriage with the daughter or widow of a local magnate.

Michael's domain in Epirus became a refuge and centre of resistance of the Greeks against the Latin Crusaders. At about the same time, according to some modern scholars, he may have led the abortive Greek resistance to the Crusaders in the Peloponnese, which was crushed at the Battle of the Olive Grove of Kountouras; according to other views, he may have led a campaign there between 1207 and 1209. In order to avoid invasion and buy time to consolidate his position in Epirus, Michael soon entered into negotiations with Pope Innocent III, and concluded treaties with the Latin Empire and the Republic of Venice. In the meantime, his rule received a boost in legitimacy when he ransomed the deposed Alexios III from captivity. According to later chroniclers, Alexios III conferred the hereditary rule of Epirus to Michael and his descendants.

By 1210, Michael was secure enough to launch an attack against the Latin Kingdom of Thessalonica, in conjunction with the Bulgarians. Repelled by the intervention of the Latin Emperor Henry of Flanders, Michael quickly switched sides and joined the Latins to prevent the city from falling into Bulgarian hands. In 1212, he conquered most of Thessaly from the Lombard lords of Thessalonica. At about the same time, his troops briefly took over the Lordship of Salona. He then went on to recover Dyrrhachium and the island of Corfu from the Venetians in 1213–1214, but was thwarted in his attempt to push further north into Zeta. He was assassinated soon after in his sleep, and was succeeded by his half-brother Theodore Komnenos Doukas.

== Early life ==
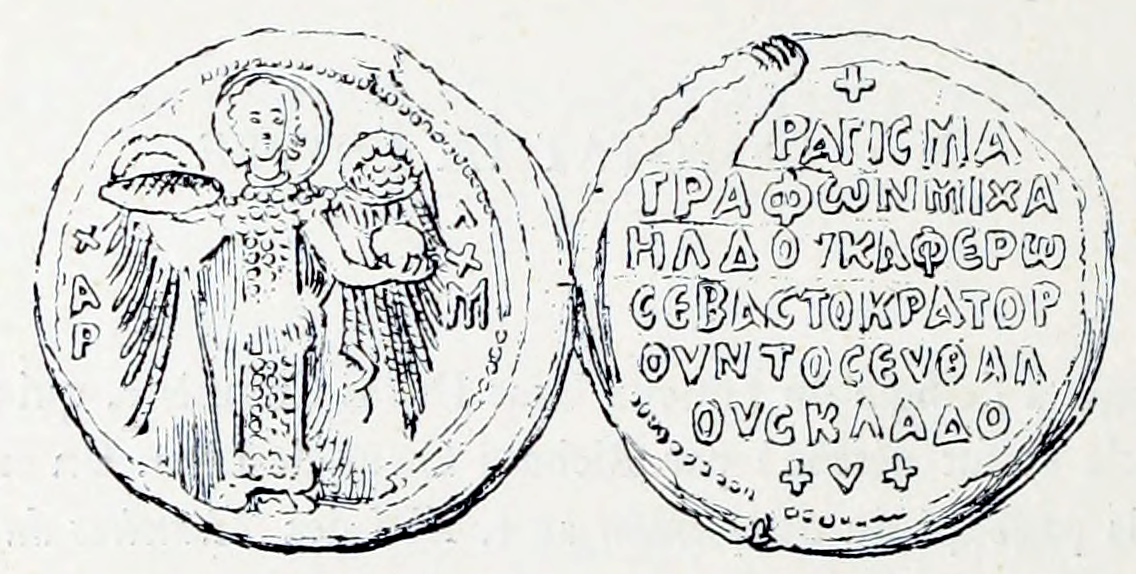
Seal of "Michael Doukas of the blossoming branch of the sebastokrator"

Michael was the illegitimate son of the sebastokrator John Doukas. His paternal grandparents were Constantine Angelos and Theodora, a daughter of Emperor Alexios I Komnenos (r. 1081–1118). Michael's uncle, Andronikos, was the father of the future emperors Isaac II Angelos (r. 1185–1195, 1203–1204) and Alexios III Angelos (r. 1195–1203), who were thus Michael's first cousins. Despite this kinship, he never used the surname "Angelos", which has been applied by some modern scholars to Michael and his dynasty. The few documents surviving from his own hand and a couple of lead seals show his name as "Michael Doukas" or "Michael Komnenos Doukas" (Μιχαήλ Κομνηνός ὁ Δούκας), evidently in an effort to emphasize his relation to the revered Doukas and Komnenos dynasties, rather than the disastrous reign of the Angeloi. The only medieval sources to use the surname "Angelos" to refer to Michael were later pro-Palaiologos historians hostile to him and the Epirote state's rival claims to the Byzantine inheritance.

It is unknown when Michael was born; the only relevant information is the statement of Niketas Choniates that he was a "young man" in 1201. The Greek scholar Konstantinos Varzos places his birth approximately in 1170. Michael is first mentioned on 14 February 1190, when he, along with other imperial relatives, served as a hostage to Frederick I Barbarossa (r. 1152–1190) during the passage of the Third Crusade through Byzantine territory. He then went on to serve as governor (doux and anagrapheus) of the theme of Mylasa and Melanoudion in Asia Minor during the last years of Isaac II's first reign. Many scholars assign him the rank of sebastos from a seal attributed to him, but this is disputed by Lucien Stiernon, as he is nowhere else mentioned with this title. Alexios III re-appointed him to the same province, probably in 1200. Demetrios Polemis, in his study on the Doukas family, reports that he was reappointed to the post by Alexios IV (r. 1203–1204), but as Varzos remarks, this is evidently an error by Polemis. In early 1201, for unknown reasons, Michael rose in revolt against the emperor. Alexios III campaigned against him in the summer 1201 and defeated him, forcing Michael to seek refuge at the court of the Seljuk Turk Sultan of Rûm, Süleymanshah II (r. 1196–1204). In his service he led Turkish raids into Byzantine territory around the Maeander River valley.

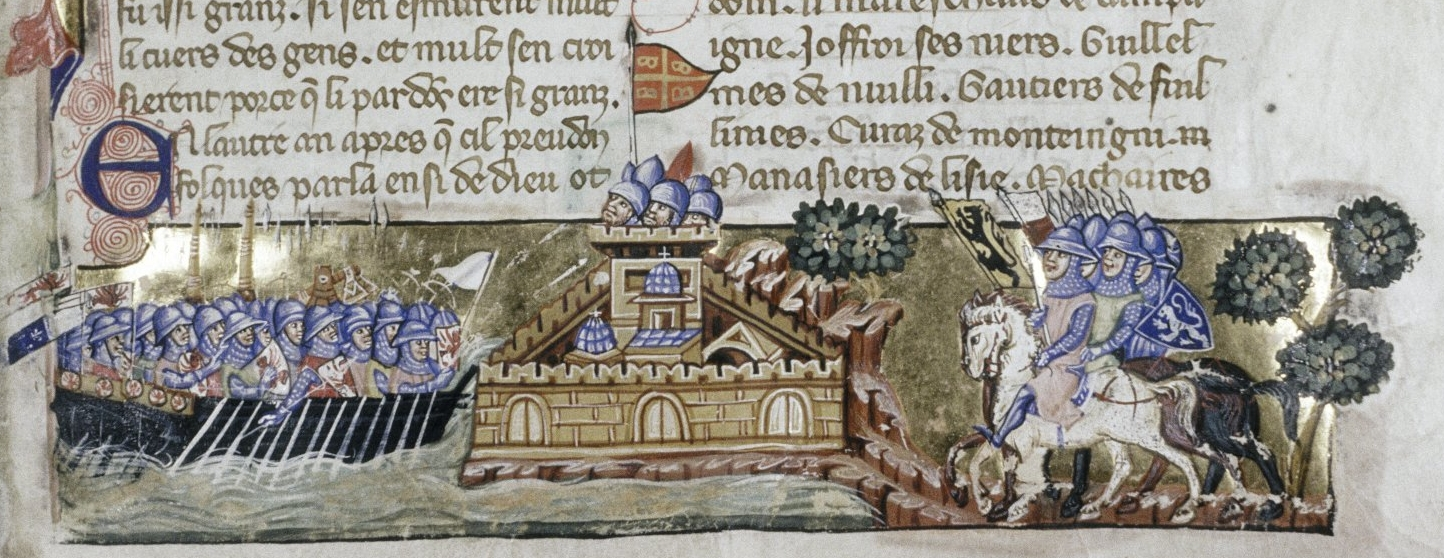
Early 14th-century miniature depicting the Crusader attack on Constantinople

According to Geoffrey of Villehardouin, a participant in the Fourth Crusade and author of De la Conquête de Constantinople, at the time of the fall of Constantinople to the forces of the Fourth Crusade, Michael was present in the city, having possibly returned from exile in the period after the deposition of Alexios III and the restoration of Isaac II and his son Alexios IV in 1203–04. Michael then entered into the service of Boniface of Montferrat, who received the Kingdom of Thessalonica and overlordship over Greece in the division of the spoils among the Crusaders, and followed Boniface west as the latter went to take up his kingdom in September 1204. Villehardouin reports that Boniface trusted Michael, but the latter soon abandoned Boniface and went to Epirus, where he installed himself as the leader of the local Greeks against the Latin Crusaders.

The process of Michael's establishment in Epirus is obscure. The hagiography of St. Theodora of Arta, written in the late 13th century, maintains that Alexios III had appointed Michael as governor in the Peloponnese and a certain Senachereim, who was Michael's relative by marriage (they both had married first cousins from the Melissenos family), as governor of the Theme of Nicopolis in Epirus. When the local inhabitants rose in revolt against him, Senachereim called upon Michael for aid. Michael rushed to Nicopolis, but not before the locals had killed Senachereim. After that, Michael, himself widowed, took Senachereim's widow as his wife and succeeded him as governor. Although generally regarded as inaccurate due to the many errors it contains, this part of the hagiography is at least partially corroborated by Villehardouin's account that he married the daughter of a local magnate. It is certain that Michael was never appointed governor of the Peloponnese, but the hagiography's reference to the peninsula has led to suggestions by modern scholars that he is to be identified with the Michael who led the Peloponnesian Greeks in the Battle of the Olive Grove of Kountouras against the Crusaders, in the summer of 1205. This commonly held identification has been questioned by more recent research by the historian Raymond-Joseph Loenertz, who suggests that Michael leaving Epirus, which still was not securely under his control, to go on campaign in the Peloponnese would have been extremely unlikely as it would leave Epirus open to attack by Boniface. Loenertz does however consider that Michael may indeed have led another expedition into the Peloponnese a few years later, in 1207–09 (see below).

== Ruler of Epirus ==
From his base at Arta, Michael proceeded to expand his control over most of the region of Epirus, including much of modern Albania, quickly establishing an independent domain encompassing the lands between Dyrrhachium (Durazzo) in the north and Naupactus in the south, bordering the Latin Kingdom of Thessalonica in the east, the possessions of the Republic of Venice to the north and west, and the Bulgarians and Serbs to the north and east. He maintained good relations with the Albanian and Vlach chieftains in the area, and their men provided able troops for his army.

The state Michael established is commonly known in historiography as the "Despotate of Epirus", and it was long thought that Michael was the first Epirote ruler to claim the title of despotes, it being surmised that he was granted the title by the deposed emperor Alexios III after his ransoming (see below). In reality, as modern research has shown, neither Michael nor his half-brother and successor, Theodore Komnenos Doukas, bore the title. It was Michael's bastard son, Michael II Komnenos Doukas, who became the first ruler of Epirus to be titled a despotes in the 1230s, while the designation of the Epirote state as a "despotate" first appears in Western, rather than Byzantine, sources in the 14th century.

=== Rapprochement with the Latin powers ===
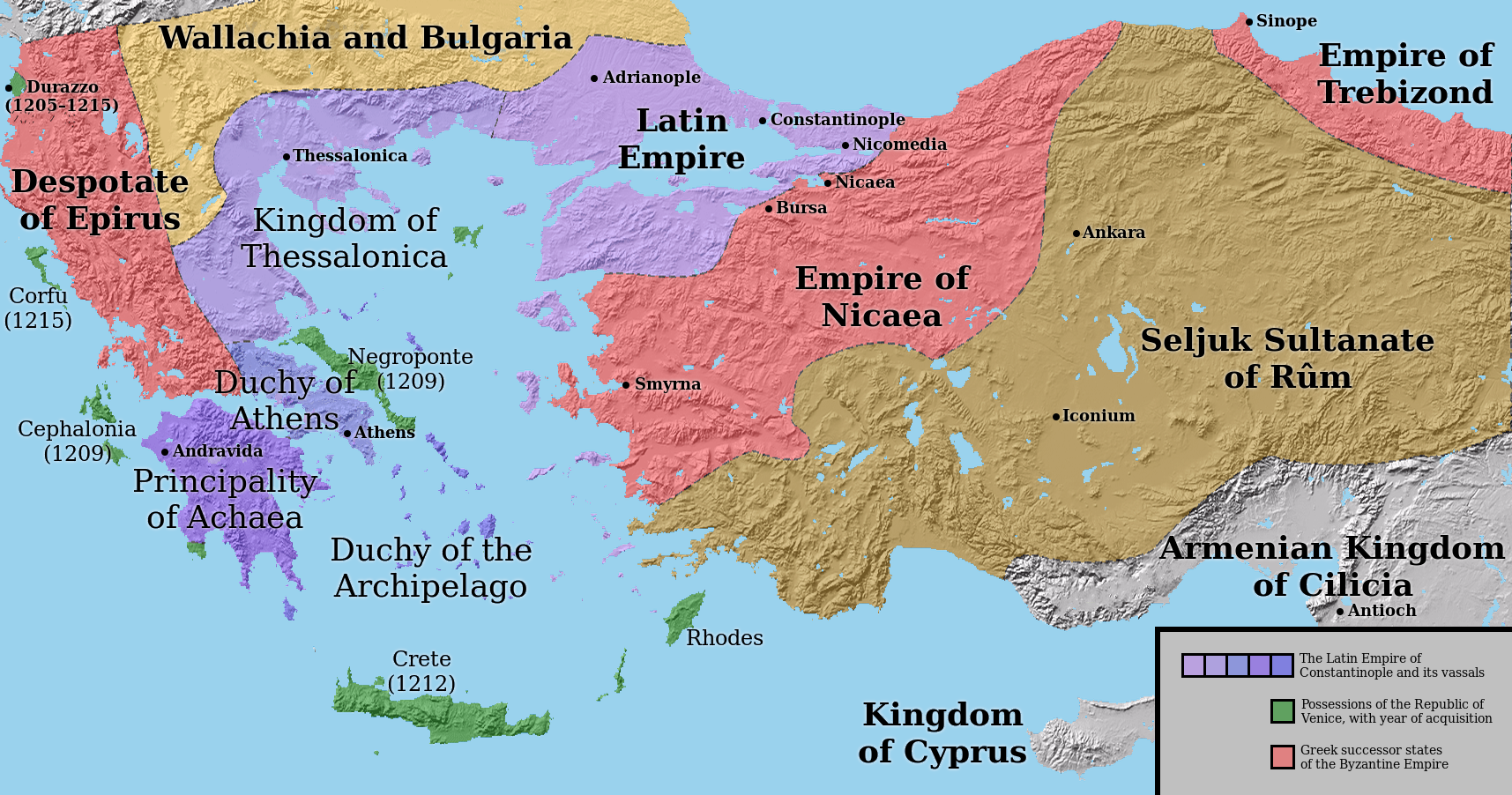
Map of the Latin principalities and the Greek successor states after the Fourth Crusade, ca. 1210

Along with the other major Greek successor state, the Empire of Nicaea in western Asia Minor, Epirus became the main Greek centre resisting Latin rule. Michael's chief preoccupation therefore was the threat posed by the Latin Crusader states and the Republic of Venice. In the treaty of partition of the Byzantine Empire among the Crusaders, Epirus had been allotted to Venice, but although it had occupied in 1205 Dyrrhachium, the chief port for the Albanian hinterland, and the island of Corfu in 1207, the maritime-minded Republic had shown little interest in the rest of its mainland. To insure himself against a Latin attack, Michael began negotiations with Pope Innocent III, hinting at a possible union of the Orthodox Church of his domains with the Roman Catholic Church. The relationship was not untroubled–in a letter of 17 August 1209, the Pope asked of "Michael Komnenos of Romania" that, if he were truly the Pope's servant, as he claimed in his letters, he should allow the Latin Archbishop of Dyrrhachium access to the estates owned by the archbishopric in Michael's domains—but it did serve for the moment to earn Michael the Pope's goodwill, as well as precious time. According to Loenertz, it also appears that at some point Michael had paid homage to the Kingdom of Thessalonica as its vassal.

Despite these diplomatic manoeuvrings, according to a series of letters of Innocent III dated to autumn 1210, Michael engaged in combat with the Prince of Achaea Geoffrey I of Villehardouin (r. 1209–1229) and his barons; the letters do not give any further details. Modern researchers have linked this reference either with his supposed leadership in the battle of Kountouras, or, more plausibly, with an abortive campaign in the Peloponnese sometime in 1207–09 in order to aid the beleaguered ruler of Argos and Corinth, Leo Sgouros, who was being besieged by the Crusaders in his citadel on the Acrocorinth. Traditionally, several scholars, such as Karl Hopf and Antoine Bon, have furthermore identified a certain Theodore, who appears as "lord of Argos" and Sgouros' successor in leading the resistance against the Crusaders, with Michael's half-brother Theodore Komnenos Doukas. Loenertz points out, however, that not only is there no evidence for such an assumption, but that Theodore Komnenos Doukas is known to have been in the service of the Nicaean emperor, Theodore I Laskaris (r. 1205–1222), at the time.

In summer 1209, after the Latin Emperor Henry of Flanders (r. 1205–1216) quelled a revolt of the Lombard barons of Thessalonica and brought the Kingdom of Thessalonica under his effective control, Michael sent envoys to propose an alliance. Henry distrusted Michael's sincerity, but sent an embassy to Epirus with his terms, which amounted to Michael declaring himself a vassal of the Latin Empire. Michael was able to sidestep an outright declaration of submission by offering the hand of his eldest daughter to the Emperor's brother, Eustace, and a third of his lands as her dowry. Henry accepted, and the peace agreement was sealed with the marriage of Eustace and Michael's daughter. Finally, in early 1210, Michael's envoys, the Bishop of Tzernikon Theodore and Symeon Kounales, met with the Venetian duke of Dyrrhachium, Marino Vallaresso, and negotiated a treaty, confirmed by oath on 20 June. Thereby Michael accepted to become a vassal of Venice, holding his lands in fief from Venice as confirmed in a charter issued by Doge Pietro Ziani (r. 1205–1229). Michael granted the Venetians extensive trading privileges and tax exemptions, just as they had enjoyed under the chrysobulls of Emperor Manuel I Komnenos (r. 1143–1180), promised to expedite the grain exports to Venice, and to assist in any shipwreck of a Venetian vessel off the Epirote coast. In addition, as a sign of his vassalage he would pay to the Venetian duke of Dyrrhachium an annual tribute of 42 litrai of gold hyperpyra in two instalments, and send annually a rich brocade for the altar of St. Mark's Basilica and one for the Doge.

=== Ransoming of Alexios III ===
At about the same time, Michael's rule received a boost in legitimacy through his ransoming of emperor Alexios III. After his deposition by the Crusaders in July 1203, Alexios with his wife Euphrosyne Doukaina Kamatera had been roaming Greece seeking protection. A marriage alliance with Leo Sgouros failed due to the latter's hasty retreat before the advance of Boniface of Montferrat. Left stranded in Thessaly, Alexios was captured by Boniface. The former emperor was initially held in comfortable captivity, but at some point he fell foul of Boniface; sources differ on whether he tried to flee to Michael's domains and was captured by Boniface's knights en route or whether Boniface simply came to distrust him as a potential rival focal point for the loyalties of the Greek population. He and his wife were then imprisoned, either in Thessalonica or, according to other sources, in Montferrat. Learning of their fate, Michael offered to ransom the former imperial couple and eventually secured their release, welcoming them at Salagora, the port of Arta, where they arrived by ship.

Michael treated the couple with every courtesy, but Alexios did not remain long in Arta. The deposed emperor was eager to regain his throne by taking over the Empire of Nicaea with the aid of the Seljuk Sultan Kaykhusraw I. Leaving his wife behind, and accompanied by Michael's half-brother Constantine Komnenos Doukas, Alexios took sail for Asia Minor. His attempt ended in complete failure in the Battle of Antioch on the Maeander in 1211, where Theodore I Laskaris killed Kaykhusraw and took Alexios prisoner. The hagiography of St. Theodora of Arta claims that on his departure, Alexios granted Michael and his descendants hereditary possession of his domain, while the 14th-century Aragonese version of the Chronicle of the Morea claims that Alexios left Michael as his lieutenant in the west. From these references some earlier scholars erroneously inferred that Michael received the title of despotes from Alexios. Lucien Stiernon, followed by Varzos, places the ransoming of Alexios in 1206/7. Loenertz on the other hand considers it a result of Michael's rapprochement with the Latins and places it in 1210, when the interests of the Latin Empire in curbing the growing power of Nicaea coincided with Michael's intention to ransom Alexios.

=== Territorial expansion ===
Expansion of the Epirote state during the reigns of Michael I and Theodore Komnenos Doukas

Michael seized the opportunity of Henry's focus on his planned campaign against Nicaea to attack Thessalonica. At the head of Latin mercenaries, he captured the constable of the Kingdom of Thessalonica and baron of Domokos, the Lombard Amé Buffa, and a hundred of his companions. He is alleged to have been excessively cruel to his prisoners, killing or whipping many of them, while Buffa, his confessor, and three other nobles were crucified. Michael's army proceeded to capture several fortresses and kill the Latin garrisons, including priests. Enraged, Henry sped to Thessalonica's aid, covering the distance from Constantinople in only twelve days. Michael in the meantime had allied himself with the Bulgarian ruler Strez, but they were defeated by Henry. It is possible that during this campaign, Henry was assisted by his vassals from Achaea, thereby explaining the reference in the Pope's correspondence of Achaean barons fighting against Michael, rather than assuming an Epirote expedition to the Peloponnese. The Latin Emperor wrested lands from both allies, but was forced to cut short his campaign and return to Constantinople, which was being threatened by the Bulgarian emperor Boril. Henry left Thessalonica in the charge of his brother Eustace and of Berthold of Katzenelnbogen, who then defeated another invasion by Strez, supported with troops from his brother Boril. Disquieted by the Bulgarian attacks on Thessalonica, Michael switched sides and joined the Latins in defeating the Bulgarians at Pelagonia. It is commonly assumed that during these conflicts, Michael terminated his vassalage to the Latin Empire; historian Philip Van Tricht however points out that there are no sources for this, and that this vassalage may have survived until 1217, when Michael's brother Theodore captured Latin Emperor Peter II of Courtenay near Dyrrhachium.

Sometime between 1210 and 1214, according to the Chronicle of Galaxeidi, Michael came into conflict with the Latin Lord of Salona, Thomas I d'Autremencourt. When d'Autremencourt seized a few islands in the Corinthian Gulf off Galaxeidi, the inhabitants of the latter called upon Michael for aid, and in the ensuing battle, Thomas was killed and Salona (modern Amfissa) was occupied. Epirote rule there proved short-lived, however, as d'Autremencourt's son Thomas II soon recovered his father's lordship. In 1212, his troops invaded Thessaly in force, overrunning the resistance of the local Lombard nobles. The Epirotes took Larissa, where they deposed the Latin Archbishop and restored the local see to an Orthodox metropolitan, Velestino, the fief of Berthold of Katzenelnbogen, and reached the shores of the Pagasetic Gulf at Demetrias. The newly gained Thessalian territories were entrusted to Michael's son-in-law Constantine Maliasenos as a hereditary appanage.

Soon after, probably in 1213, he took Dyrrhachium from Venice, followed in 1214 by Corfu. Very little is known about the details of these successes, as the generally hostile stance of the pro-Nicaean Byzantine historians towards Michael means that his achievements were often ignored. According to local Corfiot tradition, the castle of Angelokastro was built by Michael. Michael continued to push northward into Albania and Macedonia, taking Kruja and ending the independence of the principality of Arbanon and its ruler, Dimitri Progoni, but his attempt to seize Zeta was stopped by the Serbs at Skadar.

=== Death and legacy ===
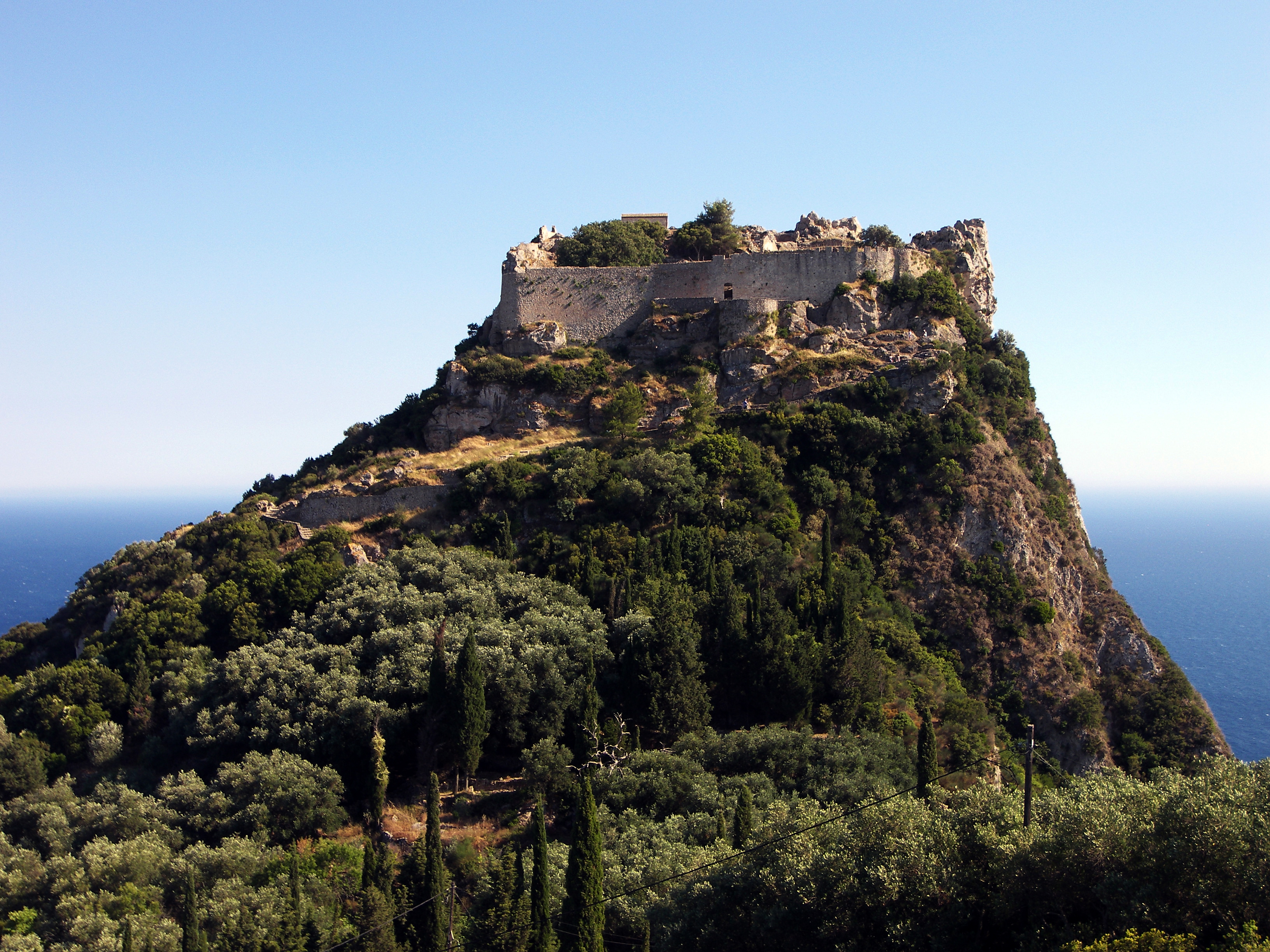
The castle of Angelokastro in Corfu, whose construction is sometimes attributed to Michael

Michael himself did not long outlive these successes: in late 1214 or in 1215, he was assassinated in his sleep while in Berat by a servant called Rhomaios. According to the historian John V. A Fine, "whether he was hired to do the act, and, if so, by whom is unknown". As his only surviving son was illegitimate and underage, Michael was succeeded by his half-brother Theodore. Theodore had been in the service of Nicaea, and Michael had requested Laskaris to send him to Epirus because his own son's position was weak. In the event, Theodore not only sidelined the young Michael II, but according to the hagiography of St. Theodora of Arta, sent him and his mother to exile in the Peloponnese for the duration of his reign. Theodore proved a powerful and warlike ruler, greatly expanding the Epirote state and capturing Thessalonica in 1224, where he was crowned emperor. The rise of Theodore's Empire of Thessalonica ended abruptly with his defeat and capture by the Bulgarians at the Battle of Klokotnitsa in 1230, that allowed the exiled Michael II to return to Epirus and recover his father's domain.

Michael laid the foundations of the Epirote state, and initiated a dynasty, the Komnenoi–Doukai, who would rule over Epirus until 1318, when the Italian Orsini family took over. Members of the family also ruled over Thessaly, and for a while claimed the imperial title as rulers of Thessalonica from 1224 until its capture by the Nicaeans in 1246. It appears that during his lifetime, Michael was a popular ruler with his subjects; the contemporary metropolitan bishop of Naupactus, John Apokaukos, lauded Michael as a "new Noah", at whose side the refugees of the Latin cataclysm found refuge. The contemporary Archbishop of Ohrid Demetrios Chomatianos even estimated that at least half, if not most, of those who fled from Constantinople, found refuge in Epirus, including many of the senatorial aristocracy. More still came from the Peloponnese, fleeing Latin rule there. Apokaukos also praises him for his refoundation and refortification of the city of Ioannina, where many of the refugees were settled; the city thenceforth chose the Archangel Michael as its patron saint in his honour.

== Family ==
The exact identity of Michael's wife or wives is unknown. According to the hagiography of St. Theodora of Arta, he married twice. His first wife was a lady of the aristocratic Melissenos family, who died at an unknown time. Her first cousin, likewise a Melissenos, married the governor of Nicopolis, Senachereim (see above). After his murder by the locals, Michael avenged him, took his place and married his widow. Despite the unreliability of the hagiography, its account is partially confirmed by Villehardouin's reference to the daughter of an Epirote magnate. Furthermore, as Michael's second wife was a first cousin of his first, their marriage was uncanonical in the eyes of the Church and of hostile historians; it is therefore likely that the "concubine" referenced by the latter as the mother of Michael II Komnenos Doukas was in reality Michael's second wife.

Michael had five children, three by his (first) wife and two by his second wife or concubine:

- An unnamed daughter, who in 1209 married Eustace, brother of the Latin Emperor Henry of Flanders.
- Theodora Komnene Doukaina, only mentioned briefly by Demetrios Chomatianos in 1216.
- Constantine Komnenos Doukas, mentioned only in the Latin text of the 1210 treaty with Venice, where he is designated as his father's successor. He must have died at a young age, before Michael's own death.
- Maria Komnene Doukaina, who married Constantine Maliasenos.
- Michael II Komnenos Doukas, an illegitimate son who succeeded as ruler of Epirus in 1230 until his death ca. 1268. He is the first Epirote ruler to have borne the title of despotes.

== Sources ==
- Fine, John V. A. (1994) [1987]. The Late Medieval Balkans: A Critical Survey from the Late Twelfth Century to the Ottoman Conquest. Ann Arbor, Michigan: University of Michigan Press. ISBN 978-0-472-10079-8.
- Loenertz, Raymond-Joseph (1973). "Aux origines du despotat d'Épire et de la principauté d'Achaïe" [On the origins of the Despotate of Epirus and the Principality of Achaea]. Byzantion (in French). 43: 360–394.
- Nicol, Donald MacGillivray (1976). "Refugees, Mixed Population and Local Patriotism in Epiros and Western Macedonia after the Fourth Crusade". XVe Congrès international d'études byzantines (Athènes, 1976), Rapports et corapports I. Athens. pp. 3–33.
- Nicol, Donald M. (1984). The Despotate of Epiros, 1267–1479: A Contribution to the History of Greece in the Middle Ages. Cambridge: Cambridge University Press. ISBN 978-0-521-13089-9.
- Polemis, Demetrios I. (1968). The Doukai: A Contribution to Byzantine Prosopography. London: The Athlone Press.
- Stiernon, Lucien (1959). "Les origines du despotat d'Épire. À propos d'un livre récent" [The origins of the Despotate of Epirus. On the occasion of a recent book]. Revue des études byzantines (in French). 17: 90–126. doi:10.3406/rebyz.1959.1200. ISSN 0766-5598.
- Stiernon, Lucien (1963). "Ferjančić (Božidar), Despoti a Vižantiji i juznoslovenskim Zemljama". Revue des études byzantines (in French). 21: 291–296. ISSN 0766-5598.
- Talbot, Alice-Mary (1991). "Michael I Komnenos Doukas". In Kazhdan, Alexander (ed.). The Oxford Dictionary of Byzantium. Oxford and New York: Oxford University Press. p. 1362. ISBN 0-19-504652-8.
- Talbot, Alice-Mary; Kazhdan, Alexander (1991). "Epiros, Despotate of". In Kazhdan, Alexander (ed.). The Oxford Dictionary of Byzantium. Oxford and New York: Oxford University Press. pp. 716–717. ISBN 0-19-504652-8.
- Van Tricht, Filip (2011). The Latin Renovatio of Byzantium: The Empire of Constantinople (1204–1228). Leiden: Brill. ISBN 978-90-04-20323-5.
- Varzos, Konstantinos (1984). Η Γενεαλογία των Κομνηνών [The Genealogy of the Komnenoi] (PDF) (in Greek). Vol. B. Thessaloniki: Centre for Byzantine Studies, University of Thessaloniki.

Regnal titles
New title Epirote state established following the Fourth Crusade	Ruler of Epirus; 1205 – 1214/15	Succeeded by Theodore Komnenos Doukas
