= Thomas III =

Thomas III may refer to:

- Thomas III of Piedmont (c. 1246–1282)
- Thomas III d'Autremencourt, Lord of Salona (r. 1294–1311)
- Thomas III of Saluzzo (1356–1416)
