= Galaxidiotika =

Galaxidiotika (Greek: Γαλαξιδιώτικα) was an old neighbourhood in the city of Patras. Many residents came from Galaxidi, a town in Phocis in Central Greece, hence the origin of its name.

== Note ==
- The first version of the article is translated from the article at the Greek Wikipedia (el:Main Page)
