= Mikhaēl I =

Mikhaēl I may refer to:

- Michael I Rhangabes, Byzantine Emperor (ruled 811–813)
- Michael I Cerularius (c. 1000–1059), Patriarch of Constantinople
- Michael I Komnenos Doukas (died in 1215)
