= Thomas I =

Thomas I may refer to:

- Thomas I of Constantinople, Patriarch from 607 to 610
- Thomas I of Jerusalem, Patriarch until 821
- Thomas I of York (died in 1100)
- Thomas I, Count of Savoy (1178–1233)
- Thomas I d'Autremencourt (died ca. 1212), Lord of Salona
- Thomas I of Esztergom (1224)
- Thomas I of Saluzzo (died in 1296)
- Thomas I Komnenos Doukas (c. 1285–1318)
- Baselios Thomas I (1929– )
