= Demitre =

Albanian count

Demitre was an Albanian count in the Catalan dominions in late-14th-century Thessaly, during the Frankokratia.

Mentioned as de Mitre and lo comte Mitra (a corruption of Dimitri/Demetrius) in contemporary sources, he was an Albanian chieftain based in southeastern Thessaly (Albanians had migrated to Thessaly from about 1320). He could rally 1,500 cavalrymen and was entitled to bear the royal banner of Aragon as a born vassal of Peter IV. Among the eighteen Catalan vassals of the area in 1380-1 he ranks second below the Count of Salona and above the Margrave of Bodonitsa. In a document of April 1381, he is listed among those greeted by Peter IV for their services against the Navarrese Company in 1379.
