= Thomas I d'Autremencourt =

Thomas I d'Autremencourt, commonly misspelled de Stromoncourt, was the first Lord of Salona (modern Amfissa) in Central Greece. A knight from Autremencourt in Picardy, he was given Salona as a fief by Boniface of Montferrat, King of Thessalonica, in 1205 during the division of the Byzantine Empire after the Fourth Crusade. Thomas extended his domain over most of Phocis, from the Gulf of Corinth to the passes of Gravia in the north and the Parnassus in the east. Ca. 1210, he tried to extend his rule westwards, and attacked the port town of Galaxidi. Its inhabitants, however, called upon the ruler of Epirus, Michael I Komnenos Doukas, for aid. The Epirote army attacked and captured Salona, with Thomas himself falling in battle (ca. 1212). As the Epirote ruler was pre-occupied elsewhere, however, his occupation did not last long, and within a few years Thomas's son, Thomas II, was able to reclaim Salona.

== Sources ==
- Liddell, Robert (1965). Mainland Greece. Longmans. pp. 64–65.
- Longnon, Jean (1937). "Les Autremencourt, seigneurs de Salona en Grèce (1204-1311)". Bulletin de la Société historique de Haute-Picardie (in French). 15: 15–48.
- Longnon, Jean (1949). L'empire latin de Constantinople et la principauté de Morée (in French). Paris: Payot. pp. 76, 120.

New title	Lord of Salona; 1205 – ca. 1212	Vacant Epirote occupation Title next held by Thomas II
