= William d'Autremencourt =

William d'Autremencourt (died 1294) was a Lord of Salona from 1258 to 1294.

== Ancestry ==
He was a son of Thomas II d'Autremencourt, Lord of Salona, and wife a niece of William II of Villehardouin.

== Marriage and issue ==
The name of William's wife is not known. William and his wife had two children:

- Agnes, married with Dreux de Beaumont, marshal of Charles I of Naples.
- Thomas, his successor as Lord of Salona.

== Sources ==
- Longnon, Jean (1937). "Les Autremencourt, seigneurs de Salona en Grèce (1204-1311)". Bulletin de la Société historique de Haute-Picardie (in French). 15: 15–48.
- Miller, William (1908). The Latins in the Levant: A History of Frankish Greece (1204–1566). London: John Murray. OCLC 563022439.

Preceded by Thomas II	Lord of Salona; 1258–1294	Succeeded by Thomas III
