= La Neuville-Bosmont =

- Commune
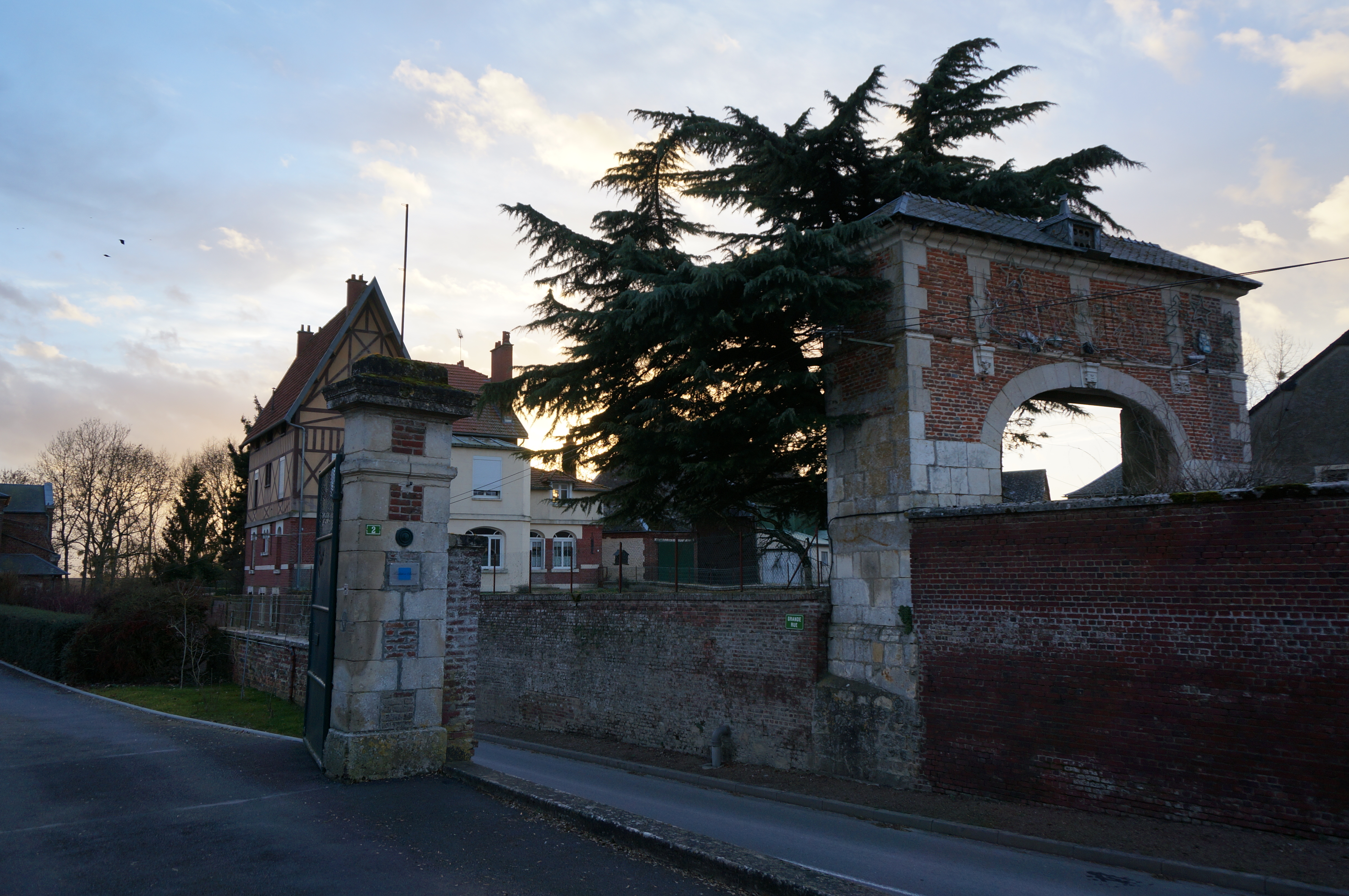
- The chateau of Bosmont
- Location of La Neuville-Bosmont
- Location within France Location within Hauts-de-France
- Coordinates: 49°42′49″N 3°50′25″E
- Country: France
- Region: Hauts-de-France
- Department: Aisne
- Arrondissement: Laon
- Canton: Marle
- Intercommunality: Pays de la Serre

Government
  - Mayor (2026–32): Bruno Lebeau
- Area^{1}: 9.98 km^{2} (3.85 sq mi)
- Elevation: 140 m (460 ft)
- Highest elevation: 141 m (463 ft)
- Lowest elevation: 82 m (269 ft)
- Population (2023): 187
  - Density: 18.7/km^{2} (48.5/sq mi)
- Time zone: UTC+01:00 (CET)
  - Summer (DST): UTC+02:00 (CEST)
- INSEE/Postal code: 02545 /02250
- ^{1} French Land Register data, which excludes lakes, ponds, glaciers > 1 km^{2} (0.386 sq mi or 247 acres) and river estuaries.

La Neuville-Bosmont is a commune in the Aisne department in Hauts-de-France in northern France.

== Population ==
Historical population
Year	Pop.	±% p.a.
1968	239	—
1975	190	−3.22%
1982	158	−2.60%
1990	169	+0.84%
1999	196	+1.66%
2007	184	−0.79%
2012	194	+1.06%
2017	187	−0.73%
2023	187	+0.00%
Source: INSEE

== See also ==
- Communes of the Aisne department
