= Thomas III d'Autremencourt =

Lord of Salona

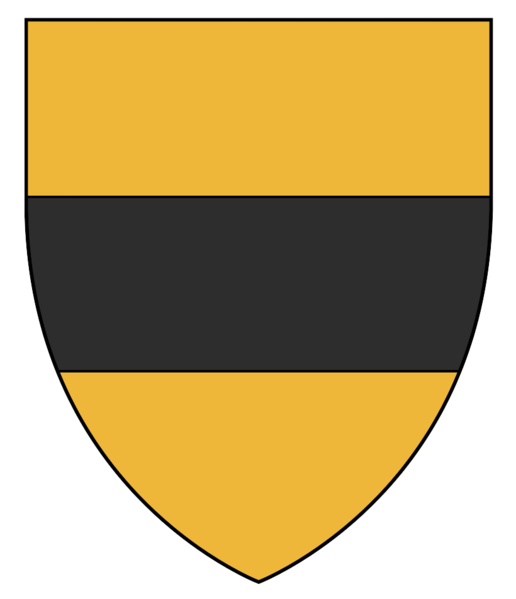
- Arms of d'Autremencourt
- Died: 15 March 1311
- Occupations: Lord of Salona, Marshal of the Principality of Achaea
- Years active: 1294–1311
- Term: 1294–1311 (Lord of Salona)
- Predecessor: William
- Successor: Roger Deslaur

Thomas III d'Autremencourt or de Stromoncourt (died 15 March 1311) was the fourth Lord of Salona (modern Amfissa) in Central Greece, and the last of his family. He ruled his domain from 1294 until his death in the Battle of the Cephissus against the Catalan Company in 1311. At the same time, he also held the position of marshal of the Principality of Achaea. After his death, his widow and domain passed to Roger Deslaur, who in the aftermath of Cephissus was for a brief time (1311–1312) selected as the leader of the Catalan Company.

== Life ==
He was the son of William d'Autremencourt and an unknown woman. He also had a sister, Agnes, who married Dreux de Beaumont marshal of Charles I of Naples.

Autremoncourts paternal grandmother was a de Villehardouin and niece of William de Villehardouin.

== Sources ==
- Longnon, Jean (1937). "Les Autremencourt, seigneurs de Salona en Grèce (1204-1311)". Bulletin de la Société historique de Haute-Picardie (in French). 15: 15–48.
- Setton, Kenneth M. (1975). "The Catalans in Greece, 1311–1388". In Hazard, Harry W. (ed.). A History of the Crusades, Volume III: The fourteenth and fifteenth centuries. Madison, Wisconsin: University of Wisconsin Press. pp. 167–224. ISBN 0-299-06670-3.

Preceded by William	Lord of Salona; 1294–1311	Succeeded by Roger Deslaur
