= Cuirieux =

- Commune
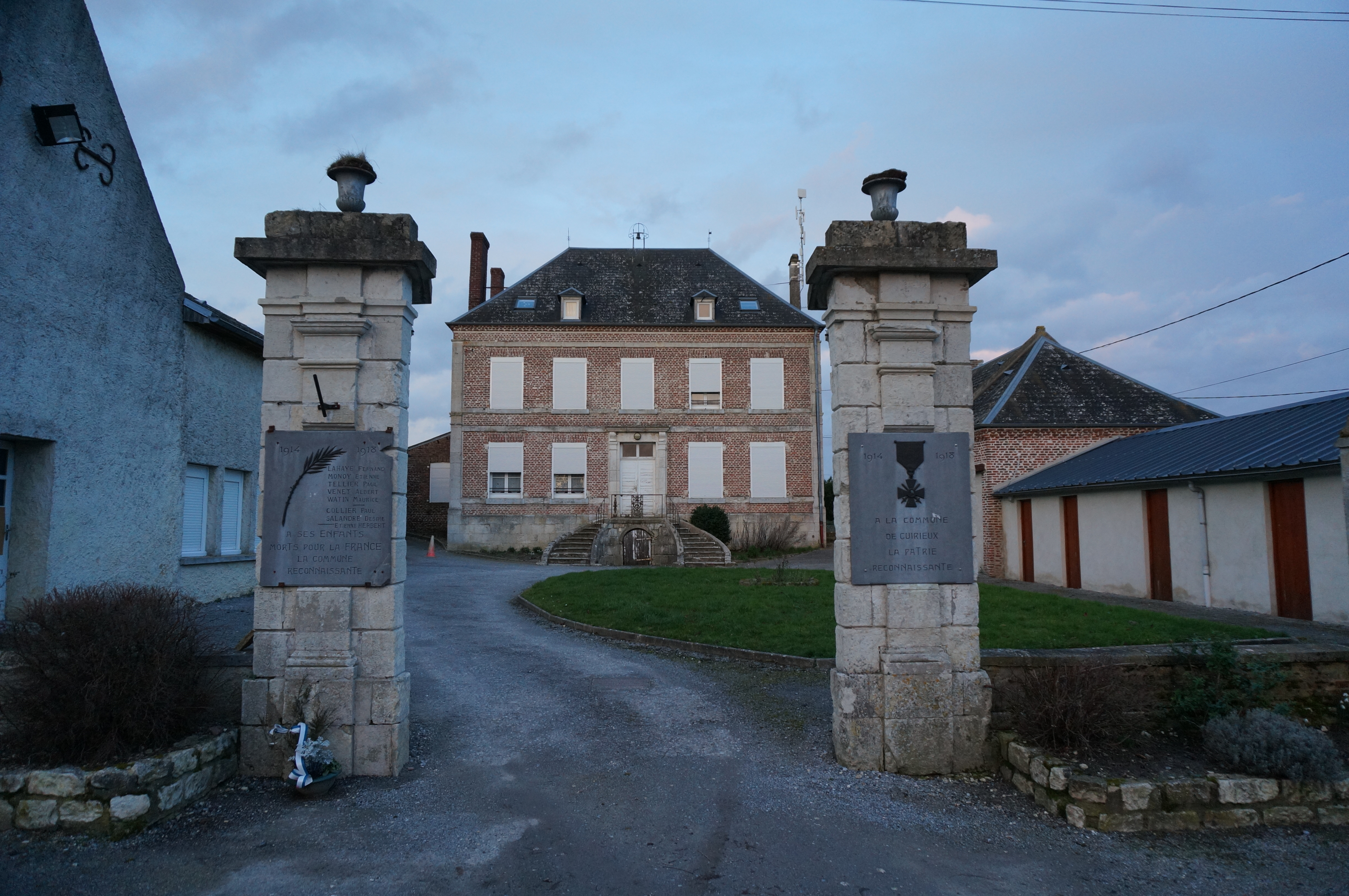
- The town hall and war memorials of Cuirieux
- Location of Cuirieux
- Location within France Location within Hauts-de-France
- Coordinates: 49°40′54″N 3°48′56″E
- Country: France
- Region: Hauts-de-France
- Department: Aisne
- Arrondissement: Laon
- Canton: Marle
- Intercommunality: Pays de la Serre

Government
  - Mayor (2026–32): Franck Felzinger
- Area^{1}: 6.46 km^{2} (2.49 sq mi)
- Elevation: 83 m (272 ft)
- Highest elevation: 121 m (397 ft)
- Lowest elevation: 74 m (243 ft)
- Population (2023): 152
  - Density: 23.5/km^{2} (60.9/sq mi)
- Time zone: UTC+01:00 (CET)
  - Summer (DST): UTC+02:00 (CEST)
- INSEE/Postal code: 02248 /02350
- ^{1} French Land Register data, which excludes lakes, ponds, glaciers > 1 km^{2} (0.386 sq mi or 247 acres) and river estuaries.

Cuirieux (French pronunciation: [kɥiʁjø]) is a commune in the Aisne department in Hauts-de-France in northern France.

== Population ==
Historical population
Year	Pop.	±% p.a.
1968	147	—
1975	119	−2.97%
1982	131	+1.38%
1990	142	+1.01%
1999	143	+0.08%
2007	161	+1.49%
2012	161	+0.00%
2017	157	−0.50%
2023	152	−0.54%
Source: INSEE

== See also ==
- Communes of the Aisne department
