= Chronicle of Galaxeidi =

1703 Greek chronicle

The Chronicle of Galaxeidi (Greek: Χρονικό του Γαλαξειδίου) is a Greek chronicle written in the year 1703 detailing the history of the town of Galaxeidi on the northern shore of the Gulf of Corinth and its wider region, including the towns of Naupaktos, Amfissa, and Loidoriki, from the Middle Ages to 1690. It was written by the monk Euthymios in the vernacular language using original sources found in the Monastery of Christ the Saviour. Discovered in 1864, it was published by the Greek scholar Konstantinos Sathas in 1865.

== Editions ==
- Χρονικόν ανέκδοτον Γαλαξειδίου: ή Ιστορία Αμφίσσης, Ναυπάκτου, Γαλαξειδίου, Λοιδορικείου και των περιχώρων από των αρχαιοτάτων μέχρι των καθ' ημάς χρόνων μετά προλεγομένων και άλλων ιστορικών σημειώσεων εν ω προσήρτηται πραγματεία και πίναξ ανεκδότων νομισμάτων του μεσαίωνος / νυν πρώτον εκδίδοντος Κωνσταντίνου Ν. Σάθα Athens 1865
