= Thomas II d'Autremencourt =

Thomas II d'Autremencourt, commonly misspelled de Stromoncourt, was the second Lord of Salona (modern Amfissa) in Central Greece from 1215 to 1258 and vassal of the Principality of Achaea. He was the son of Thomas I d'Autremencourt, the first Lord of Salona. In 1215 he reconquered Salona from the Despotate of Epirus and recovered the fief of his father. In 1258, he became involved in the War of the Euboeote Succession, siding with Guy de la Roche and the Frankish lords who opposed the hegemonic ambitions of the Prince of Achaea, William II of Villehardouin. William however prevailed in the Battle of Karydi in 1258, and a parliament was assembled at Nikli to judge the defeated lords, and again expressed his loyalty to the prince of Achaea. Thomas died in the same year and was succeeded by his son William.

== Marriage and children ==
He married a niece of William II of Villehardouin whose name does not survive and had one son and one daughter:

- William. Succeeded his father as Lord of Salona.
- Daughter, whose name and fate are not known.

Vacant Epirote occupation Title last held by Thomas I	Lord of Salona; 1215–1258	Succeeded by William
