= Pierrepont, Aisne =

Pierrepont
- Commune
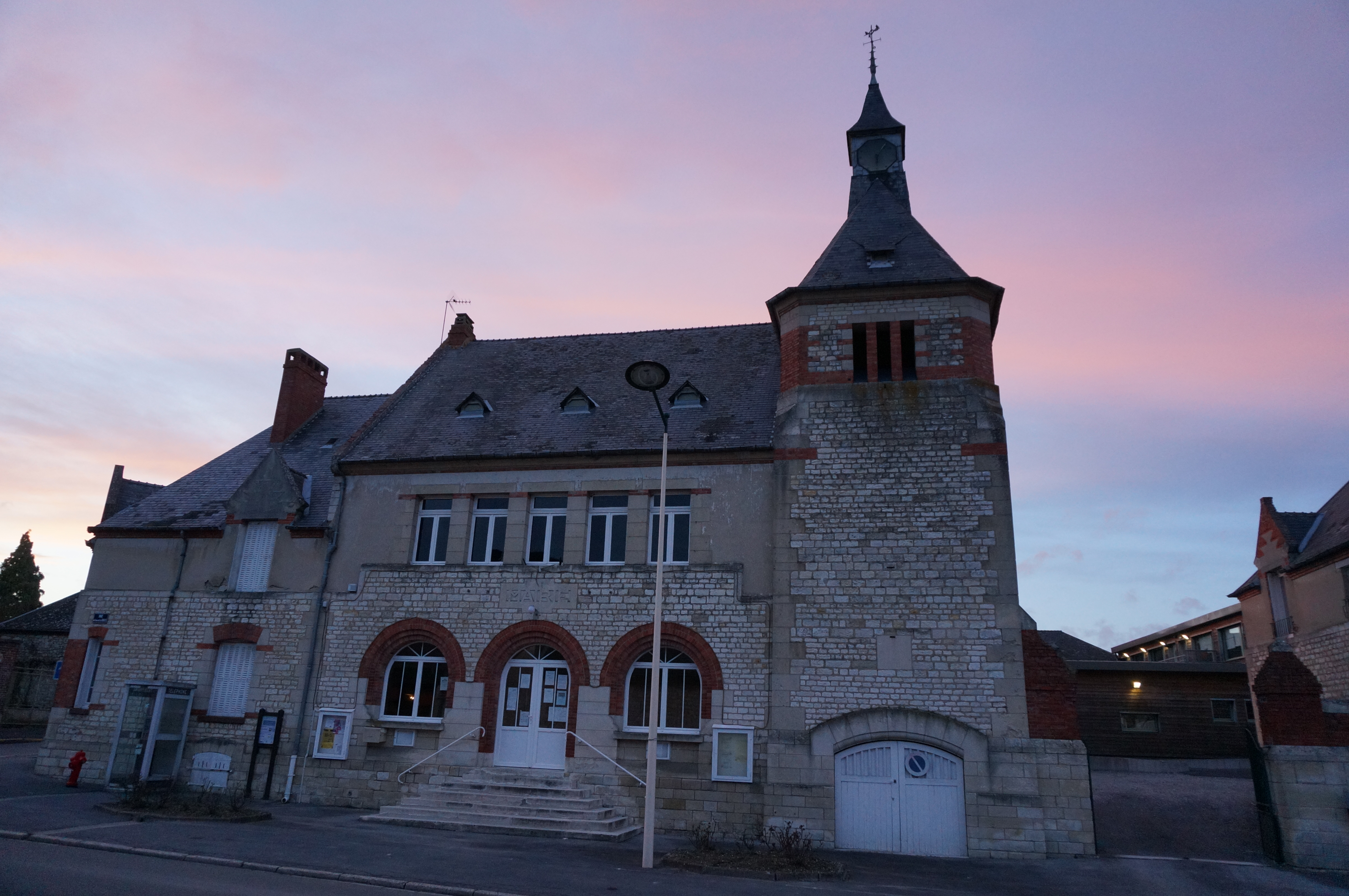
- The town hall of Pierrepont
- Location of Pierrepont
- Location within France Location within Hauts-de-France
- Coordinates: 49°39′15″N 3°47′33″E
- Country: France
- Region: Hauts-de-France
- Department: Aisne
- Arrondissement: Laon
- Canton: Marle
- Intercommunality: Pays de la Serre

Government
  - Mayor (2026–32): Cédric Méreau
- Area^{1}: 10.54 km^{2} (4.07 sq mi)
- Elevation: 70 m (230 ft)
- Highest elevation: 94 m (308 ft)
- Lowest elevation: 67 m (220 ft)
- Population (2023): 341
  - Density: 32.4/km^{2} (83.8/sq mi)
- Time zone: UTC+01:00 (CET)
  - Summer (DST): UTC+02:00 (CEST)
- INSEE/Postal code: 02600 /02350
- ^{1} French Land Register data, which excludes lakes, ponds, glaciers > 1 km^{2} (0.386 sq mi or 247 acres) and river estuaries.

Pierrepont (French pronunciation: [pjɛʁpɔ̃]) is a commune in the Aisne department in Hauts-de-France in northern France.

== Population ==
Historical population
Year	Pop.	±% p.a.
1968	361	—
1975	368	+0.27%
1982	370	+0.08%
1990	394	+0.79%
1999	379	−0.43%
2007	394	+0.49%
2012	399	+0.25%
2017	370	−1.50%
2023	341	−1.35%
Source: INSEE

== See also ==
- List of medieval bridges in France
- Communes of the Aisne department
