= Toulis-et-Attencourt =

- Commune
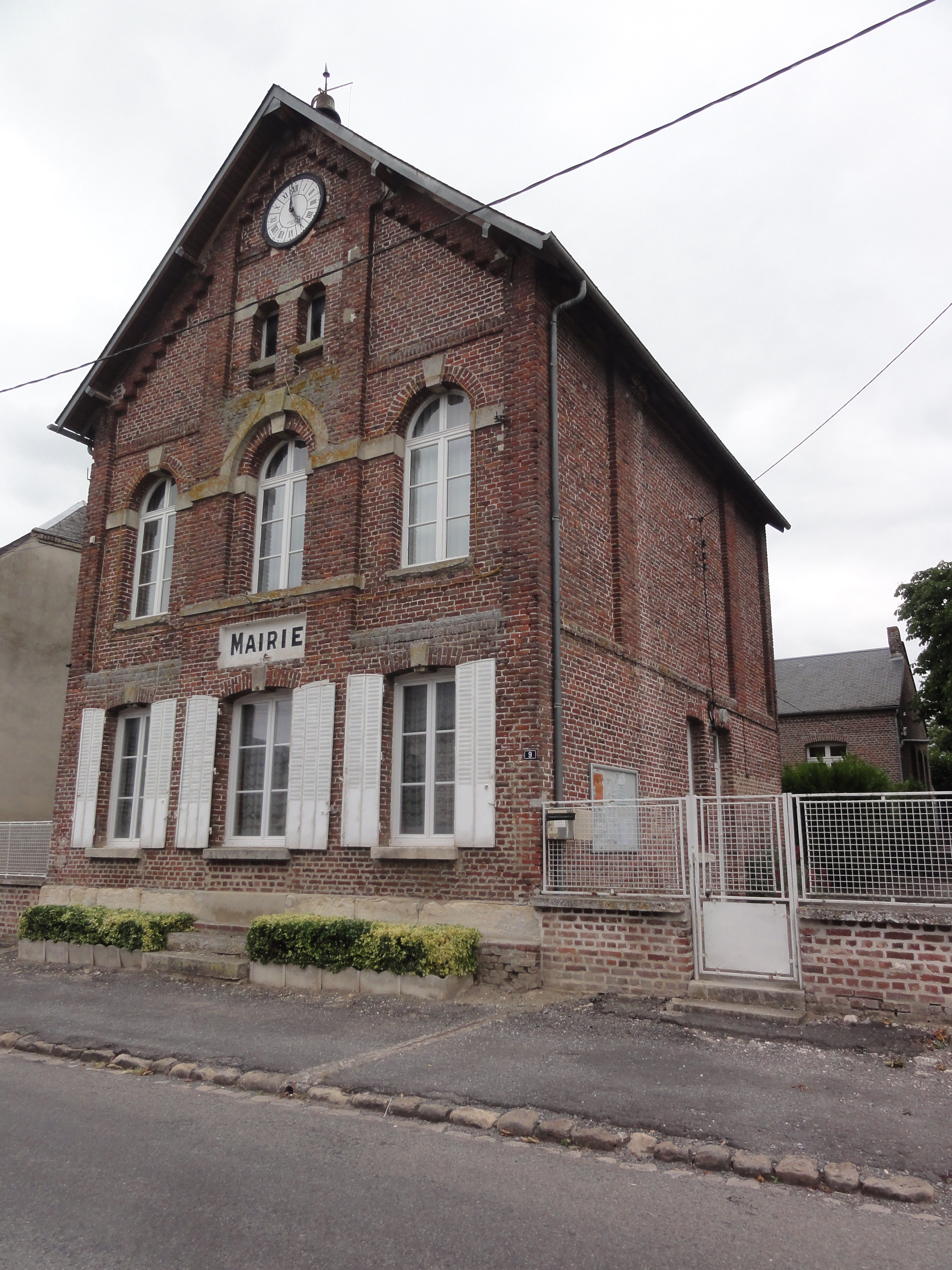
- The town hall of Toulis-et-Attencourt
- Location of Toulis-et-Attencourt
- Location within France Location within Hauts-de-France
- Coordinates: 49°42′02″N 3°44′38″E
- Country: France
- Region: Hauts-de-France
- Department: Aisne
- Arrondissement: Laon
- Canton: Marle
- Intercommunality: Pays de la Serre

Government
  - Mayor (2026–32): Hubert Duflot
- Area^{1}: 7.42 km^{2} (2.86 sq mi)
- Elevation: 90 m (300 ft)
- Highest elevation: 109 m (358 ft)
- Lowest elevation: 66 m (217 ft)
- Population (2023): 110
  - Density: 15/km^{2} (38/sq mi)
- Time zone: UTC+01:00 (CET)
  - Summer (DST): UTC+02:00 (CEST)
- INSEE/Postal code: 02745 /02250
- ^{1} French Land Register data, which excludes lakes, ponds, glaciers > 1 km^{2} (0.386 sq mi or 247 acres) and river estuaries.

Toulis-et-Attencourt is a commune in the Aisne department in Hauts-de-France in northern France.

== Population ==
Historical population
Year	Pop.	±% p.a.
1968	215	—
1975	154	−4.66%
1982	151	−0.28%
1990	137	−1.21%
1999	115	−1.93%
2007	127	+1.25%
2012	135	+1.23%
2017	128	−1.06%
2023	110	−2.49%
Source: INSEE

== See also ==
- Communes of the Aisne department
