= Montigny-sous-Marle =

- Commune
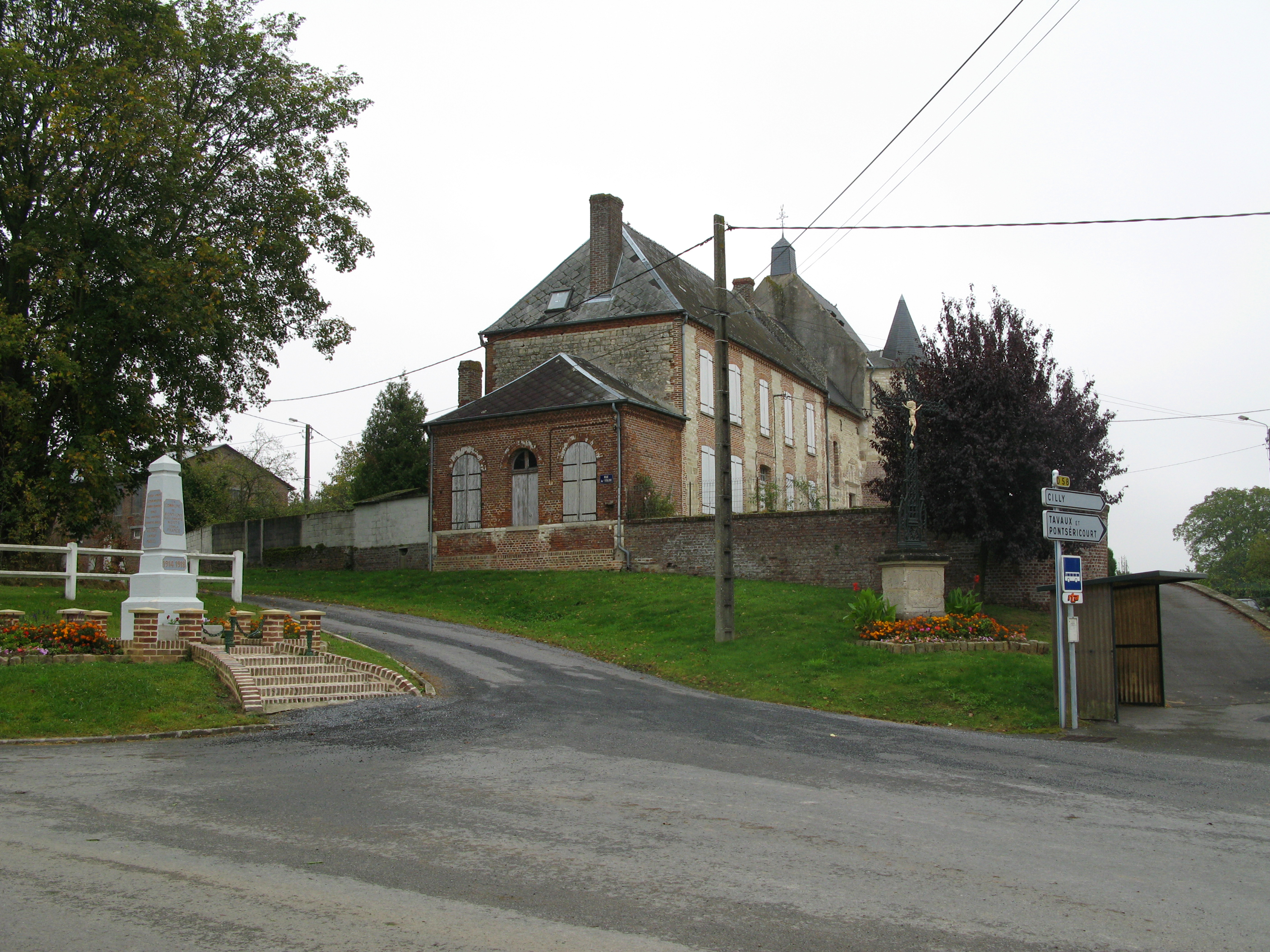
- The street skirts the hill where the church stands with its cemetery
- Location of Montigny-sous-Marle
- Location within France Location within Hauts-de-France
- Coordinates: 49°44′57″N 3°47′35″E
- Country: France
- Region: Hauts-de-France
- Department: Aisne
- Arrondissement: Laon
- Canton: Marle
- Intercommunality: Pays de la Serre

Government
  - Mayor (2026–32): Francis Legoux
- Area^{1}: 7.33 km^{2} (2.83 sq mi)
- Highest elevation: 157 m (515 ft)
- Lowest elevation: 77 m (253 ft)
- Population (2023): 71
  - Density: 9.7/km^{2} (25/sq mi)
- Time zone: UTC+01:00 (CET)
  - Summer (DST): UTC+02:00 (CEST)
- INSEE/Postal code: 02516 /02250
- ^{1} French Land Register data, which excludes lakes, ponds, glaciers > 1 km^{2} (0.386 sq mi or 247 acres) and river estuaries.

Montigny-sous-Marle (French pronunciation: [mɔ̃tiɲi su maʁl], literally Montigny under Marle) is a commune in the Aisne department in Hauts-de-France in northern France.

== Population ==
Historical population
Year	Pop.	±% p.a.
1968	135	—
1975	102	−3.93%
1982	99	−0.43%
1990	77	−3.09%
1999	62	−2.38%
2007	70	+1.53%
2012	66	−1.17%
2017	63	−0.93%
2023	71	+2.01%
Source: INSEE

== See also ==
- Communes of the Aisne department
