= Lordship of Salona =

Crusader state in central Greece

- Vassal lordship (after 1318 County) of the Duchy of Athens
- 1205–1210; 1212–1394; 1404–1410
- The Byzantine Empire and the Latin states in southern Greece c. 1278
- Capital: Salona (La Sole)
- Government
  - Type: Feudal principality
- Lord (after 1318, Count)
  - 1205–1210: Thomas I d'Autremencourt (first Lord)
  - 1318–1338: Alfonso Fadrique (first Count)
- Historical era: Middle Ages
  - Frankish conquest: 1205
  - Ottoman conquest: 1410
| Preceded by | Succeeded by |
| Byzantine Empire | Ottoman Empire |
- Today part of: Greece

The Lordship of Salona, after 1318 the County of Salona, was a Crusader state established after the Fourth Crusade (1204) in Central Greece, around the town of Salona (modern Amfissa, known in French as La Sole and Italian as La Sola).

== History ==
The first lord of Salona, Thomas I d'Autremencourt (or de Stromoncourt), was named by Boniface of Montferrat, the King of Thessalonica, in 1205. After the fall of the Thessalonica to the forces of Epirus, and a short-lived Epirote occupation in c. 1210–1212, Salona became a vassal of the Principality of Achaea, but later came under increasing dependency from the Duchy of Athens. In 1318, the lordship came under the rule of the Catalan Fadrique family, the leader of the Catalan Company, who claimed the title of Count of Salona. Among the eighteen Catalan vassals of the area in 1380-1 the Count of Salona ranks first above Count Demitre and the Margrave of Bodonitsa. Due to the unpopularity of the Dowager Countess Helena Asanina Kantakouzene, in 1394, the town opened its gates to the Ottoman sultan Bayezid I. It fell for a short time into the hands of the Despotate of the Morea c. 1402. The Despot Theodore I Palaiologos sold Salona to the Knights Hospitaller in 1404, but it fell again to the Ottomans in 1410.

== Rulers ==
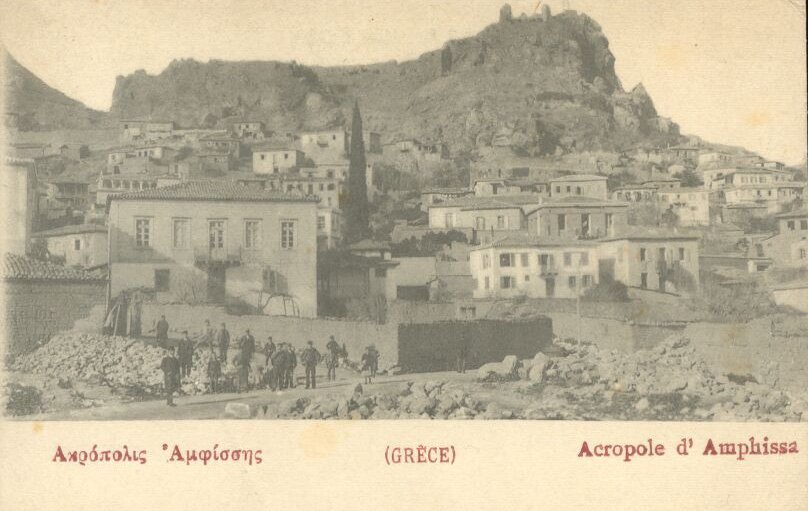
The citadel of Amfissa, built by the Latin rulers of the town, from a 1918 postcard

d'Autremencourt/de Stromoncourt family

- Thomas I d'Autremencourt (r. 1205–1210)
- Thomas II d'Autremencourt (r. 1212–1258), son of Thomas I
- William d'Autremencourt (r. 1258–1294), son of Thomas II
- Thomas III d'Autremencourt (r. 1294–1311), son of William, killed at the Battle of the Cephissus

Catalan Conquest

- Roger Deslaur (r. 1311–1318)
- Alfonso Fadrique (r. 1318–1338)
- Peter Fadrique (r. 1338–1350/55), eldest son of Alfonso
- James Fadrique (r. c. 1355–1366), second son of Alfonso
- Boniface Fadrique (r. 1366–c. 1375), brother of James
- Louis Fadrique (r. c. 1375–1380/81), son of James

Navarrese Conquest (1380)

- Maria Fadrique (r. 1382–1394), daughter of Louis, under the regency of her mother, Helena Asanina Kantakouzene

First Ottoman conquest (1394 – c. 1402)
Byzantine Moreot conquest (1402–1404)
Knights Hospitaller (1404–1410)
Second Ottoman conquest (1410)

== See also ==
- Latin Bishopric of Salona

== Sources ==
- Fine, John V. A. (1994) [1987]. The Late Medieval Balkans: A Critical Survey from the Late Twelfth Century to the Ottoman Conquest. Ann Arbor, Michigan: University of Michigan Press. ISBN 978-0-472-10079-8.
- Longnon, Jean (1937). "Les Autremencourt, seigneurs de Salona en Grèce (1204-1311)". Bulletin de la Société historique de Haute-Picardie (in French). 15: 15–48.
- Miller, William (1908). The Latins in the Levant: A History of Frankish Greece (1204–1566). London: John Murray.
- "County of Salona". Latin Occupation in the Greek Lands. Foundation of the Hellenic World.
