= John of Enghien (died 1373) =

One of John's seals. Four different types are known.

John of Enghien (French: Jean or Jehans d'Enghien; died 1373) was the count of Lecce from 1356 until his death. He was a member of the House of Enghien.

John was the third son of Isabella of Brienne and Walter III of Enghien. He was born before 1327. His uncle, Walter VI of Brienne, entrusted him the government of his lands in the Kingdom of Cyprus—namely, Omorfita, Knodara, Dischoria and a farm at Methokolepsi—but John was an absentee administrator, splitting his time between Enghien and Paris. In 1356, he was serving as a captain in the forces of Prince Robert II of Taranto in Apulia. That year he inherited from his uncle the county of Lecce in the Kingdom of Naples and the Greek lordships of Vonitza and Lefkada.

Although John resided in Lecce, he lacked the wealth and power to maintain the claim to his Greek lands. On 24 August 1359, he complained to the Republic of Venice that one of its citizens, Graziano Giorgio, who was holding Lefkada in fief from him, had attacked Vontiza, damaged its fisheries and imprisoned some of its inhabitants. Venice admonished Giorgio but refused to intervene further. By 1373, Lefkada and Vonitza had been seized by Leonardo Tocco and there is no further reference to the Enghien lordship there.

In 1361, John inherited from his mother the lordship of Castres, Gouy, Novelle, Machaud and Praelle. The last he held in fief from his brother Sohier. On 27 March 1363, Pope Urban V wrote to many Neapolitan nobles, including John, asking them to give their allegiance and support to Queen Joan I's new husband, James IV of Majorca.

In March 1364, Duke Albert I of Bavaria executed Sohier without trial. John was urged by both Archbishop Pierre Amielh de Brenac of Naples and his younger brother Engelbert, lord of Ramerupt, to travel north to secure the inheritance of his nephew, Walter IV. He had arrived by June and immediately launched a war of revenge against Albert. This was finally concluded by treaty on 11 April 1367. In June, John wrote to the local Venetian consul about a galley at Venice that he had inherited from his uncle and later sold.

In March 1370, John and his younger brothers Louis and Guy laid claim to the duchy of Athens that had belonged to Sohier. Queen Joan authorized John to transport 1,000 men and 500 horses with her ships to Greece to retake Athens from the Catalan Company. The brothers had less success getting support from Venice at the time. In early 1371, John tried again to get Venetian support, but again was rejected on account of the Venetians truce with the Catalans. The reconquest of Athens never took place.

John was in Apulia in 1372. He died in 1373. He was buried at Lecce in the Basilica of the Holy Cross. He and his wife, Sancia del Balzo (Sanche des Baux), daughter of Bertrand III of the House of Baux, had the following children:

- Engelbert, died young
- Peter, who succeeded him as count of Lecce
- Mary, who succeeded Peter at Lecce and later became queen consort of Naples
- Francesca

== Sources ==
- Briggs, Martin Shaw (1910). In the Heel of Italy: A Study of an Unknown City. London: Andrew Melrose.
- Bury, J. B. (1888). "The Lombards and Venetians in Euboia, A.D. 1340–1470". The Journal of Hellenic Studies. 9: 91–117. doi:10.2307/623661.
- Goffin, René (1965). Généalogies enghiennoises, Livre I: La Maison d'Enghien. Tablettes du Hainaut, III. Grandmetz: Claude-René Paternostre de la Mairieu.
- Luttrell, Anthony (1966). "The Latins of Argos and Nauplia: 1311–1394". Papers of the British School at Rome. 34. British School at Rome: 34–55. doi:10.1017/S0068246200007455. JSTOR 40310660. S2CID 179112752.
- Nicol, Donald M. (1984) [1957]. The Despotate of Epiros 1267–1479: A Contribution to the History of Greece in the Middle Ages (2nd expanded ed.). Cambridge University Press. ISBN 9780521261906.
- Setton, Kenneth M. (1953). "Archbishop Pierre d'Ameil in Naples and the Affair of Aimon III of Geneva (1363–1364)". Speculum. 28 (4): 643–691.

| Preceded by Walter III | Count of Lecce; 1356–1373 | Succeeded by Peter |
