= Walter of Brienne =

Walter, Gautier, or Gauthier of Brienne may refer to:

- Walter I of Brienne (c. 1090)
- Walter II of Brienne (1120-1161)
- Walter III of Brienne (d. 1205)
- Walter IV of Brienne (1205-1244)
- Walter V of Brienne (1275-1311)
- Walter VI of Brienne (1304-1356)
- Walter VII of Brienne (d. 1381), better known as Walter IV of Enghien

== See also ==
- County of Brienne
