= Isabella, Countess of Brienne =

Countess of Brienne and Lecce

- Born: 1306
- Died: 1360 (aged 53–54)
- Noble family: House of Brienne
- Spouse: Walter III of Enghien
- Issue: Sohier of Enghien; Louis of Enghien; Guy of Enghien
- Father: Walter V of Brienne
- Mother: Joanna of Châtillon

Isabella of Brienne (1306–1360) was suo jure Countess of Lecce and Conversano, claimant to the Duchy of Athens and Kingdom of Jerusalem, etc.

== Early life ==
Isabella was daughter of Walter V of Brienne, Duke of Athens, (Note: killed at the Battle of Halmyros near Thebes, Greece, in 1311) and Joanna of Chatillon. As the granddaughter of Hugh of Brienne, Count of Lecce etc., she was a descendant of the kings of Jerusalem and of Cyprus.

Her father's life was largely spent in Greece, where he tried to win back his mother's inheritance, the Duchy of Athens. Walter V of Brienne hired the Catalan Company, a group of mercenaries founded by Roger de Flor, to fight against the Byzantine successor states of Epirus and Nicaea, but when he tried to cheat and kill them in 1311, they slew him at the Battle of Halmyros and took over the Duchy, making Catalan the official language and replacing the French and Byzantine-derived laws of the Principality of Achaea with the laws of Catalonia, soon making it up as Duchy of Neopatras. When the duke Gauthier was killed, Isabella's mother Jeanne de Châtillon (died 1354), daughter of count of Porcien, may have tried to hold the Acropolis of Athens against the attacking Catalans, but eventually surrendered it.

The Brienne family retainers continued to hold the Lordship of Argos and Nauplia under Walter of Foucherolles. Duchess Joanna however fled with her two young children to France, where the family had properties in Champagne, around Brienne-le-Chateau. The impoverished family was not able to provide better, and Isabella married Walter III of Enghien, whose lordships in and around the Hainaut were not unsubstantial (Condé, Enghien).

== Countess of Lecce and Brienne ==
Her brother Walter VI of Brienne gradually gained better positions, and by allying with the Angevin kings of Naples, recovered some Italian fiefs. As constable of France, he was killed in the battle of Poitiers in 1356. He had also been Lord of Florence, Marshal of France, Count of Lecce, Conversano etc. He was an ally of the Angevins of Naples, and participated in their policies in Italy. His children died young, both with his first wife Margherita of Anjou-Tarent and his second, his distant kinswoman Jeanne de Brienne. His sister Isabella's children therefore succeeded to his possessions and claims. Already by 1350, Isabella's heir Sohier of Enghien resided in Greece and held Argos and Nauplia.

Isabella survived her brother, whom she succeeded, and died in 1360. Her husband Walter of Enghien had died in 1345.

For a few years, she was Countess of Lecce and Brienne, as well as titular Duchess of Athens and of other claimed titles. Since her eldest son Gauthier had died before her brother, her heir was her second son Sohier of Enghien. She allowed her inherited lands to be divided between her numerous children during her own lifetime.

Isabella's brother Gauthier had left Greece sometime in the 1340s, and her eldest surviving son Sohier of Enghien apparently was resident lord of Argos and Nauplia from c. 1350. In the division of the inheritance in 1356–60, he received the title of Duke of Athens, and certain rights in Argos-Nauplia. However, her sixth son Guy of Enghien received the lordship of Argos and Nauplia in the division and resided there as the lord from 1356 to 1377. Guy was also sometimes titled Duke of Athens, although the title officially belonged to his elder brother and the latter's son, and they as Dukes of Athens were overlords of Guy and Guy's heirs.

Isabella's fourth son Louis of Enghien, Lord of Conversano, received the (titular) Duchy of Athens in 1381, when his nephew's inheritance was divided.

Guy's daughter Maria d'Enghien, Isabella's granddaughter, married Pietro Cornaro, a Venetian. They sold the lordship to Venice in 1388.

Her main inheritance went, after some interludes, to the children of her third son John of Enghien: Peter of Enghien, who died childless, and Mary of Enghien (1367–1446).

== Children ==
Isabella's children were:

1. Walter (June 5, 1322 – November 18, 1340)
2. Isabella (d. December 28, 1357), Abbess of Flines
3. Sohier (d. March 21, 1364), count of Brienne, titular duke of Athens
4. John, (d. 1373), count of Lecce and lord of Castro (father of Mary of Enghien)
5. Margaret, married Pierre de Préaux
6. Louis (d. March 17, 1394), lord (later count) of Conversano, later count of Brienne and titular duke of Athens
7. James, a canon in Liège
8. Guy,(d. 1377), lord of Argos and Nauplia
9. Engelbert (c. 1330–February 20, 1403), lord of Ramerupt, La Follie, and Seneffe
10. Frances, married Peter, Count of Montebello
11. Joan, a nun at Flines

== Sources ==
- Perry, Guy (2018). The Briennes: The Rise and Fall of a Champenois Dynasty in the Age of the Crusades, c.950-1356. Cambridge University Press.

Isabella, Countess of Brienne House of Brienne Born: 1306 Died: 1360
Preceded by Walter VI	Countess of Brienne; 1356–1360	Succeeded by Sohier
Preceded by Walter VI	Countess of Lecce; 1356–1357	Succeeded by John
Preceded by Walter VI	Countess of Conversano; 1356–1357	Succeeded by Louis
