= Scholia =

Type of comment in the manuscript of an ancient author

Scholia (sing.: scholium or scholion, from Ancient Greek: σχόλιον, "comment", "interpretation") are grammatical, critical, or explanatory comments – original or copied from prior commentaries – which are inserted in the margin of the manuscript of ancient authors, as glosses. One who writes scholia is a scholiast. The earliest attested use of the word dates to the 1st century BC.

== History ==
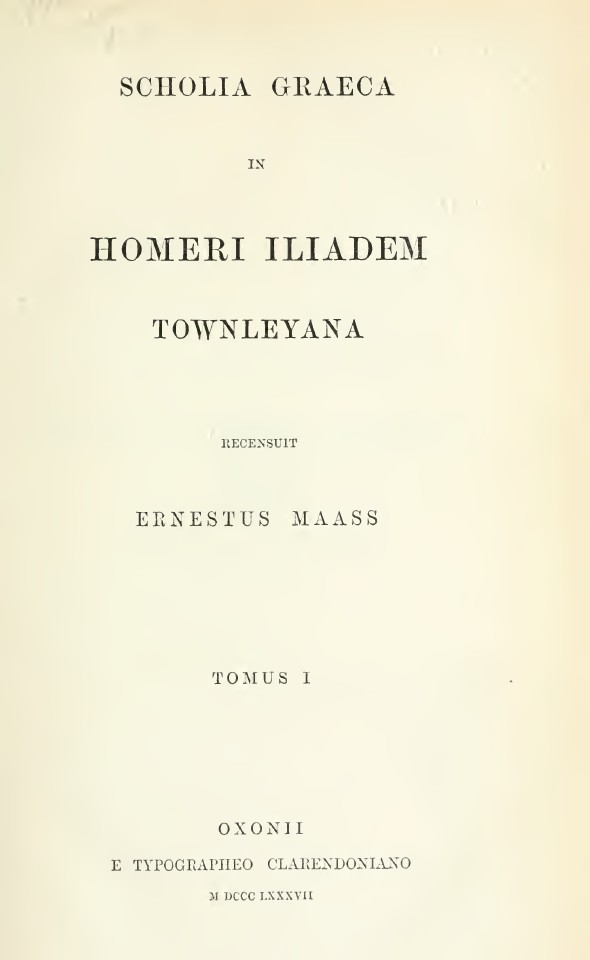
Ernst Maass, Scholia Graeca in Homeri Iliadem Townleyana (1887), a collection of scholia of Homer's Iliad

Ancient scholia are important sources of information about many aspects of the ancient world, especially ancient literary history. The earliest scholia, usually anonymous, date to the 5th or 4th century BC (such as the scholia minora to the Iliad). The practice of compiling scholia continued to late Byzantine times, outstanding examples being Archbishop Eustathius' massive commentaries to Homer in the 12th century and the scholia recentiora of Thomas Magister, Demetrius Triclinius and Manuel Moschopoulos in the 14th.

Scholia were altered by successive copyists and owners of the manuscript, and in some cases, increased to such an extent that there was no longer room for them in the margin, and it became necessary to make them into a separate work. At first, they were taken from one commentary only, and subsequently from several. This is indicated by the repetition of the lemma ("headword"), or by the use of such phrases as "or thus", "alternatively", "according to some", to introduce different explanations, or by the explicit quotation of different sources.

== Important sets of scholia ==
=== Greek ===
The most important are those on the Homeric Iliad, especially those found in the 10th-century manuscripts discovered by Villoison in 1781 in the Biblioteca Marciana in Venice, which are based on Aristarchus and his school. The scholia on Hesiod, Pindar, Sophocles, Aristophanes and Apollonius Rhodius are also extremely important.

=== Latin ===
In Latin, the most important are those of Servius on Virgil; of Acro and Porphyrio on Horace; and of Donatus on Terence. Also of interest are the scholia on Juvenal attached to the good manuscript P; while there are also scholia on Statius, especially associated with the name Lactantius Placidus.

== List of ancient commentaries ==
Some ancient scholia are of sufficient quality and importance to be labelled "commentaries" instead. The existence of a commercial translation is often used to distinguish between "scholia" and "commentaries". The following is a chronological list of ancient commentaries written defined as those for which commercial translations have been made:

- Asconius (c. 55 AD) on Cicero's Pro Scauro, In Pisonem, Pro Milone, Pro Cornelio and In Toga Candida
- Servius (c. 400 AD) on Virgil's Aeneid
- Macrobius (c. 400 AD) on Cicero's Dream of Scipio
- Proclus (c. 440 AD) on Plato's Parmenides and Timaeus and Euclid's Elements
- Boethius (c. 520 AD) on Cicero's Topics

== Other uses ==
- Benedict Spinoza provided his own scholia to many of the propositions in his Ethics, commentaries upon and expansions of the individual propositions, or sometimes short conclusions to sections of argumentation running over a number of propositions.
- In modern mathematics texts, scholia are marginal notes which may amplify a line of reasoning or compare it with proofs given earlier. A famous example is Bayes' scholium, in which he presents a justification for assuming a continuous uniform distribution for the prior of the parameter of a Bernoulli process. Another famous example of a somewhat different use is to be found in Brook Taylor's Methodus Incrementorum, in which the propositions demonstrated are often followed by a scholium which further explains the significance of the proposition.
- Scholia is an academic journal in the field of classical studies.
- Scholia (Wikidata) is a search engine relying on Wikidata, mainly for scientific publications.
- Nicolás Gómez Dávila was one of the most radical critics of modernity whose work consists almost entirely of aphorisms which he called "escolios" ("glosses") of an implicit text.
- In each of Bill Blackbeard's Krazy Kat Sunday strip collections, the back of the book includes an Ignatz Mouse Debaffler Page: a page of notes that clarify references that have faded into obscurity or may otherwise require explanation. When a strip has a scholium about it, the lower outer corner of the page is marked with the likeness of Ignatz.

== See also ==
- The dictionary definition of scholium at Wiktionary
- Marginalia
