= Martin Briggs =

Martin Briggs may refer to:

- Martin Briggs (athlete) (born 1964), British hurdler
- Martin S. Briggs (1882–1977), British architectural historian and author
