= Chandrenos =

14th-century Byzantine general

Chandrenos (Greek: Χανδρηνός; fl. 1305–1310/11) was a Byzantine general who distinguished himself in his successful expeditions against the Catalan Company.

Very little is known about Chandrenos, as his life and deeds are recorded only in an oration to Emperor Andronikos II Palaiologos of his possible relative Thomas Magistros, composed to defend him from accusations of treason sometime in the 1310s. Born to a landowning family in Asia Minor, he fought against the Turks with some success, so that, according to Thomas, even they came to esteem his prowess. Nevertheless, he was unable to stem the tide of the Turkish conquest, and abandoned Asia Minor after his ancestral lands fell. Subsequently, he participated as one of the commanders of the imperial army in the Battle of Apros on 10 July 1305, against the Catalan Company. Chandrenos fought with valour and distinction, but the Byzantines were routed by the Catalans.

In 1308–09, he was sent to Macedonia, where the Catalans had now moved to, under the overall command of the megas stratopedarches Angelos Palaiologos. Here Chandrenos was credited with helping repel the Catalans' attack on Thessalonica, the Byzantine Empire's second-largest city, probably by raiding their siege lines. After the Catalans abandoned the siege of the city in early 1309, his expeditions confined them to their base in Kassandreia, cutting their supplies and putting an end to their devastating raids in the surrounding countryside, which had even threatened the monasteries of Mount Athos. As a result, in spring 1309 the hard-pressed Catalans abandoned Kassandreia and invaded Thessaly, ruled by the weak John II Doukas. The Catalans plundered the region, forcing John II to appeal to the Byzantines for aid. Chandrenos marched south from Thessalonica, and was joined by local volunteers, motivated by appeals and promises of reward by the Byzantine emperor. The Catalans were defeated in minor engagements and driven south out of Thessaly. There they were taken into the employ of the Duchy of Athens, and turning back north conquered much of Thessaly, forcing John II to sue for peace. After the Duke of Athens, Walter of Brienne, tried to dismiss them, however, they attacked the duchy and took it over following their crushing victory over Walter's army in the Battle of Halmyros in 1311.

In the meantime, in 1309 Chandrenos had defeated and driven off a Serbian invasion of Macedonia, assisted by 1,500 Turks who under their leader Malik had deserted the Catalan Company and sought refuge in Serbia. Sometime in the 1310s (probably ca. 1310/11) Chandrenos was in Constantinople, where he was accused by members of the imperial court of treason—probably as a result of jealousy over his military successes—and was defended before the emperor by Thomas Magistros. Nothing further is known of him.

Chandrenos is identified by historian Athanasios Papadopoulos-Kerameus as having married Theodote Glabaina Tarchaneiotissa (a probable daughter of Michael Doukas Glabas Tarchaneiotes and Maria Doukaina Komnene Branaina Palaiologina). Papadopoulos-Kerameus states that they were the parents of Theodora Palaiologina Angelina and thus the maternal grandparents of Emperor John VI Kantakouzenos.

== Sources ==
- Laiou, Angeliki E. (1972). Constantinople and the Latins: The Foreign Policy of Andronicus II, 1282–1328. Harvard University Press. ISBN 0-674-16535-7.
- Nicol, Donald M. (1968). The Byzantine Family of Kantakouzenos (Cantacuzenus), ca. 1100–1460: A Genealogical and Prosopographical Study. Dumbarton Oaks studies 11. Washington, DC: Dumbarton Oaks Center for Byzantine Studies. OCLC 390843.
- Nicol, Donald M. (1993). The Last Centuries of Byzantium, 1261–1453 (Second ed.). London: Rupert Hart-Davis Ltd. ISBN 0-246-10559-3.
- Trapp, Erich; Beyer, Hans-Veit; Kaplaneres, Sokrates; Leontiadis, Ioannis (1994). Prosopographisches Lexikon der Palaiologenzeit (in German). Vol. 12. Vienna: Verlag der Österreichischen Akademie der Wissenschaften. ISBN 3-7001-3003-1.
