= Walter IV =

Walter IV may refer to:

- Walter IV, Count of Brienne (1205–1244)
- Walter IV, Count of Enghien (died in 1381)
