= Joanna of Châtillon =

14th-century French noblewoman and Duchess of Athens

- Born: c.1285
- Died: 16 January 1354 (aged 68–69)
- Buried: former church of the Dominican monastery in Troyes (destroyed)
- Noble family: House of Châtillon
- Spouse: Walter V of Brienne
- Issue: Walter VI of Brienne; Isabella, Countess of Brienne
- Father: Gaucher V de Châtillon
- Mother: Isabelle de Dreux

Joanna of Châtillon or Joan, French: Jeanne; (c. 1285 – 16 January 1354) was the wife of Walter V of Brienne (1305). She was Duchess of Athens by marriage (1308–1311). She was the daughter of Gaucher V de Châtillon, Constable of France and Isabelle de Dreux. Her paternal grandparents were Gaucher IV de Châtillon and Isabelle de Villehardouin. Her maternal grandparents were Robert de Dreux, Viscount of Chateaudun and Isabelle de Villebéon.

== Biography ==
In 1305, Joanna married Walter V of Brienne, the son of Hugh of Brienne, Count of Brienne and Lecce, and Isabella de la Roche. The marriage produced two children:

- Walter VI of Brienne, Count of Brienne, Lecce, and Conversano, titular Duke of Athens (died 19 September 1356), married firstly Margharita of Anjou-Tarent, and secondly, Jeanne de Brienne. His children by both wives died young, so his titles, possessions, and claims were inherited by his sister Isabella.
- Isabella, Countess of Brienne, Countess of Lecce and Conversano, claimant to the Duchy of Athens, and the Kingdom of Jerusalem (1306–1360), married Walter of Enghien, by whom she had eleven children.

On 15 March 1311, Joanna's husband Walter was killed in the Battle of Halmyros against the Catalan Company. Joanna may have tried to hold the Acropolis of Athens against them but eventually surrendered it. She returned with her son Walter VI to France, though her retainers continued to possess Argos and Nauplia under Walter of Foucherolles.

In April 1318, Joanna and her father sent a request to the Republic of Venice seeking money and ships for knights and infantry to Negroponte or Nauplia. The request, however, was refused, as the Briennist vassals in Greece had turned to the Catalans in the meanwhile. As late as the next year, however, Walter of Foucherolles was still commanding his vessels in the Argolid to remain loyal to Joanna and the young Walter. By constant petition to the King of Naples, the King of France, and the Pope, Joanna kept her claim to Athens alive for her son until he was old enough to campaign for his rights in the Aegean. In January 1321, Philip V of France mediated the suit brought against her by her own son, who was suing for the payment of some of his father's great debt.

Joanna herself retained her ducal title until her death. Her tomb, in the church (now destroyed) of the Dominican monastery in Troyes had the inscription Duchesse d'Athènes.
