= Peter of Enghien =

Count of Lecce

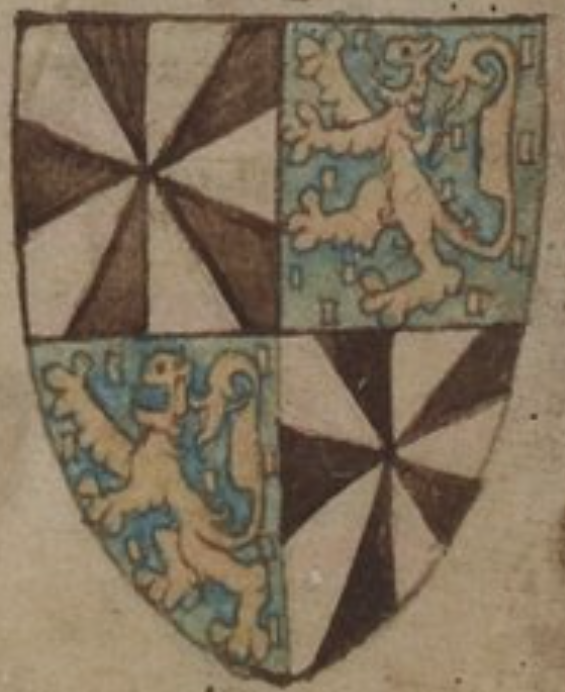
Coat of arms of the Enghien–Brienne of Lecce, from the Bellenville Armorial

Peter of Enghien (French: Pierre or Piere d'Enghien, Italian: Pietro or Pirro d'Enghien; died 1384) was the Count of Lecce and lord of Castro from 1373 to 1384.

He was the son of John of Enghien and Sancia de Baux. His family inherited feudal claims in the Latin Empire, but their inheritance in the Kingdom of Naples was not large enough to give them great influence there. He succeeded his father in 1373 as Count of Lecce. In the following year, he received a Papal license to take a pilgrimage to Jerusalem. He did not formally enter Lecce until 1376, accompanied by his uncles Louis, Lord of Enghien, and Francis, Duke of Andria.

In 1378, the Duke of Andria attacked Lecce with an army of Breton and English mercenaries after his offer to marry Peter's sister and heiress presumptive, Mary, had been rebuffed. By a ruse, Peter launched a successful counterattack that forced the duke to retreat and caught the mercenaries unprepared. Their leader was killed.

After 1380, Peter and his uncle Louis were drawn into the Neapolitan civil wars of the period. Both became partisans of Louis I of Anjou, adopted heir of Joanna I of Naples, against her second cousin Charles of Durazzo. Charles captured Joanna in 1381 and had her murdered in captivity in the following year, while Louis belatedly raised an army against him. At the time, Peter was in Venice seeking to return to his Neapolitan lands in Apulia. Charles attacked and confiscated his lands and those of his uncle Louis of Enghien, and declared them rebels on 11 February 1383.

Peter had married Margaret, daughter of Guy I, Count of Ligny in 1377. However, the marriage was childless when he died of plague in 1384. He was succeeded in Lecce by his sister, Mary. His widow later married Jean de Werchin.

== Sources ==
- Briggs, Martin Shaw (1910). In the Heel of Italy: A Study of an Unknown City. London: Andrew Melrose.
- Goffin, René (1965). Généalogies enghiennoises, Livre I: La Maison d'Enghien. Tablettes du Hainaut, III. Grandmetz: Claude-René Paternostre de la Mairieu.
- Luttrell, Anthony (1966). "The Latins of Argos and Nauplia: 1311–1394". Papers of the British School at Rome. 34. British School at Rome: 34–55. doi:10.1017/S0068246200007455. JSTOR 40310660. S2CID 179112752.

Preceded by John of Enghien	Count of Lecce; 1373–1384	Succeeded by Mary of Enghien
