= Jean de Werchin =

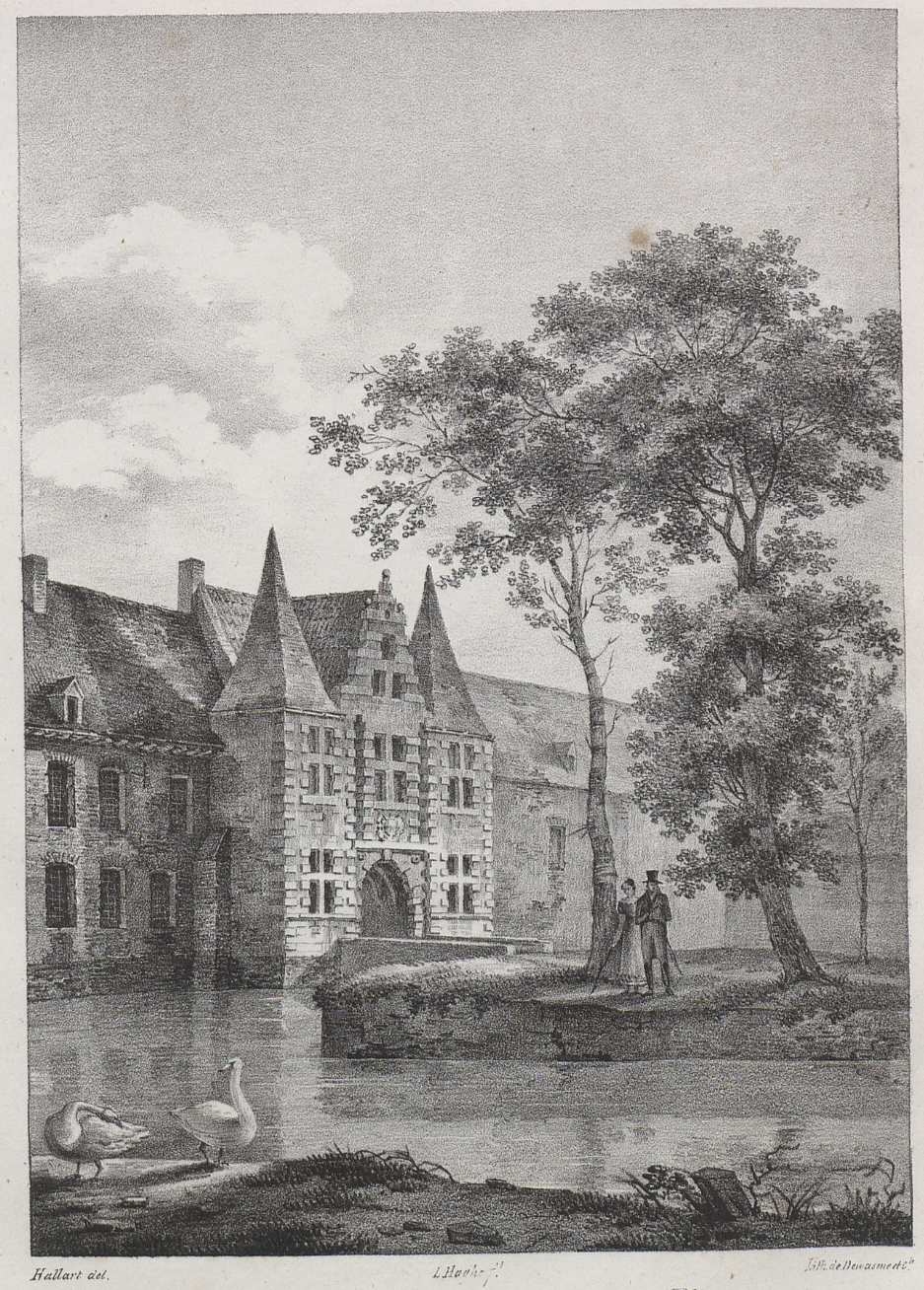
The castle of Biez at Wiers was Jean's principal residence.

Jean III (Note: He is sometimes given as Jean II or Jean IV, but Grenier-Winther uses Jean III.) de Werchin (1374 – 25 October 1415), called the Good (le Bon), was a knight errant and poet from the County of Hainaut in the Holy Roman Empire. In 1383 his father died and he inherited the baronies of Werchin, Walincourt and Cysoing, as well as the hereditary office of seneschal of Hainaut, which had been in his family since about 1234.

== Knight ==
=== Minority and the war with Frisia ===
Shortly after her first husband's death, Jean's mother, Jeanne d'Enghien, married Jacques de Harcourt, lord of Montgomery, who in 1385 was granted the mundeburdis (legal guardianship) for Jean, his two sisters and their patrimony. A Jean de Werchin who served Enguerrand VII of Coucy as a squire in Picardy in 1380 is a different person. The lord of Werchin only attained his majority in 1390, when he sued in the parlement of Paris to have Jacques de Harcourt removed as his protector. He was represented in Paris by Jean de Popaincourt. In 1393 he had a denominatio, a precise description of fiefs, drawn up for his Flemish holdings.

Jean made his first public appearance in arms in 1396, when he joined William's invasion of Frisia. He distinguished himself alongside the lords of Ligne and Jeumont. Afterwards, William knighted him. In 1398 he was fighting in Frisia again alongside the lord of Ligne, leading a company of thirteen knights and sixty lances.

=== Travels to the Holy Land, England, Prussia and Spain ===
Jean did not participate in the Crusade of Nicopolis in 1396, because his lord, William, Count of Ostrevant, was forbidden to go by his father, Count Albert of Hainaut and Holland. He made his first pilgrimage to the Holy Land in 1399 without permission and had to seek absolution. In 1402 he was at the siege of Gorinchem in the service of Count Albert. In June 1402 he proclaimed his intention to take the Way of Saint James and challenged any knight or squire to joust with him before Duke Louis of Orléans as judge. Then, in 1404, he announced a standing challenge to all comers to last for seven years. Between July and November 1404, he was at Brest with an army preparing to cross over to Wales to aid the Welsh rebels against England. He eventually did fight at Falmouth.

In 1405 Jean left on his second trip to the Holy Land accompanied by five men, including his chaplain, Nicolle, and his squire, Guillebert de Lannoy, who kept a journal. He stopped at the courts of Provence, Savoy, Genoa, Sicily, Rhodes, Constantinople and Cyprus, and did not return to Paris until June 1406. His group left behind some inscriptions in the old refectory of Saint Catherine's Monastery in the Sinai. He then made a trip to Prussia, for by 1407 he had brought back a young Lithuanian and was paying for his education in Tournai. This boy may have been an illegitimate child conceived during his travels.

On 20 May 1407 Jean fought in a four-a-side mêlée in Valencia. This event originated out of his challenge to Colomat de Santa Coloma to fight under the judgement of either King Martin of Aragon or his son, King Martin of Sicily. Colomat was not even knighted until the day of the mêlée. With him were Pere de Montcada, Peyronat de Santa Coloma and Bernabò de l'Uovo. With Jean de Werchin were Jacques de Montenay of Normandy, Tanneguy du Châtel of Brittany and Jean Carmen. (Note: His name is variously spelled Carmin, Kerneau or Carneau.) When the French appeared to have the upper hand, the king of Sicily called an end to the tournament, but so impressed was he with Jean that he asked for his armour, or at least his bassinet, as a gift.

=== War with Liège and the English pas d'armes ===
Jean was preparing to return to Prussia in May 1408, when he bade farewell to his friends at the Golden Head (Tête d'Or) inn in Tournai, but he was forced to turn back shortly after to assist William of Ostrevant—now count of Hainaut—against the prince-bishop of Liège. He was present when the Liègeois were defeated at the battle of Othée on 23 September 1408, leading the largest company from Hainaut: the lords of Jeumont and La Hamaide, plus nine knights, sixty-nine men-at-arms with three horses each, eleven more with two horses, and seventy-eight archers, as well as some men lent him by Duke John of Burgundy.

On 7 August 1407, Jean challenged the English knight John Cornewall to a pas d'armes, four knights a side, to be judged by the kings of England and France. On 25 June 1408, having left the war in Liège at least briefly, he was at Ardres, probably to meet Cornewall. In November, Jean wrote a letter to King Henry IV of England, asking permission to joust with a Knight of the Garter or else any "knight of renown" from England before either the king or Prince Henry of Wales acting as judge. The king, believing Jean intended to fight all the Knights of the Garter at once, urged him to challenge them one at a time. In June 1409, Jean and Cornewall twice came almost to blows: once before the duke of Burgundy at Lille and then again before the king of France at Paris, but both times the king prevented an actual joust from taking place. In July the two knights fought in a tournament at Smithfield in England. Eight knights from Hainaut fought eight from England in a series of one-on-one jousts over eight days. Jean, leading the men of Hainau, was unseated in his contest by the English leader, John Beaufort, earl of Somerset.

=== French service ===
Between 1411 and 1415 Jean was generally in the service of the king of France. According to the accounts of the king's war treasurer, Jean de Pressy, he was a banneret leading a "chamber" of ten squires within a company of the duke of Burgundy's men at Bourges in 1412. Between 1412 and 1414 he went on a pilgrimage to Santiago de Compostela, passing through Barcelona—from where he wrote a letter—on the way. Then, on 30 March 1414, his receiver for Cysoing remitted 200 écus à la couronne to pay for a knight, three noblemen, two priests, ten valets, a herald of arms, two men to accompany his chest, two pages and a pavilion for Jean's upcoming voyage, the destination of which has not come down. He was back by 9 November, when he looked over the accounts of Cysoing at his castle in Biez.

In 1398 Jean married Marguerite, daughter of Count Guy I of Ligny of the House of Luxembourg and widow since 1384 of Count Peter of Lecce. The marriage contracts were drawn up on 22 February and 8 March 1398. Marguerite died in March 1406. In 1412 Jean signed an agreement with her first husband's relative, Engelbert d'Enghien, (Note: Peter and Engelbert were also related to Jean's mother.) concerning the inheritance of Lecce (called Liches in the French document). Although three acts of certification (vidimus) of Jean's will are known, the will itself does not survive. He died at the Battle of Agincourt, fighting on the French side. His heir was his sister Jeanne.

== Poet ==
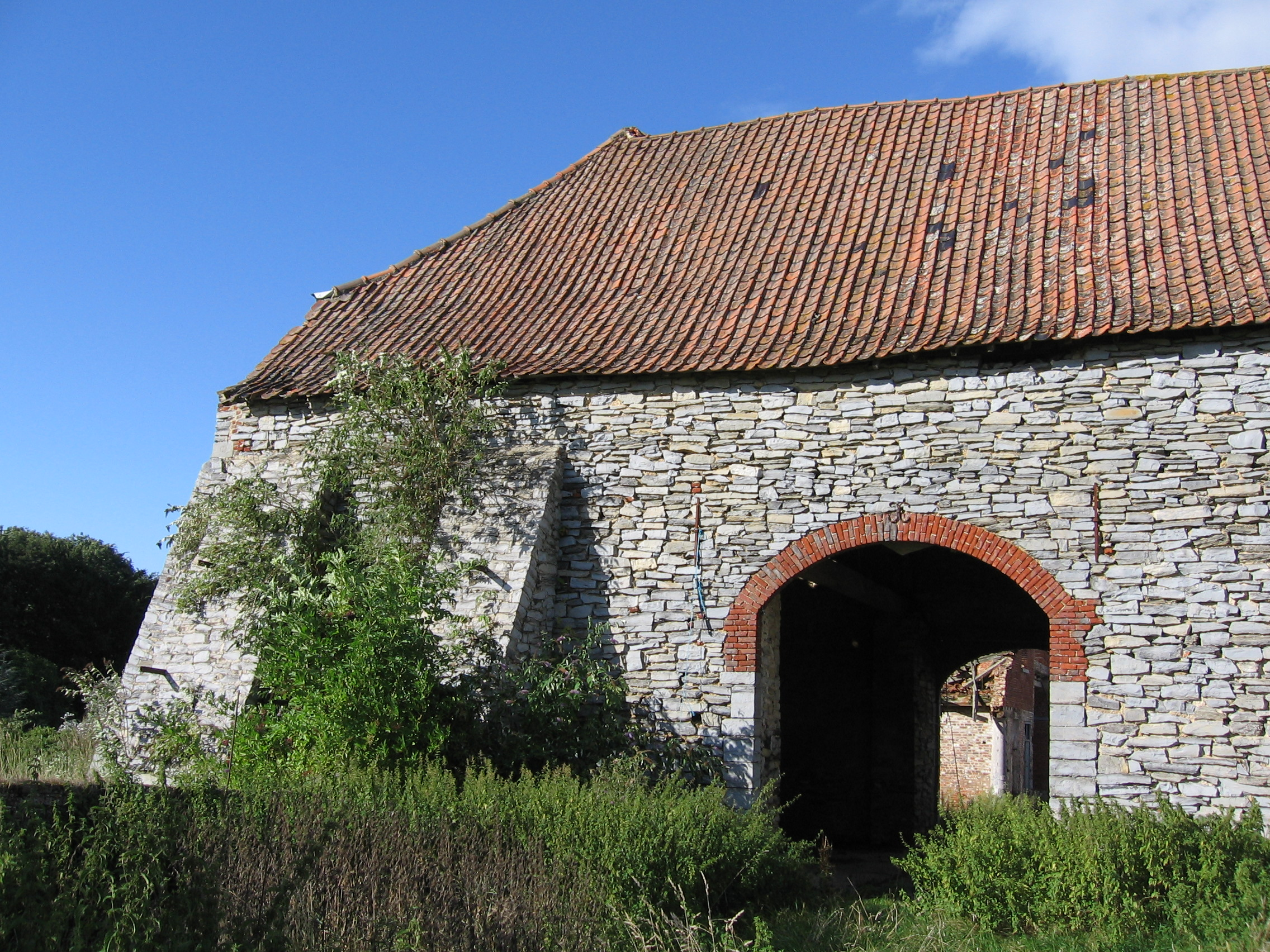
Barn of the Chartreuse du Mont-Saint-André de Chercq, founded by Jean's grandfather in 1375. Jean is buried in the cemetery.

Jean was famous in contemporary literary circles. He became a minister of the cour amoureuse ("court of love") founded in Paris in 1401. A Debat au Seneschal de Haynnau, probably from 1404, is lost. With Guillebert de Lannoy he also composed a series of ballades. According to the Livre des faits de Jacques de Lalaing, he was one of the most valiant warriors of Hainaut and la fleur de chevalerie (the flower of chivalry). Several of Jean's ballades and the Songe de la barge, 3500-line allegorical poem, date from his time at Brest, which he and several other members of the cour amoureuse (probably Jean de Garencières and Lourdin de Saligny) passed in writing poetry. To the Monk of Saint-Denis he was la fleur des braves (the flower of the brave).

Achille Caulier provides a fond remembrance of Jean in Hôpital d'amour (1430), putting him in the company Tristan and Lancelot. Contemporary and posthumous assessments of Jean's life and writing vary. Christine de Pizan praised him in a ballade for his chivalry and eloquence and dedicated her Livre des trois jugemens to him. Centuries later, Voltaire regard him in his Essai sur les Moeurs as a ridiculous Don Quixote and Arthur Piaget considered his poetry mediocre. As Charity Cannon Willard has observed, Jean was one of a generation of noblemen who took seriously the precepts of chivalry and courtly love, but "there were few aristocratic poets after 1415, when nearly a whole generation of knights perished."
