= Thomas Magister =

14th-century Byzantine scholar and grammarian

Thomas, surnamed Magister or Magistros (Greek: Θωμάς Μάγιστρος), also known by the monastic name Theodoulos Monachos, was a native of Thessalonica, a Byzantine scholar and grammarian and confidential adviser of Andronikos II Palaiologos (ruled 1282–1328).

His chief work, Ekloge onomaton kai rematon attikon (Ἐκλογὴ ὀνομάτων καὶ ῥημάτων ἀττικῶν), is a collection of selected Attic words and phrases, partly arranged in alphabetical order, compiled as a help to Greek composition from the works of Phrynichus, Ammonius, Herodian, and Moeris. He also wrote scholia on Aeschylus, Sophocles, Euripides (with a life), and three of the comedies of Aristophanes; the scholia on Pindar, attributed to him in two manuscripts, are now assigned to Demetrius Triclinius. His speeches and letters consist partly of declamations on the usual sophistical themes, partly dealing with contemporary historical events: an argument between the fathers of Cynaegirus and Callimachus (two Athenians who fell at the Battle of Marathon) as to which had the better claim to have the funeral oration pronounced over him first; Thomas is the writer of a mirror of prince addressed to Andronikos II Palaiologos; a defence of the Byzantine general Chandrenos addressed to the emperor; a letter on the cruelties of the Catalans and Turks in Thessaly and Macedonia; a congratulatory letter to Theodore Metochites; and a panegyric on the king of Cyprus.

== See also ==
- Palaeologan Renaissance
- Byzantine scholars in Renaissance
- List of Macedonians (Greek)
