= Sohier, Count of Enghien =

Count of Brienne from 1356 to 1364

Sohier of Enghien
- Duke of Athens

Count of Brienne
- Reign: 1356–1364
- Predecessor: Walter VI
- Successor: Walter VII

Lord of Enghien as Sohier II
- Reign: 1346–1364
- Predecessor: Walter III of Enghien
- Successor: Walter VII
- Died: 21 March 1364
- Issue: Walter VII
- House: Enghien
- Father: Walter III of Enghien
- Mother: Isabella of Brienne

Sohier of Enghien (died 21 March 1364), or Solier d'Enghien, was Lord of Enghien in the County of Hainaut from 1346, and Count of Brienne from 1356 until his death in 1364. He was also the titular Duke of Athens.

The second, but eldest surviving son of Walter III of Enghien and Isabella of Brienne, when his mother divided the inheritance of his uncle Walter VI of Brienne among her sons, he received the title of Duke of Athens.

Sohier was captured and beheaded by Albert I, Duke of Bavaria on 21 March 1364, leaving his titles to his son Walter VII.

Sohier, Count of Enghien House of Enghien Died: 21 March 1364
French nobility
Preceded by Walter V	— TITULAR — Duke of Athens; 1356–1364	Succeeded by Walter VII
Preceded by Walter V	Count of Brienne; 1356–1364	Succeeded by Walter VII
Preceded by Walter III of Enghien	Lord of Enghien; 1346–1364 as Sohier II	Succeeded by Walter VII
