= Walter VI of Brienne =

Duke of Athens and Governor of Florence (c. 1304–1356)

Walter of Brienne
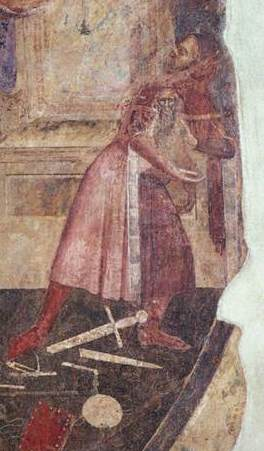
- Detail from The Expulsion of the Duke of Athens by Andrea Orcagna, c. 1343–49 (Palazzo Vecchio, Florence)

Podestà of Florence
- In office September 1342 – 26 July 1343
- Preceded by: Vacant (Jacopo de' Gabrielli da Gubbio in 1331)
- Succeeded by: Giovanni Bourbon del Monte Santa Maria

27th Constable of France
- In office 9 May 1356 – 19 September 1356
- Monarch: John II
- Preceded by: James I, Count of La Marche
- Succeeded by: Robert de Fiennes

Personal details
- Born: c. 1304 Lecce
- Died: 19 September 1356 (aged 51–52) Poitiers, France
- Spouse(s): Beatrice of Taranto; Joan of Brienne
- Children: Walter
- Parent(s): Walter V of Brienne (father); Joanna of Châtillon (mother)
- Family: House of Brienne

Walter VI of Brienne (Italian: Gualtieri, French: Gautier, c. 1304 – 19 September 1356), also known simply as the Duke of Athens, was a French nobleman and crusader. He was the count of Brienne in France, the count of Conversano and Lecce in southern Italy and claimant to the Duchy of Athens in Frankish Greece.

== Life ==
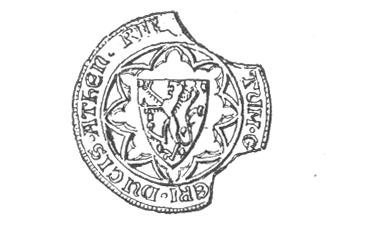
Seal of Walter, with his title of "Duke of Athens"

=== Early life in Italy ===
Walter was the son of Count Walter V of Brienne, duke of Athens, and Joanna of Châtillon (died 1354), the daughter of the count of Porcien, constable to King Philip IV of France. As grandson of Count Hugh of Brienne (d. 1296), he was heir to a vast property all around the Mediterranean. After his father's death at the Battle of Halmyros on 15 March 1311, Walter became count of Brienne, Lecce, and Conversano. However, the Duchy of Athens, except for Argos and Nauplia, had been overrun by the Catalan Company, and Walter spent much of his life in an unsuccessful struggle to recover that inheritance of his family. He spent most of his life in Italy and France and left Argos-Nauplia to be ruled by guardians.

During Walter's minority his mother Jeanne carried out a vigorous struggle against the Catalans, which impoverished him but had little military effect. To strengthen his position, Walter engaged in a strategic marriage to Beatrice, the niece of King Robert of Naples and daughter of Philip I of Taranto by Thamar Angelina Komnene, in December 1325. At this time, Florence requested King Robert's support in protecting Guelph interests in Italy, and elected Robert's son, Charles, Duke of Calabria, as signore of Florence for an expected ten-year period (1326–36). Walter VI's almost-princely position in the Angevin court soon won him an appointment as Vicar for Charles of Calabria in Florence, an office that he exercised for a few months in 1325.

=== Anti-Catalan crusade of 1331–1332 ===
After 1321, Walter repeatedly announced his intention to campaign in Greece and recover the Duchy of Athens, but financial constraints and his obligations to the King of Naples kept him occupied in Italy. In 1328, he even briefly concluded a truce with the Catalans. Thus it was not until 1330 that a serious effort got underway. In June 1330, Pope John XXII issued a crusading bull for Walter, and ordered prelates in Italy and Greece to preach for a crusade against the Catalans; shortly after, King Robert of Naples also gave the crusade his support and allowed his feudatories to join it. The Venetians, on the other hand, renewed their treaty with the Catalans in April 1331. Sailing from Brindisi in August, Walter attacked first the Latin County palatine of Cephalonia and Zakynthos, and the Greek Despotate of Epirus, forcing them to recognize the overlordship of King Robert. He also seized the island of Leucas and the mainland castle of Vonitsa for himself in the process. From there he proceeded to invade the Duchy of Athens through northern Boeotia, but his campaign was a failure as the Catalans avoided battle and withdrew behind the walls of Thebes and Athens. Walter had neither the troops to overwhelm the Catalans nor the money to sustain a prolonged war of sieges and attrition, and found no support among the native Greek population. By summer 1332, it was clear that the expedition had failed, and Walter returned to Brindisi, saddled with even more crippling debts. In his new Greek domains of Leucas and Vonitsa, Walter initially appointed a series of French castellans. In 1343, he made the Venetian Graziano Zorzi, who had helped finance his 1331 expedition and joined it himself, governor of Leucas. Zorzi proved successful in this role, and in October 1355, Walter granted Leucas as well as Vonitsa to him as a fief.

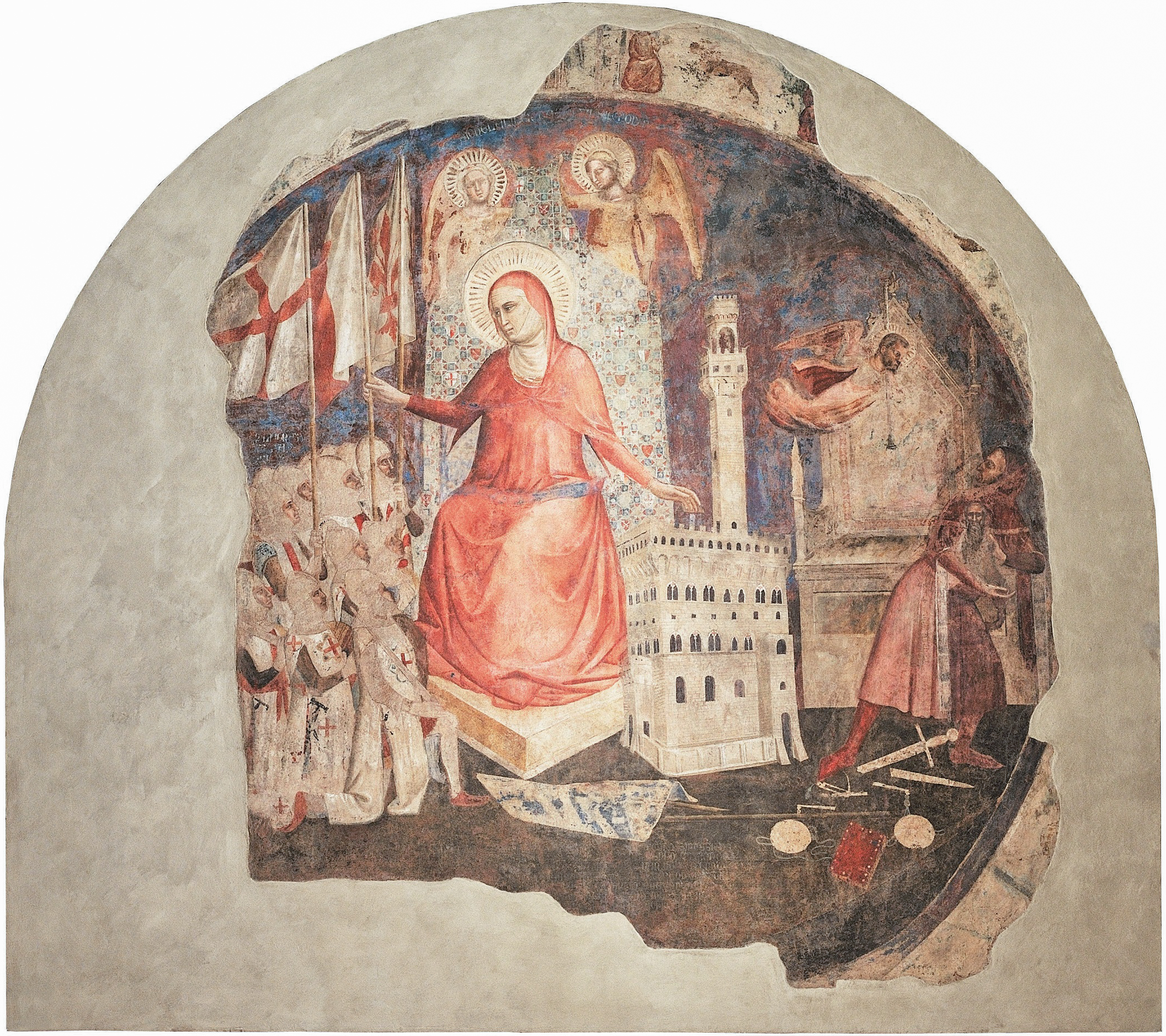
Orcagna, The Expulsion of the Duke of Athens (1343), in the Palazzo della Signoria

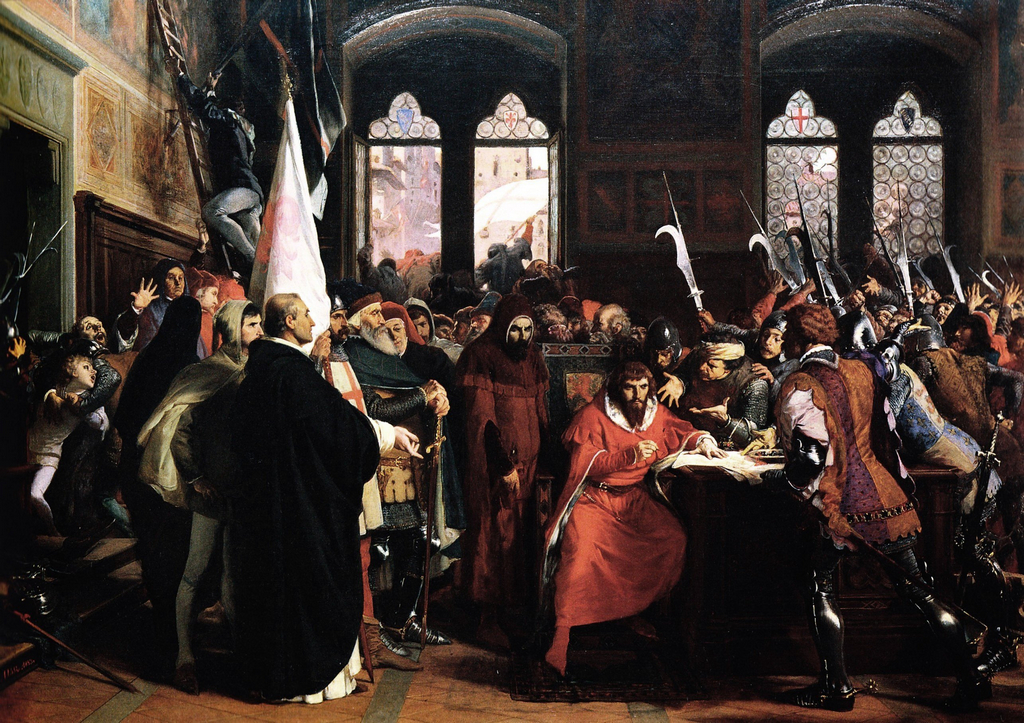
The Expulsion of the Duke of Athens from Florence, by Stefano Ussi (1860)

=== Ruler of Florence ===
Personal standards as ruler of Florence

He occupied himself with his lands in France, and was the King's Lieutenant in Thiérache in 1339. His wife died in 1340, and he returned to Italy in 1342 when the Florentine ruling class of wealthy merchants called upon him to rule the city. Since 1339, Florence had been in the grip of a severe economic crisis brought about by immense English debts to Florentine banking houses, and by astronomical public debts incurred in trying to obtain the nearby city of Lucca from its Veronese lord, Mastino della Scala. The Florentine nobility looked to foreign powers to solve the city's seemingly impossible financial problems, and found an ally in Walter of Brienne. Although the ruling class invited Walter to rule for a limited time, the lower classes, who were fed up with the ineptitude of Walter's predecessors, unexpectedly proclaimed him signore for life.

Walter VI ruled despotically, ignoring or directly opposing the interests of the very same merchant class that had brought him to power. The "Duke of Athens" imposed harsh economic correctives on the Florentines, including the flat tax estimo, and prestanze, postponements of the city's repayment of loans forced from the wealthier citizens. These measures both angered the Florentines and helped alleviate the fiscal crisis that had been stewing for years. After only ten months, Walter of Brienne's signoria was cut short by conspiracy. Walter VI was not only forced to resign from office but barely escaped Florence with his life.

=== Later life and death ===
In 1344, he married Jeanne, the daughter of Ralph III, Count of Eu. They had two daughters, Joan and Margaret, who died young. As he had no surviving children, it was evident that his sister's issue would inherit his possessions and claims. He was appointed constable of France in 1356 and in that capacity died on 19 September 1356 at the Battle of Poitiers. He was succeeded in his titles and pretensions by his sister Isabella and her sons. When the inheritance was divided after Walter VI's death, Sohier, Count of Enghien received the title of duke of Athens and county of Brienne. John d'Enghien gained the county of Lecce, Guy of Enghien received the Lordship of Argos and Nauplia, and Louis, Lord of Enghien became the count of Conversano.

== Cultural legacy ==
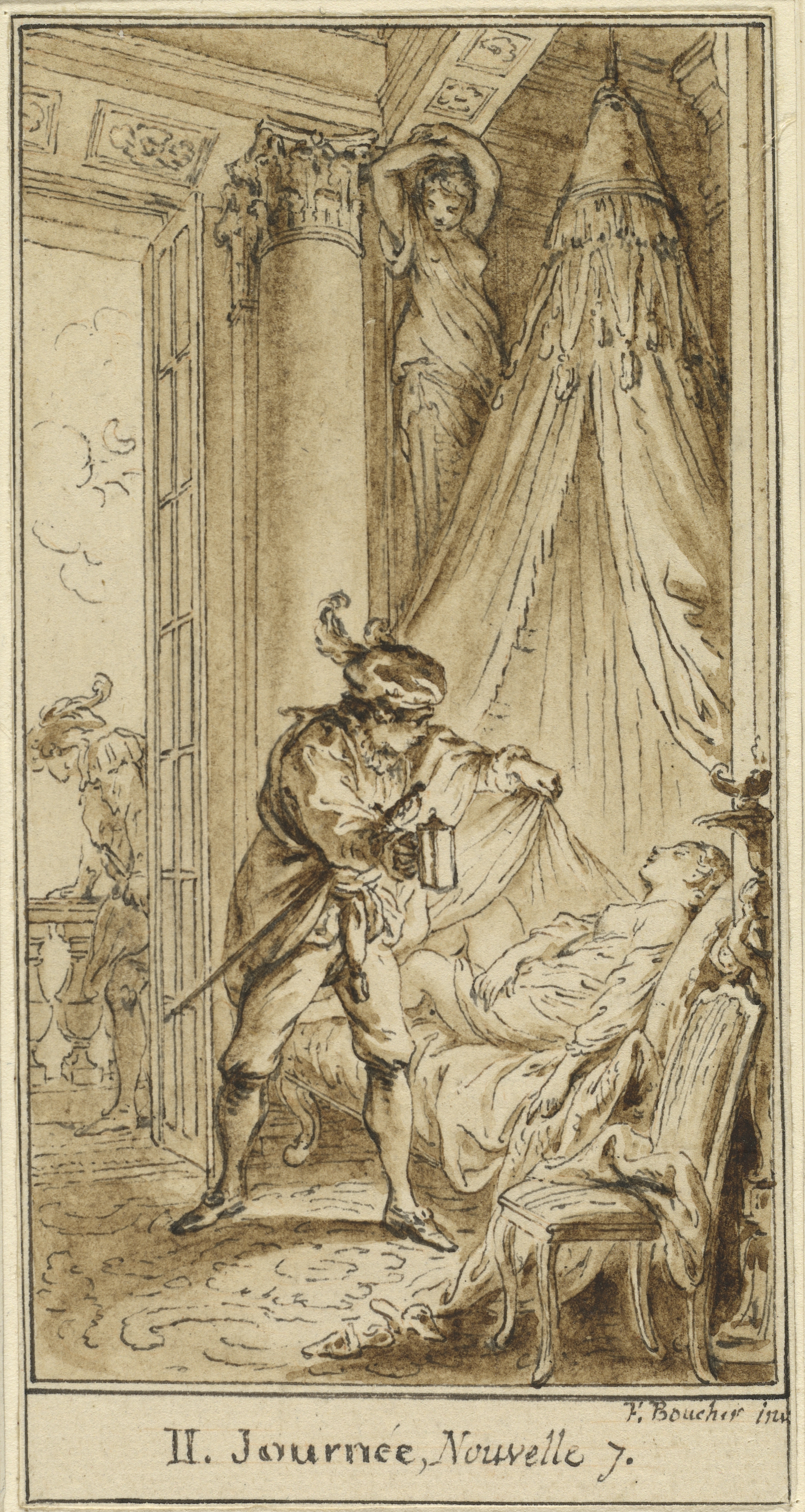
The Duke of Athens Contemplating the Sleeping Princess: 18th-century illustration from the Decameron.

The "Duke of Athens" who appears in the seventh tale of Day Two of the Decameron as one of the nine lovers of the Sultan of Babylon's daughter, while not historically accurate, is probably a satirical allusion to Walter VI – his brief but unforgettable tyranny in Florence occurred less than ten years before the writing of the Decameron.

== Sources ==
- Crum, Roger J. (2004). "Brienne, Walter of". In Kleinhenz, Christopher (ed.). Medieval Italy. Routledge. ISBN 9781135948801.
- The History of Florence from the Founding of the City through the Renaissance, New York: Harcourt Brace, 1936. pp. 217–225.
- Lock, Peter (2006). "Brienne family". In Murray, Alan V. (ed.). The Crusades: An Encyclopedia. ABC-CLIO. pp. 182–183.
- Luttrell, Anthony (1966). "The Latins of Argos and Nauplia: 1311-1394". Papers of the British School at Rome. 34. British School at Rome: 34–55. doi:10.1017/S0068246200007455. JSTOR 40310660. S2CID 179112752.
- Luttrell, Anthony (1982). Latin Greece, the Hospitallers and the Crusades (Collected Studies Ser, No. 158). Variorum.
- Nicol, Donald M. (1984). The Despotate of Epiros, 1267–1479: A Contribution to the History of Greece in the Middle Ages. Cambridge: Cambridge University Press. ISBN 978-0-521-13089-9.
- Nicolle, David (2004). Poitiers 1356:The Capture of a King. Osprey.
- Perry, Guy (2018). The Briennes: The Rise and Fall of a Champenois Dynasty in the Age of the Crusades, c. 950-1356. Cambridge University Press.
- Sestan, Ernesto (1972). "BRIENNE, Gualtieri di". Dizionario Biografico degli Italiani (in Italian). Vol. 14: Branchi–Buffetti. Rome: Istituto dell'Enciclopedia Italiana. ISBN 978-88-12-00032-6.
- Setton, Kenneth M. (1976). The Papacy and the Levant (1204–1571), Volume I: The Thirteenth and Fourteenth Centuries. Vol. 1. Philadelphia: The American Philosophical Society. ISBN 0-87169-114-0.

French nobility
Preceded by Walter V	— TITULAR — Duke of Athens; 1311–1356	Succeeded by Isabella; Sohier
Preceded by Walter V	Count of Brienne; 1311–1356	Succeeded by Isabella; Sohier
Preceded by Walter V	Lord of Argos and Nauplia; 1311–1356	Succeeded by Guy
Italian nobility
Preceded by Walter V	Count of Lecce; 1311–1356	Succeeded by John
Preceded by John II Orsini as Despot of Epirus	Lord of Lefkada and Vonitsa; 1331–1355	Succeeded by Graziano Zorzi
