= Ralph III of Eu =

Raoul I of Brienne
- Count of Eu; Count of Guînes
- The arms of the Count of Eu
- Died: 19 January 1344; Paris, Kingdom of France
- Noble family: Brienne
- Spouse: Jeanne de Mello
- Issue: Raoul II of Brienne, Count of Eu; Jeanne of Brienne; Marie of Brienne
- Father: John II of Brienne, Count of Eu
- Mother: Jeanne, Countess of Guînes

Raoul I of Brienne (died 19 January 1344, Paris) was the son of John II of Brienne, Count of Eu and Jeanne, Countess of Guînes.

He succeeded his father as Count of Eu in 1302, and his mother as Count of Guînes in 1332. In 1329, he was named Constable of France, and he also held the office of Governor of Languedoc. The Count of Eu commanded French forces during the opening stages of the Hundred Years' War, as befit his rank of Constable. However, he proved to be a poor commander and "a man of very limited talent", according to Lord Sumption.

In 1315, he married Jeanne de Mello (d. 1351), Lady of Lormes and Château-Chinon. The daughter of Dreux VI de Mello, she was the heiress to a rich Burgundian barony. They had three children:

1. Raoul II of Brienne, Count of Eu and Guînes (d. 1350)
2. Jeanne (d. 1389, Sens), Lady of Château-Chinon, married first in 1342/3 Walter VI of Brienne, married second in 1357 Louis I d'Évreux, Count of Étampes (1336–1400)
3. Marie, d. young

He was killed in a tournament being held in honour of the marriage of Philip, Duke of Orléans and Blanche of France, and was succeeded by his son Raoul. The costs of financing France's war against the English and maintaining a lifestyle to match his status had significantly drained his finances, and he had died bankrupt and in debt.

== Sources ==
- Dubois, Pierre (1956). The Recovery of the Holy Land. Translated by Brandt, Walther Immanuel. Columbia University Press.
- Perry, Guy (2018). The Briennes: The Rise and Fall of a Champenois Dynasty in the Age of the Crusades, c. 950-1356. Cambridge University Press.
- Sumption, Jonathan (1990). The Hundred Years War 1: Trial by Battle. London: Faber & Faber. ISBN 978-0-571-13895-1.
- Wagner, John A., ed. (2006). "Appendix 6:Constables and Marshals of France and England during the Hundred Years War". Encyclopedia of the Hundred Years War. Greenwood Press.

Preceded by John II	Count of Eu; 1302–1344	Succeeded by Raoul IV
Preceded by Jeanne	Count of Guînes; 1332–1344	Succeeded by Raoul IV
