= Demetrius Triclinius =

Byzantine scholar

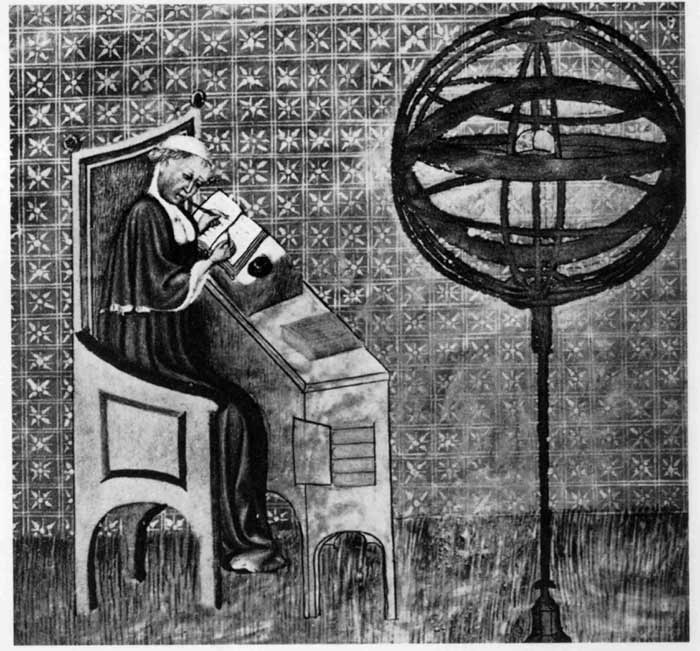
Demetrius Triclinius

Demetrius Triclinius (Greek: Δημήτριος Τρικλίνιος; b. c. 1300), a native of Thessalonica, was a Byzantine scholar who edited and analyzed the metrical structure of many texts from ancient Greece, particularly those of Aeschylus, Sophocles and Euripides. He is often compared favorably with two contemporary annotators of ancient Greek texts, Thomas Magister and Manuel Moschopulus, and his studies are responsible for the preservation of several important works, including the Agamemnon of Aeschylus . He also had knowledge of astronomy.

== See also ==
- Palaeologan Renaissance
- Byzantine scholars in Renaissance
- List of Macedonians (Greek)
