= Battle of Halmyros =

1311 battle in present-day Greece

- Map of the Greek and Latin states in southern Greece c. 1278
| Date | 15 March 1311 |
| Location | Halmyros, southern Thessaly (or by the Boeotic Cephissus, near Orchomenos) 39°10.8′N 22°45.6′E |
| Result | Catalan victory |
| Territorial changes | Conquest of the Duchy of Athens |

Belligerents
| Catalan Company | Duchy of Athens and allies |

Commanders and leaders
| Unknown | Walter V † |

Strength
| 2,000 cavalry 4,000 infantry (Chronicle of the Morea); 3,500 cavalry 4,000 infantry (Gregoras) | 700 knights 24,000 infantry (Muntaner); 6,400 cavalry 8,000 infantry (Gregoras); 2,000 cavalry 4,000 infantry (Chronicle of the Morea) |

Casualties and losses
| Unknown | Very heavy |
- Location within Greece

The Battle of Halmyros, known by earlier scholars as the Battle of the Cephissus or Battle of Orchomenos, was fought on 15 March 1311, between the forces of the Frankish Duchy of Athens and its vassals under Walter of Brienne against the mercenaries of the Catalan Company, resulting in a decisive victory for the mercenaries.

Engaged in conflict with their original employers, the Byzantine Empire, the Catalan Company had traversed the southern Balkans and arrived in southern Greece in 1309. The new Duke of Athens, Walter of Brienne, hired them to attack the Greek ruler of neighbouring Thessaly. Although the Catalans conquered much of the region for him, Walter refused to pay them and prepared to forcibly expel them from their gains. The two armies met at Halmyros in southern Thessaly (or at the Boeotic Cephissus, near Orchomenos, according to an earlier interpretation). On the Athenian side, many of the most important lords of Frankish Greece were present. The Catalans were considerably outnumbered and weakened by the reluctance of their Turkish auxiliaries to fight. They did have the advantage of selecting the battleground, positioning themselves behind marshy terrain, which they further inundated. Walter, a prideful man and confident in the prowess of his heavy cavalry, charged headlong against the Catalan line. The marsh impeded the Frankish attack and the Catalan infantry stood firm. The Turks re-joined the Company and the Frankish army was routed, with Walter and almost the entire knighthood of his realm falling in the field. Subsequently the Catalans took over the leaderless Duchy of Athens, ruling that part of Greece until the 1380s.

== Background ==
Following the Sack of Constantinople in 1204, much of Greece came under the rule of Frankish Crusader principalities. The most notable of them were the Kingdom of Thessalonica, the Principality of Achaea, and the Duchy of Athens, with its capital at Thebes. Thessalonica proved short-lived and fell to the resurgent Greeks, but the other Frankish principalities persevered and even prospered for most of the 13th century. In his landmark 1908 history of Frankish Greece, the medievalist William Miller writes of the Duchy of Athens that "under the dominion of the dukes of the house of de la Roche, trade prospered, manufactures flourished, and the splendours of the Theban court impressed foreigners accustomed to the pomps and pageants of much greater states." On 5 October 1308, the last de la Roche Duke of Athens, Guy II, died childless. His succession was disputed, but in mid-1309, the High Court (feudal council) of Achaea chose his cousin, the Burgundian noble Walter of Brienne, as successor.

At that time the Greek world was in turmoil owing to the actions of the Catalan Company, a group of mercenaries, veterans of the War of the Sicilian Vespers, originally hired by the Byzantine Empire against the Turks in Asia Minor. Mutual suspicion and quarrels led to war with the Byzantines; evicted from their base in Gallipoli in 1307, the Catalans fought and pillaged their way west through Thrace and Macedonia, until, pressed by Byzantine troops under Chandrenos, they entered Thessaly in early 1309. The last leader of the company, Bernat de Rocafort, had envisaged the restoration of the Kingdom of Thessalonica with himself at its head, and had even entered into negotiations for a marriage alliance with Guy II. Nothing came of these negotiations, as Rocafort's increasingly despotic rule led to his deposition. After that, the company was ruled by a committee of four, assisted by a twelve-member council. The arrival of the company's 8,000 men in Thessaly caused concern to its Greek ruler, John II Doukas. Having just exploited the death of Guy II to repudiate the overlordship of the Dukes of Athens, John turned to Byzantium and the other Greek principality, the Despotate of Epirus, for aid. Defeated by the Greeks, the Catalans agreed to pass peacefully through Thessaly towards the Frankish principalities of southern Greece.

Walter of Brienne had fought the Catalans in Italy during the War of the Vespers, spoke their language, and had gained their respect. Using this familiarity, he now hired the company for six months against the Greeks, at the high price of four ounces of gold for every heavy cavalryman, two for every light cavalryman, and one for every infantryman, to be paid every month, with two months' payment in advance. Turning back, the Catalans captured the town of Domokos and some thirty other fortresses, and plundered the rich plain of Thessaly, forcing the Greek states to come to terms with Walter. This brought Walter accolades and financial rewards from Pope Clement V, but the Duke now declined to honour his bargain with the Catalans and provide the remaining four months' pay. Walter picked the best 200 horsemen and 300 Almogavar infantry from the company, paid them their arrears and gave them land so they would remain in his service, while ordering the rest to hand over their conquests and depart. The Catalans offered to recognize him as their lord if they were allowed to keep some of the land they had taken to establish themselves but Walter rejected their proposal and prepared to expel them by force. The Duke of Athens assembled a large army, comprising his feudatories—among the most prominent were Albert Pallavicini, Margrave of Bodonitsa, Thomas III d'Autremencourt, Lord of Salona and Marshal of Achaea, and the barons of Euboea, Boniface of Verona, George I Ghisi, and John of Maisy—as well as reinforcements sent from the other principalities of Frankish Greece.

== Battle ==
=== Sources and location of the battle ===
A number of sources report in various degree of detail on the events before and during the battle: chapter 240 of the chronicle of Ramon Muntaner; the various versions of the Chronicle of the Morea (sections 540 and 548 of the French version, verses 7263–7300 and 8010 of the Greek version, and sections 546–555 of the Aragonese version), Book VII section 7 of the history of the Byzantine writer Nikephoros Gregoras, and brief accounts in Book VIII of the Nuova Cronica of the Florentine banker and diplomat Giovanni Villani, in the Istoria di Romania of the Venetian statesman Marino Sanudo and in letter of the latter that remained unpublished until 1940.

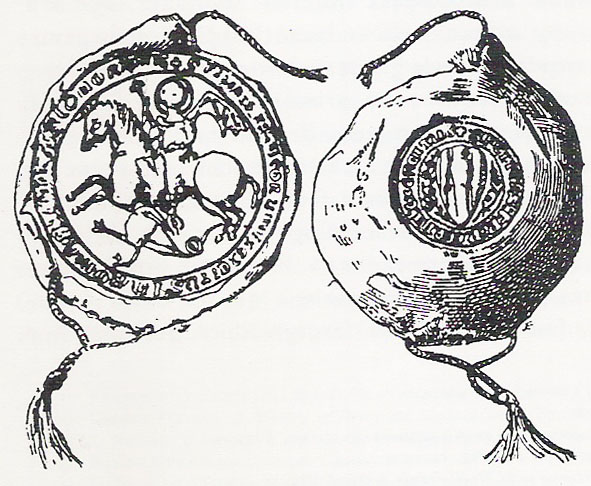
Seal of the Grand Catalan Company, c. 1305

The location of the battle varies in the different sources between two locations. Muntaner reports that it took place "at a beautiful plain near Thebes, where there were marshes", which has been identified with the plain of the Boeotic Cephissus and the marshes of Lake Copais (now drained). Gregoras likewise mentions that the battle took place near the Boeotic Cephissus. On the other hand, the versions of the Chronicle of the Morea place the battle at "Halmyros", apparently the town of the same name in southern Thessaly, where there was another city known as Thebes. The former localization had been long favoured in scholarship; in his standard history of Frankish Greece, William Miller rejected Halmyros on the basis of the topography described by Muntaner, a view that continues to be repeated in more recent works. Several proposals by modern scholars for the exact site of the battle in the Cephissus valley exist, ranging from the vicinity of Orchomenos and the vicinity of Copais to locations further north, around the villages of Chaeronea and Davleia, or even Amfikleia and Lilaia.

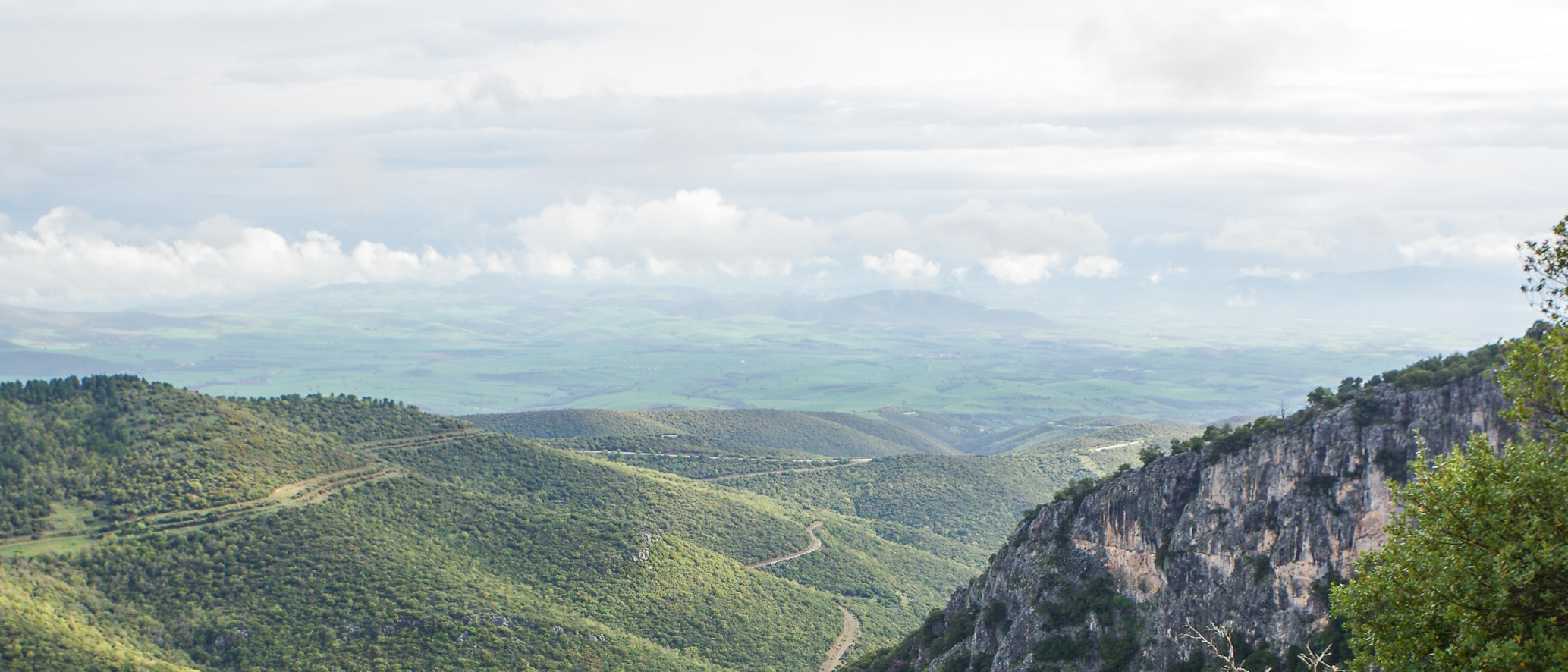
The plain of Halmyros, as seen from the Othrys mountains

The critical examination of the primary sources by more recent scholars has reversed the situation. Muntaner was himself a member of the company until 1307, but was posted as governor of Djerba when the battle occurred and only compiled his chronicle in 1325–1328, leading to some serious errors in his account. Gregoras, although a contemporary of the battle, wrote his history even later, in 1349–1351, relying mostly on second-hand sources; his understanding of the company's activities during the years before the battle is sketchy and inaccurate, and his account of the battle itself is very close to that of Muntaner, indicating perhaps that Gregoras drew on a Western source. On the other hand, the original French version of the Chronicle of the Morea, on which all other versions draw, was written between 1292 and 1320, and the abridged French version surviving today was compiled shortly after by a well-informed author in the Morea. The Greek and Aragonese versions, compiled later in the century, contain essentially the same information as the French version. A critical piece of evidence was the discovery and publication in 1940 of a 1327 letter by Marino Sanudo, who was a galley captain operating in the North Euboean Gulf on the day of the battle. Sanudo clearly states that the battle took place at Halmyros ("... fuit bellum ducis Athenarum et comitis Brennensis cum compangna predicta ad Almiro"), and his testimony is generally considered reliable. As a result, more recent historical studies commonly accept Halmyros as the site of the battle.

=== Course of the battle ===
According to the Chronicle of the Morea, the Catalan army comprised 2,000 cavalry and 4,000 infantry, while Gregoras claims 3,500 cavalry and 4,000 infantry for the Catalans. The Catalan cavalry were mostly of Turkish origin (Sanudo reports that they numbered 1,800), both as Turcopoles and horse archers; serving under their own leaders, the Turks were divided into two contingents, one of Anatolian Turks under Halil, which had joined the Company in 1305, and another under Malik, who had defected from Byzantine service shortly after the Battle of Apros. The members of the latter had been baptized as Christians. The sources differ considerably on the size of Walter's army: Gregoras reports 6,400 cavalry and 8,000 infantry, and the Chronicle of the Morea puts it at "more than" 2,000 cavalry and 4,000 infantry, while Muntaner asserts that it comprised 700 knights and 24,000 infantry, the latter mostly Greek. Modern scholars consider these numbers to be exaggerated, but they do suggest that the Athenian army had numerical superiority over the Catalans.

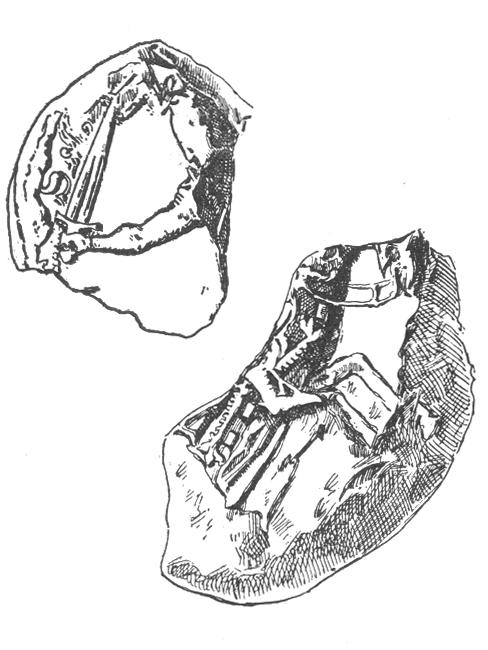
Fragments of Walter of Brienne's seal, appended to his last testament, written on 10 March 1311

Faced with a numerically superior but less experienced enemy, the Company assumed a defensive position, taking care to select a battleground that favoured them. The Catalans chose a naturally strong position, protected by a swamp which, according to Gregoras, they enhanced by digging trenches and inundating them with water diverted from the nearby river. The Catalans took up positions on dry ground behind the swamp, arranging themselves in a solid line but the sources give no further details as to their dispositions. The Athenian army assembled at Zetouni (modern Lamia). On 10 March 1311, Walter of Brienne composed his testament there and led his army forth. The presence of the Frankish army at Zetouni at this time is a further testimony in favour of locating the battle at Halmyros, as Zetouni lies north of the Cephissus but southwest of Halmyros. For Muntaner's and Gregoras' accounts to be correct, the Catalans would have to be behind the Duke's army; Gregoras furthermore writes that the Catalans passed through the Thermopylae to arrive in Boeotia, which is extremely unlikely given the presence of strong Frankish garrisons at Zetouni and Bodonitsa.

On the eve of battle, the 500 Catalans in the Duke's service, stricken by conscience, went to him and asked for leave to rejoin their old comrades-in-arms, saying they would rather die than fight against them. Walter reportedly gave them permission to leave, replying that they were welcome to die with the others. The Turkish auxiliaries took up a separate position nearby, thinking the quarrel was a pretext arranged by the Company and the Duke of Athens to exterminate them.

Walter was reputed for his bravery, bordering on recklessness, and was confident of success, as evidenced by his haughty reply to the 500 mercenaries. Walter's pride and arrogance, combined with his numerical advantage and his innate belief in the superiority of heavy noble cavalry over infantry, led him to fatally underestimate the Catalans and order a charge, even though the terrain was adverse to cavalry. Impatient for action, according to Muntaner, Walter formed a cavalry line of 200 Frankish knights "with golden spurs", followed by the infantry, and placed himself with his banner in the vanguard. The Frankish attack failed but the reason is unclear; Muntaner's description is short and provides no details, while in Gregoras, the heavy Frankish cavalry got stuck in the mud, with the Almogavars, lightly armed with swords and darts, dispatching the knights encumbered in their heavy armour. This is the commonly accepted version among scholars as well. The Chronicle of the Morea implies that the battle was hard-fought—which, as military historian Kelly DeVries notes, seems to contradict Gregoras—and that the marsh possibly merely reduced the impact of the charge, instead of bogging it down entirely. It is clear that the Catalans defeated the charge and that the Duke and most of his men fell. As the two lines clashed, the Turkish auxiliaries realised there was no treachery and descended from their camp upon the Athenian army, panicking and routing its remnants.

Gregoras reports that 6,400 cavalry and 8,000 infantry fell in the battle, the same number he gives for Walter's forces. According to Muntaner, 20,000 infantry were killed and only two of the seven hundred knights survived the battle, Roger Deslaur and Boniface of Verona. Like the number of troops involved in the battle, these losses are unverifiable and probably exaggerated, but they indicate the scale of the Athenian defeat. Both David Jacoby and Kenneth Setton have noted that the similarities between account of the battle in Muntaner and Gregoras and the descriptions of the earlier Battle of the Golden Spurs in 1302, where the Flemish infantry defeated the French knights, down to the number of 700 knights slain "all with spurs of gold", as claimed by Muntaner. Jacoby in particular considers the creation of an artificial marsh to halt the cavalry charge as a possibly invented element in both cases, for the purpose of explaining the surprising defeat of French knights through the use of a "treacherous" trap. Some senior members of the Frankish nobility are known to have survived: Nicholas Sanudo, later Duke of the Archipelago, managed to escape, and a few others such as Antoine le Flamenc, who is known to have participated in and survived the battle, were probably captured and later ransomed. Walter's head was severed by the Catalans and many years later was taken to Lecce, in Italy, where his son Walter VI buried him in the Church of Santa Croce.

== Aftermath ==
The battle was a decisive event in the history of Frankish Greece; almost the entire Frankish elite of Athens and its vassal states lay dead on the field or in captivity, and when the Catalans moved onto the lands of the Duchy, there was scant resistance. The Greek inhabitants of Livadeia immediately surrendered their strongly fortified town, for which they were rewarded with the rights of Frankish citizens. Thebes, the capital of the Duchy, was abandoned by many of its inhabitants, who fled to the Venetian stronghold of Negroponte, and was plundered by the Catalan troops. Finally, Athens was surrendered to the victors by Walter's widow, Joanna of Châtillon. All of Attica and Boeotia passed peacefully into the hands of the Catalans, and only the lordship of Argos and Nauplia in the Peloponnese remained in the hands of Brienne loyalists. The Catalans divided the territory of the Duchy among themselves. The decimation of the previous feudal aristocracy allowed the Catalans to take possession relatively easily, in many cases marrying the widows and mothers of the very men they had slain in Halmyros. The Catalans' Turkish allies, however, refused the offer to settle in the Duchy. The Turks of Halil took their share of the booty and headed for Asia Minor, only to be attacked and almost annihilated by a joint Byzantine and Genoese force as they tried to cross the Dardanelles a few months later. The Turks of Malik entered the service of the Serbian king Stefan Milutin, but were massacred after rebelling against him.

Lacking a leader of stature, the Catalan Company turned to their two distinguished captives; they asked Boniface of Verona, whom they knew and respected, to lead them, but after he declined, chose Roger Deslaur instead. Deslaur proved a disappointment, and the hostility of Venice and the other Frankish states compelled the Catalans to seek a powerful protector. They turned to the House of Barcelona King of Sicily, Frederick II, who appointed his son Manfred as Duke of Athens. In practice, the Duchy was governed by a succession of vicars-general appointed by the Crown of Aragon, often cadet members of the Catalan-Aragonese royal family. The most successful vicar-general, Alfonso Fadrique, expanded the Duchy into Thessaly, establishing the Duchy of Neopatras in 1319. The Catalans consolidated their rule and survived a Briennist attempt to recover the Duchy in 1331–1332. In the 1360s, the twin duchies were plagued by internal strife, were locked in a quasi-war with Venice, and increasingly felt the threat of the Ottoman Turks, but another Briennist attempt to launch a campaign against them in 1370–1371 came to naught. It was not until 1379–1380 that Catalan rule faced its first serious setback, when the Navarrese Company conquered Thebes and much of Boeotia. In 1386–1388, the ambitious lord of Corinth, Nerio I Acciaioli, captured Athens and claimed the Duchy from the Crown of Aragon. With his capture of Neopatras in 1390, the era of Catalan rule in Greece came to an end.

In military history, the battle was part of a major shift in European warfare, which began with the Battle of the Golden Spurs in 1302: it signalled an era where infantry successfully challenged the traditional predominance of knightly heavy cavalry.

== Sources ==
- Bon, Antoine (1969). La Morée franque. Recherches historiques, topographiques et archéologiques sur la principauté d'Achaïe [The Frankish Morea. Historical, Topographic and Archaeological Studies on the Principality of Achaea] (in French). Paris: De Boccard.
- DeVries, Kelly (1996). Infantry Warfare in the Early Fourteenth Century. Woodbridge: Boydell Press. ISBN 978-0-85115-567-8.
- Fine, John V. A. (1994) [1987]. The Late Medieval Balkans: A Critical Survey from the Late Twelfth Century to the Ottoman Conquest. Ann Arbor, Michigan: University of Michigan Press. ISBN 978-0-472-10079-8.
- Jacoby, David (1974). "Catalans, Turcs et Vénitiens en Romanie (1305–1332): un nouveau témoignage de Marino Sanudo Torsello". Studi medievali, III serie (in French). XV. Spoleto: 217–261. ISSN 0391-8467.
- Kalaitzakis, Theofanis (April 2, 2011). "Καταλανική Εταιρεία και μάχη του Αλμυρού (1311)". Encyclopedia of the Hellenic World, Boeotia (in Greek). Foundation of the Hellenic World.
- Lock, Peter (2006). The Routledge Companion to the Crusades. London and New York: Routledge. ISBN 978-1-135-13137-1.
- Lock, Peter (2013) [1995]. The Franks in the Aegean, 1204–1500. New York and London: Routledge. ISBN 978-0-582-05139-3.
- Loenertz, Raymond-Joseph (1975). Les Ghisi, dynastes vénitiens dans l'Archipel (1207–1390) (in French). Florence: Olschki.
- Longnon, Jean (1969) [1962]. "The Frankish States in Greece, 1204–1311". In Setton, Kenneth M.; Wolff, Robert Lee; Hazard, Harry W. (eds.). A History of the Crusades, Volume II: The Later Crusades, 1189–1311. Vol. 2 (Second ed.). Madison, Milwaukee, and London: University of Wisconsin Press. pp. 234–275. ISBN 0-299-04844-6.
- Miller, William (1908). The Latins in the Levant: A History of Frankish Greece (1204–1566). London: John Murray.
- Nicol, Donald M. (1993) [1972]. The Last Centuries of Byzantium, 1261–1453 (Second ed.). Cambridge: Cambridge University Press. ISBN 978-0-521-43991-6.
- Setton, Kenneth M. (1975). "The Catalans in Greece, 1311–1388". In Setton, Kenneth M.; Hazard, Harry W. (eds.). A History of the Crusades, Volume III: The Fourteenth and Fifteenth Centuries. Vol. 3. Madison and London: University of Wisconsin Press. pp. 167–224. ISBN 0-299-06670-3.
- Setton, Kenneth M. (1976). The Papacy and the Levant (1204–1571), Volume I: The Thirteenth and Fourteenth Centuries. Vol. 1. Philadelphia: The American Philosophical Society. ISBN 0-87169-114-0.
- Topping, Peter (1975). "The Morea, 1311–1364". In Setton, Kenneth M.; Hazard, Harry W. (eds.). A History of the Crusades, Volume III: The Fourteenth and Fifteenth Centuries. Vol. 3. Madison and London: University of Wisconsin Press. pp. 104–140. ISBN 0-299-06670-3.

== Primary accounts ==
- Lady Goodenough, ed. (1920–21). The Chronicle of Ramon Muntaner (PDF). London: Hakluyt Society.
- Migne, Jacques Paul, ed. (1865). Nicephori Gregorae, Byzantinae Historiae Libri XXXVII. Patrologia Graeca, vol. 148. Paris: Garnier.
- Morel-Fatio, Alfred, ed. (1885). Libro de los fechos et conquistas del principado de la Morea compilado por comandamiento de Don Fray Johan Ferrandez de Heredia, maestro del Hospital de S. Johan de Jerusalem – Chronique de Morée aux XIIIe et XIVe siècles, publiée & traduite pour la première fois pour la Société de l'Orient Latin par Alfred Morel-Fatio. Geneva: Jules-Guillaume Fick.
