= Walter V of Brienne =

Duke of Athens (c. 1275 – 1311)

Walter V

Duke of Athens
- Reign: 1308 – 1311
- Predecessor: Guy II
- Successor: Manfred
- Born: c. 1275
- Died: 15 March 1311 (aged 35–36); Battle of Halmyros, Duchy of Athens
- Spouse: Joanna of Châtillon
- Issue: Walter VI; Isabella
- House: Brienne
- Father: Hugh of Brienne
- Mother: Isabella de la Roche
- Religion: Roman Catholic

Walter V of Brienne (French: Gautier; c. 1275 – 15 March 1311) was Duke of Athens from 1308 until his death. The only son of Hugh of Brienne and Isabella de la Roche, he was the heir to large estates in France, the Kingdom of Naples, and the Peloponnese. Between 1287 and 1296/97, he was held in custody in the Sicilian castle of Augusta as security for his father's ransom to the Aragonese admiral Roger of Lauria. Following his father's death in battle against Lauria in 1296, Walter succeeded to the County of Brienne in France, and the counties of Lecce and Conversano in southern Italy. Though released soon afterwards, he was captured during a Neapolitan campaign in Sicily in 1299, remaining in captivity until the Treaty of Caltabellotta in 1302.

Walter settled in France and married Joanna of Châtillon. After his cousin, Duke Guy II of Athens, died childless in 1308, Walter asserted his claim to the duchy. Their cousin, Eschiva of Ibelin, also asserted her right, but the High Court of Achaea ruled in Walter's favour, and he arrived in Athens in 1309. John II Doukas, the Greek ruler of Thessaly, formed an alliance against him with the Byzantine Empire and the Despotate of Epirus. To counter this, Walter engaged the Catalan Company, a band of mercenaries, to invade Thessaly. The Catalans routed John, yet Walter denied them their wages; they rose in rebellion, and Walter gathered a substantial force from Frankish Greece. At the Battle of Halmyros, however, the Catalans crushed his army. Walter fell in the fighting, and the Catalans seized control of the Duchy of Athens.

== Early life ==
Frankish Greece around the time of Walter's birth

Born c. 1275, Walter was the only son of Hugh of Brienne and Isabella de la Roche. Hugh held significant fiefs in both France (the county of Brienne), and in southern Italy (the counties of Lecce and Conversano). Isabella, the younger daughter of Duke Guy I of Athens, brought estates in the Peloponnese to the marriage. She died in 1279.

The historian Guy Perry describes Walter as a "veritable child" of the War of the Sicilian Vespers (1282–1302). His father, a commander in the service of King Charles II of Naples, played a prominent role in the conflict. After he was taken prisoner at the Battle of the Counts on 23 June 1287, his release was secured only by surrendering his son as a hostage to the Aragonese admiral Roger of Lauria as a guarantee for his ransom. Walter remained confined in the Sicilian fortress of Augusta for years, during which he likely learnt Catalan and became familiar with Aragonese customs.

Walter was still in captivity when his father fell in battle against Lauria at Brindisi in the summer of 1296. On 27 August, King Charles II ordered Hugh's southern Italian vassals to swear fealty to Walter. After his release, Walter travelled to France and took possession of his father's French estates. He was invested with the county of Brienne before May 1297.

== Warlike aristocrat ==
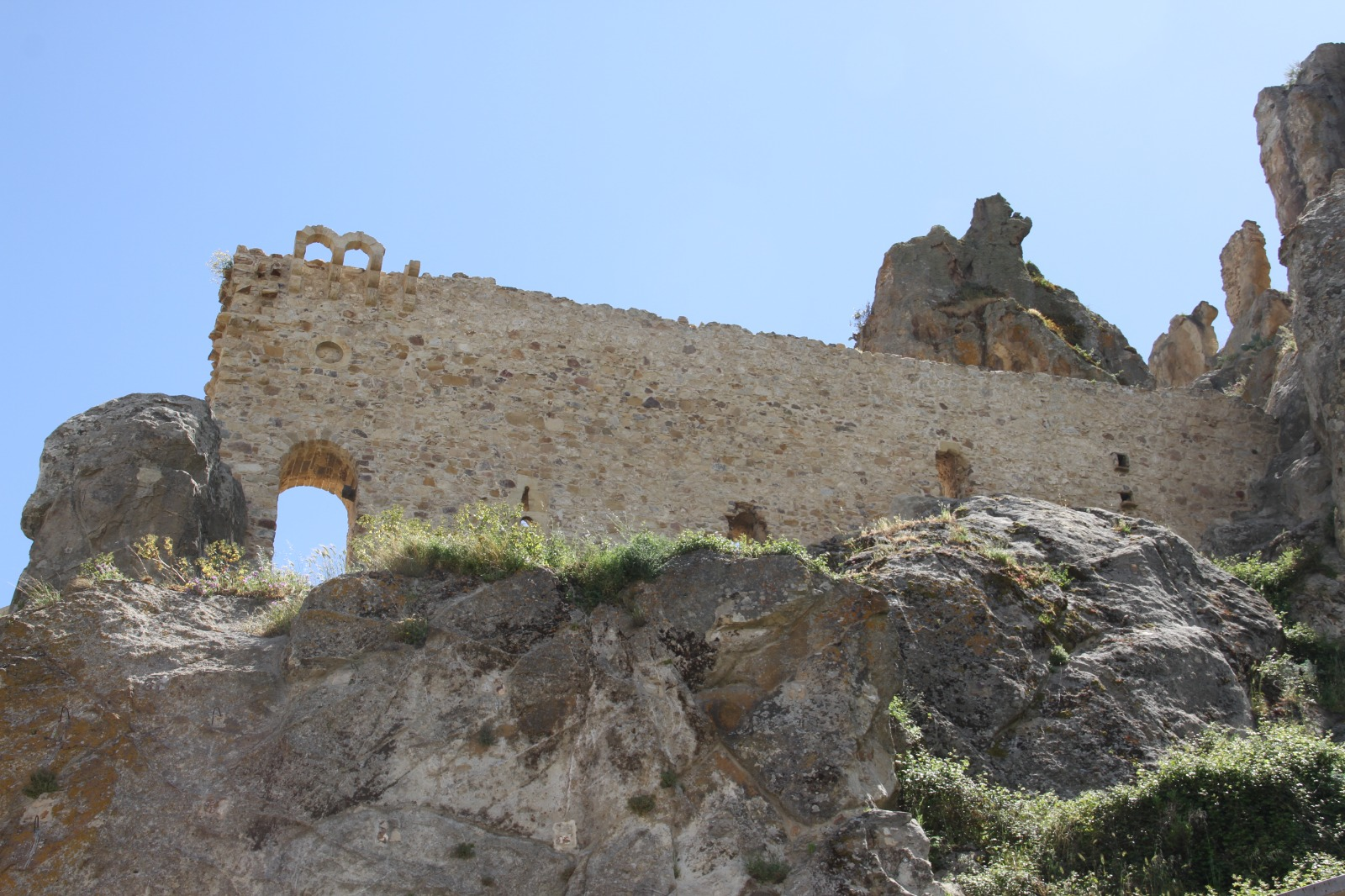
Ruins of the walls of Gagliano Castelferrato in Sicily

Seeking to avenge his father's death, Walter allied himself with two French noblemen whose fathers had likewise been killed in Italy. Together they hired 300 horsemen, known as the "Knights of Death", and joined the army raised by Robert, Duke of Calabria and heir to Charles II, for an invasion of Sicily. Robert and his troops landed at Catania and seized the town.

Soon afterwards, rumours spread through the Neapolitan camp that the castellan of Gagliano Castelferrato was prepared to surrender without resistance. Robert sent Walter and his retainers to the fortress to open negotiations. The report, however, was a deliberate stratagem to lure the Neapolitan forces into a trap. When Walter realised the situation, he refused to withdraw, and in the ensuing Battle of Gagliano he was compelled to surrender.

During his captivity, Charles II entrusted the administration of Walter's southern Italian domains to Philip of Toucy. Following the Treaty of Caltabellotta in 1302, which brought the War of the Sicilian Vespers to an end, Walter was released, and by June 1303 he had returned to France. His subsequent marriage to Joanna of Châtillon, daughter of the constable of France, further strengthened his position there.

== Duke of Athens ==
On 5 October 1308, Duke Guy II of Athens died without heirs. His two cousins, Walter and Eschiva of Ibelin, each advanced a claim to the duchy. Eschiva was the daughter of Alice de la Roche, elder sister of Walter's mother, but the High Court of the Principality of Achaea—the feudal overlord of Athens—ruled in Walter's favour, declaring that, when relatives of equal degree competed for an inheritance, the male claimant took precedence over the female. Before departing for Athens, Walter entrusted the administration of Brienne to his father-in-law, Gaucher V de Châtillon.

Walter landed at Glarentza in Achaea in the summer of 1309. By the time he reached Athens, John II Doukas, ruler of Thessaly, previously Guy II's vassal, had thrown off Athenian suzerainty. The Byzantine emperor Andronikos II Palaiologos and Anna Palaiologina Kantakouzene, de facto ruler of Epirus, supported John, leaving Walter to seek outside aid. The Catalan Company—a body of unemployed mercenaries—had been raiding Thessaly since 1305. Walter hired them and their Turkish allies to fight the Greek lords. The mercenaries invaded Thessaly, seizing key fortresses, and after six months John II was compelled to sue for peace.

Walter, however, still owed the mercenaries four months' pay, which he was unwilling to discharge. Instead, he chose 200 horsemen and 300 almogàvars (lightly armed infantry) from their ranks, promised to pay only them, and offered fiefs in return for service. The rest he ordered to leave the duchy. The dismissed mercenaries refused, asking instead to settle in the newly conquered lands as his vassals. Distrusting them, Walter threatened capital punishment for disobedience. With no other options, the disbanded troops rose in open revolt. The 500 Catalan mercenaries whom Walter had retained soon joined their compatriots, forcing him to call for support from Achaea and other parts of Frankish Greece.

== Death ==
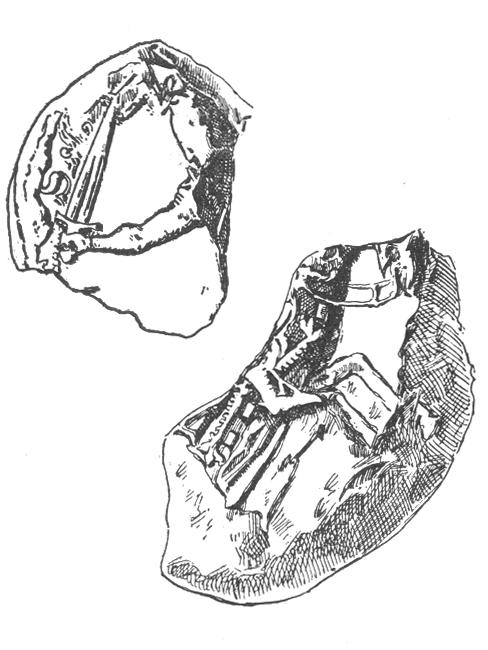
Walter's seal, appended to his last testament

Walter's army confronted the Catalans on the marshy plain of Halmyros on 15 March 1311. The Catalans were prepared to make peace, but Walter was resolved to expel them. In the ensuing battle, they won a crushing victory, killing Walter and almost all of his cavalry; a Turkish soldier decapitated Walter's body and carried his head in triumph from the battlefield. They then occupied the Duchy of Athens, which they held for more than seventy years under nominal Aragonese suzerainty. In 1348, his son retrieved the severed head and buried it at the city of Lecce, most probably in the church of Sant'Oronzo.

== Family ==
Walter's kinship with the dukes of Athens, counts of Brienne and Lecce, and kings of Cyprus

Walter III of Brienne	Elvira of Lecce	Hugh I of Cyprus	Alice of Champagne
Guy I of Athens	Walter IV of Brienne	Maria of Cyprus	Henry I of Jerusalem	Isabella of Cyprus
John I of Athens	William I of Athens	Alice de la Roche	Isabella de la Roche	Hugh of Brienne	Hugh II of Cyprus	Hugh III of Cyprus
Guy II of Athens	Eschiva of Ibelin, Lady of Beirut	Walter V of Brienne

Walter had two children with his wife, Joanna:

- Walter VI of Brienne (1302–1356), his successor as count of Lecce and Conversano, made repeated but fruitless attempts to recover his father's duchy from the Catalans;
- Isabella of Brienne (died 1360), married Walter III of Enghien, and claimed her brother's title to Lecce and Conversano on his death.

== Sources ==
- Edbury, Peter W. (1994). Kingdom of Cyprus and the Crusades. Cambridge University Press. ISBN 978-0-521-45837-5.
- Lock, Peter (1995). The Franks in the Aegean, 1204–150. Longman. ISBN 978-0-582-05140-9.
- Perry, Guy (2018). The Briennes: The Rise and Fall of a Champenois Dynasty in the Age of the Crusades, c. 950–1356. Cambridge University Press. ISBN 978-1-107-19690-2.
- Setton, Kenneth M. (1975). "The Catalans in Greece, 1311–1380". In Setton, Kenneth M.; Hazard, Harry W. (eds.). A History of the Crusades, Volume III: The Fourteenth and Fifteenth Centuries. Vol. 3. Madison and London: University of Wisconsin Press. pp. 167–224. ISBN 0-299-06670-3.
- Setton, Kenneth M. (1976). The Papacy and the Levant (1204–1571), Volume I: The Thirteenth and Fourteenth Centuries. Vol. 1. Philadelphia: The American Philosophical Society. ISBN 0-87169-114-0.

Walter V of Brienne House of Brienne Born: c. 1278 Died: 15 March 1311
Preceded by Hugh	Count of Brienne, Lecce, and Conversano; 1296–1311	Succeeded by Walter VI
Preceded by Guy II	Duke of Athens; 1308–1311	Succeeded by Manfred
