= Martin S. Briggs =

British architectural historian and author

Martin Shaw Briggs FRIBA
- Born: 1882
- Died: 1977 (aged 94–95)
- Occupation: Architectural historian

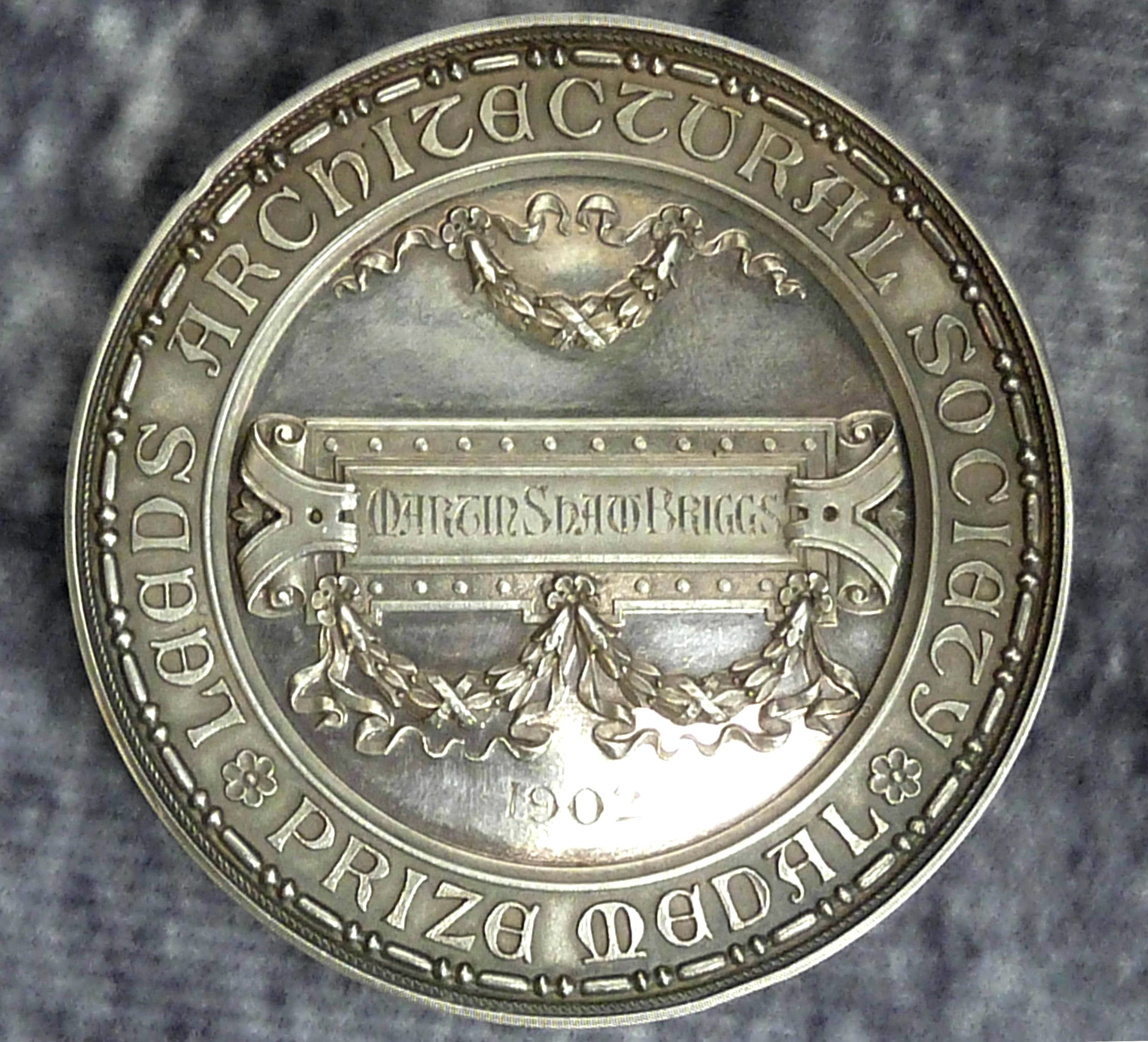
Silver medal awarded to Martin Shaw Briggs by WYSA 1902

Martin Shaw Briggs (1882–1977) was a British architectural historian and author who specialised in the Baroque period before it became the subject of serious academic enquiry, and became vice-president of the Royal Institute of British Architects.

Early Work

In 1904, Briggs was awarded a prize by the Leeds and Yorkshire Architectural Society (now West Yorkshire Society of Architects or WYSA), a subset of the Royal Institute of British Architects. The prize was for drawings "showing the construction of an entrance hall and staircase."

Drawing of Piazza Sant'Oronzo, Lecce from In the Heel of Italy: A study of an unknown city

== Selected publications ==
- In the Heel of Italy: A Study of an Unknown City, A. Melrose, London, 1910.
- Baroque Architecture, T.F. Unwin, London, 1913.
- Architecture. (Home University Library of Modern Knowledge)
- A Short History of the Building Crafts, The Clarendon Press, Oxford, 1925.
- The Architect in History, Clarendon Press, Oxford, 1927.
- The Homes of the Pilgrim Fathers in England and America (1620–1685), Oxford University Press, 1932.
- Middlesex Old and New , Allen & Unwin, London, 1934.
- Puritan Architecture and its Future, Lutterworth Press, London, 1946.
- Wren, the Incomparable, Allen & Unwin, London, 1953.
- Everyman's Concise Encyclopaedia of Architecture, J.M. Dent, London, 1960.
- Architecture in Italy: A Handbook for Travellers and Students, J.M. Dent, London, 1961.
- A Pictorial Guide to Cathedral Architecture, Pride of Britain series, Pitkin Pictorials, Ltd., London, 1973.
- Muhammadan Architecture in Egypt and Palestine, Da Capo Press, New York, 1974. ISBN 0306705907
