= Walter IV of Enghien =

Walter IV of Enghien (died 1381), Hainault nobleman and soldier, was the son of Sohier of Enghien. He was Count of Brienne as Walter VII and Lord of Enghien in 1364–1381.

Appointed Marshal of Flanders by Louis II of Flanders, he energetically prosecuted the war against the rebellious Ghentois. He is notorious for his sack of the city of Geraardsbergen on July 7, 1381, wherein his troops burned and destroyed the town, killing many of its inhabitants.

Rejoining the Flemish army besieging Ghent, he and a handful of companions were trapped by an ambush laid by the Ghentois, perhaps composed of survivors of Geraardsbergen. He and his illegitimate half-brother John were both cut down in the fighting.

He was succeeded by his heir in proximity of blood, his uncle Louis of Enghien.

French nobility
Preceded by Sohier	— TITULAR — Duke of Athens; 1364–1381	Succeeded by Louis
Preceded by Sohier	Count of Brienne; 1364–1381	Succeeded by Louis
