= County of Lecce =

Former county in Italy

Contea di Lecce
- Former subdivision of County of Apulia and Calabria (1055–1130); Kingdom of Sicily (1130–1282); Kingdom of Naples (1282–1463)
- 1055–1463
- Coat of arms
- Capital: Lecce
- Government
- Count
  - 1055: Raynald
  - 1446–1463: Giovanni Antonio
- History
  - Norman conquest of Apulia: 1055
  - The county is directly annexed to the royal estates of the Kingdom of Naples.: 1463

The County of Lecce (Italian: Contea di Lecce) was a county located in Apulia, in south-eastern Italy, which existed from 1055 until 1463. Its capital was at the city of Lecce, and it was bounded by the territories of Brindisi to the north, Oria and Nardò to the west, and Soleto and Otranto to the south.

== History ==
The county was founded by the Normans after their conquest of Apulia in the 1050s. Several Norman monarchs held their court at Lecce, and Tancred of Hauteville, who was Count of Lecce from 1149 to 1194, was born here. His daughter Elvira Maria Albina married Walter III of Brienne, whose family held the duchy of Lecce in the following centuries. In 1384 Mary of Enghien, a granddaughter of Isabella of Brienne, became Countess of Lecce. When she married Raimondo Orsini del Balzo, Count of Soleto and (from 1393 to 1406) Prince of Taranto, all of the Salento was united into one of the largest fiefdoms in the Kingdom of Naples and of the Italian peninsula. Raimondo improved the administration of the county and the city.

After his death, the county went to his son, Giovanni Antonio Orsini Del Balzo, who had also inherited the Principality of Taranto in 1420. At his death in 1463, Ferdinand I of Naples named himself as the heir to Giovanni Antonio's rich legacy, annexing the county to the royal estates of the Kingdom of Naples.
